= John Penkestone =

English politician

John Penkestone (died by 1422), of Southampton, was an English politician.

== Family ==
Little is known of Penkestone's family. He married a woman named Joan, at some point before 1392. Nothing more is recorded of Joan, or of Penkestone's family. It is unknown whether they had children or who inherited his estates when he died, at some point by 1422 when a claim was made no one of his properties, and it is recorded that he was deceased.

== Career ==
He is thought to have been a merchant and owned several properties in Southampton.

He was a Member (MP) of the Parliament of England for Southampton in 1386, 1394 and 1406.

Parliament of England
Preceded by Sir William Russell ?	Member of Parliament for Southampton; 1386; With: Roger Mascall	Succeeded by William Maple; John Scarlet
Parliament of England
Preceded by William Maple; Thomas Appleby	Member of Parliament for Southampton; 1394; With: Thomas Appleby	Succeeded by Thomas Appleby; Thomas Marlborough
Parliament of England
Preceded by ? ?	Member of Parliament for Southampton; 1406; With: Walter Lange	Succeeded by ? ?
