= 1917 Southampton by-election =

UK parliamentary by-election

The 1917 Southampton by-election was a by-election held on 19 December 1917 for the UK House of Commons constituency of Southampton, a two-member seat.

== Vacancy ==
The election was caused by the appointment of one of the sitting Liberal MPs, William Dudley Ward as Vice-Chamberlain of the Household, one of the government whips. Under the Parliamentary rules of the day, Ward was obliged to resign his seat and fight a by-election. The writ for the by-election was moved in Parliament on 10 December 1917.

== Candidates ==
The Liberals re-selected Ward. Being their partners in the coalition government of David Lloyd George, the Unionists were not expected to oppose Ward’s re-election but there was a possibility he would be challenged by a member of Southampton Town Council, Mr Tommy Lewis, the President of the British Seafarers' Union. However, in the event no other candidates came forward to oppose Ward and he was returned unopposed.

== The result ==
Southampton by-election, December 1917: Southampton
Party	Candidate	Votes	%	±%
National Liberal	William Dudley Ward	Unopposed	N/A	N/A
National Liberal hold				

== See also ==
- List of United Kingdom by-elections (1900–1918)
