= John Scarlett (disambiguation) =

John Scarlett, (born 1948) was Director General of the British Secret Intelligence Service.

John Scarlett or Scarlet may also refer to:

- John Scarlet (footballer), Indonesian footballer
- John Scarlet (MP) (fl.1388), MP for Southampton
- John Scarlett (footballer), (born 1947) former Australian rules footballer
- John Scarlett (Toronto), (1777–1865) Canadian merchant-miller, and pioneer
