= Arthur Atherley =

British politician (1772-1844)

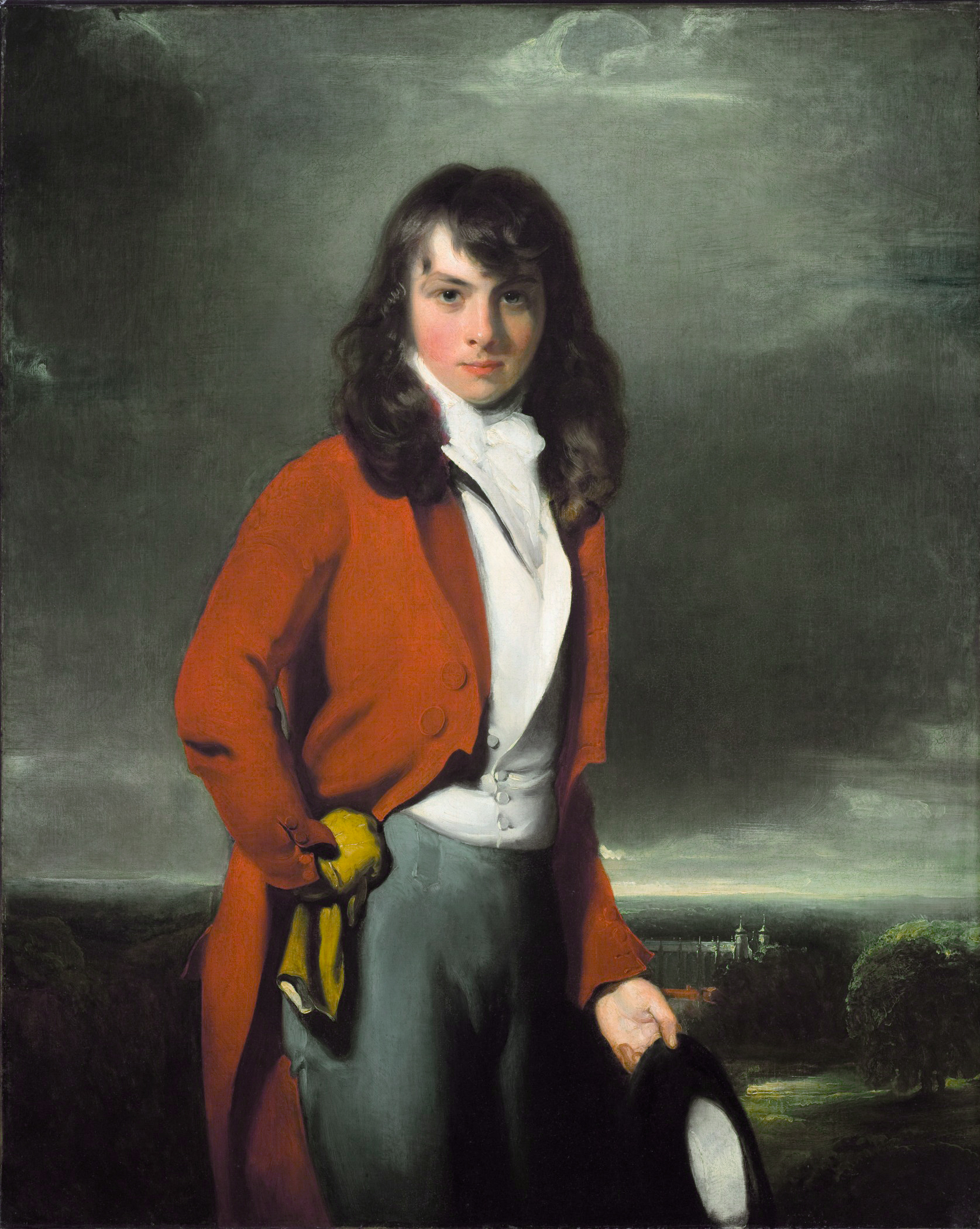
Portrait of Arthur Atherley by Sir Thomas Lawrence, 1792

Arthur Atherley (12 June 1772 – 1 October 1844) was a British politician who represented Southampton in the House of Commons of the United Kingdom between 1806 and 1835. Atherley was born in Southampton, the son of Arthur Atherley and Susanna Carter, and was the fifth successive member of the Atherley family to be baptised as "Arthur". He was educated at Eton College where, in 1791, he had his portrait painted by Sir Thomas Lawrence (it now hangs in the Los Angeles County Museum of Art). At Eton, he was captain of the Ad Montem club, an institution with roots in medieval times that survived until 1847. One of the club's traditions was to take part in a procession to Salt Hill during which boys in fancy costume, the salt bearers, participated in the maintenance of their "captain" at university by levying contributions from passers-by.

After finishing his education at Eton, he went up to Trinity College, Cambridge, where he was admitted a pensioner on 6 May 1790, matriculating at Michaelmas, 1791, following which he was admitted to Lincoln's Inn. On 2 June 1793, he married Lady Louisa Kerr, daughter of William Kerr, 5th Marquess of Lothian; they had eight children. Atherley was four times elected to represent Southampton as M.P.; in 1806, 1812, 1831 and 1832, and was one of the original members of the Fox Club. He was also a member of the family banking business in Southampton. He retired from politics in 1835. He later moved to Sussex, where he served as a justice of the peace. He died at Tower House, Brighton in 1844, but was buried in All Saints' Church, Southampton.

Parliament of the United Kingdom
Preceded by James Amyatt; George Henry Rose	Member of Parliament for Southampton; 1806–1807; With: George Henry Rose	Succeeded by Josias Jackson; George Henry Rose
Preceded by Josias Jackson; George Henry Rose	Member of Parliament for Southampton; 1812–1818; With: George Henry Rose	Succeeded by William Chamberlayne; Sir William Champion de Crespigny, Bt
Preceded by Abel Rous Dottin; James Barlow-Hoy	Member of Parliament for Southampton; 1831–1835; With: John Storey Penleaze 1831–1832; James Barlow-Hoy 1832–1833; John Storey Penleaze 1833–1835	Succeeded by Abel Rous Dottin
