= Charles Cecil Martyn =

British Conservative politician

Member of Parliament for Southampton
- In office 2 July 1841 – 6 May 1842 Serving with Humphrey St John-Mildmay
- Preceded by: Adam Haldane-Duncan; Abel Rous Dottin
- Succeeded by: Alexander Cockburn; Brodie McGhie Willcox

Personal details
- Born: 1809
- Died: 3 September 1866 (aged 56–57)
- Party: Conservative

Charles Cecil Martyn (1809 – 3 September 1866) was a British Conservative politician.

Martyn was elected Conservative Member of Parliament for Southampton at the 1841 general election, but lost the seat the next year when his election was declared void due to bribery by his agents.

His father was white, whilst his mother was a “woman of colour” from India.

Parliament of the United Kingdom
Preceded by Adam Haldane-Duncan; Abel Rous Dottin	Member of Parliament for Southampton; 1841–1842; With: Humphrey St John-Mildmay	Succeeded by Alexander Cockburn; Brodie McGhie Willcox
