= George William Hope =

British Tory politician

Under-Secretary of State for War and the Colonies
- In office 8 September 1841 – 8 January 1846
- Monarch: Victoria
- Prime Minister: Sir Robert Peel, Bt
- Preceded by: Robert Vernon Smith
- Succeeded by: The Lord Lyttelton

Personal details
- Born: 4 July 1808 Abercorn, Linlithgowshire, Scotland
- Died: 18 October 1863 (aged 55) Luffness, North Berwickshire, Scotland
- Party: Tory
- Spouse: Hon. Caroline Georgiana Montagu-Scott (d. 1891)

George William Hope (4 July 1808 – 18 October 1863), was a British Tory politician. He served as Under-Secretary of State for War and the Colonies under Sir Robert Peel from 1841 to 1846.

== Background and education ==
Hope was the son of the Honourable Sir Alexander Hope, fourth son of John Hope, 2nd Earl of Hopetoun. His mother was Georgiana Alicia Brown, daughter of George Brown. He was educated at Harrow.

== Political career ==
Hope was returned to Parliament for Weymouth and Melcombe Regis in 1837. When the Tories came to power under Sir Robert Peel in 1841, Hope was appointed Under-Secretary of State for War and the Colonies, a post he held until the fall of the government in 1846. In 1842 he was returned for Southampton, a seat he lost in 1847. He remained out of parliament until 1859, when he was returned for Windsor, a seat he represented until his death four years later.

== Family ==
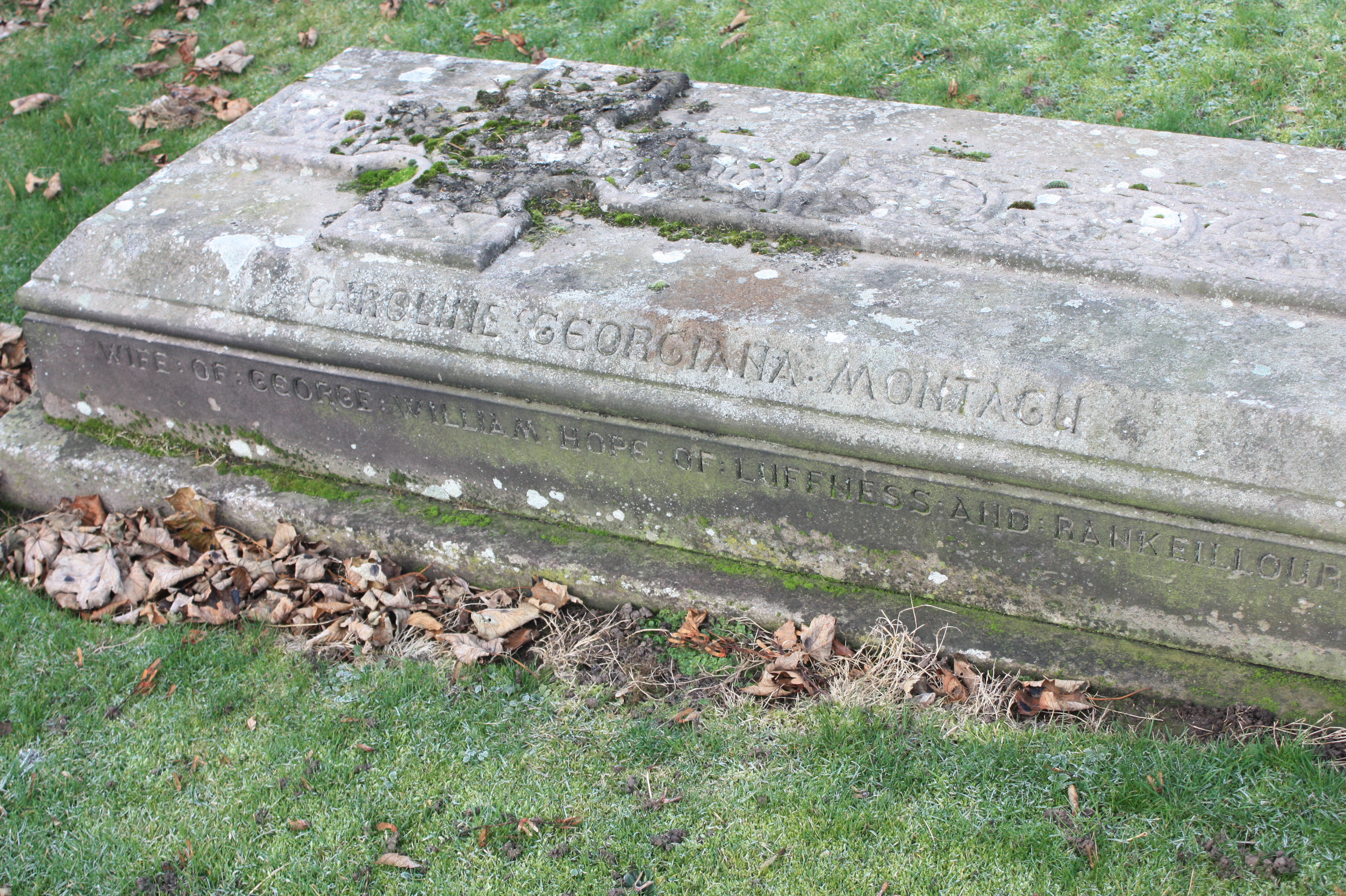
The grave of Caroline Georgina Montagu Hope, Aberlady churchyard

Hope married the Honourable Caroline Georgiana Montagu-Scott, daughter of Henry Montagu-Scott, 2nd Baron Montagu of Boughton, in 1836. They had several children, including Sir Edward Stanley Hope, a Lunacy Commissioner, and Sir Herbert James Hope (1851–1930), Bankruptcy Registrar. Hope died at Luffness in October 1863, aged 55. Caroline Hope died in December 1891. She is buried in Aberlady churchyard in East Lothian.

Parliament of the United Kingdom
Preceded by Fowell Buxton; William Wharton Burdon	Member of Parliament for Weymouth and Melcombe Regis; 1837–1842; With: Viscount Villiers	Succeeded by Ralph Bernal; William Dougal Christie
Preceded by Lord Bruce; Charles Cecil Martyn	Member of Parliament for Southampton; 1842–1847; With: Humphrey St John-Mildmay	Succeeded by Sir Alexander Cockburn, Bt; Brodie McGhie Willcox
Preceded by Charles Grenfell; William Vansittart	Member of Parliament for Windsor; 1859–1863; With: William Vansittart	Succeeded by William Vansittart; Richard Henry Howard Vyse
Political offices
Preceded by Robert Vernon Smith	Under-Secretary of State for War and the Colonies; 1841–1846	Succeeded by The Lord Lyttelton
