= Thomas Appleby =

Thomas Appleby may refer to:

- Thomas Appleby (MP) (died 1413), MP for Southampton
- Thomas Appleby (composer) (c. 1488–1563), English Renaissance composer and church musician
- Thomas Appleby (bishop) (died 1395), Bishop of Carlisle
