= Midanbury =

Coordinates: 50.926°N 1.3646°W

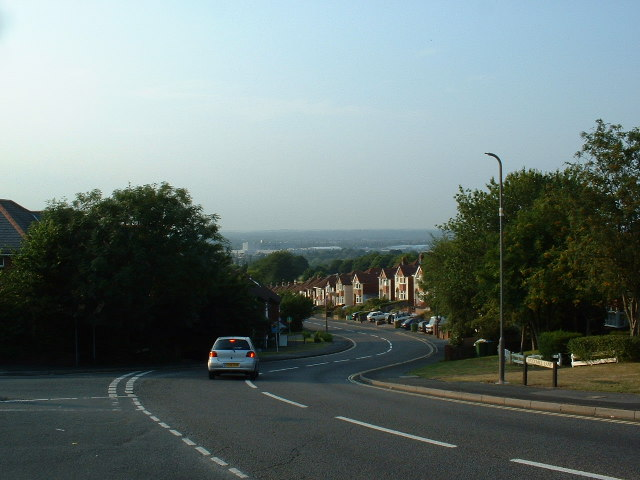
- The view over the Itchen Valley from Midanbury

- Location within Southampton
- Unitary authority: Southampton
- Ceremonial county: Hampshire
- Region: South East
- Country: England
- Sovereign state: United Kingdom
- Post town: SOUTHAMPTON
- Postcode district: SO18
- Dialling code: 023
- Police: Hampshire and Isle of Wight
- Fire: Hampshire and Isle of Wight
- Ambulance: South Central
- UK Parliament: Southampton Itchen

Midanbury is a small suburb of Southampton, England, bordering Bitterne, Bitterne Park and Townhill Park.

== History ==
In 1790 Southampton was a spa town whose popularity led to the construction of several country houses in the surrounding area, one of which was at Midanbury, situated on the summit of a hill to the east of the town. Known by a variety of names (Midanbury House, Midanbury Heights and Midanbury Lodge among them), the house was built by Mr T Leversuch. A writer in 1878 praised the beauty of the countryside, and the "exceedingly fine" views from the Midanbury Heights.

The opening of the toll-free Cobden Bridge in 1883 enabled the townsfolk to travel across the river where Midanbury House, with its castellated lodge and crenellated gateway, particularly captured the imagination. As a result, the estate's grounds became a popular venue for Sunday School outings from the town's churches, featuring picnic tables and a variety of games, including Cricket matches played by the adults.

The house's lodge was built circa 1800 as a direct copy of that at Blaise Castle near Bristol which was designed by John Nash. It had battlements and turrets, arrow slits, window panes in the gothic style, and was topped with a crest. The building came to be known as Midanbury Castle, and served as accommodation for servants of the main house. Among the last to live there were the coachman-gardener Herbert Grosvenor and his wife, the housekeeper, Alice.

Michael Hoy, a merchant of Bishopsgate, London and later Walthamstow (then in Essex) who specialised in trading with Russia, purchased several properties in Hampshire and the Isle of Wight, including Midanbury House. He served the office of Sheriff of London in 1812, having been elected to the Worshipful Company of Ironmongers on 22 April 1808. Hoy married Elizabeth, the second daughter of Andrew Hawes Bradley of Gore Court near Sittingbourne, Kent, on 24 May 1825 in South Stoneham Church (although the register lists his name as Michael Hay). Hoy died just three years later, on 26 June 1828, and left his estate to a distant cousin, the Dublin-born James Barlow, a military surgeon. Barlow took on the name Hoy as a mark of respect, becoming James Barlow Hoy by royal licence on 26 January 1829.

James Barlow Hoy announced his candidacy to be a Member of Parliament for the Southampton constituency in 1829 and gave his first speech from Midanbury. Hoy was subsequently elected to Parliament on 13 January 1830, and re-elected in a general election later that year. He trailed in the polls for the 1831 election and pulled out, but was elected again in 1832 and once more in 1835. He subsequently moved to Thornhill Park, also in Southampton, but as of 1833 was still at Midanbury and also serving as Sheriff of Southampton. Hoy died in 1843 of tetanus resulting from a shooting accident in the Pyrenees.

In the mid-19th century the estate was held by Charles John Middleton as a Copyhold tenure. Middleton also owned a share of a freehold property in Jamaica and subsequently purchased two houses in Kolkata (then known as Calcutta) in India. He mortgaged Midanbury in January 1843 and died in the same month of the next year with debts larger than the value of his estate.

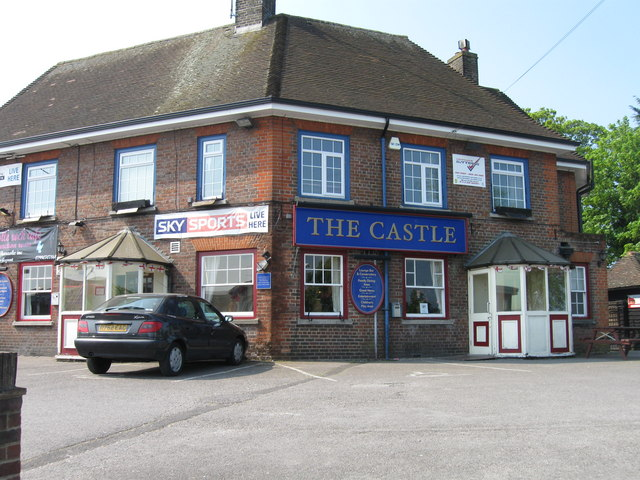
The Castle pub in 2011, before its closure and conversion to a convenience store

The lodge fell into disuse in 1913; the house being purchased by a builder, T Clark & Son, in 1927 for development. In the 1930s the main house and lodge were demolished to make way for housing. Coopers Brewery built a pub, The Castle, on the site of the house in 1935, which was converted into a Tesco Express convenience store in 2013.

The naturalist Chris Packham grew up in the suburb.

== Government ==
Midanbury is located within the Bitterne Park ward of Southampton, which is a unitary authority. Bitterne Park returns three councillors onto Southampton City Council. As at August 2015, all three represent the Conservative Party. The area forms part of the Southampton Itchen parliamentary constituency, whose member of parliament is Royston Smith, another Conservative, as at May 2019.

== Geography ==
In common with many city suburbs the boundaries of Midanbury are not well defined since the housing built on the Midanbury estate was constructed around the same time as surrounding areas and the old boundaries were not marked. The focal point of Midanbury today is small parade of shops at the top of Witts Hill, adjacent to the site of Midanbury Castle.
