= James Barlow Hoy =

Irish-born military surgeon and politician

- Born: James Barlow; 1793 or 1794; Dublin
- Died: 13 August 1843; Espitau de Vielha, Vielha e Mijaran, Spain
- Known for: Member of Parliament
- Political party: Conservative
- Spouse: Marian D'Oyley (1831–1843)
- Children: 2

James Barlow (Hoy), also styled James Barlow-Hoy (born James Barlow, 1794 or December 1793 – 13 August 1843) was an Irish-born military surgeon and politician who represented the Southampton constituency in the British parliament and also served as Deputy Lieutenant Sheriff of Southampton.

== Early life and inheritance ==
Barlow was born in Dublin, Ireland in 1794 or the final week of 1793 (he was reported to be aged 35 in a newspaper report on 26 December 1829). His mother's name was Anne, and his brother was Rev. Robert Joseph Barlow. There is not a direct record of Hoy's father, but if Hoy's brother is the same Robert Joseph Barlow that was admitted to Trinity College, Dublin on 6 November 1820, then their father was John Barlow, possibly a printer of Bolton Street in Dublin.

No details of Hoy's education are known. He served in the Ordnance Medical Department as a surgeon.

On 26 June 1828, Michael Hoy, a merchant of Bishopsgate, London and later Walthamstow (then in Essex) who specialised in trading with Russia, died. Michael Hoy had bought extensive property in Hampshire and the Isle of Wight, and left his estate, including some £90,000 as well as the property, to James Barlow, who was a distant cousin. Barlow left the army on 21 July that year and voluntarily adopted the name "Hoy" by royal licence on 26 January 1829.

== Political career ==
Michael Hoy had been an honorary burgess in Southampton since 1824 and his prestige helped James Barlow Hoy to secure the support of merchants in the area when he announced his candidacy to represent the city in the House of Commons in December 1829. His first speech was made from the house he had inherited at Midanbury. In that initial speech and his victory speeches, he emphasised his independence, insisting he would consider each issue on its own merits. He received 437 votes, with his closest rival, the radical John Storey Penleaze, receiving just 175, and Hoy was sworn in as MP for Southampton on 5 February 1830.

A general election followed later that same year and Hoy again emphasised his independence, "not calling myself Whig or Tory, a servant of ministry or radical reformer". He faced no opposition and thus returned to Parliament. He was appointed as a deputy lieutenant sheriff of Southampton in January 1831 but in another general election later that year he trailed badly and, after a four-day poll, he stood down. He had received 321 votes compared to Penleaze's 632 and 732 for the eventual winner, Arthur Atherley.

In February 1832 Hoy was invited to serve as sheriff of Southampton but he turned the opportunity down. He narrowly won his parliamentary seat back in the general election of 1832, beating Penleaze by 604 votes to 594, but Hoy was then accused of voter impersonation; apart from claiming to have no knowledge or involvement in the matter he offered no defence and he was unseated.

The 1835 election saw Hoy once again top the poll and this time he took his seat once more in Westminster. This time he was not contesting the seat against Penleaze, but with 508 votes he beat Abel Rous Dottin, John Easthope and Peregrine Bingham who received 492, 423 and 371 votes respectively. When Parliament was dissolved in 1837 he chose to retire. In 1841 the Prime Minister, Robert Peel, looked for Hoy to support a new Conservative Party candidate for Southampton and at that point, Hoy made it clear he had no intention of standing for Parliament again.

== Personal life ==
Hoy was acclaimed at archery and shooting, and in September 1830 he won first prize in the Southampton New Forest Archers' competition, having "'distinguished himself by the accuracy of his aim" in July of that year. He collected rare bird specimens as a hobby.

On 10 September 1831, after Hoy had lost his parliamentary seat, he married Marian D'Oyley, the daughter and heiress of Shearman Bird who owned Harold's Park near Waltham Abbey in Essex. Following the dissolution of Parliament in 1837, her health was declining, and the couple moved abroad.

The couple had an adopted daughter, Eleanor Maria Pera, and a daughter of their own, Louisa.

== Death ==
In August 1843, Hoy was again abroad due to his wife's ill health and he took the opportunity to pursue his hobby of seeking specimens of rare birds. He was with a shooting party in the Pyrenees and when crossing a ravine on the Spanish side of the border he dropped his gun and it fired, shattering his left arm. He was taken to the Hospice de Vielle, a hospital on the French side of the border, but died there of tetanus less than 24 hours after the accident. Hoy had accumulated large mortgage debts and the extent to which the wishes expressed in his will were fulfilled. Part of The Hermitage estate passed to Louisa, while Hoy's Widow, Marian, subsequently married John Richard Digby Beste, an author from Botley in Hampshire.

Parliament of the United Kingdom
Preceded by Abel Rous Dottin; William Chamberlayne	Member of Parliament for Southampton; 1830–1831; With: Abel Rous Dottin	Succeeded by Arthur Atherley; John Storey Penleaze
