= James Hoy =

James Hoy may refer to:

- James Hoy, Baron Hoy (1909–1976), Scottish politician and peer
- James Barlow Hoy (1794–1843), Irish-born military surgeon and politician
