= Walter Lang (disambiguation) =

Walter Lang was a film director.

Walter Lang or Lange may also refer to:

- Walter Lange (Wehrmacht officer), Knight's Cross of the Iron Cross recipient
- Walter Lange, MP
- Walter Lange (watchmaker), watchmaker with A. Lange & Söhne
