= Richard Goddard =

Richard Goddard may refer to:

== Politicians ==
- Richard Goddard (died 1596), MP for Southampton
- Richard Goddard (died 1666), MP for Winchester
- Richard Goddard (died 1732), MP for Wootton Bassett and Wiltshire

== Sports ==
- Richard Goddard (footballer) (born 1978), former Trinidad and Tobago football goalkeeper
- Richard Goddard (rugby league) (born 1974), English rugby league footballer who played in the 1990s and 2000s
- Richard Goddard-Crawley (born 1978), British semi-professional association football midfielder
- Dicky Goddard (1879–1949), English rugby union, and rugby league footballer who played in the 1890s and 1900s
- Spike Goddard (Richard Goddard, born 1992), Australian racing driver

== Others ==
- Dick Goddard (born 1931), American television meteorologist, author, cartoonist, and animal activist
- Rick Goddard, retired U.S. Air Force general and candidate for Congress

== See also ==
- Goddard (disambiguation)
