= Mascall =

Mascall is an English surname. Notable people with the surname include:

- Dernelle Mascall (born 1988), Tobagonian soccer player
- Eric Lionel Mascall (1905–1993), English theologian
- Jennifer Wootton Mascall (born 1952), Canadian modern dance choreographer, performer and teacher
- Leah Mascall (born 1995), Australian rules footballer
- Leonard Mascall (d. 1589), English author and translator
- Robert Mascall (d. 1416), English medieval Carmelite friar and bishop
- Roger Mascall, MP
- Sharon Mascall (born 1970), British-born Australian journalist
