= Humphrey St John-Mildmay =

English merchant banker and politician

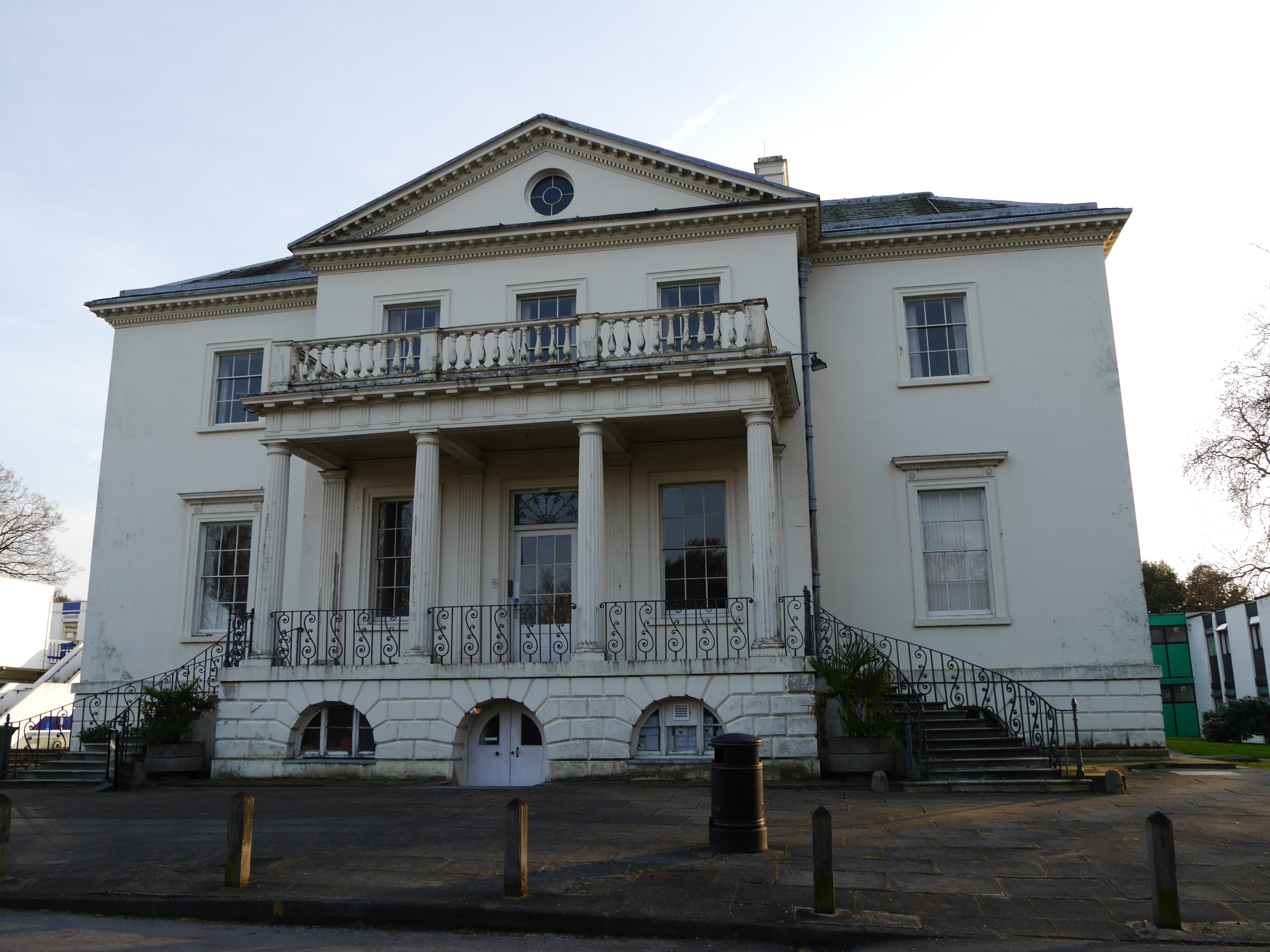
Mount Clare, front view

Humphrey St John-Mildmay (1794–1853) was an English merchant banker and politician, a partner with Baring Brothers.

== Life ==
St John-Mildmay joined the Coldstream Guards and served as a captain in the Peninsular War. After marrying Anne Baring, daughter of Alexander Baring in 1823 he was offered a partnership in the family bank. They had one child, Humphrey Francis St John-Mildmay (1825–1866)

St John-Mildmay was also appointed a Director of the Bank of England. He was Conservative MP for Southampton, Hampshire. He spoke and voted against the Slave Trade Suppression Bill in 1843.

He lived at Mount Clare, Roehampton from 1830–32.

Parliament of the United Kingdom
Preceded by Lord Bruce; Charles Cecil Martyn	Member of Parliament for Southampton; 1842–1847; With: George William Hope	Succeeded by Sir Alexander Cockburn, Bt; Brodie McGhie Willcox
