= John Mill (died 1555) =

English politician

John Mill (1474/76–1551) was an English politician.

He was a member (MP) of the parliament of England for Southampton in 1529 and 1539.
