= Allen Bathurst, Lord Apsley =

British politician (1895–1942)

Lord Apsley DSO MC TD DL

Member of Parliament for Southampton
- In office 1922–1929 Serving with Edwin Perkins
- Preceded by: Sir Ivor Philipps; William Dudley Ward
- Succeeded by: Ralph Morley; Tommy Lewis

Member of Parliament for Bristol Central
- In office 1931–1942
- Preceded by: Joseph Alpass
- Succeeded by: Lady Apsley

Personal details
- Born: Allen Algernon Bathurst; 3 August 1895
- Died: 17 December 1942 (aged 47) Malta
- Cause of death: Plane crash
- Resting place: Kalkara Naval Cemetery, Kalkara, Malta
- Party: Conservative
- Children: Henry Bathurst, 8th Earl Bathurst; George Bathurst
- Parents: Seymour Bathurst, 7th Earl Bathurst (father); Lilias Margaret Frances Borthwick (mother)

Allen Algernon Bathurst, Lord Apsley, DSO, MC, TD, DL (3 August 1895 – 17 December 1942) was a British Army officer and Conservative Party politician.

== Early life ==
Apsley was the eldest son of Seymour Bathurst, 7th Earl Bathurst and his wife Lilias Margaret Frances née Borthwick, daughter of Algernon Borthwick, 1st Baron Glenesk. He was educated at Eton and Christ Church, Oxford, graduating BA hons.

== Military career ==
During World War I, he served overseas with the Royal Gloucestershire Hussars. He was promoted to temporary lieutenant in April 1916, acting captain in June 1917, receiving a substantive promotion to lieutenant from the same date, and to substantive captain in 1918. He was awarded the Military Cross (MC) and appointed a Companion of the Distinguished Service Order (DSO) for his actions in Egypt:

Awarded the Distinguished Service Order.

[...]

Capt. Allen Algernon, Lord Apsley,. M.C., 1/1st Glouc. Yeo. (EGYPT)

On 30 September 1918, near Damascus, he was sent out with a troop of 20 men. and a Hotchkiss gun to seize the Kadem wireless station. Near Kadem Station he was held up by a body of the enemy, whose strength was double his own. He charged, killing 12 with his sword, the remainder being put to flight. On arrival at his objective the wireless station was found to have been already destroyed, and the enemy, who had been strongly reinforced, was threatening to cut off his troop. This officer carried out the retirement of the troop in perfect order, and, when attacked by the enemy from a flank, another charge was made, inflicting loss and enabling him to get away intact. Throughout this mission he showed splendid gallantry and marked ability to command.

== Political and business career ==
Shield in the Commons chamber Sable two bars Ermine in chief three crosses pattée Or.

He was elected as Member of Parliament (MP) for Southampton in 1922, holding the seat until 1929. He then stood for Bristol Central in 1931, and held the seat until his death in 1942. In 1923 he was appointed a Deputy Lieutenant for the "County of Gloucester, and of the City and County of the City of Gloucester, and the City and County of the City of Bristol."

During this time, he was Parliamentary Private Secretary to: the Under-Secretary of State for the Overseas Trade Department 1922–24, the Minister of Transport 1925-29 and the Minister for Co-ordination of Defence 1936. He had also been President of the UK Pilot's Association in 1925 and sometime chairman of Western Airways, Western Air Transport Company and a director of Morning Post. Lord and Lady Apsley published a book called The Amateur Settlers in 1929 recounting their escapades and adventures travelling through the Northern Territory of Australia. They had many encounters, including with local Aboriginal people, in which detailed descriptions reveal their social attitudes and behaviour.

He remained a member of the Territorial Army between the wars, and was awarded the Territorial Decoration (TD) in 1929, promoted to brevet major in 1930, and promoted to substantive major in 1938. During World War II, he served overseas again, with the Arab Legion (1941–42).

== Marriage ==
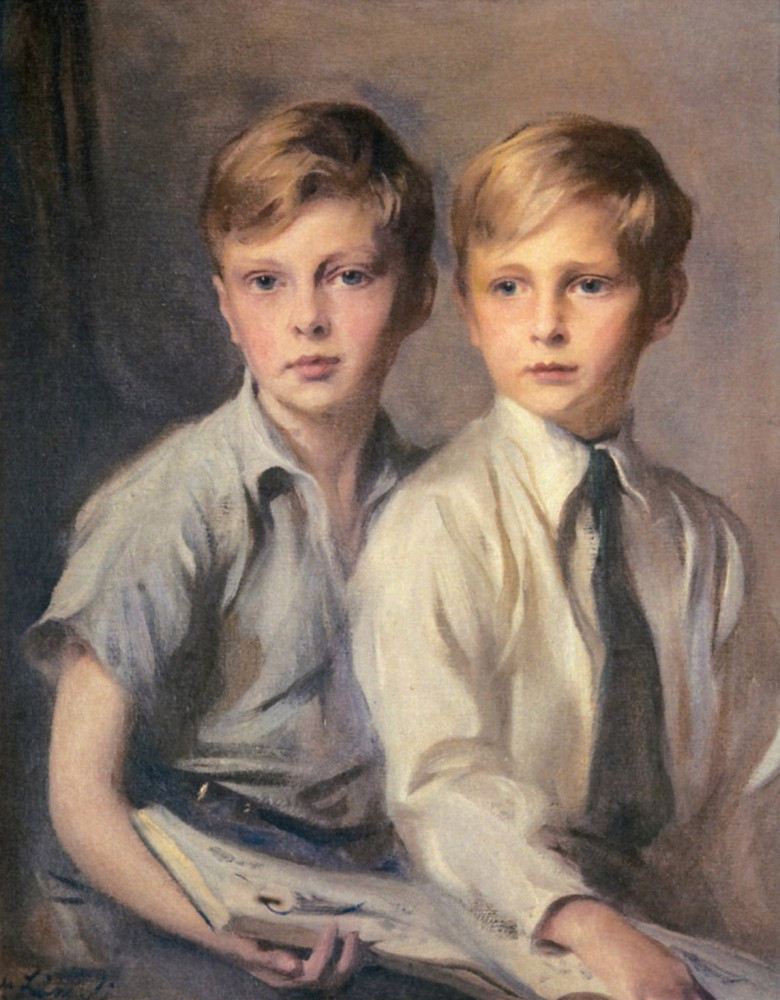
Lord Apsley's two sons in a portrait by Philip de László , 1936

On 27 February 1924, Lord Apsley had married Viola Meeking (who succeeded him as MP for Bristol Central) and they had two sons: Henry Allen John (1927–2011) and George Bertram (1929–2010). As Lord Apsley predeceased his father, the latter's earldom later passed to Lord Apsley's eldest son, Henry.

== Death ==
Lord Apsley was a passenger on a Handley Page Halifax of No. 138 Squadron RAF when it crashed on take-off from Malta, killing all on board. Apsley was buried with the other victims at Kalkara Naval Cemetery in Kalkara.

Parliament of the United Kingdom
Preceded by Sir Ivor Philipps and William Dudley Ward	Member of Parliament for Southampton; 1922 – 1929; With: Edwin Perkins	Succeeded by Ralph Morley and Tommy Lewis
Preceded by Joseph Alpass	Member of Parliament for Bristol Central; 1931 – 1942	Succeeded by Lady Apsley
