= Southampton (constituency) =

Former parliamentary constituency in the United Kingdom

- Former borough constituency for the House of Commons

1295–1950
- Seats: two
- Replaced by: Southampton Itchen and Southampton Test

Southampton was a parliamentary constituency which was represented in the English and, after 1707, British House of Commons. Centred on the town of Southampton, it returned two members of parliament (MPs) from 1295 until it was abolished for the 1950 general election.

== Boundaries ==
1885-1918: The existing Parliamentary borough, the parish of Milbrook, the ecclesiastical district of Holy Saviour, Bittern, the parish of St. Mary Extra, and the detached part of the parish of Hound included within the parish of St. Mary Extra.

== Members of Parliament ==
=== MPs 1295–1660 ===
Parliament	First member	Second member
1307	Sir William Russell of Yaverland	
1386	John Penkestone	Roger Mascall
1388 (February)	William Maple	John Scarlet
1388 (September)	Nicholas Sherwind	John Bigard
1390 (January)	William Maple	Thomas Appleby
1390 (November)		
1391	William Maple	Thomas Appleby
1393	William Maple	Thomas Appleby
1394	John Penkestone	Thomas Appleby
1395	Thomas Appleby	Thomas Marlborough
1397 (January)	Thomas Appleby	John Dering
1397 (September)	Walter Lange	John Dering
1399	Thomas Middleton	Richard Bradway
1401		
1402	Thomas Middleton	Thomas Marlborough
1404 (January)		
1404 (October)		
1406	Walter Lange	John Penkestone
1407		
1410		
1411	John Shipton	Thomas Marlborough
1413 (February)		
1413 (May)	Thomas Armorer	William Soper
1414 (April)	Thomas Armorer	Thomas Marlborough
1414 (November)	William Soper	Thomas Marlborough
1415	Thomas Marlborough	Benedict Wichford
1416 (March)	Thomas Marlborough	Benedict Wichford
1416 (October)		
1417	John Lucas	William Chamberlain
1419	William Soper	William Chamberlain
1420	William Soper	William Chamberlain
1421 (May)	Richard Thornes	Thomas Marlborough
1421 (December)	William Soper	John Mascall
1510–1515	No names known	
1523	Nicholas Dey	?
1529	Nicholas Dey	John Mill
1536	Nicholas Dey	?
1539	John Mill	John Huttoft
1542	John Huttoft	?
1545	?	
1547	Sir Robert Southwell	Thomas Mill
1553 (March)	James Stonard	?
1553 (October)	Sir Francis Fleming	Thomas Mill
1554 (April)	Richard Butler	James Brande
1554 (November)	James Brande	James Stonard
1555	James Brande	Thomas Fassmyn
1558	John Staveley	James Brande
1559	Thomas Beckingham	Edward Wilmott
1563	John Caplyn	James Brande
1571	Edward Horsey	Sir John Croke
1572	Sir Henry Wallop, posted to Ireland , replaced in 1581 by Fulke Greville	Nicholas Caplyn
1584	Thomas Digges	Thomas Godard
1586	John Penruddock	William Thorley
1588	Thomas Wilkes	Richard Goddard
1593	Sir Thomas Wilkes	Thomas Heton
1597	William Wallop	Francis Bacon, sat for Ipswich, repl. by Sir Oliver Lambert
1601	Thomas Fleming	Thomas Lambert
1604	Sir Thomas Fleming, made judge and repl. in 1604 by Sir Thomas Fleming	Sir John Jeffrys
1614	Sir Thomas Fleming	Thomas Cheeke
1621–1622	Sir Thomas Fleming	Henry Sherfield
1624	Sir John Mill, 1st Baronet	Henry Sherfield, sat for Salisbury, repl. by John Bonde
1625	Sir John Mill, 1st Baronet	George Gallop
1626	Sir John Mill, 1st Baronet	George Gallop
1628	John Major	George Gallop
1629–1640	No Parliaments summoned	
1640 (April)	Sir John Mill, 1st Baronet	Thomas Levington
1640 (November)	George Gallop	Edward Exton
1653	Southampton not represented in Barebones Parliament	
1654	John Lisle	(one seat only)
1656	John Lisle	(one seat only)
1659	Thomas Knollys	Roger Gallop
1659	Edward Exton	

=== MPs 1660–1832 ===
Year	First member	First party	Second member	Second party
1660	William Stanley		Robert Richbell	
1661	Sir Richard Ford (died 1678)		William Legge (died 1670)	
1670	Sir Richard Ford (died 1678)		Thomas Knollys	
1678	Sir Benjamin Newland		Thomas Knollys	
1679 (February)	Sir Benjamin Newland		Thomas Knollys	
1679 (August)	Sir Benjamin Newland		Sir Charles Wyndham	
1681	Sir Benjamin Newland		Sir Charles Wyndham	
1685	Sir Benjamin Newland		Sir Charles Wyndham	
1689	Sir Benjamin Newland		Richard Brett	
1689	Sir Benjamin Newland		Edward Fleming	
1689	Sir Benjamin Newland		Sir Charles Wyndham	
1698	Sir Benjamin Newland		John Smith	
1699	Roger Mompesson		John Smith	
January 1701	Roger Mompesson		Mitford Crowe	
November 1701	Adam de Cardonnel		Mitford Crowe	
1702	Adam de Cardonnel		Frederick Tylney	
1705	Adam de Cardonnel		Viscount Woodstock	
1708	Adam de Cardonnel		Simeon Stuart	
1710	Adam de Cardonnel		Richard Fleming	
1712	Roger Harris		Richard Fleming	
1715	Thomas Lewis		Richard Fleming	
1722	Thomas Lewis		Thomas Missing	
1727	Robert Eyre		Anthony Henley	
1729 by-election	Sir William Heathcote		Anthony Henley	
1734	Sir William Heathcote		John Conduitt	
1737 by-election	Sir William Heathcote		Thomas Lee Dummer	
1741	Peter Delmé		Edward Gibbon	
1747	Peter Delmé		Anthony Langley Swymmer	
1754	Hans Stanley		Anthony Langley Swymmer	
1760 by-election	Hans Stanley		Henry Dawkins	
1768	Hans Stanley		The Viscount Palmerston	
1774	Hans Stanley	Tory	John Fleming	Tory
January 1780 by-election	John 'Mad Jack' Fuller	Tory	John Fleming	Tory
Sep 1780	John 'Mad Jack' Fuller	Tory	Hans Sloane	Tory
1784	John Fleming	Tory	James Amyatt	Tory
1790	Henry Martin	Tory	James Amyatt	Tory
1795 by-election	George Henry Rose	Tory	James Amyatt	Tory
1806	George Henry Rose	Tory	Arthur Atherley	Whig
1807	George Henry Rose	Tory	Josias Jackson	Whig
1812	George Henry Rose	Tory	Arthur Atherley	Whig
March 1818 by-election	William Chamberlayne	Whig	Arthur Atherley	Whig
Jun 1818	William Chamberlayne	Whig	Sir William Champion de Crespigny, Bt	Whig
1826	William Chamberlayne	Whig	Abel Rous Dottin	Tory
Jan. 1830 by-election	James Barlow-Hoy	Tory	Abel Rous Dottin	Tory
1831	Arthur Atherley	Whig	John Storey Penleaze	Whig

=== MPs 1832–1950 ===
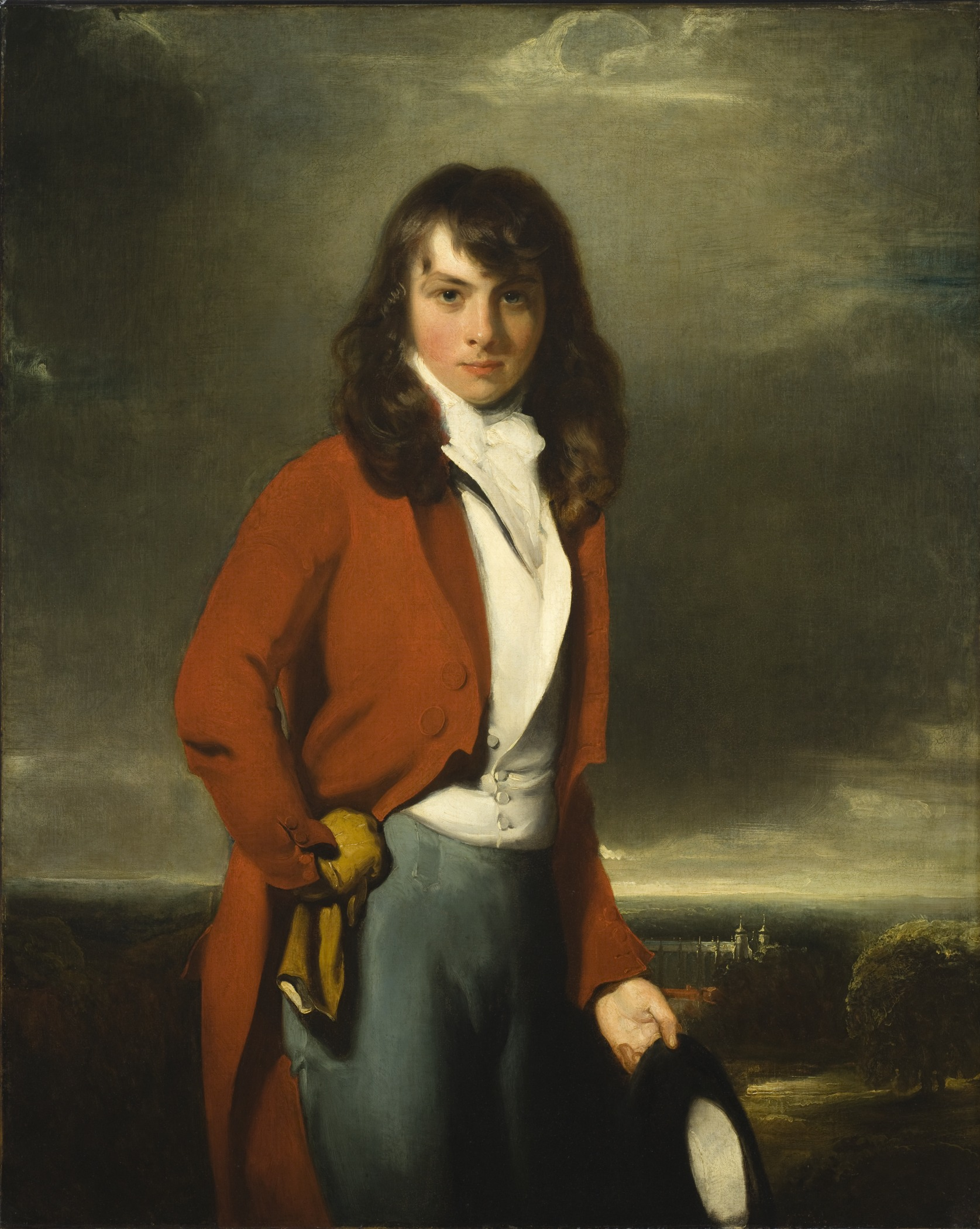
Portrait of Arthur Atherley by Thomas Lawrence

Election	First member	First party	Second member	Second party
1832	James Barlow-Hoy	Tory	Arthur Atherley	Whig
1833	John Storey Penleaze	Whig	Arthur Atherley	Whig
1835	James Barlow-Hoy	Conservative	Abel Rous Dottin	Conservative
1837	Viscount Duncan	Whig	Abel Rous Dottin	Conservative
1841	Lord Bruce	Conservative	Charles Cecil Martyn	Conservative
1842 by-election	Humphrey St John-Mildmay	Conservative	George William Hope	Conservative
1847	Sir Alexander Cockburn	Whig	Brodie McGhie Willcox	Whig
1857 by-election	Thomas Matthias Weguelin	Whig	Brodie McGhie Willcox	Whig
1859	William Digby Seymour	Liberal	Brodie McGhie Willcox	Liberal
1862 by-election	William Digby Seymour	Liberal	William Anderson Rose	Conservative
1865	Russell Gurney	Conservative	George Moffatt	Liberal
1868	Russell Gurney	Conservative	Peter Merrick Hoare	Conservative
1874	Russell Gurney	Conservative	Sir Frederick Perkins	Liberal
1878 by-election	Alfred Giles	Conservative	Sir Frederick Perkins	Liberal
1880	Henry Lee	Liberal	Charles Parker Butt	Liberal
1883 by-election	Henry Lee	Liberal	Alfred Giles	Conservative
1885	Sir John Commerell	Conservative	Alfred Giles	Conservative
1888 by-election	Francis Evans	Liberal	Alfred Giles	Conservative
1892	Francis Evans	Liberal	Tankerville Chamberlayne	Conservative
1895	Sir John Simeon, Bt.	Liberal Unionist	Tankerville Chamberlayne	Conservative
1896 by-election	Sir John Simeon, Bt.	Liberal Unionist	Sir Francis Evans	Liberal
1900	Sir John Simeon, Bt.	Liberal Unionist	Tankerville Chamberlayne	Conservative
1906	Sir Ivor Philipps	Liberal	William Dudley Ward	Liberal
1916	Sir Ivor Philipps	Coalition Liberal	William Dudley Ward	Coalition Liberal
Jan 1922	Sir Ivor Philipps	National Liberal	William Dudley Ward	National Liberal
1922	Edwin King Perkins	Conservative	Allen Bathurst	Conservative
1929	Ralph Morley	Labour	Tommy Lewis	Labour
1931	William Craven-Ellis	Conservative	Sir Charles Barrie	Liberal
Feb 1940 by-election	William Craven-Ellis	Conservative	Sir John Reith	National
Nov 1940 by-election	William Craven-Ellis	Conservative	Dr Russell Thomas	National Liberal
1945	Ralph Morley	Labour	Tommy Lewis	Labour
1950	constituency abolished: see Southampton Itchen and Southampton Test			

== Elections ==
=== Elections in the 1830s ===
Chamberlayne's death caused a by-election.

By-election, 13 January 1830: Southampton
Party	Candidate	Votes	%
Tory	James Barlow Hoy	437	71.4
Whig	John Storey Penleaze	175	28.6
Majority		262	42.8
Turnout		612	c. 36.0
Registered electors		c. 1,700	
Tory gain from Whig			

General election 1830: Southampton
Party	Candidate	Votes	%
Tory	James Barlow Hoy	Unopposed	
Tory	Abel Rous Dottin	Unopposed	
Registered electors		c. 1,700	
Tory hold			
Tory gain from Whig			

General election 1831: Southampton
Party	Candidate	Votes	%
Whig	Arthur Atherley	732	43.4
Whig	John Storey Penleaze	632	37.5
Tory	James Barlow Hoy	321	19.1
Majority		311	18.4
Turnout		1,018	c. 59.9
Registered electors		c. 1,700	
Whig gain from Tory			
Whig gain from Tory			

General election 1832: Southampton
Party	Candidate	Votes	%	±%
Whig	Arthur Atherley	645	30.8	−12.6
Tory	James Barlow Hoy	604	28.9	+19.4
Whig	John Storey Penleaze	594	28.4	−9.1
Tory	James Mackillop	249	11.9	+2.4
Turnout		1,046	74.6	c. +14.7
Registered electors		1,403		
Majority		41	2.1	−16.3
Whig hold		Swing	−11.8	
Majority		10	0.5	N/A
Tory gain from Whig		Swing	+15.1	

- On petition, Hoy was unseated in favour of Penleaze

General election 1835: Southampton
Party	Candidate	Votes	%	±%
Conservative	James Barlow Hoy	508	28.3	−0.6
Conservative	Abel Rous Dottin	492	27.4	+15.5
Whig	John Easthope	423	23.6	−7.2
Whig	Peregrine Bingham	371	20.7	−7.7
Majority		69	3.8	+3.3
Turnout		911	77.7	+3.1
Registered electors		1,403		
Conservative hold		Swing	+3.4	
Conservative gain from Whig		Swing	+11.5	

General election 1837: Southampton
Party	Candidate	Votes	%	±%
Conservative	Abel Rous Dottin	587	26.6	−1.7
Whig	Adam Haldane-Duncan	564	25.6	+2.0
Conservative	Charles Cecil Martyn	543	24.6	−2.8
Whig	Clarence Paget	509	23.1	+2.4
Turnout		1,107	77.3	−0.4
Registered electors		1,433		
Majority		23	1.0	−2.8
Conservative hold		Swing	−2.0	
Majority		21	1.0	N/A
Whig gain from Conservative		Swing	+2.1	

=== Elections in the 1840s ===
General election 1841: Southampton
Party	Candidate	Votes	%	±%
Conservative	James Bruce	648	27.0	+0.4
Conservative	Charles Cecil Martyn	645	26.8	+2.2
Whig	Edward John Hutchins	556	23.1	−2.5
Whig	Charles Edward Mangles	554	23.1	±0.0
Majority		89	3.7	+2.7
Turnout		1,202	76.9	−0.4
Registered electors		1,563		
Conservative hold		Swing	+0.8	
Conservative gain from Whig		Swing	+1.7	

The election was declared void on petition on 6 May 1842, due to bribery by Bruce and Martyn's agents, and a writ for a by-election was not moved until 1 August 1842.

By-election, 9 August 1842: Southampton
Party	Candidate	Votes	%	±%
Conservative	Humphrey St John-Mildmay	685	28.1	+1.1
Conservative	George William Hope	682	28.0	+1.2
Whig	George Nugent-Grenville	535	22.0	−1.1
Radical	George Thompson	532	21.9	−1.2
Majority		147	6.0	+2.3
Turnout		1,225	68.4	−8.5
Registered electors		1,790		
Conservative hold		Swing	+1.1	
Conservative hold		Swing	+1.2	

General election 1847: Southampton
Party	Candidate	Votes	%	±%
Whig	Brodie McGhie Willcox	Unopposed		
Whig	Alexander Cockburn	Unopposed		
Registered electors		2,258		
Whig gain from Conservative				
Whig gain from Conservative				

=== Elections in the 1850s ===
Cockburn was appointed Solicitor General for England and Wales, requiring a by-election.

By-election, 17 July 1850: Southampton
Party	Candidate	Votes	%	±%
Whig	Alexander Cockburn	Unopposed		
Whig hold				

Cockburn was appointed Attorney General for England and Wales, requiring a by-election.

By-election, 2 April 1851: Southampton
Party	Candidate	Votes	%	±%
Whig	Alexander Cockburn	Unopposed		
Whig hold				

General election 1852: Southampton
Party	Candidate	Votes	%	±%
Whig	Brodie McGhie Willcox	1,062	29.2	N/A
Whig	Alexander Cockburn	1,017	27.9	N/A
Conservative	Alexander Baillie-Cochrane	797	21.9	New
Conservative	Augustus Arthur Vansittart	767	21.1	New
Majority		220	6.0	N/A
Turnout		1,822 (est)	75.3 (est)	N/A
Registered electors		2,419		
Whig hold		Swing	N/A	
Whig hold		Swing	N/A	

Cockburn was appointed Attorney General for England and Wales, requiring a by-election.

By-election, 7 January 1853: Southampton
Party	Candidate	Votes	%	±%
Whig	Alexander Cockburn	1,098	64.8	+7.7
Conservative	Alexander Baillie-Cochrane	596	35.2	−7.8
Majority		502	29.6	+23.6
Turnout		1,694	65.8	−9.5
Registered electors		2,576		
Whig hold		Swing	+7.8	

Cockburn was appointed Recorder of Bristol, requiring a by-election.

By-election, 12 April 1854: Southampton
Party	Candidate	Votes	%	±%
Whig	Alexander Cockburn	Unopposed		
Whig hold				

Cockburn resigned after being appointed a Chief Justice of the Court of Common Pleas, causing a by-election.

By-election, 11 February 1857: Southampton
Party	Candidate	Votes	%	±%
Whig	Thomas Matthias Weguelin	994	37.1	−20.0
Conservative	Edward Butler	962	35.9	−7.1
Radical	Robert Andrews	726	27.1	N/A
Majority		32	1.2	−4.8
Turnout		2,682	76.5	+1.2
Registered electors		3,508		
Whig hold		Swing	−6.5	

General election 1857: Southampton
Party	Candidate	Votes	%	±%
Whig	Brodie McGhie Willcox	Unopposed		
Whig	Thomas Matthias Weguelin	Unopposed		
Registered electors		3,508		
Whig hold				
Whig hold				

General election 1859: Southampton
Party	Candidate	Votes	%	±%
Liberal	William Digby Seymour	1,331	37.5	N/A
Liberal	Brodie McGhie Willcox	1,204	33.9	N/A
Liberal	Thomas Matthias Weguelin	1,012	28.5	N/A
Majority		192	5.4	N/A
Turnout		1,774 (est)	47.5 (est)	N/A
Registered electors		3,730		
Liberal hold		Swing	N/A	
Liberal hold		Swing	N/A	

=== Elections in the 1860s ===
Willcox's death caused a by-election.

By-election, 6 December 1862: Southampton
Party	Candidate	Votes	%	±%
Conservative	William Anderson Rose	1,715	51.0	New
Liberal	Charles Edward Mangles	1,647	49.0	N/A
Majority		68	2.0	N/A
Turnout		3,362	81.5	+34.0
Registered electors		4,124		
Conservative gain from Liberal		Swing	N/A	

General election 1865: Southampton
Party	Candidate	Votes	%	±%
Conservative	Russell Gurney	1,565	24.6	N/A
Liberal	George Moffatt	1,527	24.1	N/A
Conservative	William Anderson Rose	1,422	22.4	N/A
Liberal	Thomas Miller Mackay	1,388	21.9	N/A
Liberal	William Digby Seymour	447	7.0	−30.5
Turnout		3,175 (est)	75.8 (est)	+28.3
Registered electors		4,189		
Majority		38	0.7	N/A
Conservative gain from Liberal		Swing	N/A	
Majority		105	1.7	−3.7
Liberal hold		Swing	N/A	

General election 1868: Southampton
Party	Candidate	Votes	%	±%
Conservative	Russell Gurney	2,393	27.6	+3.0
Conservative	Peter Merrick Hoare	2,178	25.1	+2.7
Liberal	George Moffatt	2,161	24.9	+0.8
Liberal	Frederick Maxse	1,947	22.4	+0.5
Majority		17	0.2	−0.5
Turnout		4,340 (est)	76.2 (est)	+0.4
Registered electors		5,696		
Conservative hold		Swing	+1.2	
Conservative gain from Liberal		Swing	+1.0	

=== Elections in the 1870s ===
General election 1874: Southampton
Party	Candidate	Votes	%	±%
Liberal	Frederick Perkins	2,724	28.1	+5.7
Conservative	Russell Gurney	2,534	26.1	−1.5
Liberal	George Moffatt	2,345	24.2	−0.7
Conservative	John Ralph Engledue	2,103	21.7	−3.4
Turnout		4,853 (est)	74.2 (est)	−2.0
Registered electors		6,537		
Majority		621	6.4	N/A
Liberal gain from Conservative		Swing	+4.1	
Majority		189	1.9	+1.7
Conservative hold		Swing	−2.0	

Gurney's death caused a by-election.

By-election, 17 Jun 1878: Southampton
Party	Candidate	Votes	%	±%
Conservative	Alfred Giles	2,552	52.6	+4.8
Liberal	Henry Mason Bompas	2,304	47.4	−4.9
Majority		248	5.2	+3.3
Turnout		4,856	69.2	−5.0
Registered electors		7,021		
Conservative hold		Swing	+4.9	

=== Elections in the 1880s ===
General election 1880: Southampton
Party	Candidate	Votes	%	±%
Liberal	Henry Lee	3,051	25.5	−2.6
Liberal	Charles Parker Butt	3,023	25.3	+1.1
Conservative	Alfred Giles	2,972	24.9	−1.2
Conservative	John Edmund Commerell	2,902	24.3	+2.6
Majority		51	0.4	−6.0
Turnout		5,974 (est)	80.8 (est)	+6.6
Registered electors		7,394		
Liberal hold		Swing	−2.6	
Liberal gain from Conservative		Swing	+1.2	

Butt resigned after being appointed a Judge of the Probate, Divorce and Admiralty division of the High Court of Justice, causing a by-election.

By-election, 7 Apr 1883: Southampton
Party	Candidate	Votes	%	±%
Conservative	Alfred Giles	Unopposed		
Conservative gain from Liberal				

General election 1885: Southampton
Party	Candidate	Votes	%	±%
Conservative	Alfred Giles	5,595	28.0	+3.1
Conservative	John Edmund Commerell	5,307	26.5	+2.2
Liberal	Henry Lee	4,566	22.8	−2.7
Liberal	Edwin Jones (British judge)	4,535	22.7	−2.6
Majority		741	3.7	N/A
Turnout		10,101 (est)	83.8	+3.0 (est)
Registered electors		12,061		
Conservative gain from Liberal				
Conservative gain from Liberal				

General election 1886: Southampton
Party	Candidate	Votes	%	±%
Conservative	Alfred Giles	5,023	27.7	−0.3
Conservative	John Edmund Commerell	4,726	26.0	−0.5
Liberal	John Henry Cooksey	4,384	24.1	+1.3
Liberal	James Carlile McCoan	4,029	22.2	−0.5
Majority		342	1.9	−1.8
Turnout		9,181 (est)	76.7	−7.1
Registered electors		12,061		
Conservative hold				
Conservative hold				

Commerell resigned, causing a by-election.

By-election, 23 May 1888: Southampton
Party	Candidate	Votes	%	±%
Liberal	Francis Evans	5,151	54.7	+8.4
Conservative	Arthur Guest	4,266	45.3	−8.4
Majority		885	9.4	N/A
Turnout		9,417	74.8	−1.9
Registered electors		12,596		
Liberal gain from Conservative				

=== Elections in the 1890s ===
General election 1892: Southampton
Party	Candidate	Votes	%	±%
Conservative	Tankerville Chamberlayne	5,449	26.8	+0.8
Liberal	Francis Evans	5,182	25.6	+1.5
Liberal	Charles Burt	4,920	24.3	+2.1
Conservative	Alfred Giles	4,734	23.3	−4.4
Majority		529	2.5	+0.6
Majority		448	2.3	N/A
Turnout		10,570	77.1	+1.3
Registered electors		13,717		
Conservative hold				
Liberal gain from Conservative				

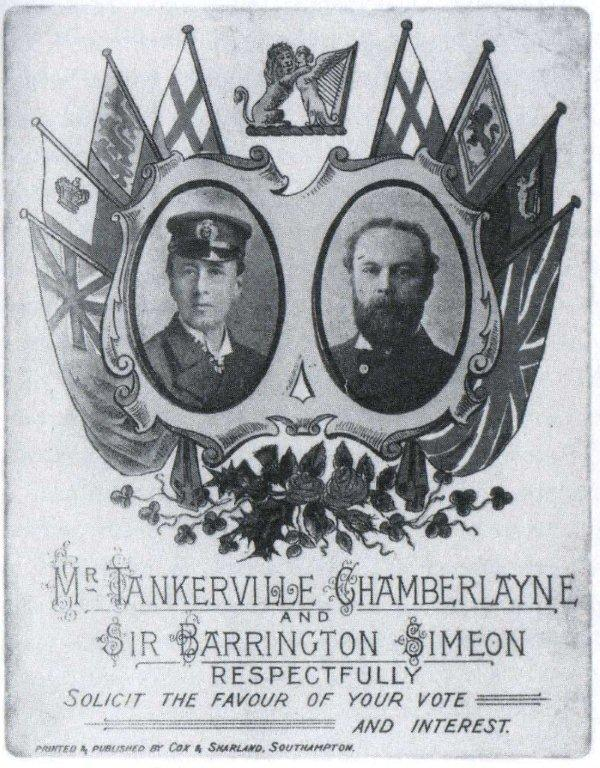
Chamberlayne & Simeon

General election 1895: Southampton
Party	Candidate	Votes	%	±%
Conservative	Tankerville Chamberlayne	5,924	27.5	+0.7
Liberal Unionist	John Simeon	5,390	25.0	+1.7
Liberal	Francis Evans	5,181	24.1	−1.5
Lib-Lab	Henry George Wilson	4,178	19.4	−4.9
Ind. Labour Party	Ramsay MacDonald	867	4.0	New
Majority		1,746	8.1	+5.6
Majority		209	0.9	N/A
Turnout		11,302	76.8	−0.3
Registered electors		14,725		
Conservative hold				
Liberal Unionist gain from Liberal				

1896 Southampton by-election (Note: Tankerville Chamberlayne was unseated on petition)
Party	Candidate	Votes	%	±%
Liberal	Francis Evans	5,555	48.9	+5.4
Conservative	George Candy	5,522	48.7	−3.8
Social Democratic Federation	Charles A. Gibson	274	2.4	New
Majority		33	0.2	N/A
Turnout		11,351	76.1	−0.7
Registered electors		14,919		
Liberal gain from Conservative				

=== Elections in the 1900s ===
Hyde

General election 1900: Southampton
Party	Candidate	Votes	%	±%
Conservative	Tankerville Chamberlayne	6,888	29.4	+1.9
Liberal Unionist	John Simeon	6,253	26.8	+1.8
Liberal	Francis Evans	5,575	23.9	−0.2
Liberal	Clarendon Hyde	4,652	19.9	+0.5
Majority		1,313	5.5	−2.6
Majority		1,601	6.9	+6.0
Turnout		23,368	72.6	−4.2
Registered electors		16,505		
Conservative hold				
Liberal Unionist hold				

Philipps

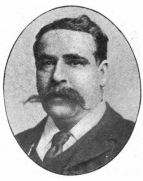
Quelch

General election 1906: Southampton
Party	Candidate	Votes	%	±%
Liberal	Ivor Philipps	7,032	26.4	+2.5
Liberal	Dudley Ward	6,255	23.4	+3.5
Conservative	Tankerville Chamberlayne	5,754	21.5	−7.9
Conservative	J. Aird	5,535	20.7	−6.1
Social Democratic Federation	Harry Quelch	2,146	8.0	New
Majority		501	1.9	N/A
Turnout		26,722	80.1	+7.5
Registered electors		17,613		
Liberal gain from Conservative				
Liberal gain from Liberal Unionist				

=== Elections in the 1910s ===
Giles

General election January 1910: Southampton
Party	Candidate	Votes	%	±%
Liberal	Ivor Philipps	8,878	26.5	+0.1
Liberal	Dudley Ward	8,830	26.4	+3.0
Conservative	Kenneth Balfour	7,874	23.6	+2.1
Conservative	Charles Tyrrell Giles	7,841	23.5	+2.8
Majority		956	2.8	+0.9
Turnout		33,423	83.5	+3.4
Registered electors		20,205		
Liberal hold				
Liberal hold				

Ward

General election December 1910: Southampton
Party	Candidate	Votes	%	±%
Liberal	Ivor Philipps	8,496	26.5	0.0
Liberal	Dudley Ward	8,449	26.4	0.0
Conservative	Kenneth Balfour	7,551	23.6	0.0
Conservative	Sir George Elliot Armstrong, 2nd Baronet	7,535	23.5	0.0
Majority		898	2.8	0.0
Turnout		32,031	80.0	−3.5
Registered electors		20,205		
Liberal hold				
Liberal hold				

By-election, 1917: Southampton
Party	Candidate	Votes	%	±%
National Liberal	Dudley Ward	Unopposed		
National Liberal hold				

Philipps

General election 1918: Southampton
Party		Candidate	Votes	%	±%
C	National Liberal	Ivor Philipps	26,884	36.4	+9.9
C	National Liberal	Dudley Ward	16,843	22.8	−3.6
	Unionist	Edwin King Perkins	15,548	21.0	−2.6
	Labour	Tommy Lewis	7,828	10.6	New
	Labour	Frederick Perriman	6,776	9.2	New
Majority			1,295	1.8	−1.0
Turnout			73,879	49.0	−31.0
Registered electors			75,334		
	Liberal hold				
	Liberal hold				
C indicates candidate endorsed by the coalition government.

=== Elections in the 1920s ===
General election 1922: Southampton
Party	Candidate	Votes	%	±%
Unionist	Edwin King Perkins	22,054	23.9	+2.9
Unionist	Allen Bathurst	20,351	22.0	N/A
Labour	Tommy Lewis	14,868	16.1	+5.5
Health	E.H.M. Stancomb	14,193	15.4	New
National Liberal	Ivor Philipps	11,576	12.5	−21.9
National Liberal	Dudley Ward	9,318	10.1	−12.7
Majority		5,483	5.9	N/A
Turnout		92,360	61.3	+12.3
Registered electors		75,316		
Unionist gain from Liberal				
Unionist gain from Liberal				

General election 1923: Southampton (2 seats)
Party	Candidate	Votes	%	±%
Unionist	Allen Bathurst	20,453	20.0	−2.0
Unionist	Edwin Perkins	20,249	19.8	−4.1
Labour	Tommy Lewis	17,208	16.9	+0.8
Labour	Reginald Sorenson	16,679	16.4	N/A
Liberal	Francis Jefferies Spranger	13,724	13.5	+1.0
Liberal	Neville Dixey	13,657	13.4	+3.3
Majority		3,041	2.9	−3.0
Turnout		101,970	66.4	+5.1
Registered electors		76,833		
Unionist hold				
Unionist hold				

General election 1924: Southampton (2 seats)
Party	Candidate	Votes	%	±%
Unionist	Allen Bathurst	30,703	29.3	+9.3
Unionist	Edwin Perkins	30,201	28.8	+9.0
Labour	Tommy Lewis	22,183	21.1	+4.2
Labour	Reginald Sorenson	21,768	20.8	+4.4
Majority		8,018	7.7	+4.8
Turnout		104,855	66.6	+0.2
Registered electors		78,776		
Unionist hold				
Unionist hold				

General election 1929: Southampton (2 seats)
Party	Candidate	Votes	%	±%
Labour	Tommy Lewis	32,249	22.4	+1.3
Labour	Ralph Morley	31,252	21.7	+0.9
Unionist	Ian Maitland	27,898	19.4	−9.9
Unionist	Alec Cunningham-Reid	26,801	18.6	−10.2
Liberal	John Howard Whitehouse	12,966	9.0	New
Liberal	Arthur Thomas Lamsley	12,836	8.9	New
Majority		3,354	2.3	N/A
Turnout		144,002	69.5	+2.9
Registered electors		103,653		
Labour gain from Unionist				
Labour gain from Unionist				

=== Elections in the 1930s ===
General election 1931: Southampton (2 seats)
Party	Candidate	Votes	%	±%
Unionist	William Craven-Ellis	54,699	33.9	+14.5
National Liberal	Charles Barrie	54,269	33.6	+15.0
Labour	Tommy Lewis	26,425	16.4	−6.0
Labour	Ralph Morley	26,061	16.1	−5.6
Majority		28,274	17.5	N/A
Majority		28,208	17.5	N/A
Turnout		161,454	75.2	+5.7
Registered electors		107,376		
Unionist gain from Labour				
National Liberal gain from Labour				

General election 1935: Southampton (2 seats)
Party	Candidate	Votes	%	±%
Unionist	William Craven-Ellis	44,896	30.0	−3.9
National Liberal	Charles Barrie	43,697	29.3	−4.3
Labour	Tommy Lewis	30,751	20.6	+4.2
Labour	Ralph Morley	30,028	20.1	+4.0
Majority		14,145	9.4	−8.1
Majority		13,669	9.2	−8.3
Turnout		149,372	67.9	−7.3
Registered electors		110,047		
Unionist hold				
National Liberal hold				

=== Elections in the 1940s ===
By-election, February 1940: Southampton (2 seats) (Note: Held due to Charles Barrie's resignation)
Party	Candidate	Votes	%	±%
National	John Reith	Unopposed		
National gain from National Liberal				

By-election, November 1940: Southampton (2 seats) (Note: Held due to John Reith's elevation to the House of Lords)
Party	Candidate	Votes	%	±%
National Liberal	Russell Thomas	Unopposed		
National Liberal gain from National				

General election 1945: Southampton (2 seats)
Party	Candidate	Votes	%	±%
Labour	Ralph Morley	37,556	28.8	+8.7
Labour	Tommy Lewis	37,054	28.4	+7.8
National	William Craven-Ellis	24,367	18.7	−11.3
National Liberal	Russell Thomas	22,650	17.3	−12.0
Liberal	Reginald Fulljames	8,878	6.8	New
Majority		12,687	9.7	N/A
Majority		14,404	11.1	N/A
Turnout		130,505	68.0	+0.1
Registered electors		95,898		
Labour gain from National				
Labour gain from National Liberal				

== Sources ==
- Craig, F. W. S. (1983) [1969]. British parliamentary election results 1918–1949 (3rd ed.). Chichester: Parliamentary Research Services. ISBN 0-900178-06-X.
- Leigh Rayment's Historical List of MPs – Constituencies beginning with "S" (part 3)
