= Russell Thomas (politician) =

Welsh Liberal politician, barrister and physician

Russell Thomas

William Stanley Russell Thomas (5 February 1896 – 21 March 1957) was a physician, barrister and Welsh Liberal politician who served as a Liberal National Member of Parliament.

== Life ==
Thomas was born at Talgarth. He was educated at Brecon Grammar School, Christ College, Brecon, and Queens' College, Cambridge. He qualified MB BChir at Guy's Hospital in 1919 and was awarded the Treasurer's gold medal in clinical medicine. He held resident appointments at Guy's Hospital and Sheffield Royal Hospital and was assistant medical officer at West Riding Asylum in Wafefield. He was called to the Bar by Lincoln's Inn in 1930.

Thomas advocated for animal welfare. He was a council member of the RSPCA 1943–1954 and chairman 1951–1952.

He died at his home in Warlingham, aged 61.

== Politician ==
=== Ilford ===
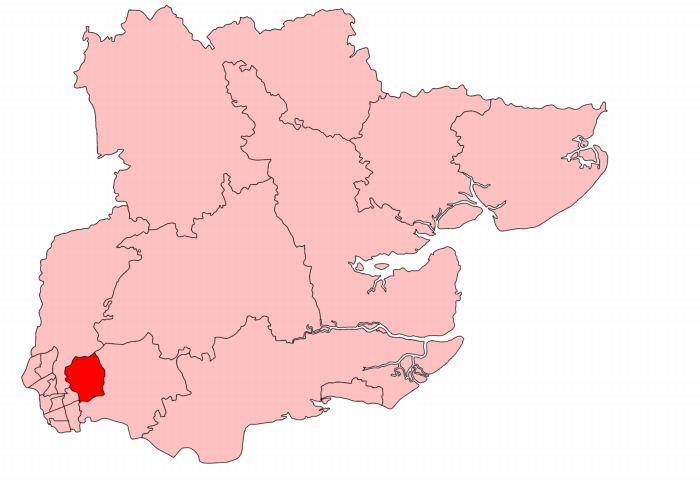
Ilford in Essex, showing boundaries used in 1931

He was Liberal candidate for Ilford in the 1931 election. It was a promising seat which the Liberals had nearly gained from the Conservatives in 1929. At the 1931 elections, the Liberal party was split into three groups and Thomas remained with the official Liberals under Sir Herbert Samuel, in support of the National Government. He finished third in Ilford, just behind the Labour candidate. He remained loyal to the official Liberal party when it left the National government in 1932.

=== Aberdeenshire Central ===
Despite his poor showing at Ilford in 1931, for the 1935 election he was selected as Liberal candidate in the promising constituency of Aberdeenshire Central where the Liberal in 1931 finished a close second behind the Conservative in a two-party contest. However, in 1935, the Labour party intervened and in a three-way contest Thomas finished third, again just behind Labour.

General election 1935 Electorate 39,984
Party	Candidate	Votes	%	±%
Unionist	Robert Smith	14,697		
Labour	G. Stott	6,128		
Liberal	Russell Thomas	5,873		
Majority				
Turnout				
Unionist hold		Swing		

=== Ross & Cromarty ===
His next attempt to enter parliament was also in Scotland at the 1936 Ross and Cromarty by-election. In 1935, the Liberal National candidate was re-elected unopposed. When the by-election came around, a minority section of the local Liberal Association wanted a Liberal to stand and were unhappy when the majority decided to support a National Labour candidate. The Scottish Liberal Federation persuaded Thomas to stand as a Liberal candidate. However, the result was a disaster for Thomas as he finished fourth.

1936 Ross and Cromarty by-election Electorate
Party	Candidate	Votes	%	±%
National Labour	Malcolm MacDonald	8,949	49.5	−27.2
Labour	Hector McNeil	5,967	33.0	+9.7
Unionist	Randolph Churchill	2,427	13.4	N/A
Liberal	Russell Thomas	738	4.1	N/A
Majority		2,982	16.5	
National hold		Swing	N/A	

Following this disappointment, Thomas decided to switch his support from the official Liberal party to the Liberal National party.

=== Southampton ===
His connection with the Liberal Nationals was far more rewarding when he was chosen as the National government's candidate for the 1940 by-election in Southampton. By then, a war time electoral truce between the main political parties was in operation, so Thomas was returned unopposed.

By-election, November 1940: Southampton (Note: Held due to John Reith's elevation to the House of Lords)
Party	Candidate	Votes	%	±%
National Liberal	Russell Thomas	Unopposed		
National Liberal gain from National				

At the 1945 general election, Thomas sought re-election as a Liberal National candidate in support of Winston Churchill. Southampton was a dual member seat and he ran in tandem with a Conservative against two Labour candidates and a Liberal. However, he lost his seat and finished fourth.

General election 1945: Southampton (2 seats)
Party	Candidate	Votes	%	±%
Labour	Ralph Morley	37,556	28.8	+8.7
Labour	Tommy Lewis	37,054	28.4	+7.8
National	William Craven-Ellis	24,367	18.7	−11.3
National Liberal	Russell Thomas	22,650	17.3	−12.0
Liberal	Reginald Fulljames	8,878	6.8	New
Majority		12,687	9.7	N/A
Majority		14,404	11.1	N/A
Turnout		130,505	68.0	+0.1
Registered electors		95,898		
Labour gain from National				
Labour gain from National Liberal				

=== Middlesbrough East ===
Thomas contested Middlesbrough East in the 1950 general election, however, this time not as a Liberal National but as an official Liberal candidate. He came third with 10% of the vote.

General election 1950: Middlesbrough East
Party	Candidate	Votes	%	±%
Labour	Hilary Marquand	29,185	62.77	
Conservative	Alfred Edwards	12,402	26.67	
Liberal	Russell Thomas	4,540	9.76	New
Communist	N Levy	367	0.79	New
Majority		16,783	36.10	
Turnout		46,494	82.90	
Labour hold		Swing		

=== Brecon & Radnor ===
Despite his Welsh heritage, none of his previous electoral challenges was in his native Wales. However he was selected as Liberal candidate for Brecon & Radnor for the 1955 General election. Having been raised in Brecon, he might have had hopes of winning. However, the Liberals had not contested the seat in 1951 and in 1950, their candidate finished a poor third. The 1955 elections represented the lowest point in the fortunes of the Liberal party and Thomas was to finish third once again.

General election 1955: Brecon and Radnor Electorate 51,969
Party	Candidate	Votes	%	±%
Labour	Tudor Watkins	23,953	53.10	
Conservative	Henry Graham Partridge	16,412	36.38	
Liberal	Russell Thomas	4,745	10.52	
Majority		7,541	16.72	
Turnout			86.80	
Labour hold		Swing		

This was to be his electoral swansong.

Parliament of the United Kingdom
Preceded by William Craven-Ellis; John Reith	Member of Parliament for Southampton; 1940–1945; With: William Craven-Ellis	Succeeded by Ralph Morley; Tommy Lewis
