= William Anderson Rose =

British politician (1820–1881)

Alderman Sir William Anderson Rose (16 August 1820 – 9 June 1881) was a businessman, MP and Lord Mayor of London.

Rose was educated at St Olave's Grammar School and University College London. He served as a Sheriff of the City of London for 1855 and was elected Lord Mayor of London for 1862. He was elected as Conservative MP for Southampton from 1862 to 1865.

He was appointed Colonel of the Royal London Militia on 16 November 1870, and after retirement was appointed Honorary Colonel of the regiment on 12 June 1880.

Parliament of the United Kingdom
Preceded by William Digby Seymour and Brodie McGhie Willcox	Member of Parliament for Southampton; 1862–1865; With: William Digby Seymour	Succeeded by Russell Gurney and George Moffatt
Civic offices
Preceded by William Cubitt	Lord Mayor of the City of London; 1862	Succeeded by William Lawrence
