= John Croke (died c. 1600) =

English politician

John Croke (died c. 1600) was an English politician.

He was a member (MP) of the parliament of England for Southampton in 1571. He also served as Mayor of Southampton for 1568–69 and 1584–85.
