= John Dering (MP for Southampton) =

John Dering (fl. 1397), of Southampton, was an English Member of Parliament (MP).

He was a Member of the Parliament of England for Southampton in January 1397 and September 1397.
