= Ivor Philipps =

British officer and Liberal Party politician

Major-General Sir Ivor Philipps KCB DSO
- Philipps in c. 1905

Member of Parliament for Southampton
- In office 12 January 1906 – 15 November 1922 Serving with William Dudley Ward
- Preceded by: Sir John Simeon, 4th Baronet
- Succeeded by: Edwin King Perkins

Personal details
- Born: 9 September 1861 Warminster, Wiltshire
- Died: 15 August 1940 (aged 78) Vincent Square, London
- Party: Liberal Party

Military service
- Allegiance: United Kingdom
- Branch/service: British Army; British Indian Army
- Years of service: 1881–1916
- Rank: Major-General
- Commands: 38th (Welsh) Infantry Division (1915–16); 115th Brigade (1914–15); Pembroke Yeomanry (1908–12)
- Battles/wars: Third Anglo-Burmese War; North-West Frontier; Tirah Campaign; Boxer Rebellion; First World War
- Awards: Knight Commander of the Order of the Bath; Distinguished Service Order; Mentioned in Despatches

Sir Ivor Philipps, KCB, DSO (9 September 1861 – 15 August 1940) was a British officer in the Indian Amy and a Liberal Party politician. He held a seat in the House of Commons from 1906 to 1922.

== Early life ==
Philipps was the son of Rev. Sir J. E. Philipps, Bt. and his wife Mary Margaret, daughter of Rev. Samuel Best and sister of George Best, 5th Baron Wynford. His older brother John Philipps (1860–1938) was a Liberal Party politician who became Baron St Davids in 1908 and Viscount St Davids in 1918; his younger brothers include Lord Kylsant and Lord Milford. Philipps was educated at Felsted School.

== Military career ==
Sir Ivor Philipps

Phillips served in the British Army from 1881 to 1883, in the Manchester Regiment, then he joined the Indian Army in 1883 as a lieutenant. He was promoted captain on 12 Mat 1894 and to major on 10 July 1901. He fought in the Third Anglo-Burmese War from 1885 to 1889, in the Miranzai Expedition in 1891, the Isazai Expedition in 1892, and after attending the Staff College, Camberley, from 1895 to 1896, with the Tirah Field Force from 1897 to 1898. He was appointed to a staff position at Indian army headquarters on 28 November 1899, as Deputy Assistant Quartermaster-General for Mobilization.

With the outbreak of the Boxer Rebellion in China the following summer he was temporary attached to the China Field Force from June 1900, and served in China until 1901 as Quartermaster-General. He was awarded the Distinguished Service Order (DSO) in November 1900, in recognition of services during the Boxer Rebellion. While still serving as a seconded officer on special service in China, he formally resigned from his staff position at the India army headquarters in May 1902,

He retired from the army in 1903, and joined the Pembroke Yeomanry as second-in-command, becoming commander from 1908 to 1912.

On the outbreak of the First World War, he initially served in the War Office, and in November 1914 he was promoted to Brigadier-General in command of the 115th Brigade. In January 1915 he took command of the 38th (Welsh) Infantry Division, bringing the division to France, and after a break while he held ministerial office in London he led the division during the first assault on Mametz Wood, at the Battle of the Somme in 1916.

== Politics ==
At the 1906 general election, Philipps was elected as a Member of Parliament (MP) for Southampton. At each of the previous two general elections, the city's two parliamentary seats had been won by a Conservative and a Liberal Unionist; in 1906 the Liberals won both seats. Philipps was re-elected in Southampton at both the January 1910 and December 1910 general elections, along with his fellow Liberal William Dudley Ward. He served in 1915 as Parliamentary Secretary to the Ministry of Munitions, and was made a Knight Commander of the Order of the Bath in 1917.

During the 1918 general election, both Philipps and Ward were re-elected as Coalition Liberals, i.e. as holders of the "coalition coupon", a sent to parliamentary candidates at the 1918 election endorsing them as official representatives of the Coalition Government. However, Philipps and Ward were both defeated at the 1922 general election by Conservative Party candidates, and neither stood again.

== Pembroke Castle ==
In 1928 Philipps purchased Pembroke Castle and commenced an extensive programme of restoration and rebuilding. Since his death, the castle has been managed jointly by the Philipps family and Pembroke town council.

== Personal life ==
In 1891 he married Marian Isobel, a daughter of James Buchan Mirrlees, of Glasgow.

Military offices
New title	GOC 38th (Welsh) Division; 1915–1916	Succeeded by Charles Blackader
Parliament of the United Kingdom
Preceded by Tankerville Chamberlayne; Sir John Simeon	Member of Parliament for Southampton; 1906–1922; With: William Dudley Ward	Succeeded by Edwin King Perkins; Lord Apsley
