= Josias Jackson =

Colonel Josias Jackson (28 June 1765 – 30 August 1819) was a British military officer and politician who represented Southampton in the House of Commons of the United Kingdom from 1807 to 1812. Born into the planter class of the British West Indies, Jackson fought in the Second Carib War in 1795 before moving to Portsmouth, England, in 1803. There, he became colonel of a British Volunteer Corps unit before becoming a member of parliament for Southampton for five years. During his time in the British Parliament, Jackson defended slavery and plantation owners. Following the end of his political career in England he returned to Saint Vincent and sat on the island's council. The slave plantations he owned were divided among his sons after Jackson's death in 1819.

== Early life ==
Jackson was born on 28 June 1765. He was the second son of Josias Jackson who owned five plantations in Saint Vincent, and Elizabeth Gerrald, of Saint Kitts. He received an education at a boarding school in England and in 1785 married Jenetta Barnewell from Demerara. Jackson participated in the Second Carib War with the indigenous people of Saint Vincent that began in 1795. His brother, John Mills Jackson, blamed the war for the loss of a considerable portion of the family's property and fortune.

== In Southampton ==
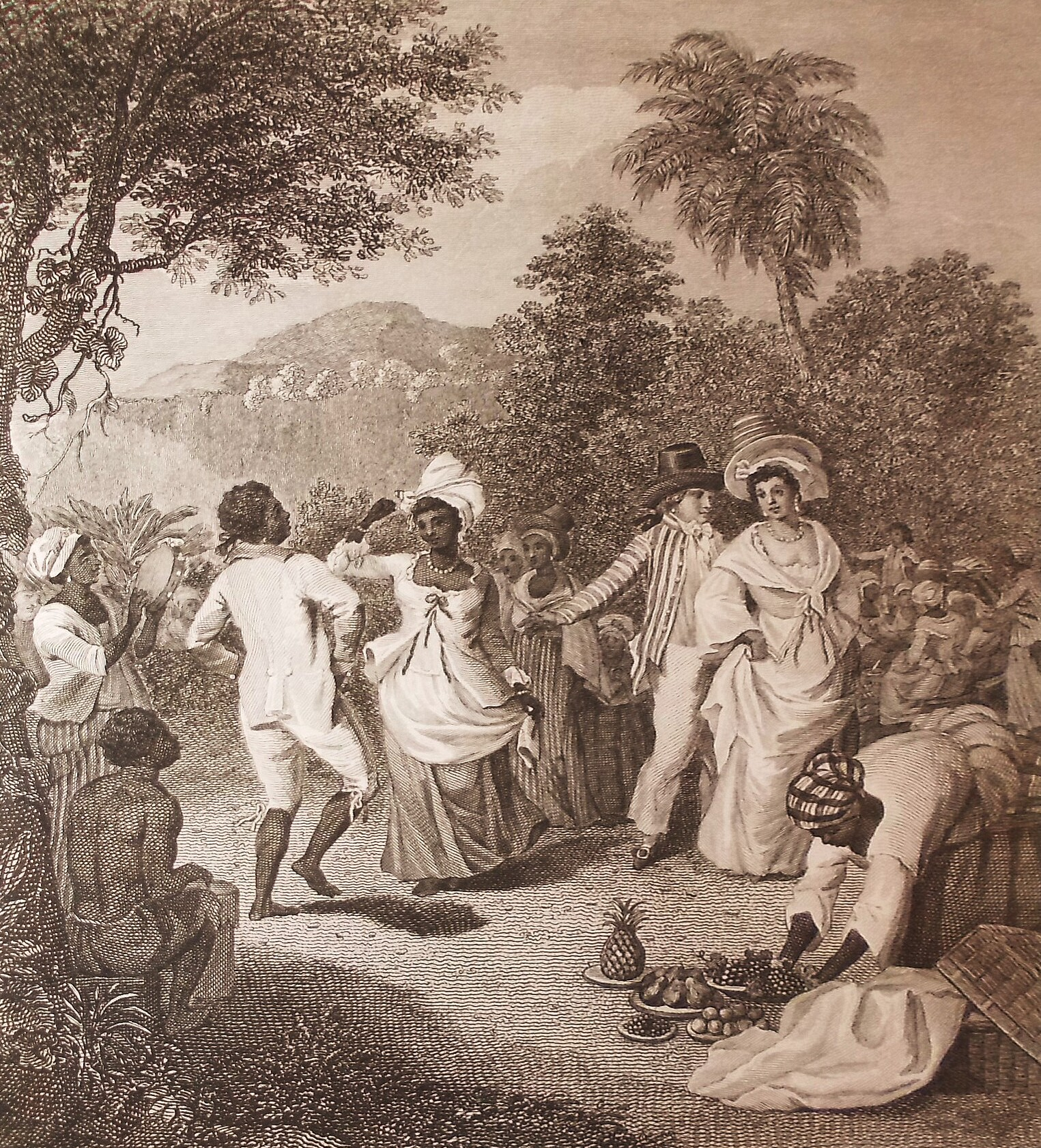
c. 1801 engraving of Saint Vincent, where Jackson spent much of his life

In 1803 Jackson moved to Southampton, England, and served as colonel of a British Volunteer Corps unit. He lost an 1806 dispute with the Southampton Corporation over the cutting down of trees on Northern Common. Jackson was opposed to the 1807 British abolition of the slave trade. Jackson stood in the 1806 United Kingdom general election but lost out to Arthur Atherley after failing to win the support of William Grenville's government. Atherley did not stand in the 1807 United Kingdom general election and Jackson won the seat unopposed.

Jackson made little impact in parliament and is not known to have spoken in the chamber until 29 July 1812 when he made a statement in support of plantation owners in the West Indies against criticism made by Hugh Elliot, governor of the Leeward Islands. He stated that the plantation owners were humane and kind to their slaves. Jackson campaigned ahead of the general election of 1812 but withdrew before polling day.

== Later life and death ==
Jackson later left Southampton, where he had tried unsuccessful to improve trade with the West Indies, and returned to the Caribbean. By 1819 Jackson held a seat on the council of Saint Vincent. He died in Saint Vincent on 30 August 1819. A dispute over his will was not resolved until 1834 when his plantations were divided among his sons.

Parliament of the United Kingdom
Preceded by Arthur Atherley; George Henry Rose	Member of Parliament for Southampton; 1807–1812; With: George Henry Rose	Succeeded by Arthur Atherley; George Henry Rose
