= Edwin Perkins (politician) =

British politician (1855–1937)

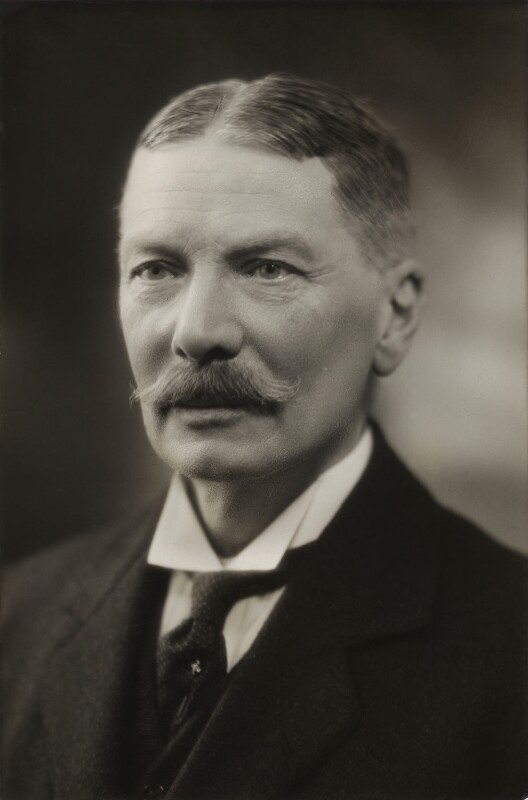
Perkins in 1924

Colonel Sir Edwin King Perkins, CBE, VD (28 February 1855 – 8 January 1937) was a British Conservative Party politician.

Perkins was an officer in the Volunteer Force, serving in the Hampshire Regiment where he was lieutenant-colonel in command of the 2nd volunteer battalion, and held the honorary rank of colonel. He resigned his commission with the Hampshire regiment on 3 December 1902, and received the Volunteer Decoration (VD) for his service. He was also appointed a captain in the Reserve on 29 June 1887, from which he resigned on 22 November 1902.

At the 1918 general election, he unsuccessfully contested the two-seat Southampton constituency, when both seats were won by Coalition Liberals. At the 1922 general election, when the coalition government had been dissolved, Perkins and the other Conservative candidate Lord Apsley won both seats, defeating the Liberal incumbents. They held the seats until the 1929 general election, which neither Perkins nor Apsley contested.

Perkins was knighted in the Dissolution Honours on 12 July 1929, for political and public services.

Parliament of the United Kingdom
Preceded by Sir Ivor Philipps and William Dudley Ward	Member of Parliament for Southampton; 1922 – 1929; With: Lord Apsley	Succeeded by Ralph Morley and Tommy Lewis
