= William Stanley (MP for Southampton) =

Member of the Parliament of England

William Stanley (c. 1610–1678) was an English merchant and politician who sat in the House of Commons in 1660.

Stanley was the son of Henry Stanley (died 1613), merchant of Chichester, Sussex and his wife Anne Madgweke, daughter of William Madgweke of Hampshire. He was apprenticed to a grocer in Southampton in 1623, and became a pawnbroker, a shipowner, and a merchant trading with Newfoundland. In 1630, he became a Freeman of Southampton. He was steward from 1641 to 1642, bailiff from 1643 to 1645 and mayor of Southampton from 1645 to 1646. In 1646 he became an alderman and from 1647 to 1650 was commissioner for assessment for Southampton. He was removed from office as alderman in 1655 for being disaffected to the regime, and was replaced by an alderman "of greater piety and integrity".

Stanley was commissioner for militia for Southampton in March 1660. In April 1660, he was elected Member of Parliament for Southampton in the Convention Parliament. He was commissioner for assessment for Hampshire from August 1660 to 1663 and was mayor of Southampton again from 1661 to 1662. He was commissioner for corporations for Hampshire from 1662 to 1663 and was restored to his position as alderman in 1662 by the commissioners. He supplied the dockyards with oil, balks and rosin. From 1663 he was commissioner for assessment for Southampton. He was sheriff of Southampton from 1669 to 1670, during which time the Duke of York James II of England stayed at his house during the royal visit to Southampton. He was commissioner for assessment for Hampshire from 1673 until his death.

Stanley died at the age of about 68 and was buried at Holy Rood church on 7 August 1678.

Stanley married Averne Ticheon of Hursley, Hampshire on 8 October 1632. They had three sons and two daughters.

Parliament of England
Preceded by Edward Exton	Member of Parliament for Southampton; 1660; With: Robert Richbell	Succeeded by William Legge; Sir Richard Ford
