= Nicholas Sherwind =

Nicholas Sherwind (fl. 1388), of Southampton, was an English Member of Parliament (MP).

He was a Member of the Parliament of England for Southampton in September 1388.
