= Thomas Armorer =

English politician

Thomas Armorer (died 1428/1429) was an English politician. He sat as MP for Southampton in May 1413 and April 1414.

He also served as commissioner of inquiry in Southampton in May 1398 concerning possessions of the God's House withheld from Queen's Hall, Oxford; steward of Southampton from Michaelmas 1400 till 1401, 1402 till 1403; bailiff of Southampton from 1404 till 1405 and 1406 till 1415 and alderman from 1416 till 1418.

By 1404, he was married to a woman called Isabel. By May 1427, he was married to his second wife, Maud, the granddaughter of Walter Thuddon of Binsted, Hertfordshire.
