= Ralph Morley =

Ralph Morley (25 October 1882 – 14 June 1955) was a Labour politician in the United Kingdom. He was a Member of Parliament (MP) from 1929 to 1931, and from 1945 until his death.

Born in Chichester, Morley was educated privately, then at University College Southampton, before becoming a schoolteacher. He joined the Social Democratic Federation, and served as the secretary of its Southampton branch from 1908 until 1913, but later moved to the Independent Labour Party. He was also president of Southampton Trades Council in 1911 and 1920, and was active in the Southampton Class Teachers' Association and the National Union of Teachers. He was elected to Southampton Urban District Council, and was its chair in 1920.

At the 1929 general election, he and Tommy Lewis were elected as the first Labour MPs for the two-seat Southampton constituency. They both lost their seat at the 1931 general election, having been among the majority of Labour MPs who refused to follow the Prime Minister and Labour Party Leader Ramsay MacDonald into a coalition with the Conservatives to form the National Government.

Morley and Lewis returned to the House of Commons in the Labour landslide at the 1945 general election. When the two-seat Southampton constituency was divided at the 1950 general election, Morley was returned for the new Southampton Itchen constituency, which he represented until stepping down at the 1955 general election.

== Outside Parliament ==
Before and during World War II, Morley taught at Sholing Boys' School, Southampton. He is commemorated in local schools by the Ralph Morley Essay Competition.

At Richard Taunton College, he is commemorated by the 'Ralph Morley Memorial Prize'.

The Ralph Morley Memorial Fund was a registered charity from 1980 to 1999 which awarded prizes for students who had successfully completed a Diploma in Education course at the University of Southampton's Institute of Education, and for students attending secondary schools in Southampton.

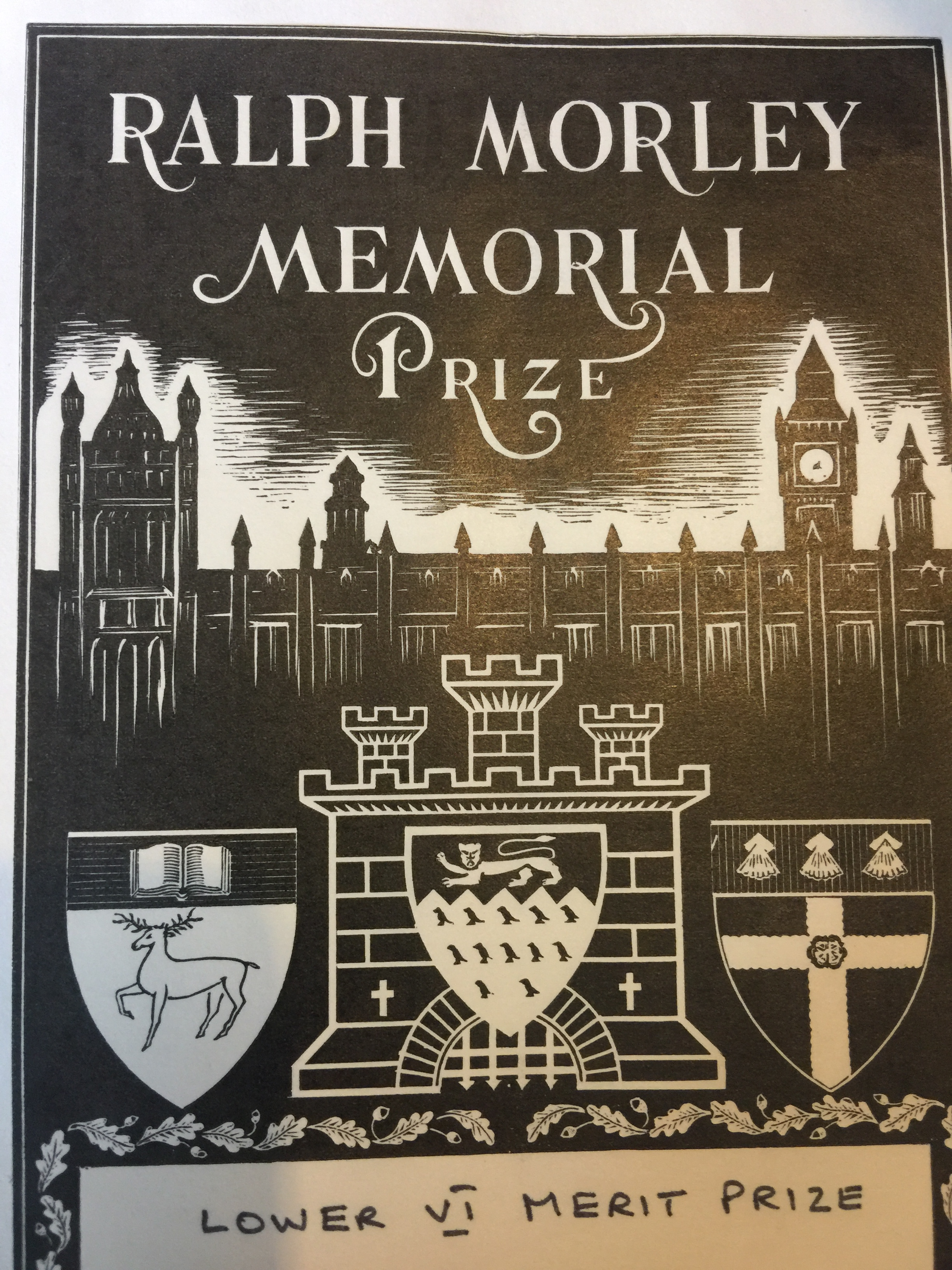
Ralph Morley Memorial Prize. Richard Taunton College. 1978

Parliament of the United Kingdom
Preceded by Edwin King Perkins and Lord Apsley	Member of Parliament for Southampton; 1929–1931; With: Tommy Lewis	Succeeded by William Craven-Ellis and Sir Charles Barrie
Preceded by William Craven-Ellis and Russell Thomas	Member of Parliament for Southampton; 1945–1950; With: Tommy Lewis	Constituency abolished
New constituency	Member of Parliament for Southampton Itchen; 1950–1955	Succeeded by Horace King
Trade union offices
Preceded by Isabel Haswell	President of the National Union of Teachers; 1946–1947	Succeeded by J. W. Lawton
