= William Digby Seymour =

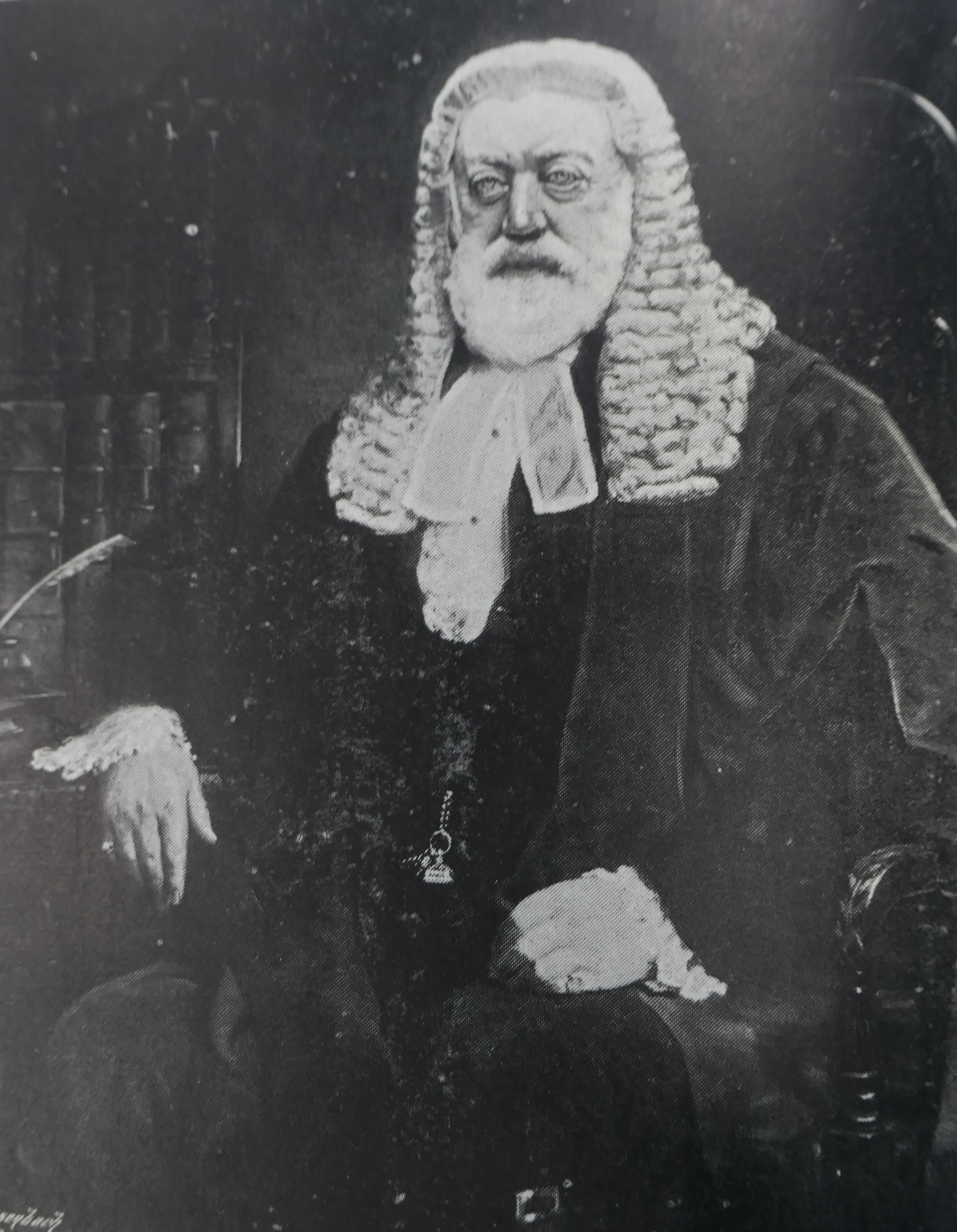

William Digby Seymour (1822–1895) was a British lawyer and poet, and MP for Sunderland and Somerset.

== Biography ==
Seymour, third son of Charles Seymour, vicar of Kilronan, County Roscommon, by Beata, daughter of Fergus Langley of Lich Finn, County Tipperary, was born in Ireland on 22 September 1822. He was educated at Trinity College Dublin, graduating B.A. in 1844 and LL.D. in 1872. He was called to the bar at the Middle Temple on 12 June 1846, and practised on the northern circuit.

By the influence of his father-in-law he was returned to parliament as one of the members for Sunderland in 1852, and his support of the Liberal Party was rewarded with the recordership of Newcastle in December 1854. On returning to his constituency for re-election he was defeated.

In the meantime he had become connected with various commercial undertakings, notably with the Waller Gold-mining Company, of which he was chairman in 1852. His experiences were unfortunate, and in 1858 he had to make an arrangement with his creditors. In 1859 he was called before the benchers of the Middle Temple to answer charges affecting his character as a barrister in connection with some commercial transactions, and on 23 February was censured by the benchers. Seymour disputed the fairness of the decision, but he would not publish the evidence, and he was excluded from the bar mess of the Northern Circuit. He commenced legal proceedings against Mr. Butterworth, the publisher of the Law Magazine, for giving a statement of the case with comments. The trial was heard by Lord-chief-justice Cockburn on 2–3 December 1862, and resulted in a verdict for the plaintiff of 40s.

In May 1859 Seymour was returned for Southampton by securing Conservative support by a pledge not to vote against Derby's government. His failure to observe this promise was commented on by the Morning Herald, and Seymour sought to institute a criminal prosecution of that paper, which was refused by Lord Campbell. Seymour was named a queen's counsel in the county palatine of Lancaster in August 1860, and on 19 February 1861 a queen's counsel for England by Lord Campbell. In the same year he was employed by the government to draw up the Admiralty Reform Act.

His views grew gradually more conservative; he contested unsuccessfully Hull in 1857, Southampton in 1865, Nottingham in 1869 and 1870, Stockton in 1880 and South Shields in 1885. By the influence of his political friends, he became judge of the county-court circuit No. 1, with his chief court at Newcastle-upon-Tyne, in August 1889, and held that appointment at his death, which took place at Tynemouth on 16 March 1895. In February 1894 he was presented with his portrait by C. K. Robinson. He married, on 1 September 1847, Emily, second daughter of Joseph John Wright, solicitor, Sunderland.

== Publications ==
He was author of:

- How to employ Capital in Western Ireland, being Answers to Questions upon the Manufacture of Beet-sugar, Flax, and Chicory in connection with a Land Investment in the West of Ireland, 2nd edit. 1851; with an appendix, a letter from M. Leon, 1851.
- The Merchant Shipping Act, 1854, with summary notes and index, 1855; 2nd edit. 1857.
- The Wail of Montrose; or the Wrongs of Shipping, 1859; 2nd edit. 1859.
- Waste Land Reclamation and Peasant Proprietorship, with suggestions for the Establishment of a Land Bank in Ireland, 1881.
- The Hebrew Psalter: a new metrical translation, 1882.

Parliament of the United Kingdom
Preceded by Sir Hedworth Williamson and George Hudson	Member of Parliament for Sunderland; 1852–1855; With: George Hudson	Succeeded by George Hudson and Henry Fenwick
Preceded by Thomas Weguelin and Brodie Willcox	Member of Parliament for Southampton; 1859–1865; With: Brodie Willcox to 1862; William Rose 1862–1865	Succeeded by Russell Gurney and George Moffatt
