= Richard Butler (c. 1510 – 1568 or later) =

English politician

Richard Butler (c. 1510 – 1568 or later) was an English politician.

Butler was a fruit and cloth merchant in Southampton, made sheriff of the town in 1549–50 and mayor for 1551–52 and 1563–1565. He was elected a member (MP) of the parliament of England for Southampton in April 1554.
