= Robert Richbell =

Member of the Parliament of England

Robert Richbell (c. 1605–1688) was an English merchant and politician who sat in the House of Commons in 1660.

Richbell was the son of Robert Richbell, yeoman, of Overton, Hampshire. He was apprenticed in the City of London as a Skinner in 1622, but did not become a member of the Worshipful Company of Skinners until 1638. For much of his life he divided his business interests between London and Southampton. He was commissioner for assessment for Hampshire in 1652 and again in 1657. In 1658 he became a freeman of Southampton. He was commissioner for assessment for Hampshire from January 1660 until 1663 and a commissioner for militia for Hampshire in March 1660.

In April 1660, Richbell was elected Member of Parliament for Southampton in the Convention Parliament. He was a commissioner for trade from November 1660 to 1668. He was an alderman of London from January to February 1661. He was commissioner for corporations for Hampshire from 1662 to 1663. In 1662 he was mayor of Southampton for a year and during this time he called out the militia to suppress a ‘mutiny’. He owned wine-vaults near the Customs House and a share of a brewery and supplied deal, victuals and rosin to the Portsmouth dockyard. He was commissioner for assessment for Southampton from 1663 to 1669. He accommodated the King at his house during the royal visit to Southampton in 1669. From 1670 to 1671 he was mayor of Southampton again. and in 1671 was allowed to compound for customs frauds relating to the import of wine and tobacco. He was commissioner for assessment for Hampshire and Southampton from 1673 to 1680 and became a freeman of Portsmouth in 1677.

Richbell died at the age of about 82 and was buried at St Lawrence church on 16 July 1688.

Richbell married firstly by 1642, Frances Exton daughter of Edward Exton, merchant of Southampton and had nine sons and four daughters. She died in 1658 and he married secondly Lettice who had one daughter and died in 1661.

Parliament of England
Preceded by Edward Exton	Member of Parliament for Southampton; 1660; With: William Stanley	Succeeded by William Legge; Sir Richard Ford
