= Thomas Matthias Weguelin =

English politician

Thomas Matthias Weguelin (5 May 1809 – 5 April 1885) was an English Liberal Party politician who sat in the House of Commons between 1857 and 1880.

== Life ==
Weguelin was the son of William A. Weguelin of Weymouth Street, Portland Place, London, who was a Russia merchant in London. He had directorships of the London and Liverpool and Globe Assurance Co., the Bahia and San Francisco Railway Co., and the Trust and Loan Co. of Upper Canada. From 1853 to 1855 he was Deputy Governor of the Bank of England and from 1855 to 1857 the Governor. He was a JP for Surrey.

Weguelin was elected as member of parliament (MP) for Southampton at a by-election in February 1857. He was re-elected at the general election in April 1857, but was defeated at the 1859 general election. He was returned to the Commons after a two-year absence at the 1861 by-election for Wolverhampton, and held that seat until he retired from Parliament at the 1880 general election. Weguelin died at the age of 75 on 5 April 1885.

== Family ==
Weguelin married firstly in 1837 Charlotte Poulett-Thomson, daughter of A. H. Poulett-Thomson. She died in 1840 and he married secondly in 1844, Catherine Hammersley, daughter of Charles Hammersley.

Parliament of the United Kingdom
Preceded by Sir Alexander Cockburn; Brodie McGhie Willcox	Member of Parliament for Southampton; 1857–1859; With: Brodie McGhie Willcox	Succeeded by William Digby Seymour; Brodie McGhie Willcox
Preceded by Sir Richard Bethell; Charles Pelham Villiers	Member of Parliament for Wolverhampton; 1861–1880; With: Charles Pelham Villiers	Succeeded by Henry Fowler; Charles Pelham Villiers
