= James Brande =

16th-century English politician

James Brande or Brende (by 1532 – 1582 or later), was an English politician.

He was a member (MP) of the parliament of England for Old Sarum in March 1553 and for Southampton in April 1554, November 1554, 1555, 1558 and 1563.
