= William Craven-Ellis =

British politician (1880–1959)

William Craven Ellis in 1928

William Craven Craven-Ellis (1880 – 17 December 1959), born William Craven Ellis, was a Conservative Party politician in the United Kingdom.

Ellis was educated at Manchester Grammar School, and became a senior partner of Ellis & Sons, Valuers and Surveyors. He assumed the name Craven-Ellis by deed poll in 1931.

In both the 1923 and 1929 general elections, he unsuccessfully contested the safe Labour-held seat of Barnsley as a Conservative. He was elected as a National member of parliament (MP) for Southampton in the 1931 general election, and held the seat until his defeat in the 1945 general election. Craven-Ellis had been selected as the Conservative candidate prior to the 1931 election but contested it as a National. The Times Guide to the House of Commons 1935, however, treats him as a Conservative. In the House of Commons, he was chair of the Parliamentary Monetary Committee from 1934 to 1944.

== Notes ==
Parliament of the United Kingdom
Preceded by Ralph Morley and Tommy Lewis	Member of Parliament for Southampton; 1931–1945; With: Sir Charles Barrie, to 1940; Sir John Reith; Russell Thomas, 1940–1945	Succeeded by Ralph Morley and Tommy Lewis
