= November 1940 Southampton by-election =

UK parliamentary by-election

The 1940 Southampton by-election was held on 27 November 1940. The by-election was held due to the elevation to the peerage of the incumbent National MP, Sir John Reith. It was won by the Liberal National candidate Russell Thomas. This was the last uncontested Parliamentary election to date where it resulted in a gain for the winning party.

By-election, November 1940: Southampton
Party	Candidate	Votes	%	±%
Liberal National	Russell Thomas	Unopposed		
Liberal National gain from National				
