= Thomas Lambert (died 1621) =

English politician

Thomas Lambert (c. 1558 – 7 April 1621), of Hazeley in Hampshire, was an English politician.

Lambert was a Member of Parliament for Southampton in 1601.
