= John Bigard =

John Bigard (died 1397/8), of Lymington and Southampton, Hampshire, was an English Member of Parliament (MP).

He was a Member of the Parliament of England for Southampton in September 1388.
