= Tommy Lewis (trade unionist) =

British trade unionist, local councillor and Labour Member of Parliament

Thomas Lewis
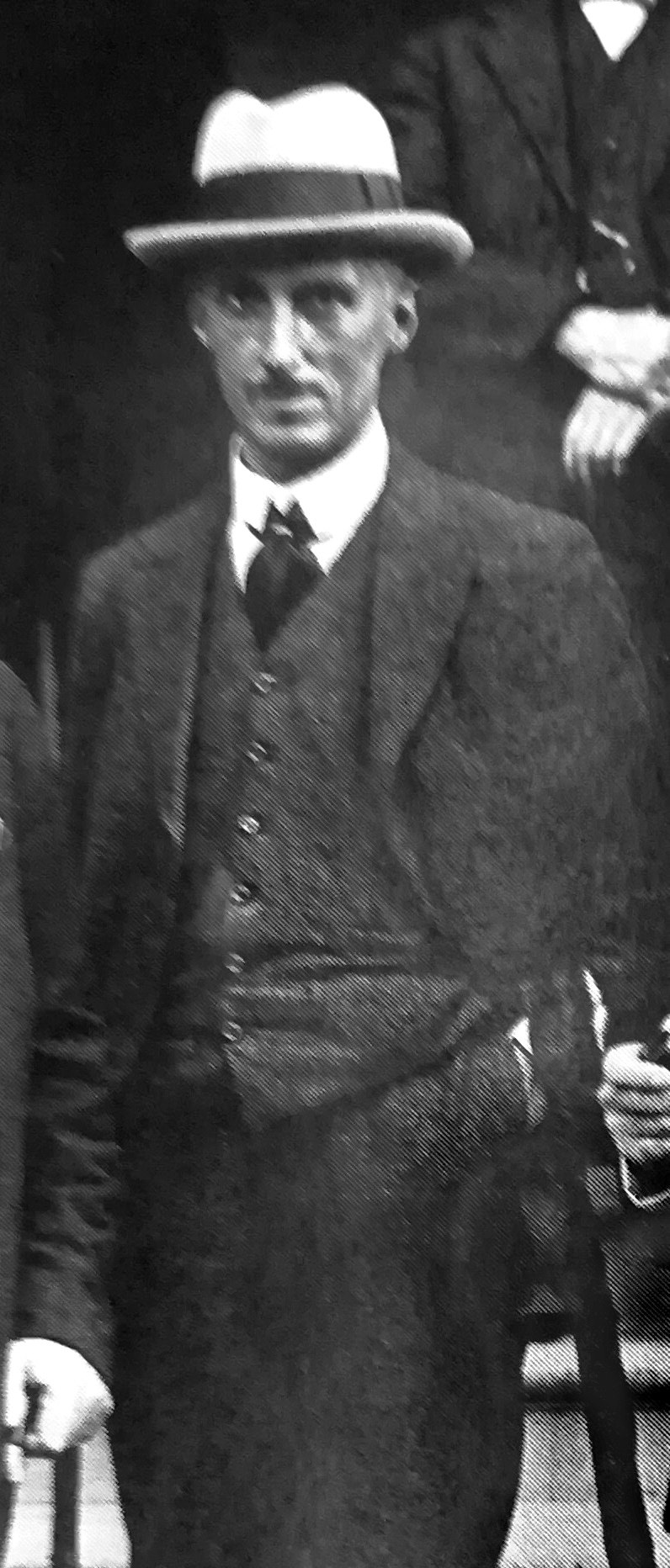
- Lewis at the 1922 Trades Union Congress

Member of Parliament for Southampton
- In office 30 May 1929 – 27 October 1931 Serving with Ralph Morley
- Preceded by: Edwin King Perkins and Lord Apsley
- Succeeded by: William Craven-Ellis and Sir Charles Coupar Barrie
- In office 5 July 1945 – 23 February 1950 Serving with Ralph Morley
- Preceded by: William Craven-Ellis and William Stanley Russell Thomas
- Succeeded by: Constituency abolished

Personal details
- Born: 12 December 1873 St Mary's, Southampton
- Died: 28 February 1962 (age 89)
- Party: Labour Party (UK)

Thomas Lewis (12 December 1873 – 28 February 1962) was a British trade unionist, local councillor and Labour Member of Parliament (MP).

== Biography ==
Lewis was born in the St. Mary's area of Southampton, the son of dock labourer from Jersey in the Channel Islands. He began work as a watchmaker at the age of 11. In the late 1880s, he became involved with the Social Democratic Federation and went on to serve for nine years on the Federation's National Executive. In 1901, following the establishment of the Labour Party the previous year, Lewis was elected as Southampton's first Labour councillor. He served on the Borough council until 1961, except for two short breaks totalling 18 months

Lewis was selected by Southampton Trades Council to contest the Southampton constituency in the January 1910 General Election but was forced to withdraw through lack of funds. He stood as a candidate at the 1918, 1922, 1923 and 1924 elections, before finally being elected at 1929 general election, along with Ralph Morley, as Southampton's first Labour MPs. He lost the seat at the 1931 general election, having been among the Labour MPs who refused to follow the Prime Minister and Labour Party Leader Ramsay MacDonald into a coalition with the Conservatives to form the National Government. He returned to the House of Commons at the age of 72 in the Labour landslide at the 1945 general election, but retired from national politics when the two-seat Southampton constituency was divided at the 1950 general election.

Lewis played a prominent, if sometimes controversial, role in the development of trade unionism in Southampton. He helped to form branches of the Dockers' Union, the Ship's Stewards' Union, the Shop Assistants' Union and the National Sailors' and Firemen's Union. In 1911 he took part in a revolt of the local Seamen's Union branch against the national officials, which led to formation of a new union, the British Seafarers' Union. Lewis became the honorary president of the new union and, later, of its successor, the Amalgamated Marine Workers' Union. He was also president of the Hearts of Oak Benefit Society for many years.

== Thomas Lewis Way ==
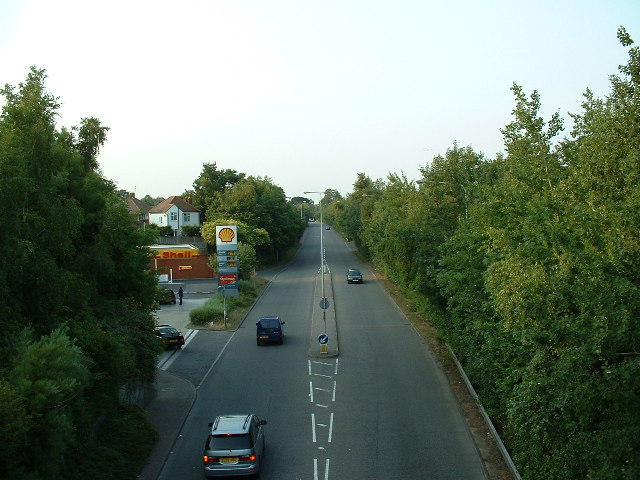
Thomas Lewis Way

In 1989, the A335 Portswood bypass was opened, a road which followed the course of what was intended to be the M272 motorway, a spur of the M27 from into Southampton (along similar lines to the M271 motorway). Instead the bypass was constructed as a single carriageway road, and was named Thomas Lewis Way after Tommy Lewis.

== See also ==
- British Seafarers' Union

Parliament of the United Kingdom
Preceded by Edwin King Perkins and Lord Apsley	Member of Parliament for Southampton; 1929–1931; With: Ralph Morley	Succeeded by William Craven-Ellis and Sir Charles Barrie
Preceded by William Craven-Ellis and Russell Thomas	Member of Parliament for Southampton; 1945–1950; With: Ralph Morley	Constituency abolished
