= John Scarlet (footballer) =

Indonesian footballer

Personal information
- Full name: John Scarlet
- Date of birth: 18 August 1978
- Place of birth: Merauke, Papua, Indonesia
- Date of death: 18 October 2010 (aged 32)
- Place of death: Merauke, Papua, Indonesia
- Height: 1.75 m (5 ft 9 in)
- Position: Defender

Senior career*
Years	Team	Apps	(Gls)
2000–2004	Persipura Jayapura		
2005–2006	Deltras Sidoarjo		
2007–2009	Persela Lamongan		
2009–2010	Persipura Jayapura	6	(0)
- * Club domestic league appearances and goals as of 9 December 2009

John Scarlet (18 August 1978 – 18 October 2010) was an Indonesian footballer who played as a defender for Liga Indonesia club Persipura Jayapura.

He was born in Merauke, Papua. He died in Merauke in 2010.
