= William Maple =

William Maple (died c.1399), of Southampton, was an English Member of Parliament (MP).

He was a Member of the Parliament of England for Southampton in February 1388, January 1390, 1391 and 1393. He was Mayor of Southampton 1386–9, 1390–1, and 1396–7.
