= Thomas Marlborough =

English Member of Parliament

Thomas Marlborough (fl. 1395–1426), of Southampton, was an English Member of Parliament (MP).

He was elected to the Parliament of England for Southampton in 1395, 1402, 1411, April 1414, November 1414, 1415, March 1416, May 1421, 1422, 1423 and 1426.
