= Brodie McGhie Willcox =

British politician (1786–1862)

Brodie McGhie Willcox (1786–1862) was a Liberal Party Member of Parliament (MP) and the co-founder of the Peninsular & Oriental Steam Navigation Company, one of the United Kingdom's largest shipping businesses.

== Early life ==
Brodie was born to English and Belgian parents. A maternal uncle was Brodie August McGhie, a shipwowner and shipbuilder in London whom he was named after. He spent his childhood in Newcastle upon Tyne before moving to London in the early 1800s.

== Career ==
On moving to London he established himself as a shipbroker and with interests in marine insurance and commissioning ships, believed to have occurred with the support of his uncle. In 1812, he married the daughter of a Belgian merchant working in London. While working as a shipbroker, Brodie Willcox recruited Arthur Anderson initially as a clerk in 1815. By 1822 he took on Anderson as a partner to operate a shipping business sailing from Cornwall and around the Iberian Peninsula, together with Captain Richard Bourne and by 1835 were well established operating as the Peninsular Steam Navigation Company.

In 1837, Brodie Willcox and Arthur Anderson established the Peninsular & Oriental Steam Navigation Company. In 1836, the company had six ships, operating between the UK, Portugal and Spain. The company would continue to grow and acquire more ships in the mid-19th century. The company was incorporated by royal charter in 1840 to deliver mail and Brodie Willcox served as the first Managing Director of the business which by the 1860s was the owner of the largest steamship fleet in the World.

In the 1847 general election Brodie Willcox was elected as a Member of Parliament (MP) for Southampton. He remained an MP for the rest of his life.

He died in Roydon near Portsmouth in 1862 in an accident at his home. While supervising the lopping of some large trees on his property, a heavy branch snapped and fell from height, hitting his head. Local doctors attended the house but he was diagnosed with a fractured skull and died a day later on 6 November 1862. He is buried on the western side of Highgate Cemetery.

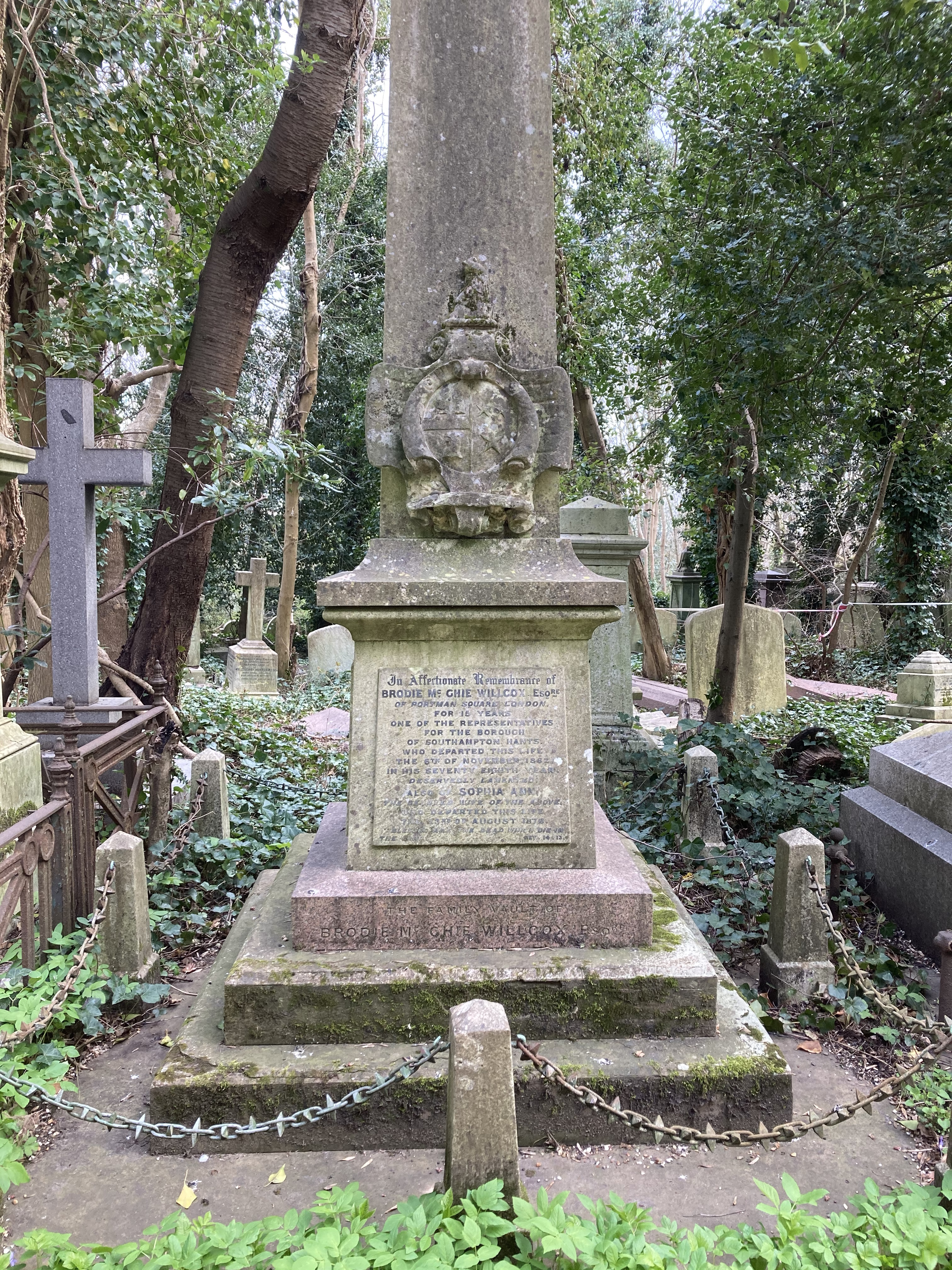
Family grave of Brodie McGhie Willcox in Highgate Cemetery

== Family ==
He was married to Sophia Ann Willcox (née van der Gucht).

Parliament of the United Kingdom
Preceded by George Hope; Humphrey St John Mildmay	Member of Parliament for Southampton; 1847–1862; With: Sir Alexander Cockburn to 1857; Thomas Weguelin 1857–1859; William Seymour from 1859	Succeeded by William Rose; William Seymour
