= William Dudley Ward =

English sportsman and politician

The Right Honourable William Dudley Ward PC

Treasurer of the Household
- In office 20 December 1909 – 21 February 1912
- Monarch: George V
- Prime Minister: H. H. Asquith
- Preceded by: Sir Edward Strachey
- Succeeded by: Frederick Guest

Vice-Chamberlain of the Household
- In office 9 December 1917 – 19 October 1922
- Monarch: George V
- Prime Minister: David Lloyd George
- Preceded by: Cecil Beck
- Succeeded by: Douglas Hacking

Personal details
- Born: 14 October 1877 London, England
- Died: 11 November 1946 (aged 69) Calgary, Alberta, Canada
- Party: Liberal
- Spouse: Winifred May "Freda" Birkin (m. 1913; div. 1931)
- Children: 2, including Penelope Dudley-Ward
- Education: Trinity College, Cambridge

Olympic medal record

Sailing

Representing Great Britain

Olympic Games
Bronze medal – third place	1908 London	8 Metre

William Dudley Ward PC (14 October 1877 – 11 November 1946) was an English sportsman and Liberal Party politician.

== Early life ==
Dudley Ward was born in London, the son of William Humble Dudley Ward and the great-grandson of William Humble Ward, 10th Baron Ward. His mother was the Hon. Eugenie Violet Adele Brett, daughter of William Brett, 1st Viscount Esher.

He was educated at Eton and Trinity College, Cambridge. At Cambridge, he was secretary of the Pitt Club.

== Career ==
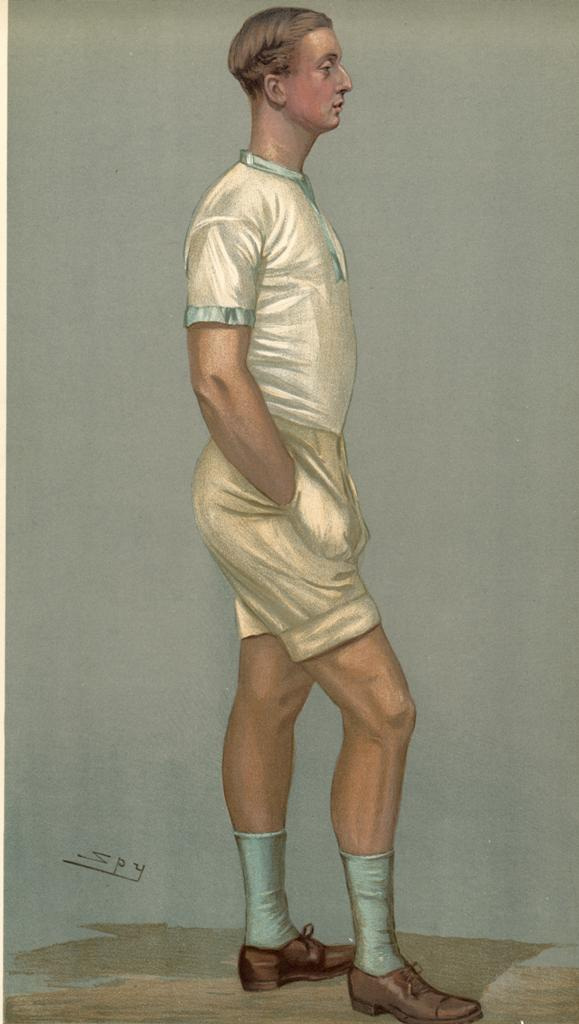
William Dudley Ward as depicted by "Spy" (Leslie Ward) in Vanity Fair, 29 March 1900.

Dudley Ward rowed for Cambridge in the Boat Race in 1897 when Oxford won. As President of Cambridge University Boat Club (CUBC), he rowed in the winning Cambridge crews in the 1899 and 1900 races.

At Henley Royal Regatta, he was runner-up in Silver Goblets (pairs' event) in 1900 with Raymond Etherington-Smith. His crew won the Stewards' Challenge Cup in 1901. In 1902, he won the Grand Challenge Cup, the Stewards' Challenge Cup again, and the Silver Goblets partnering Claude Taylor. In 1903 his crew won the Stewards' and Grand again.

In the 1908 Summer Olympics, Dudley Ward was a crew member of the British boat Sorais, which won the bronze medal in the 8-metre class.

=== Political career ===
Dudley Ward was returned to Parliament for Southampton in 1906, a seat he held until 1922, and served under H. H. Asquith as Treasurer of the Household from 1909 to 1912. During World War I he was a Lieutenant Commander in the Royal Navy Volunteer Reserve, though this may have been a cover for his counter-espionage work for Admiral Sir William Reginald Hall, Director of Naval Intelligence. He served under David Lloyd George as Vice-Chamberlain of the Household from 1917 to 1922. In 1922 he was admitted to the Privy Council.

=== Later life ===
After retiring from politics, he divided his time between England and Canada, where he was custodian of Edward, Prince of Wales's Alberta properties, primarily the E.P. Ranch, the royal's cattle ranch near Pekisko west of Calgary. An old sandstone building on Stephen Avenue where he had his offices is known as the Glanville/Ward Block.

== Personal life ==
Dudley Ward reportedly "had a liking for the fleshpots and was known, on occasions, to turn up for training still dressed in white tie and tails." He married Winifred May "Freda" Birkin (better known under her married name of Freda Dudley Ward), daughter of Col. Charles Wilfred Birkin, in 1913. She was a socialite and became a mistress of Edward, Prince of Wales. Before the couple divorced in 1931, they were the parents of two daughters:

- Penelope Ann Rachel Dudley Ward (1914–1982), a leading actress in the 1930s and 1940s; she married Anthony Pelissier in 1939. After their divorce in 1944, she married film director Sir Carol Reed in 1948.
- Claire Angela Louise Dudley Ward (1916–1999), who married the commando leader Maj.-Gen. Sir Robert Laycock, in 1935.

Dudley Ward died in Calgary, Alberta in November 1946, aged sixty-nine, after an operation, and is buried in the city's Union Cemetery. Freda remarried in 1937 to Pedro Monés, Marquess of Casa Maury, and died in March 1983, aged eighty-eight.

=== Descendants ===
Through his elder daughter Penelope, he was a grandfather to Max Reed (b. 1948), and to Clare Pelissier (1942–2012), an actress who went by the name Tracy Reed and married fellow actor Edward Fox.

Through his younger daughter Claire, he was a grandfather to Joseph William Peter Laycock (1938–1980), who married actress Lucy Fleming (niece of writer Ian Fleming).

== See also ==
- List of Cambridge University Boat Race crews

Parliament of the United Kingdom
Preceded by Sir John Simeon; Tankerville Chamberlayne	Member of Parliament for Southampton; 1906–1922; With: Sir Ivor Philipps	Succeeded by Edwin King Perkins; Lord Apsley
Political offices
Preceded by Sir Edward Strachey	Treasurer of the Household; 1909–1912	Succeeded by Frederick Guest
Preceded by Cecil Beck	Vice-Chamberlain of the Household; 1917–1922	Succeeded by Douglas Hacking
