= Richard Goddard (died 1596) =

English politician

Richard Goddard (died 1596) was an English politician.

He was a member (MP) of the parliament of England for Southampton in 1589.
