= John Storey Penleaze =

British politician

John Storey Penleaze (died 12 April 1855) was a British politician.

Penleaze lived at Bossington House near Stockbridge, and Beech Cottage in Southampton. At the 1831 UK general election, he stood in Southampton for the Whigs, winning a seat. He was defeated at the 1832 UK general election, but was seated on petition. He stood down at the 1835 UK general election.
