= John Scarlet (MP) =

John Scarlet (fl. 1388), of Southampton, was an English Member of Parliament (MP).

He was a Member of the Parliament of England for Southampton in February 1388.
