= Thomas Appleby (MP) =

English Member of Parliament (died 1413)

Thomas Appleby (died 1413), of Southampton, was an English Member of Parliament (MP).

He was a Member of the Parliament of England for Southampton in October 1383, January 1390, 1391, 1393, 1394, 1395 and January 1397.
