= Walter Lange =

English politician (died 1410)

Walter Lange (died 1410), of Southampton, was an English Member of Parliament (MP).

He was a Member of the Parliament of England for Southampton in September 1397 and 1406. He was Mayor of Southampton 1393–4, and 1407–8.
