= Roger Mascall =

Roger Mascall (died c. 1390), of Southampton, was an English Member of Parliament (MP).

He was a Member of the Parliament of England for Southampton in 1386.
