= Abel Rous Dottin =

British Army officer and politician

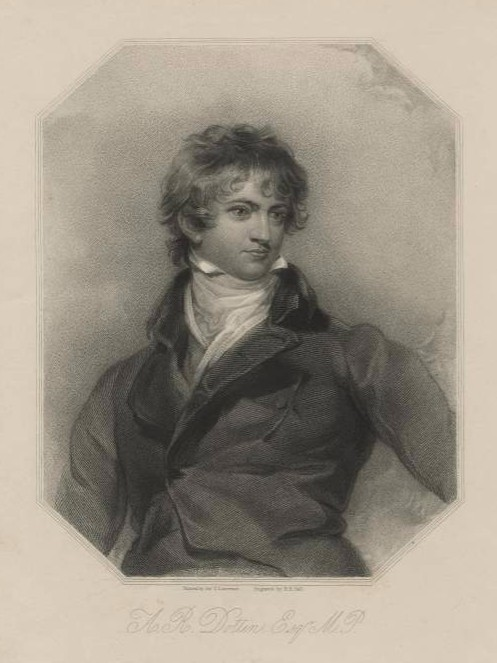
An illustration of Dottin after Thomas Lawrence

Abel Rous Dottin (c. 1768 – 17 June 1852) was a British Army officer and Tory politician.

== Early life ==
Dottin was born in St George Hanover Square, the son of Abel Dottin, of Granada Hall, Barbados, who was High Sheriff of Oxfordshire in 1764, and his wife Sarah Rous of Barbados. On his father's death in 1784, he inherited the Scotland plantation in Barbados. He matriculated at The Queen's College, Oxford in 1786, at age 17.

== Military career ==
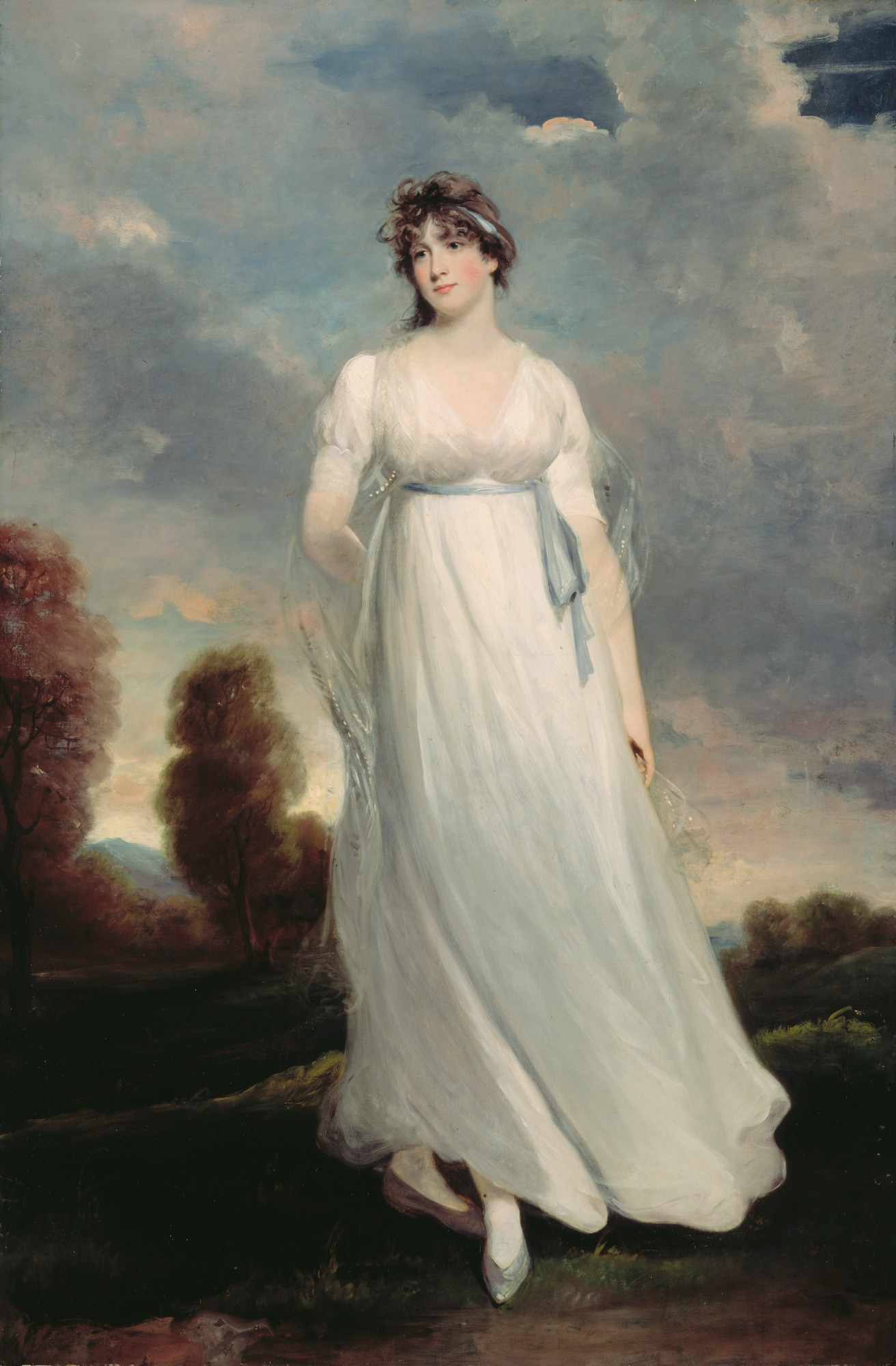
Dorothy Dottin, portrait by John Hoppner

Dottin became a cornet in the 2nd Life Guards in 1791, and was promoted to captain in 1794. In 1795, he was cited in the divorce case of William Townshend Mullins and his second wife, Frances.

== In politics ==
In 1818, Dottin, a Tory, entered Parliament for the rotten borough of Gatton. He failed to be elected in 1820 at Southampton, despite heavy expenditure. In 1826 he was returned there unopposed, and again in 1830. In 1831, he did not stand, for health reasons. Re-elected in 1835, in a contested election, he remained in Parliament until he retired in 1841.

== Railway director ==
Dottin was one of the founders of the Southampton and London Railway and Dock Company, in 1831, with George Walter, and Robert Johnston, from Jamaica and a relation. The company failed. George Thomas Landmann in October 1831 brought Walter into planning for the London and Greenwich Railway, and an initial meeting was held in Dottin's house in Argyle Street, London. He was chairman of the company when it opened in 1836. In July 1837, Dottin and Walter resigned as directors.

Later, Dottin was a director of the London and South Western Railway.

== Later life ==
Dottin received compensation for the Coverley estate in Barbados, under the Slave Compensation Act 1837; he had disposed of the Scotland plantation, also called Greenland(s), by 1823, when it was owned by John Rycroft Best. He died in Argyle Street, London on 17 June 1852.

== Family ==
Abel Rous Dottin married in 1798, Dorothy, daughter of Robert Burnett Jones of Barbados. She died on 30 October 1853. By this marriage Dottin was connected to James Everard Arundell, 9th Baron Arundell of Wardour and David Richard Morier, his brothers-in-law. His brother Samuel Rous Dottin, also an army officer, died c. 1797.
