= Jukes =

Jukes is a surname. Notable people with the surname include:

- Andrew Jukes (theologian) (1815–1901), English theologian
- Andrew Jukes (missionary) (1847–1931), Anglican missionary
- Betty Jukes (1910–2006), British sculptor
- Bill Jukes (c. 1883–1939), English rugby league footballer who played in the 1900s and 1910s
- Francis Jukes (1745–1812), engraver and publisher
- David Jukes (born 1956), English cricketer
- Hamilton Jukes (1895–1951), British ice hockey player who competed in the 1924 Winter Olympics
- John Peter Jukes (1923–2011), English Prelate of the Roman Catholic Church
- Joseph Beete Jukes (1811–1869), British geologist
- Keith Jukes (1954–2013), Dean of Ripon
- Matt Jukes, British police officer
- Matthew Jukes, British journalist
- Mavis Jukes (born 1947), American author
- Norman Jukes (born 1932), English professional footballer
- Peter Jukes (born 1960), British author and screenwriter
- Reginald Jukes, rugby league footballer who played in the 1930s and 1940s
- Richard Jukes (1804–1867), Primitive Methodist Minister and hymn writer
- Thomas H. Jukes (1906–1999), British-American biologist
- The Jukes family, a New York hill family that was the subject of Eugenics studies
- Alfred John Jukes-Browne (1851–1914), British invertebrate paleontologist
- Sylvia Jukes Morris (1935–2020), British biographer

== See also ==
- Mount Jukes (disambiguation)
- Juke (disambiguation)
- Southside Johnny and the Asbury Jukes
