= Alfred Gurney =

English cleric and writer (1843–1898)

Alfred Gurney (1843 – 1898) was an English cleric and writer.

== Early life ==
The second son of John Hampden Gurney, he was a brother of Edmund Gurney the psychic researcher. His father having died in 1862, the five children were brought up by Russell and Emelia Gurney, their uncle and aunt.

Gurney was educated at Exeter College, Oxford, matriculating there in 1862, and graduating B.A. in 1866, M.A. in 1869. He entered the Inner Temple in 1867.

== Curate ==
Changing career, Gurney went into the church. Richard William Randall at All Saints, Clifton offered him a chance 1872 to be ordained and become his curate. This was a false start, because Charles Ellicott as bishop refused to ordain Gurney, citing Randall's ritualism. Gurney then became curate to Arthur Wagner; in 1877 he was assistant curate at St Bartholomew's Church, Brighton. At this period of his life he met Ellen Beardsley, mother of Aubrey Beardsley; whom he later encouraged as an artist.

== Vicar of Pimlico ==
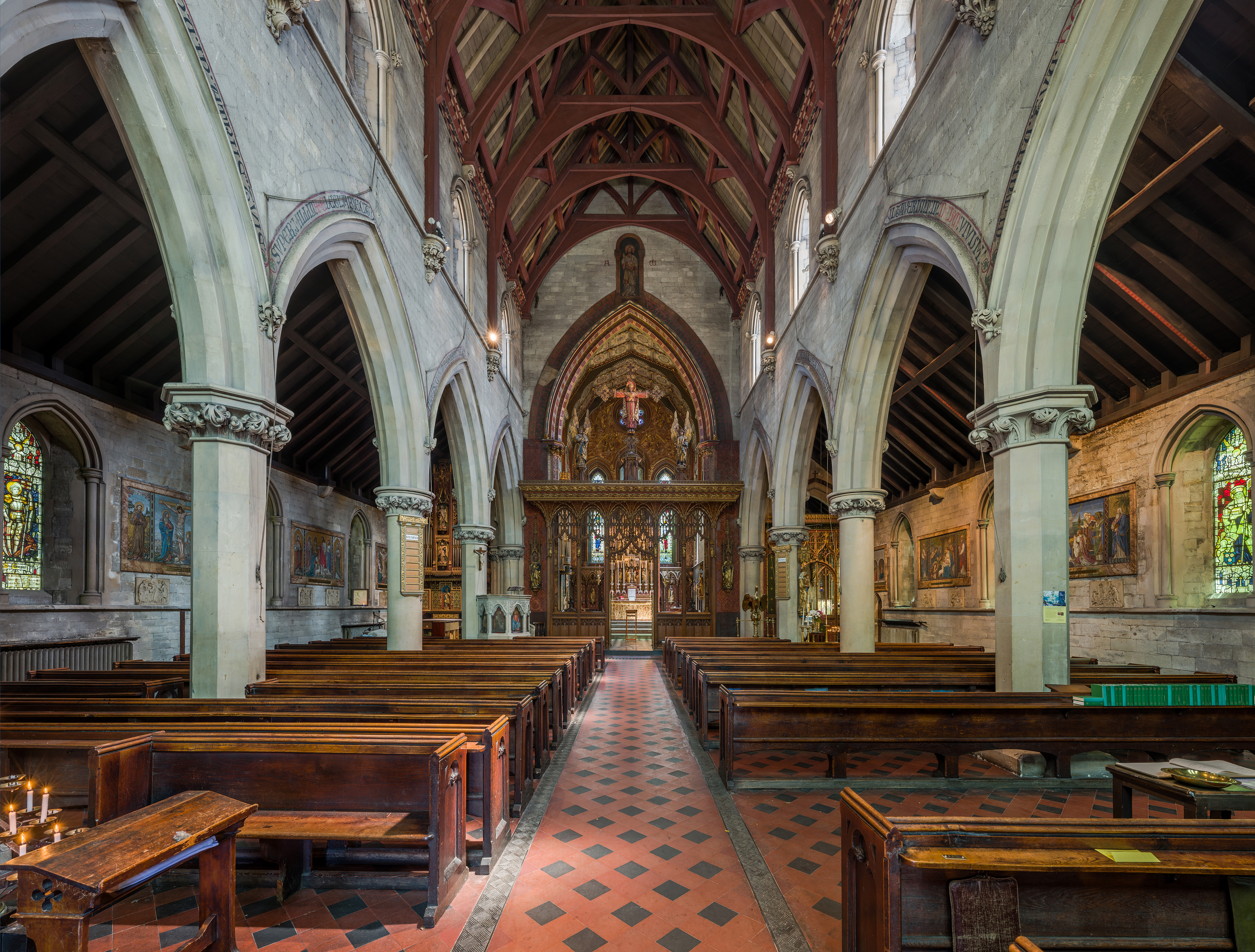
St Barnabas Church interior, Pimlico, London

Gurney was from 1879 vicar of St Barnabas, Pimlico, in London—an 1850 church associated with the Oxford Movement—and became known for religious verse. He formed what has been called a "Catholic-minded community" around the church.

Bringing in church music, Gurney formed a choir under Thomas Helmore. George Herbert Palmer was organist. Services used incense.

During the 1890s Gurney had the original decoration of St Barnabas, by Thomas Cundy, elaborated by George Frederick Bodley. Glass by Charles Kempe and Ninian Comper was introduced, replacing that by William Wailes.

== Interests and connections ==
From 1882, Gurney was corresponding with Christina Rossetti. She became his friend and occasional visitor. He gave a lecture on her late brother Dante Gabriel Rossetti in 1883 at Somerville College, Oxford, and wrote a work of criticism, A Dream of Fair Women.

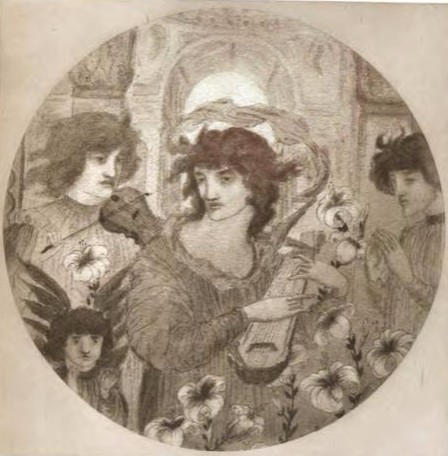
Adoramus Te, 1892 drawing by Aubrey Beardsley, owned by Alfred Gurney. Beardsley was commissiones to make Christmas cards for Gurney, in the style of Edward Burne-Jones.

Gurney was a Wagnerian, who wrote on Parsifal. In 1889, he travelled to Bayreuth to hear it performed, with his aunt Emilia Russell Gurney. She was a prominent member of the "Cowper-Temple circle", a loose evangelical and ecumenical Christian group around William Cowper-Temple, 1st Baron Mount Temple and Georgiana Cowper-Temple, Lady Mount Temple, attending their "Broadlands conferences" from 1874 to 1888; and also a founder of the Kensington Society. Alfred Gurney attended the 1876 Broadlands conference. He has also been considered a follower of Andrew Jukes.

In 1891, Gurney encouraged the young, ailing Aubrey Beardsley, who was now working in London, to go into illustration; he was then supported by friends such as Aymer Vallance. In 1897 Gurney was the dedicatee of Hymns and Carols for Christmas-tide by George Ratcliffe Woodward.

== Death ==
Gurney died in Roehampton, in 1898.

== Works ==
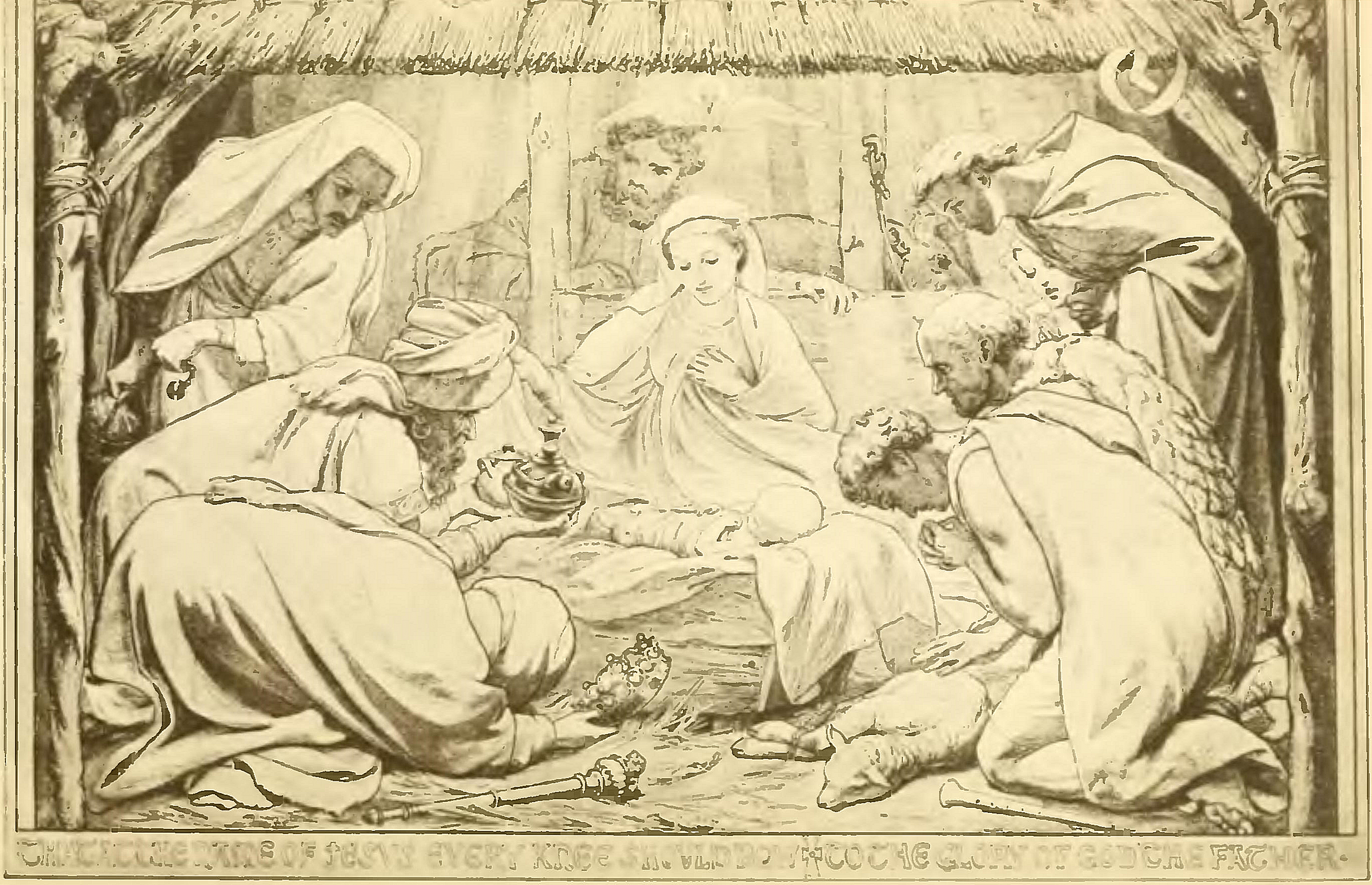
Illustration from A Christmas Faggot (1884)

- Verses (1870)
- The Vision of the Eucharist, and other poems (1882)
- A Dream of Fair Women, a Study of some Pictures by Dante Gabriel Rossetti (1883).
- A Christmas Faggot (1884)
- Parsifal: A Festival Play by Richard Wagner: a Study (1888)
- Our Catholic Inheritance in the Larger Hope: An Essay (1888)
- Voices from the Holy Sepulchre and other poems (1889)
- George Chapman. A Narrative of a Devoted Life (1893), editor
- Day-dreams (1896)
- Love's Fruition (1897)
- Amor Ordinatus. Essays and Addresses (1905)

As a critic, Gurney was noted for religious interpretation of works that went further than the authors' intentions.

== Family ==
In 1866, Gurney married Alice Blanche Gibbs, daughter of William Gibbs, and they had two sons, Cyril, and William Hampden. Alice died in 1871.
