= Andrew Jukes =

Andrew Jukes may refer to:

- Andrew Jukes (missionary) (1847–1931), Anglican missionary and doctor
- Andrew Jukes (theologian) (1815–1901)
- Andrew Jukes (surgeon) (1774–1821), surgeon of the East India Company
- Andrew Henry Jukes, political candidate for Calgary West
