= Emelia Russell Gurney =

English campaigner for women's higher education

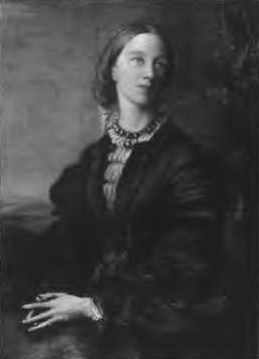
Emelia Russell Gurney, engraving after 1866 portrait by G. F. Watts

Emelia Russell Gurney (1823–1896) was an English activist, patron and benefactor. After her marriage she was generally known as Mrs. Russell Gurney.

== Life ==
She was born Emelia Batten, daughter of the Rev. Samuel Ellis Batten (1792–1830), master at Harrow School, and Caroline Venn, daughter of John Venn. A friend of the children of John William Cunningham, and close to James Fitzjames Stephen, she was present in March 1851 when Stephen met Mary Richenda Cunningham, his future wife, for the second time, and fell in love. She herself married Russell Gurney in 1852. He was from the London Baptist family of parliamentary shorthand writers, rather than the Norwich Quaker banking Gurney family of Earlham Hall.

The Gurneys lived in London at 8 Kensington Palace Gardens, from around 1854. She was a founder of the Kensington Society of 1865–8, a group of feminists, reformers and suffragists.

A committee was set up after Elizabeth Blackwell lectured on medical training for women, in 1859, and Gurney belonged to it. She helped Elizabeth Garrett, the medical pioneer, with an introduction to William Hawes (1805–1885) (as a grandson of William Hawes (1736–1808) he was related to Russell Gurney); and the Gurneys supported the dispensary Garrett set up in 1866. Emelia confided to Elizabeth Garrett her ambivalence about the use of "feminine arts" to get ahead.

In 1865 she travelled with her husband to Jamaica, a commissioner investigating the handling of the Morant Bay rebellion; and wrote of conditions there, in the form of a journal addressed to her mother.

In December 1867 Gurney was one of the initial members of Emily Davies's executive committee, that raised funds for Girton College. With Maria Georgina Grey and Emily Shirreff she founded The Girls' Public Day School Company. Before her husband died, in 1878, she was reticent about her activist views.

== Legacy ==
Gurney commissioned murals for the Chapel of the Ascension, Hyde Park Place, Bayswater, London. They were designed by Herbert Percy Horne, and executed by Frederic Shields. She funded the building of the red brick chapel, which replaced the chapel of St George's Fields, Westminster, a burial ground. It was damaged in World War II and demolished in 1952.

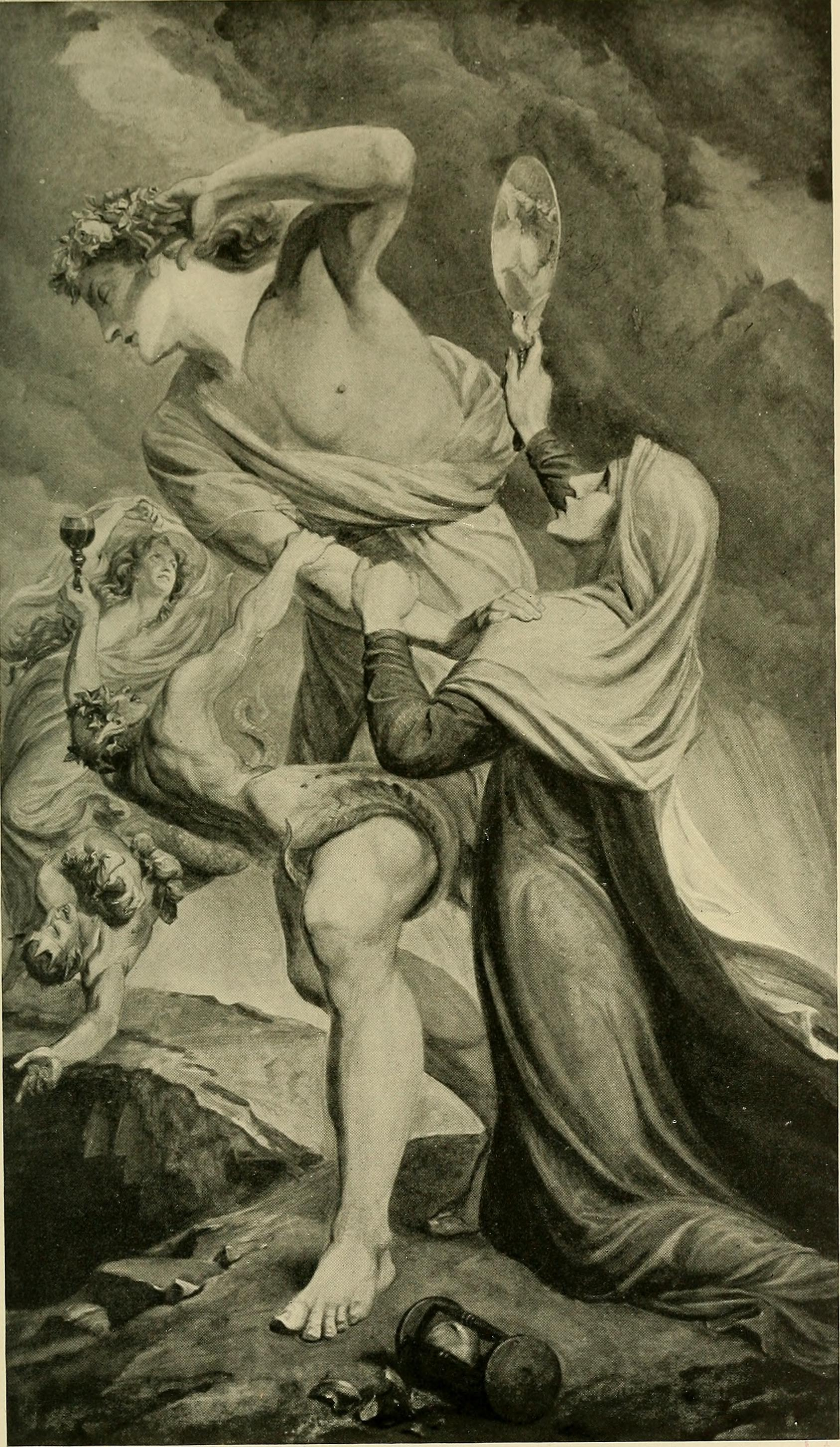
Man Repels the Appeal of Conscience, Ascension Chapel mural

Octavia Hill had been a friend in early life: but the two women then lost touch. Gurney left Hill a block of buildings in Westbourne. These Hill combined with properties in Horace Street, to form a housing trust that has endured. When Hill in 1898 was formally presented with a portrait, she made a speech of thanks in which she mentioned particular supporters who were dead: Emelia Gurney with Sydney John Cockerell, F. D. Maurice, Jane Senior and William Shaen.

== Associations ==
The Gurneys knew Francis Galton, through his wife Louisa Jane (née Butler). It was at their house that Gerard Manley Hopkins met Christina Rossetti and William Holman Hunt. The Gurneys bought works by Dante Gabriel Rossetti, and Emelia was a supporter of Emily Ford. She had been taken to Rossetti's studio in 1862 by Ellen Heaton, a friend.

While on good terms with her mother, who had brought her up, Gurney considered that her evangelical background had been strict. A prominent member of the "Cowper-Temple" or Mount Temple religious circle, a loose evangelical and ecumenical Christian group around William Cowper-Temple, 1st Baron Mount Temple and his wife Georgina, she attended their "Broadlands conferences" from 1874 to 1888. Georgina was a particular friend.

Emelia visited the lay theologian Thomas Erskine of Linlathen many times, both before and after her marriage. She corresponded with Andrew Jukes, Hannah Whitall Smith and Victoria, Lady Welby. Staying with Lady Welby in 1883, she met Joseph Henry Shorthouse and his wife Sarah, who became lifelong friends. Julia Wedgwood was a close friend.

The Gurneys hosted at their house meetings of the Ladies' Sanitary Association, a health organisation founded in 1857 by Mathias Roth. Its supporters were an eclectic mixture: feminists, politicians' wives, wives of medical men. Emelia organised a series of lectures given by the writer and theologian George MacDonald, in 1858, and the first of these was in the Gurneys' home.

Dante's Pilgrim's Progress

== Works ==
- Dante's Pilgrim's Progress (1897), dedicated to Robert Bickersteth, a lecturer on Dante.
- The Chapel of the Ascension: a descriptive handbook (1897), published under the name of Frederic Shields, is attributed to Gurney.

== Family ==
The Gurneys had no children of their own; they fostered the five children of John Hampden Gurney, Russell's brother, from 1862 to 1865. They included the brothers Frederick, Alfred and Edmund.
