= Juke =

Juke may refer to:

- Juke (football move), a deceptive move in American football
- "Juke" (instrumental), a harmonica instrumental recorded by Little Walter Jacobs
- Juke joint, an informal establishment featuring blues music, dancing, and alcoholic drinks
- Juke Magazine (1975–1992), an Australian national music industry newspaper
- Nissan Juke, a car
- Samsung Juke, a mobile phone created by Samsung

== People ==
- Guy Juke (born 1951), a.k.a. De White, American graphic artist
- Juke Boy Bonner (1932–1978), the American blues singer, Weldon H. Philip Bonner
- Jukes family, a New York hill family studied in 19th- and early-20th-century euthenics research

== See also ==
- Juke, a boombox cartoon character in series The Amazing World of Gumball
- Juke music (disambiguation)
- Jukes, a surname
- Jukebox, a partially automated music-playing device that plays songs selected from self-contained media
- Juking, a sexualized form of dancing, associated with juke house
