= Dorothea Beale =

English suffragist and college principal (1831–1906)

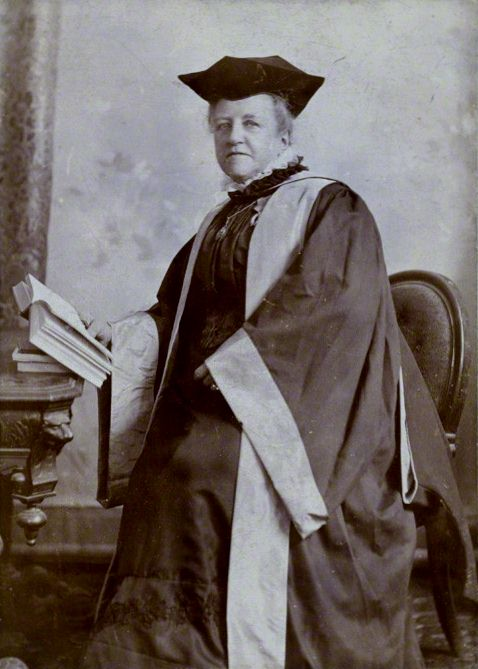
- Born: 21 March 1831; Bishopsgate, London, England
- Died: 9 November 1906 (aged 75); Cheltenham, Gloucestershire, England
- Occupations: Educator, suffragist
- Known for: Second Principal of The Cheltenham Ladies' College and founder of St Hilda's College, Oxford

Dorothea Beale LL.D. (21 March 1831 – 9 November 1906) was a suffragist, educational reformer and author. As Principal of Cheltenham Ladies' College, she became the founder of St Hilda's College, Oxford.

== Early and family life ==
Dorothea Beale was born on 21 March 1831 at 41 Bishopsgate Street, London, the fourth child and third daughter of Miles Beale, a surgeon, of a Gloucestershire family who took an active interest in educational and social issues. Her mother, Dorothea Margaret Complin, of Huguenot extraction, would have eleven children. She was first cousin to Caroline Frances Cornwallis, a relationship that influenced the young Dorothea. Educated till the age of 13 partly at home and partly at a school at Stratford, Essex, Dorothea attended and supervised her brothers' home education in Latin. She determined, she tells us, to follow her brothers’ lessons on her own account as well as theirs, and thus was enabled to gain a thorough knowledge of Latin grammar.' Dorothea then attended lectures at Gresham College and at the Crosby Hall Literary Institution, and developed an aptitude for mathematics.

In 1847, she and two older sisters began attending Mrs Bray's fashionable school for English girls in Paris, where Dorothea remained till the revolution of 1848 closed the school. Dorothea and her sisters then were among the earliest students at the newly opened Queen's College, Harley Street, London. Their companions included Frances Buss and Adelaide Procter.

== Career ==
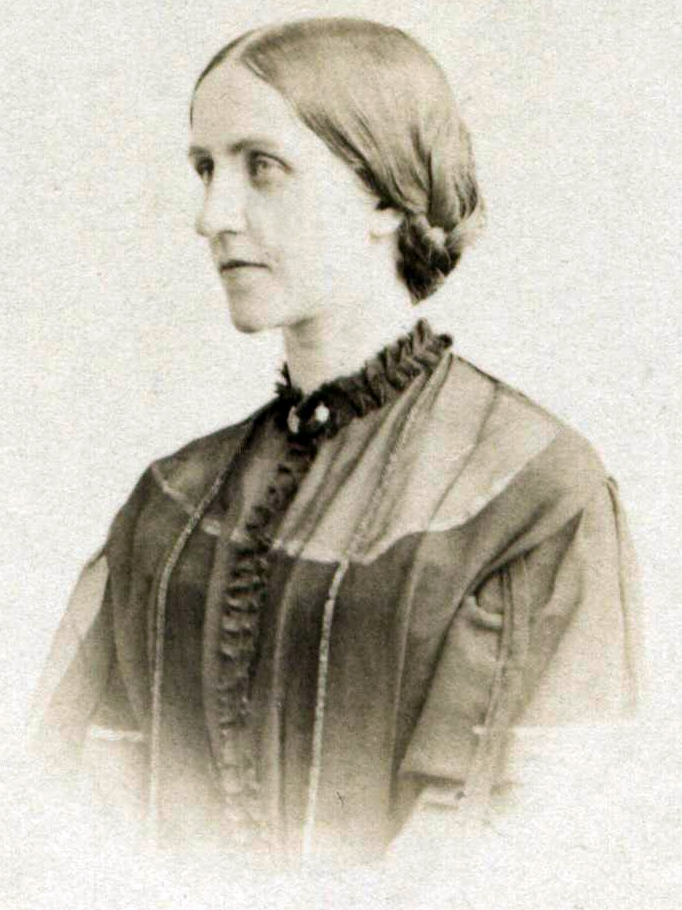
Beale in 1859

In 1849, Dorothea Beale was appointed mathematics tutor at Queen's College, London, and in 1854 she became head teacher in the school attached to the college, under Miss Parry.

In holidays Beale visited schools in Switzerland and Germany. In 1856, for instance, she spent time at the Deaconess's Institute of Kaiserswerth, where she made the acquaintance of Elizabeth Ferard. In the same year, Beale anonymously published a small pamphlet in which she promoted the institute. At the end of 1856, she left Queen's College, dissatisfied with its administration, and in January 1857 became head of the Clergy Daughters' School, Casterton, Westmorland (founded in 1823 by William Carus Wilson at Cowan Bridge). There Beale's insistence on the need of reforms led to her resignation the following December, although many changes in the management of the school were made the next year. In 1858, Beale established a scholarship for Casterton School students to attend Cheltenham.

While seeking fresh work Beale taught mathematics and Latin at Miss Elwall's school at Barnes, and compiled her Students' Text-Book of English and General History from B.C. 100 to the Present Time, for the use of teachers.

On 16 June 1858 Miss Beale was chosen out of 50 candidates to be principal of the Ladies' College, Cheltenham, the earliest proprietary girls' school in England. The school had been opened on 13 February 1854 with 82 pupils on a capital of £2,000. Beale spent the rest of her educational career at Cheltenham. When she began as principal, the school had 69 pupils and only £400 of its original capital remained. For the next two years the college struggled. In 1860, the financial arrangements were reorganised, and by 1863 the pupil count had risen to 126. Thenceforward the college's survival was assured. In 1873, it moved to buildings of its own, which were enlarged three years later, when the school had 310 pupils. In 1880, the college was incorporated as an independent company, by which time the pupil count had reached 500. Numerous additions were made to the buildings between 1882 and 1905. In 1912, the school comprised over 1,000 pupils and 120 teachers, 14 boarding houses, a secondary and a kindergarten teachers' training department, a library of over 7,000 volumes, and 15 acres (6.1 ha) of playing-fields.

As early as 1864, Beale's success as a headmistress was acknowledged. In 1865 she gave evidence before the endowed schools inquiry commission, the seven other lady witnesses including Buss and Miss Emily Davies. The evidence, published in 1868, gave an immense impetus to the education of girls in England. In 1869, Beale published, with a preface by herself, the commissioners' Reports on the Education of Girls. With Extracts from the Evidence. It is a remarkable exposure of the low average standard of the teaching in girls' secondary schools before 1870.

Dorothea Beale saw that the absence of all means of training teachers was a main obstacle to improvement. An endeavour to meet the need was made by a friend at Cheltenham in 1876. Next year, on her friend's death, Beale carried on the work. Progress was rapid: the country's first residential training college, called St Hilda's College, was built in Cheltenham and opened in 1885.

However, to give teachers in training the benefit of a year at Oxford, Beale purchased in 1892 for £5,000, Cowley House, Oxford, which was opened as St Hilda's Hall of Residence for Women in 1893, and was in 1901 joined with the Cheltenham training college as St Hilda's Incorporated College. The students at St Hilda's Hall, Oxford, were mainly, but not exclusively old Cheltonians. A kindergarten class was also started by Beale at Cheltenham in 1876, and a department for the training of kindergarten teachers soon followed, becoming an integral part of the college work.

In 1880, mainly with a view to supplying a link between past and present pupils, Beale founded The Cheltenham Ladies' College Magazine, and remained its editor until her death. With the same aim, she established in 1884 'The Guild of the Ladies' Cheltenham College,' which by 1912 numbered 2,500 members. On 26 October 1889, the Guild started in Bethnal Green the Cheltenham Settlement, which continues as St Hilda's East Community Centre, a house built by past and present pupils and opened on 26 April 1898. As an earnest churchwoman of high church principles guided through life by deep religious feeling, Beale instituted at Cheltenham in 1884 Quiet Days – devotional meetings for teachers – generally at the end of the summer term, when addresses were given by distinguished churchmen.

Outside her college work Beale associated herself with nearly every effort for educational progress, and with local philanthropic institutions. She was president of the Headmistresses' Association from 1895 to 1897, and was a member of numerous educational societies. In 1894 she gave evidence before the Royal Commission on Secondary Education, of which James Bryce was chairman. In collaboration with Soulsby and Dove, she embodied her matured views on girls' education in Work and Play in Girls' Schools (1898).

Beale identified herself with the movement for women's suffrage, being a vice-president of the Kensington Society.

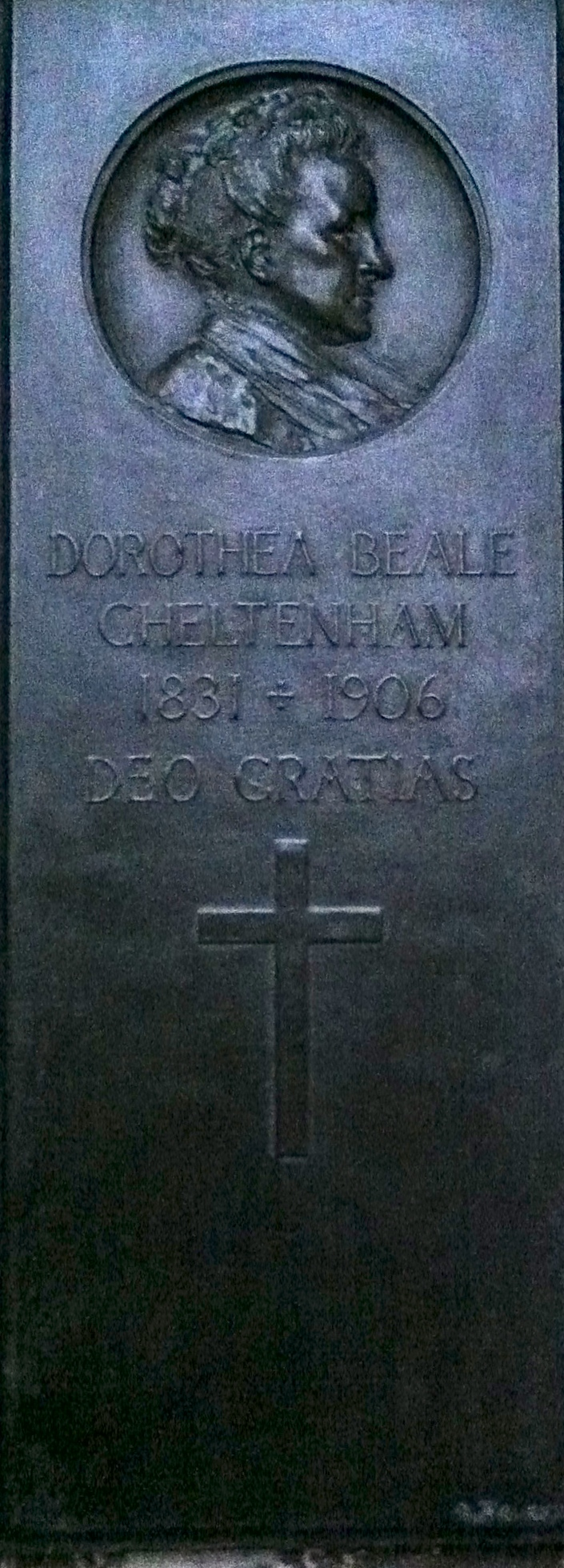
Memorial to Dorothea Beale in Gloucester Cathedral

== Final years and legacy ==
Beale's activities remained unimpaired in her later years, despite deafness and signs of cancer, which became apparent in 1900. On 21 October 1901, the honorary freedom of the Borough of Cheltenham was awarded to her, for her work with the ladies′ college.

On 11 April 1902, the University of Edinburgh awarded her the honorary degree of LL.D., in recognition of her services to education. Until that time, entomologist Eleanor Anne Ormerod had been the only woman who had received such an honorary degree. Cheltenham's staff presented Miss Beale with the academic robes.

Dorothea Beale died after an operation for cancer in a nursing home in Cheltenham on 9 November 1906. Her body was cremated at Perry Barr, Birmingham, and the ashes buried in a small vault on the south side of the Lady Chapel of Gloucester Cathedral.

== Sources ==
- BookRags
