= Frederick Perkins (MP) =

Frederick Perkins MP

Member of Parliament for Southampton
- In office 6 February 1874 – 6 April 1880 Serving with Alfred Giles (1878–1880); Russell Gurney (1874–1878)
- Preceded by: Russell Gurney; Peter Merrick Hoare
- Succeeded by: Henry Lee; Charles Parker Butt

Personal details
- Born: 2 June 1826 Southampton
- Died: 8 November 1902 (aged 76) Southampton
- Party: Liberal
- Spouse(s): Isabella Croskey (m. 1858) Evelina Abraham (m. 1847; died 1848)
- Relations: Walter Perkins
- Children: Seven
- Parent: Richard Hopkins Perkins

Sir Frederick Perkins (2 June 1826 – 8 November 1902) was a British Liberal Party politician, brewer, and wine and spirit merchant.

== Political career ==
Perkins began his political career as a Liberal town councillor for Southampton's All Saints Ward in the 1850s, and shortly after that became Mayor of Southampton, a role he held on five occasions: in 1859, 1861, 1862, 1868, and 1869. During his mayoralty, he received the Prince and Princess of Wales (later King Edward VII and Queen Alexandra) on their way to Osborne House after their wedding in 1863. In 1872, he was then made Sheriff of London and Middlesex, before being knighted in 1873.

He then entered Parliament as MP for Southampton in 1874, but stood down before the next election in 1880.

Perkins was a Justice of the peace and a prominent Freemason, and was elected a member of the Royal Geographical Society in recognition of the interest he took in the North Atlantic Telegraph Cable Expedition which started from Southampton.

== Family ==
Perkins, the son of Richard Hopkins Perkins, married three times during his life. His first marriage to Evelina Abraham, the daughter of Abraham Abraham, of Brussels, was short-lived; they married in 1847, but she died on their first anniversary in 1848, but not before they had a child, Arthur Frederick.

He married again in 1858 to Isabella Bloomfield Croskey (d. 1885), daughter of Joseph Rodney Croskey, American Consul at Southampton. They had six children: Rodney Croskey (born 1859), Richard Harry (born 1864), Julian Tolmé (born 1867), Teresa Macombe, Evelina Daisy, and Amy Bloomfield.

His third marriage in the 1890s was to Mary Sherman, daughter of Robert Sherman, who succeeded him.

Perkins died at Southampton on 8 November 1902.

Parliament of the United Kingdom
Preceded by Russell Gurney; Peter Merrick Hoare	Member of Parliament for Southampton; 1874–1880; With: Alfred Giles (1878–1880); Russell Gurney (1874–1878)	Succeeded by Henry Lee; Charles Parker Butt
