= John Commerell =

Royal Navy Admiral of the Fleet (1829–1901)

Admiral of the Fleet Sir John Commerell VC GCB
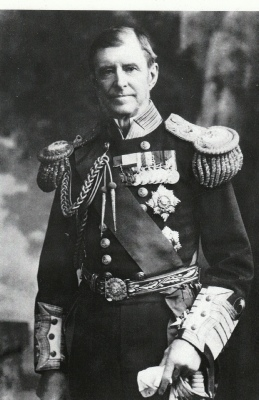
- Sir John Commerell
- Born: 13 January 1829; Grosvenor Square, London
- Died: 21 May 1901 (aged 72); Rutland Gate, London
- Burial place: Cheriton Road Cemetery, Folkestone
- Military career
- Allegiance: United Kingdom
- Branch: Royal Navy
- Service years: 1842–1899
- Rank: Admiral of the Fleet
- Commands: Portsmouth Command; North America and West Indies Station; Cape of Good Hope Station; HMS Monarch; HMS Terrible; HMS Scorpion; HMS Magicienne; HMS Fury; HMS Snake; HMS Weser
- Conflicts: First Opium War; Uruguayan Civil War; Crimean War; Second Opium War; Third Anglo-Ashanti War
- Awards: Victoria Cross; Knight Grand Cross of the Order of the Bath; Order of the Red Eagle (Prussia); Knight of the Legion of Honour (France); Order of the Medjidie, First Class (Ottoman Empire)
- Other work: Member of Parliament

Admiral of the Fleet Sir John Edmund Commerell, VC, GCB (13 January 1829 – 21 May 1901) was a Royal Navy officer. As a junior officer, he was present at the Battle of Vuelta de Obligado in November 1845 during the Uruguayan Civil War. He also took part in operations in Sea of Azov during the Crimean War and went ashore with the quartermaster and a seaman, to destroy large quantities of enemy forage on the shore. After a difficult and dangerous journey they reached their objective – a magazine of corn – and managed to ignite the stacks, but the guards were alerted and immediately opened fire and gave chase. The men had difficulty in escaping, but they finally reached their ship and the lookouts later reported that the forage store had burned to the ground. He and his colleague, Quartermaster William Thomas Rickard, were awarded the Victoria Cross, the highest award for gallantry in the face of the enemy that can be awarded to British and Commonwealth forces.

Commerell went on to be Commander-in-Chief, Cape of Good Hope Station, Commander-in-Chief, North America and West Indies Station and then Commander-in-Chief, Portsmouth. He was also a Conservative politician who sat in the House of Commons from 1885 to 1888.

== Early career ==
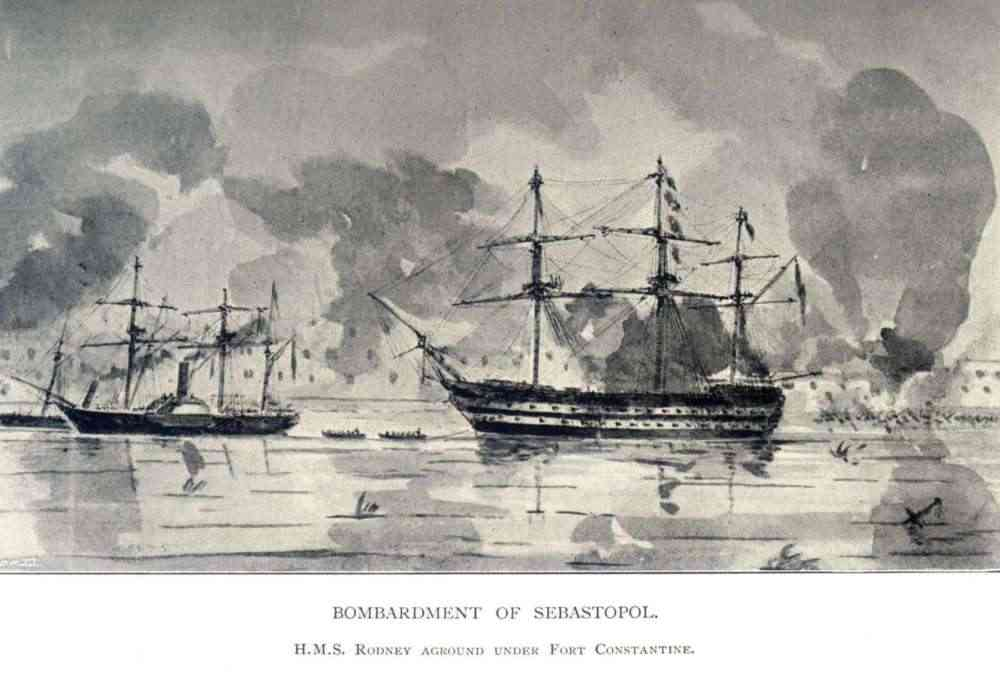
The bombardment of Sevastopol at which Commerell was present: he was awarded the Victoria Cross for his bravery during the Crimean War

Born the son of John Williams Commerell and Sophia Commerell (née Bosanquet), Commerell was educated at Clifton College and joined the Royal Navy in March 1842. He was appointed to the third-rate HMS Cornwallis and saw action in China in August 1842 during the First Opium War. He then transferred to the paddle frigate HMS Firebrand on the South America Station and was present at the Battle of Vuelta de Obligado in November 1845 during the Uruguayan Civil War. At Punta Obligado he helped cut the chain that defended the Paraná River. He transferred to the sloop HMS Comus at Woolwich in May 1848 and, having been promoted to lieutenant on 13 December 1848, transferred to the paddle frigate HMS Dragon in the Mediterranean Fleet in April 1849 and to the screw frigate HMS Dauntless at Devonport in August 1850.

Commerell joined the frigate HMS Vulture in February 1854 and saw action in the Baltic Sea during the Crimean War. He became commanding officer of the gun vessel HMS Weser in February 1855; however the ship caught fire near Constantinople and was beached before being towed off and joining the bombardment of Sevastopol in June 1855. He then took part in operations in Sea of Azov and, having been promoted to commander on 29 September 1855, went ashore with the quartermaster and a seaman, to destroy large quantities of enemy forage on the shore. After a difficult and dangerous journey they reached their objective – a magazine of corn – and managed to ignite the stacks, but the guards were alerted and immediately opened fire and gave chase. The men had difficulty in escaping, but they finally reached their ship and the lookouts later reported that the forage store had burned to the ground. He and his colleague, Quartermaster William Thomas Rickard, were awarded the Victoria Cross. His citation reads:

Date of act of Bravery, 11 October 1855 "When commanding the 'Weser,' in the Sea of Azoff, crossed the Isthmus of Arabat, and destroyed large quantities of forage on the Crimean shore of the Sivash."

Commerell became commanding officer of the steam vessel HMS Snake in the Mediterranean Fleet in February 1856 and, having been awarded French Legion of Honour, 5th class on 2 August 1856 and the Turkish Order of the Medjidie, fifth class on 3 April 1858, he became commanding officer of the paddle sloop HMS Fury on the East Indies and China Station in October 1858. He was second-in-command of a naval brigade which landed in China, but then had to retreat to their boats after facing firm resistance, at Battle of Taku Forts in June 1859 during the Second Opium War.

Promoted to captain on 18 July 1859, Commerell went on to be commanding officer of the paddle frigate HMS Magicienne on the East Indies and China Station in September 1859 and commanding officer of the turret ship HMS Scorpion at Portsmouth in May 1865. After that he became commanding officer of the frigate HMS Terrible in May 1866 and assisted the SS Great Eastern to lay the fifth (and first successful) Atlantic cable. He was appointed a Companion of the Order of the Bath (civil division) on 2 November 1866 and became commanding officer of the turret ship HMS Monarch in the Channel Squadron in May 1869. He was also appointed a Companion of the Order of the Bath (military division) on 2 June 1869.

== Senior command ==
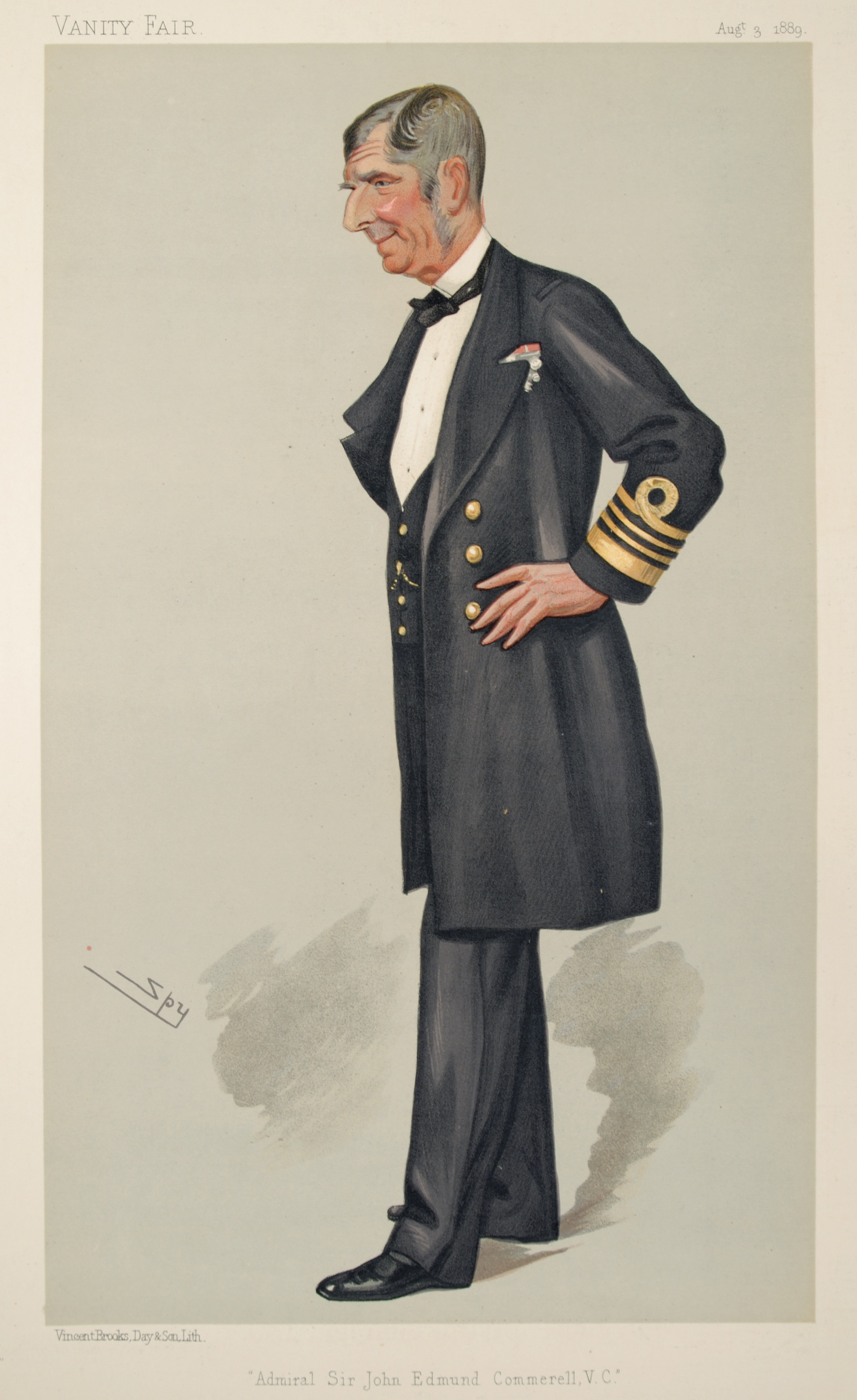
Admiral Sir John Commerell as depicted in Vanity Fair in 1889.

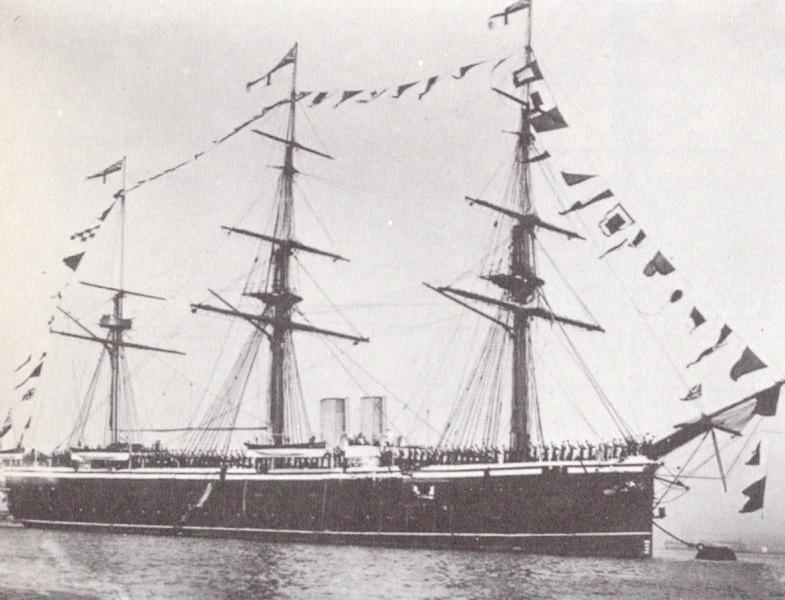
The armoured cruiser HMS Northampton, Commerell's flagship as Commander in Chief, North America and West Indies Station

Promoted to commodore, second class in February 1871, Commerell became Commander-in-Chief Cape of Good Hope and West Coast of Africa Station, with his broad pennant in the corvette HMS Rattlesnake. However, in August 1873, when he was undertaking a reconnaissance up the Pra River at the start of the Third Anglo-Ashanti War, he was wounded in the lung, and had to resign his command. Advanced to Knight Commander of the Order of the Bath on 31 March 1874, he was appointed a Groom in Waiting to the Queen on 26 May 1874.

Promoted to rear admiral on 12 November 1876, Commerell became second-in-command of the Mediterranean Fleet, with his flag in the armoured frigate HMS Agincourt, in July 1877. This was a time of great tension in the region with the Russo-Turkish War at its peak. He then became Junior Naval Lord in the Second Disraeli ministry in December 1879 where he sat until the Government fell in May 1880. In the 1880 general election he stood unsuccessfully for parliament at Southampton.

Promoted to vice admiral on 19 January 1881, Commerell became Commander in Chief, North America and West Indies Station, with his flag in the armoured cruiser HMS Northampton, in November 1882. At the 1885 general election he was elected Member of Parliament for the Southampton seat, which he held until he resigned from the House of Commons on 15 May 1888. As a member of parliament he lobbied hard for the Naval Defence Bill.

Promoted to full admiral on 12 April 1886, Commerell was advanced to Knight Grand Cross of the Order of the Bath on 21 June 1887 and became Commander-in-Chief, Portsmouth in June 1888. He was appointed a Groom in Waiting to the Queen again on 31 December 1891.

Commerell was promoted to admiral of the fleet on 14 February 1892, advanced to the Turkish Order of the Medjidie, first class on 5 March 1894 and retired in January 1899. On 4 February 1901 he was made a Grand Cross of the Prussian Order of the Red Eagle. He died at his home at Rutland Gate in London on 21 May 1901 and was buried at Cheriton Road Cemetery, Folkestone. Edmund Rock and Commerell Point in British Columbia, Canada, were named in his honour. His Victoria Cross is on display in the Lord Ashcroft Gallery at the Imperial War Museum, London.

== Family ==
In 1853 Commerell married Matilda Bushby; they had three daughters. His brother, William, was a first-class cricketer.

== Sources ==
- Heathcote, Tony (2002). The British Admirals of the Fleet 1734 – 1995. Pen & Sword Ltd. ISBN 0-85052-835-6.
- Craig, F. W. S. (1989) [1977]. British parliamentary election results 1832–1885 (2nd ed.). Chichester: Parliamentary Research Services. ISBN 0-900178-26-4.
- Craig, F. W. S. (1989) [1974]. British parliamentary election results 1885–1918 (2nd ed.). Chichester: Parliamentary Research Services. ISBN 0-900178-27-2.

Parliament of the United Kingdom
Preceded by Henry Lee and Alfred Giles	Member of Parliament for Southampton; 1885–1888; With: Alfred Giles	Succeeded by Alfred Giles and Francis Henry Evans
Military offices
Preceded by Sir William Dowell	Commander-in-Chief, Cape of Good Hope Station; 1871–1873	Succeeded by Sir William Hewett
Preceded by Lord Gillford	Junior Naval Lord; 1879–1880	Succeeded by Sir Anthony Hoskins
Preceded by Sir Leopold McClintock	Commander-in-Chief, North America and West Indies Station; 1882–1885	Succeeded by The Earl of Clanwilliam
Preceded by Sir George Willes	Commander-in-Chief, Portsmouth; 1888–1891	Succeeded by The Earl of Clanwilliam
