= William Thomas Rickard =

Recipient of the Victoria Cross

- Born: 10 February 1828; Stoke Damerel, Devonport, Devon
- Died: 21 February 1905 (aged 77); Ryde, Isle of Wight
- Burial place: Town Cemetery, Ryde
- Military career
- Allegiance: United Kingdom
- Branch: Royal Navy
- Conflicts: Crimean War
- Awards: Victoria Cross; Conspicuous Gallantry Medal; Knight of the Legion of Honour (France)
- Other work: Chief Officer, Her Majesty's Coastguard

William Thomas Rickard, VC, CGM (10 February 1828 – 21 February 1905) was a British sailor and a recipient of the Victoria Cross, the highest award for gallantry in the face of the enemy that can be awarded to British and Commonwealth forces.

== Early life and Royal Navy ==
William Thomas Rickard was born at Stoke Damerel, Devonport, on 10 February 1828, and at an early age joined the Royal Navy.

Rickard was 27 years old, and a quartermaster in the Royal Navy during the Crimean War when the following deed took place for which he was awarded the Victoria Cross.

On 11 October 1855 in the Sea of Azov, Crimea, Quartermaster Rickard went with the commander (John Edmund Commerell) of HMS Weser and a seaman George Milestone to destroy large quantities of forage on the shore of the Sivash. After a difficult and dangerous journey they reached their objective—the magazine of corn—and managed to ignite the stacks, but the guards were alerted and immediately opened fire and gave chase. The pursuit was so hot that the seaman, through fatigue, fell into the mud and could not extricate himself. Rickard, however, although he was himself exhausted, went back and assisted him, even though the enemy were keeping up a heavy fire at the distance of thirty or forty yards, as they crossed the mud. The three men finally reached their ship and later the look-outs reported that the fodder store had burned to the ground.

Commander Commerell was also awarded the VC. Rickard's VC is on display in the Lord Ashcroft Gallery at the Imperial War Museum, London.

== Later life and family ==
After retiring from the navy, Rickard joined the Coastguard as boatman, Chief Boatman and latterly as Chief Officer of Coast Guards, retiring sometime in the 1870s.

In June 1860, Rickard married Rebecca Whitingham of Kingsbridge, and they had four sons and two daughters. In retirement Rickard was boatman to the Ryde Rowing Club in the Isle of Wight and he and his family lived at Arethusa Cottage, Smallbrook, Ryde, named after the frigate HMS Arethusa on which he first served in the Crimean conflict. He died on 21 February 1905 and is buried in Ryde cemetery.
