= Copec =

Copec or COPEC may refer to:

- Conference on Politics, Economics and Citizenship, a house improvement society founded by Florence Mary Barrow
- An informal nickname of the Côte d'Ivoire–Ghana Cocoa Initiative
- Empresas Copec, a Chilean energy and forestry company

== See also ==
- Copeck
