= Peter Merrick Hoare =

Peter Merrick Hoare (29 October 1843 – 22 February 1894) was an English Conservative Party politician who sat in the House of Commons from 1868 to 1874.

Hoare was the son of Peter Richard Hoare of Luscombe, South Devon and his wife by Lady Sophia Marsham, daughter of Charles Marsham, 2nd Earl of Romney. He was a J.P. for Devon.

At the 1868 general election Hoare was elected as a member of parliament (MP) for Southampton. He held the seat until his defeat at the 1874 general election.

Hoare died at the age of 50.

Hoare married Edith Augusta Strong, daughter of the Rev. Edmond Strong, Rector of Clyst St Mary in June 1865.

Parliament of the United Kingdom
Preceded by George Moffatt; Russell Gurney	Member of Parliament for Southampton; 1868 – 1874; With: Russell Gurney	Succeeded by Sir Frederick Perkins; Russell Gurney
