= Konstantin Battery =

Coordinates: 44.6268°N 33.5124°E

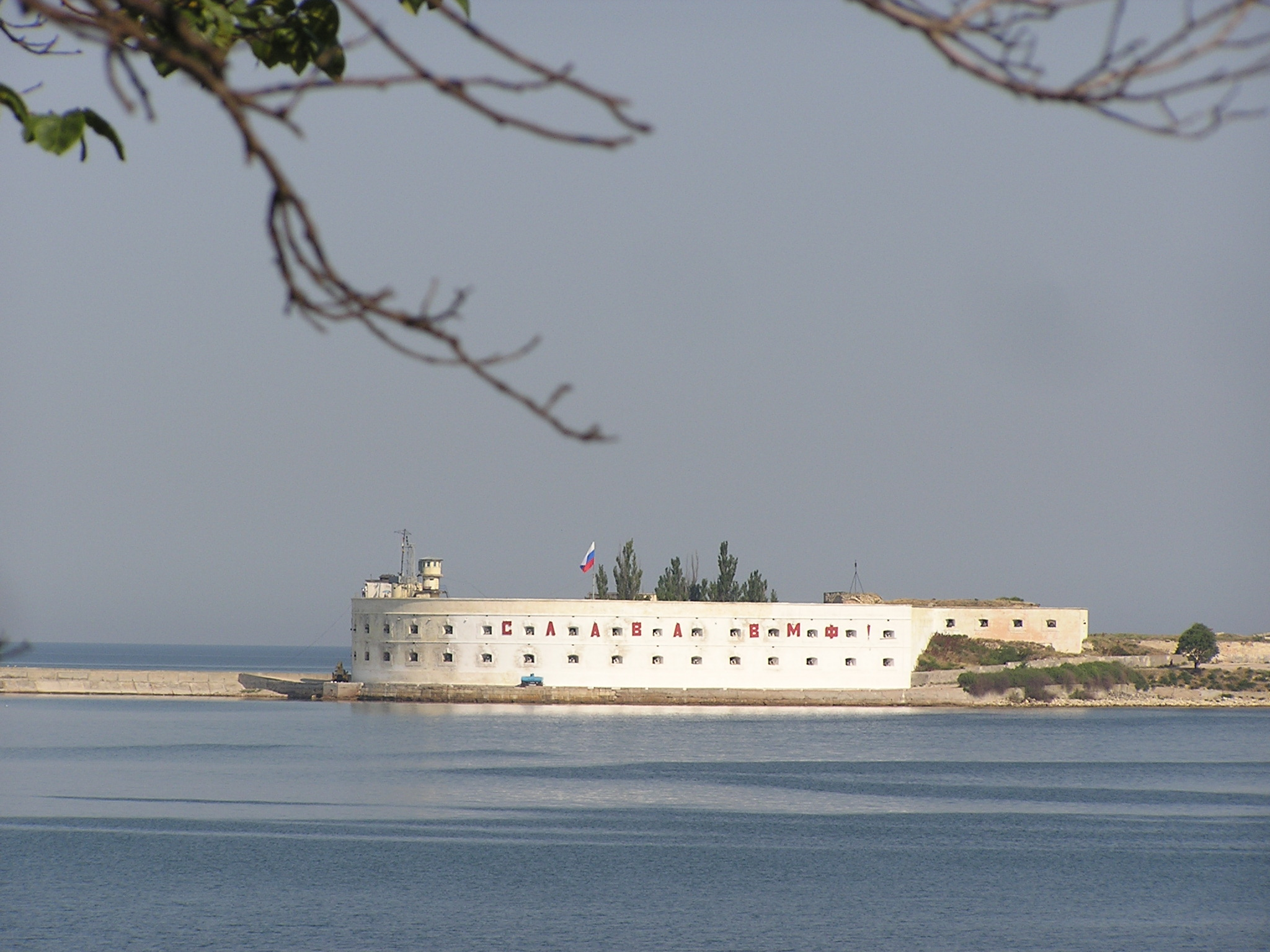

The Konstantin or Consantine Battery is a fortification on the north side of Sevastopol in Crimea, also known as Fort Constantine. Completed in 1840, it was named after Grand Duke Konstantin Pavlovich, younger brother of Alexander I of Russia. It currently houses a museum run by the Russian Geographical Society.

== History ==
Despite renouncing its claims to Crimea in the 1774 Treaty of Küçük Kaynarca, naval ships of the Ottoman Empire still felt able to cruise off the peninsula. They were dissuaded from doing so by Alexander Suvorov's annexation of Crimea and construction of earth fortifications at the entrance to Sevastopol Bay on the night of 15 June 1778, within range of ten Ottoman ships then offshore. In 1794, also on Suvorov's orders, a two-tier stone and earth battery was built to designs by François Sainte de Wollant, who also managed construction of the port of Akhtiar in the city.

In 1834 it was decided to demolish de Wollant's fort and replace it with a stone casemate battery, taking into account more modern developments in fortification design. The new battery was designed by Engineer-Colonel Karl Burno and built by Gustav Efimovich von Volkersam and then Engineer-Colonel Pavlovsky. Its main material was especially strong stone, still mined in Kilen-balka near the city. Shaped like a horse-shoe with a flat roof, the building also contains a barracks. The entrance was designed to create a killing-zone covered by loopholes between two gates.

During the Crimean War the fort was bombarded in 1854 by HMS London, HMS Agamemnon, HMS Bellerophon and the Napoléon and in the 1855 Battle of Kinburn by HMS Terrible and HMS Princess Royal. At that time the battery was equipped with 43 heavy guns in its seaward side; of these, 27 were barbette mounted, with the rest in casemates. From 5 to 10 June 1942, as part of the German Siege of Sevastopol, the battery was one of four strongholds in north Sevastopol ordered to hold until the last man - it was then held by 178th Engineering Battalion of the Black Sea Fleet, soldiers from coastal batteries and part of 95th Infantry Division.
