= Frank Lee Pyman =

English academic and chemist

- Born: 8 April 1882; Malvern, Worcestershire, England
- Died: 1 January 1944 (aged 61); Nottingham, England
- Education: University of Manchester,
- Awards: Fellow of the Royal Society
- Scientific career
- Workplaces: Victoria University of Manchester
- Doctoral advisor: William Henry Perkin, Jr.,

Frank Lee Pyman FRS (8 April 1882 – 1 January 1944) was an English academic and commercial research chemist.

Pyman was born in Malvern, the eldest son of Frank Pyman and his wife Florence Lee, daughter of Henry Lee MP for Southampton. Pyman was a grandson of George Pyman. He studied at University of Manchester and graduated with his PhD in 1902. He worked with Eugen Bamberger at the Zürich Polytechnic. Being back in England he first joined the Thorpe research group, but Wellcome Chemical Works (now GlaxoSmithKline) in Dartford which he joined in 1905 was a better choice for him. In 1919, he went back to the University of Manchester, where he became professor for organic chemistry. After being responsible for the administration of the organic chemistry department he wanted to do more research and therefore joined Boots Pure Drug Co., Ltd. in Nottingham in 1927 where he was appointed Head of the Research Department and he became a Director of the Company in 1929, which appointment he held at the time of his death in 1944 from a protracted illness at the age of 61.
