= Samsung SCH-U470 =

Mobile phone

Samsung Juke SCH-u470
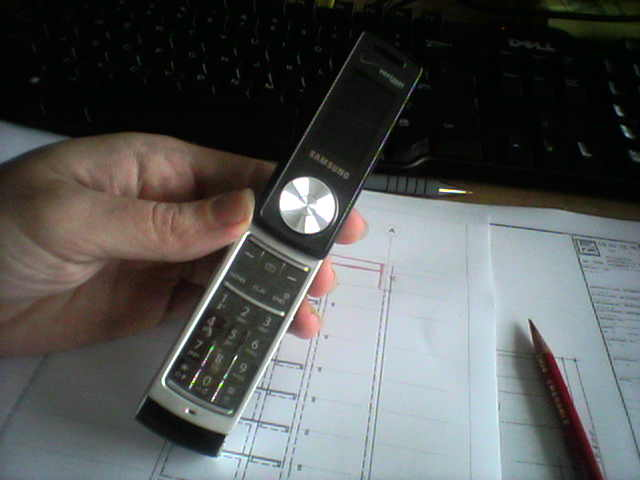
- Manufacturer: Samsung Electronics
- Type: Feature phone
- First released: United States Q4 2007 (Verizon Wireless)
- Availability by region: Q4 2007
- Successor: Samsung YEPP
- Related: Samsung UpStage, Samsung SGH-X830
- Compatible networks: Verizon Wireless
- Form factor: Swivel
- Dimensions: 3.8 × 1.2 × 0.8 in (9.7 × 3 × 2.1 cm)
- Weight: 88 g (2.8 oz)
- Operating system: Brew 3.1.4
- CPU: Qualcomm MSM6125
- Memory: 2 GB
- Storage: Up to 22 MB for pictures, sounds, ringtones; 1.87 GB for music only
- Battery: 750mAh
- Rear camera: 640×480 px (VGA)
- Display: 128×220 px
- Sound: Vibration; Polyphonic ringtones; Non-MP3 audio ringtones obtainable via Get It Now.; Speakerphone; Voice memo; Audio player: MP3, WMA, WMA Pro, AAC, AAC+
- Connectivity: Picture messaging; Bluetooth, supported profiles: HSP (headset), HFP (hands-free), PBAP, A2DP, AVRCP, OPP (vCard), and SPP (not all BT OBEX profiles supported); Mobile instant messenger; Data calls for Get It Now and some apps; GPS (requires separate software download from Get It Now)
- Data inputs: Navigation wheel, keypad, dedicated keys, voice dialing
- SAR: Head: 1.31 W/kg; Body (when worn): 0.558 W/kg.
- Other: Call waiting (network-dependent); Three-way calling (network-dependent); No SIM card due to operator-specific device.

The Samsung SCH-u470, or Juke and Verizon Wireless Juke, was a mobile phone offered exclusively by Verizon Wireless. It was announced on 2 October 2007, and released that same year on Q4 in three colors: red, teal, and navy (blue). The phone is a music player when closed, and can be swiveled for use of the mobile phone. It also has a VGA-resolution camera with a special "night shot" mode for taking photos in low-light conditions.

The official song for this phone is "Juke Box Hero" by Foreigner. But on the commercial, it was misspelled "Jukebox Hero".

In Europe, the phone is known similarly as the SGH-F210 and is sold under T-Mobile UK and O2 Telecom. In Australia it was mistakenly titled the Jukebox until executives clarified the error.

== Features ==
The basic features of the handset beyond call functionality include an alarm clock, a calculator with tip calculations and unit/currency converter, calendar, stopwatch, world clock, and notepad. The phone allows creating an In Case of Emergency (ICE) contact list for emergency access when the device is locked. The user interface of the Verizon device only has English and Spanish display languages.

=== Storage ===
The Juke includes 2 GB of pooled internal flash memory, of which up to 22 MB is available for pictures, ringtones, sounds, and applications, while 1.87 GB is dedicated storage for music only. The phone does not have a microSD card slot, therefore users cannot expand storage beyond what's available.

=== Phone and media management ===
Over-the-air V CAST music downloads are not available. The handset does rely on V CAST Music Manager software as another way to transfer music to the phone, and that program only supports Windows XP, Windows Vista and Windows Media Player version 10, but not Mac OS X or any other operating systems. Music is transferred through an MTP device allowing Windows, Linux, and Android users to download music files from their computer, while Mac OS X requires Android File Transfer for its MTP access. The phone's non-music storage is accessible with BitPim, an open source and multi-platform application to access CDMA phones of various cellphone manufacturers.

=== Music player ===
The device's music player supports MP3, Windows Media Audio (WMA and WMA Pro), and Advanced Audio Coding (AAC and AAC+) file types by default, instead of converting all formats to the WMA format, like most other V CAST phones require. Though it can't play MIDI, SMAF, PMD, QCP, and iMelody files in its music storage as they instead have to be loaded into its phone storage in My Sounds (or My Ringtones).

Music player features include an equalizer and 3D sound settings, playlist creation and music playback by artist, genre, and album. The music player's UI skin can show a visualizer, album artwork or lyrics. When in use, the music player can mostly work in the background; it pauses for phone calls, but stops for outgoing calls, at app launch, and at music synchronization.

=== Messaging ===
In addition to text messaging (SMS), the device also utilizes picture messaging, which among other things allows saving received pictures and audio, including setting the latter up as ringtones. The phone supports sending and receiving e-mail.

The handset also includes Mobile Instant Messaging, which uses data calls, and supports AOL Instant Messenger, Windows Live Messenger, and Yahoo! Messenger. These protocols are no longer supported as of 2015; for example, Microsoft has migrated its users from Windows Live Messenger to Skype. Mobile instant messages are charged per Verizon's text messaging plan.

== Operator-dependent features ==
The phone relies on Verizon's Get It Now application and service for users to buy and download ringtones, images, games, and apps. The service and some applications use datacalls, such as Wikimobile. This could be confused as the Internet, although there appears to be no actual mobile Internet connectivity.

GPS functionality can be enabled through a download via Get It Now, and the location chip must be turned on for use. The phone supports what the manufacturer and operator term as advanced voice encryption (the device contains software from RSA). These functions are exclusive to Verizon Wireless.

== See also ==
Samsung Electronics Samsung YEPP
