= Hampden Gurney Primary School =

Primary school in London

Hampden Gurney C of E Primary School

Location
- 13 Nutford Pl, London W1H 5HA
- Coordinates: 51.5167°N 0.1643°W

Information
- Established: 1863
- Local authority: Westminster
- Head teacher: Evelyn Chua
- Gender: Mixed
- Age: 3 to 11
- Houses: Faraday, Fleming, Nightingale, Wesley
- Website: https://www.hampdengurneyschool.co.uk/

Hampden Gurney C of E School is the top state primary school in England, scoring the highest average score across reading, writing, and mathematics in 2023. The school is based in Marylebone, London.

== History ==
Established in 1863 as a memorial to John Hampden Gurney, it was first situated on Hampden Gurney Street, close to Marble Arch and Oxford Street. In 1936 it was amalgamated with St Luke's school located in Nutford Place operating across two campuses. The school site was destroyed during the Blitz in WW2 and subsequently was rebuilt opening in 1967 by the poet John Betjemen (who went on to become Poet Laureate). During the early 2000s, the school was rebuilt again by BDP Architects with improved facilities as the building which stands on Nutford Place today, close to Hyde Park. The new building development won several awards including the RIBA Award for architecture 2002 (Shortlist for Stirling Prize), Civic Trust Award 2004 and Structural Steel Design Award 2003 (commendation).

== Academics ==
The school ranks in the top 10 state primary schools in the UK by the Sunday Times Schools Guide and the BBC's Primary School League Tables where it ranked joint first in 2014 by attainment scores. Its latest The Sunday Times Schools Guide ranking in 2022 was 4th. In 2023, the school ranked as the most successful school in England as the government released performance figures based on scores across reading, writing and mathematics.
