= Gnokii =

Program suite

- Stable release: 0.6.31 / December 2, 2011; 14 years ago
- Operating system: Cross-platform
- License: GNU GPL
- Website: gnokii.org
- Repository: git.savannah.nongnu.org/gnokii.git

Gnokii is a suite of programs for communicating with mobile phones. It was initially only available for Nokia mobile phones, but later extended to support others. It is available for Linux, BSD unix, Windows, and Mac OS X, and as source code.

Gnokii itself is a console tool, but it is used by several GUIs to communicate with phones; for example: Xgnokii, Gnocky, and Gnome Phone Manager all use Gnokii internally.

It is licensed using the GNU GPL. Recent updates to Gnokii have enhanced support for modern phone models and protocols, including improved handling of 4-byte cell IDs, better encoding management for phonebook entries and SMS messages, and more robust AT command parsing for various phone brands beyond Nokia, such as Sony Ericsson, LG, and Motorola.

== Features ==
- Use to Activate Nokia network monitor
- Supports sending SMS (with delivery report), picture messages, can send/receive ring tones (as SMS)
- Phonebook
- Dial/Receive calls
- Calendar

Connect could be established using serial/USB cables, infrared, Bluetooth.

== See also ==
- OpenSync – Open Source synchronization framework
- Gammu (software) – a program for communicating with mobile phones
- BitPim – Open Source CDMA management and synchronization software
