= Charles Parker Butt =

English High Court judge and Liberal politician

The Right Honourable Sir Charles Butt
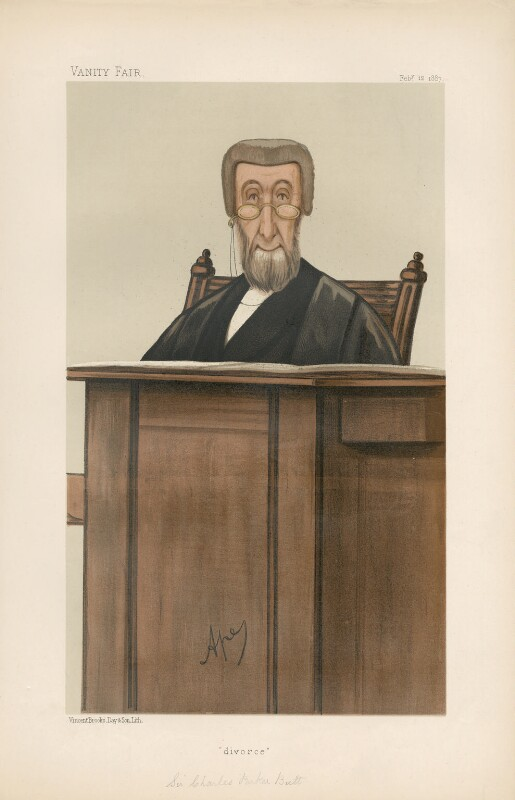
- "Divorce". Caricature by Ape published in Vanity Fair in 1887.

President of the Probate, Divorce and Admiralty Division
- In office 28 January 1891 – 25 May 1892
- Preceded by: Sir James Hannen
- Succeeded by: Sir Francis Jeune

Sir Charles Parker Butt (24 June 1830 – 26 May 1892) was an English High Court judge and a Liberal politician who sat in the House of Commons from 1880 to 1883.

== Life ==
Butt was the third son of the Rev. Phelpes John Butt, of Wortham Lodge, Bournemouth, and his wife Mary Eddy, daughter of Rev. John Eddy, Vicar of Toddington, Gloucestershire. He was educated privately and called to the Bar at Lincoln's Inn in 1854. He practised on the Northern Circuit and became a Q.C. in 1868.

At the 1880 general election, Butt was elected Liberal member of parliament (MP) for Southampton and he held the seat until 1883, when he was appointed Justice of the High Court and assigned to the Probate, Divorce and Admiralty Division, (of which he became President on 29 January 1891) and knighted.

== Family ==
Butt married Anna Georgiana Rodewald, daughter of C. Ferdinand Rodewald of 57 Onslow Square, London, in 1878.

Parliament of the United Kingdom
Preceded by Alfred Giles; Frederick Perkins	Member of Parliament for Southampton. 1880–1883; With: Henry Lee	Succeeded by Henry Lee; Alfred Giles
