= HMS Terrible (1845) =

Frigate of the Royal Navy

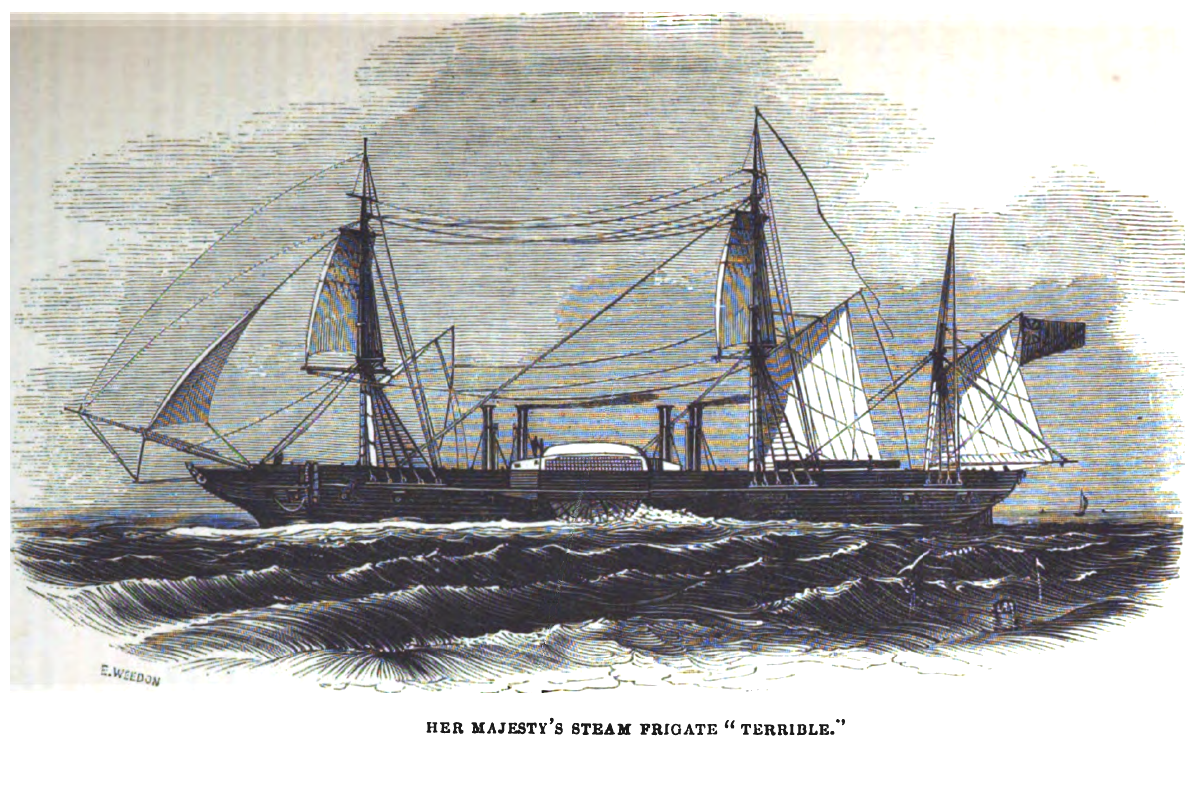
- 1845 engraving of HMS Terrible

History

United Kingdom
- Name: HMS Terrible
- Ordered: From Woolwich Dockyard on 22 July 1842; Re-ordered from Deptford Dockyard on 24 February 1843
- Builder: Deptford Dockyard; Engines by Maudslay, Sons & Field
- Laid down: November 1843
- Launched: 6 February 1845
- Completed: 25 March 1846
- Renamed: Ordered as HMS Simoom; Renamed on 23 December 1842
- Fate: Sold for breaking up on 7 July 1879

General characteristics
- Type: First class steam paddle frigate
- Displacement: 3,189 tons
- Tons burthen: 1,847 7/94 bm
- Length: 226 ft 2 in (68.94 m) (overall); 196 ft 10.25 in (60.0 m) (keel)
- Beam: 42 ft 6 in (12.95 m)
- Draught: 27 ft (8.2 m)
- Propulsion: 4-cyl. (72 in diam., 8 ft stroke) direct-acting "Siamese" type engine; 4 × tubular boilers; 800 nhp; 2,059 ihp
- Speed: 10.9kts under engines
- Complement: 200
- Armament: Main deck: 4 × 68 pdrs; 4 × 56 pdrs; 3 × 12 pdrs; Upper deck: 4 × 68 pdrs; 4 × 56 pdrs

HMS Terrible was when designed the largest steam-powered wooden paddle wheel frigate built for the Royal Navy.

== Characteristics ==
=== Dimensions ===
Terrible was designed by Oliver Lang, master shipwright at Woolwich Dockyard. Her length of 226 feet exceeded that of HMS Trafalgar by 21 feet 6 inches.

=== Construction ===
Terrible was laid down at Deptford Dockyard on 13 November 1843 under the name HMS Simoom. She was renamed on 23 December 1842, and launched on 6 February 1845. She was constructed of Honduras mahogany, East India teak, and well seasoned English oak. She had one deck more than Retribution. With three masts and four funnels in two widely spaced pairs, she had a unique appearance among ships of this type.

=== Propulsion ===
The engines of Terrible were made by Maudslay and Co. and were a similar pair as those on Retributution. They cost 41,250 GBP and each was rated at 400 nominal hp. The weight of the engines was 212 tons, the boilers 250 ton, the water in the boilers 138, the paddle wheels 44 and the coal boxes 16 tons, for a total of 560 tons. The coals boxes were to contain 800 tons of coal. Therefore, a total of 1,360 tons was spent on the propulsion.

=== Armament ===
The heavy machinery still left some weight that could be spent on the armament. Plans were to mount 16 56-pounder 85 cwt guns and 4 10-inch 84 cwt shell guns. The 56-pounders would be mounted in a broadside arrangement between decks. Of the shell guns two would be mounted on pivots, and two as broadside guns on the weather deck. The boats would be armed with one brass 6-pounder, two 18-pounder carronades, and two 12-pounder carronades. Later the brass 6-pounder and two brass carronades were said to be saluting, or signal guns. In service Terrible was armed with 8 68-pounder and 8 56-pounder guns; by the time of the Crimean war the 56-pounder was considered obsolescent and was being replaced by the 68-pounder; the 10-inch shell gun was obsolete.

== Career ==
=== Service in the Channel and the Mediterranean ===
Terrible was commissioned on 5 December 1845 under the command of Captain William Ramsay and was first attached to the Channel Fleet. In 1847, she was sent to Portuguese Angola to transport the Portuguese exiles under the leadership of the Count of Bonfim back to Lisbon, as stipulated by the Convention of Gramido. On 2 January 1850, she ran aground at Plymouth whilst on a voyage from Portsmouth to Lisbon, Portugal. She was refloated and taken in to Plymouth. Subsequently, she served in the Mediterranean.

=== During the Crimean War ===
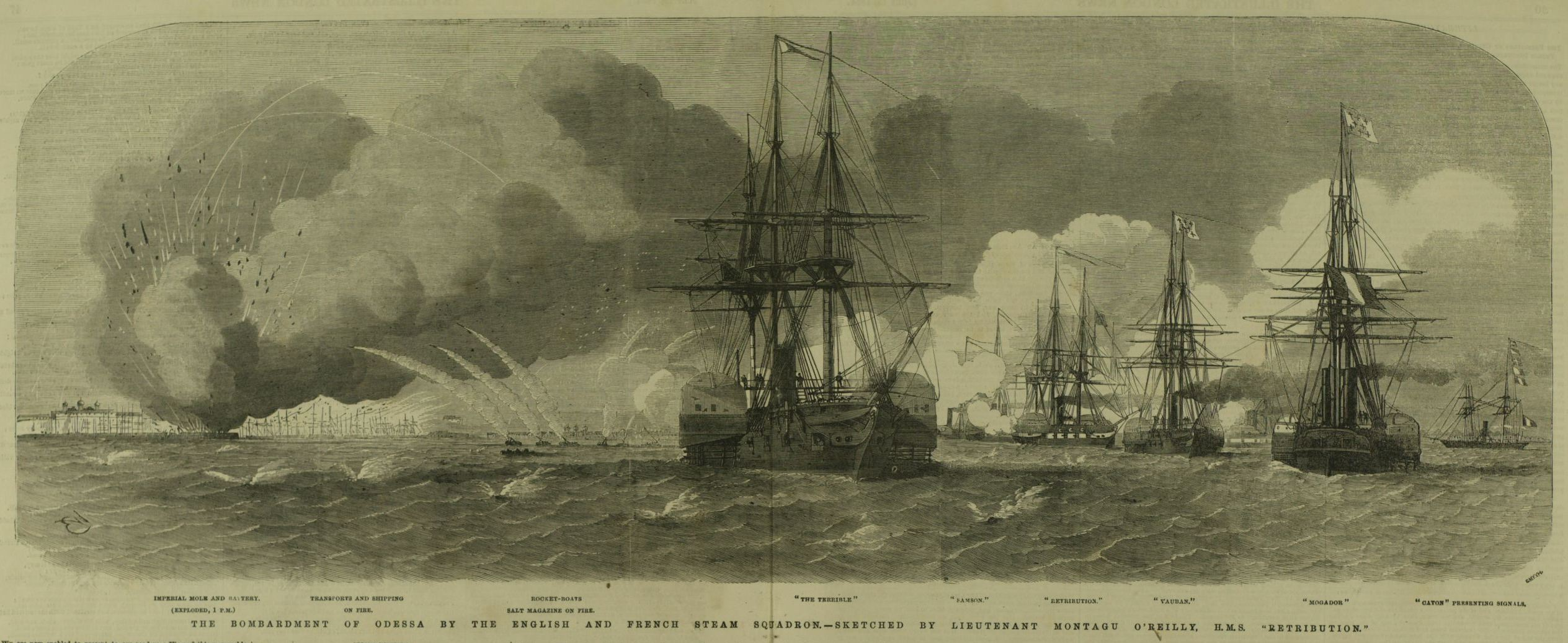
Terrible at the Bombardment of Odessa by the English and French Steam Squadron in 1854

Terrible saw active service during the Crimean War. On 6 November 1853, commanded by Captain James Johnstone McCleverty, she left England carrying Rear-Admiral Sir Edmund Lyons, who had been appointed second-in-command of the Mediterranean Fleet. Terrible then joined Admiral James Dundas's fleet in the Black Sea, where she served during the Crimean War. On 7 October 1854, she landed some of her 68-pounder guns at Balaclava to be used in the siege of Sevastopol. At the naval bombardment of Sevastopol on 17 October, Terrible was the northernmost ship of the Allied line and successfully bombarded the Konstantin Battery, the northern fort protecting Sevastopol harbour.

=== Further service ===
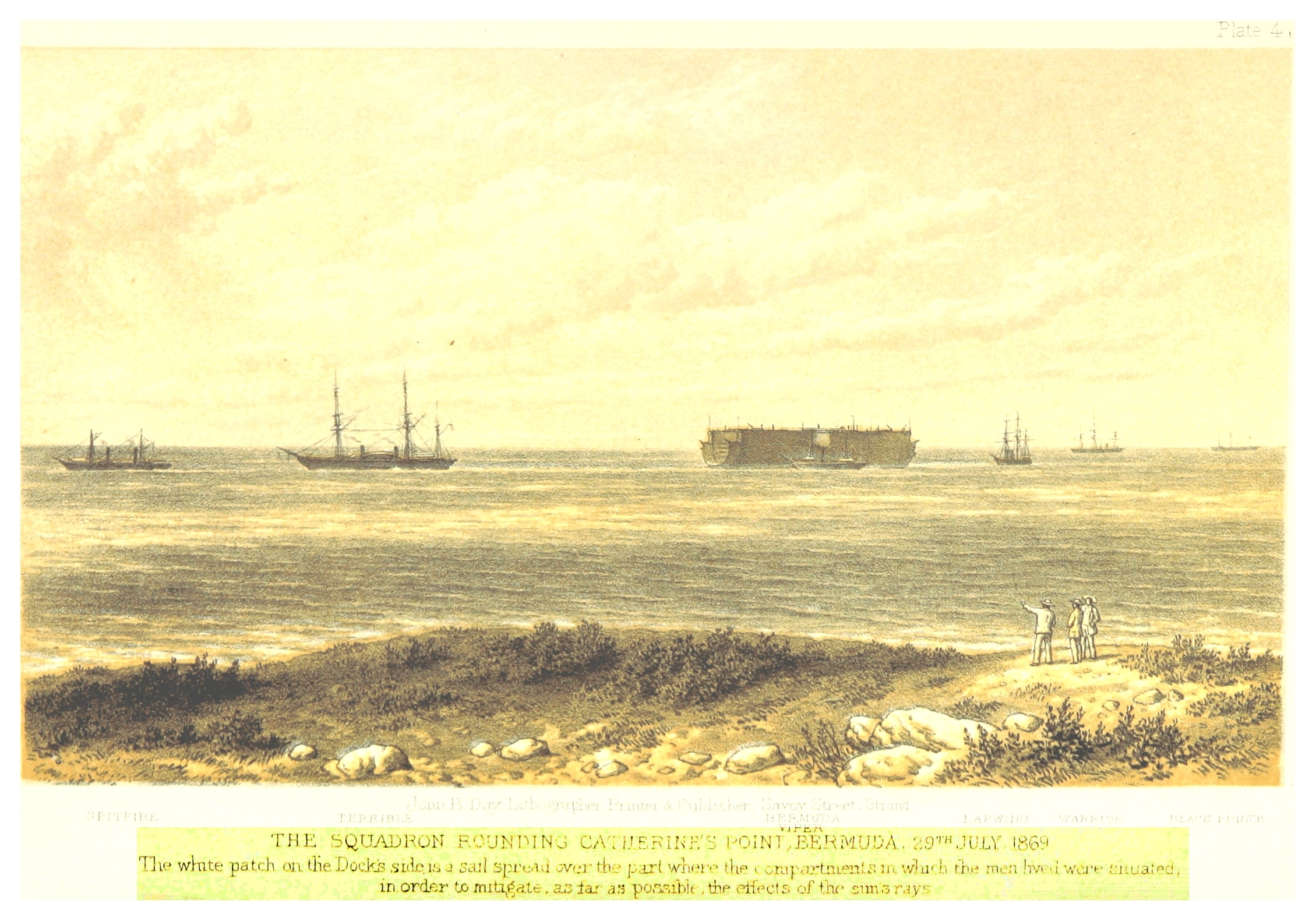
Terrible towing the floating dry dock around St. Catherine's Point, Bermuda, 29 July 1869

Between 30 November 1858 and February 1859, Terrible was put at the disposal of William Gladstone for the duration of his tenure as Extraordinary Lord High Commissioner of the Ionian Islands. On 14 January 1865, she ran aground at Sheerness, Kent. In 1866, commanded by Captain John Commerell, Terrible helped the SS Great Eastern to lay the fifth (and first successful) Atlantic cable. In 1869, she was one of three ships employed to move the specially built 'Bermuda' floating dry dock across the Atlantic from Madeira to the Royal Naval Dockyard on Ireland Island, in the Imperial fortress colony of Bermuda. The dock was towed by HMS Warrior and HMS Black Prince with Terrible lashed astern to act as a rudder, the voyage lasting 39 days.

She was broken up in 1879.

== See also ==
- List of frigate classes of the Royal Navy
