= Florence Mary Barrow =

English International Aid worker

Florence Mary Barrow (27 January 1876 – 3 March 1964) was an English International Aid worker, Quaker and housing reform activist particularly associated with her home city of Birmingham. She co-founded the Birmingham Conference on Politics, Economics and Citizenship (COPEC) House Improvement Society that pioneered municipal slum clearance and the regeneration of inner-city housing. She served on the Council of Birmingham Civic Society for 30 years.

== Early life ==
Florence Barrow was born on 27 January 1876 in Birmingham, to Richard Cadbury Barrow (1827–1894), Quaker businessman and mayor of Birmingham (1888–89), and his wife, Jane, née Harrison (b. 1831). She was educated at Edgbaston High School and Mason College, Birmingham. Together with her mother, brothers and sisters-in-law, she was a supporter of Birmingham Women's Suffrage Society and was active in a number of social welfare and reform initiatives in Birmingham. She started an adult literacy class in 1894.

In 1900 Barrow trained as a social worker at St Hilda's Settlement in Bethnal Green, London. She began her career as an aid worker in Russia before moving to Poland and later to the Middle East and the Balkans.

== Career ==
Like others, Barrow was politicised by the First World War. She applied for permission to attend the controversial Women's Peace Congress at The Hague in 1915, but was denied permission to travel. In 1916 she embarked on a long period of humanitarian relief work with the Friends' War Victims Relief Committee. After a brief period in France working at a quarantine station for Serbian refugees on the Frioul islands near Marseille, she was sent was sent from Newcastle by sea to Murmansk to do Quaker relief work in Buzuluk, western Russia. She remained in Russia during the revolutions of 1917 working on feeding, clothing and medical programmes, as well as establishing occupational workshops, orphanages, nurseries for refugee children, and even a circulating library. The Russian revolution, the collapse of the Russian empire, and the ensuing civil war (1917–1921) had profound consequences for the displacement of population. In her autobiographical recollections, she reflected:

Before deciding exactly what form our relief work should take many hundreds of families of refugees were visited. I do not know that I ever have had a sadder & more depressing piece of work. To go into house after house & find old men, women, girls, children sitting inert unoccupied & hopeless, unwelcome guests in an already overcrowded home. One after another would tell of the good house they had left in the west surrounded by a pleasant fruitful garden.

Language and the need for an interpreter was a constant barrier for Barrow, who struggled to learn Russian even though she already spoke French and German. The British and later the American Society of Friends established hospitals, orphanages and workshops in Samara, as well as shelters in Moscow for refugees in transit. Barrow left Russia by travelling east on the Trans-Siberian Railway, reached Japan, and then America, before crossing the U-boat-infested Atlantic in a camouflaged vessel in order to report back to the Society of Friends in London.

In 1919, following the end of the war, Barrow was one of the first civilians allowed into defeated Germany to investigate conditions on behalf of the Quaker Relief Services. In January 1920 Barrow travelled to Poland on behalf of the Friends War Victims Relief Committee (FWVRC) Her work in Poland involved the provision of housing in a country devastated by war, in addition to supplying food, clothing medical aid and education. In June 1921, she became the leader of British and American Quaker relief efforts in Poland. It was at this time that she met the American journalist Anna Louise Strong – and remarked that the dysentery, lice and exhaustion from which Strong was suffering was just her "Russian training". Barrow remained in Poland until 1924 but kept in touch with the relief work in Poland for many years.

On returning to Birmingham, Barrow continued her work with the settlement movement, throwing herself into the newly formed Housing Improvement Society, COPEC that pioneered municipal slum clearance and the regeneration of inner-city housing. Copec was named after the Christian Conference on Politics, Economics and Citizenship which was held in Birmingham in 1924. The issue of housing was a matter of increasing concern in Birmingham in the inter-war period. Barrow sold a house to buy the first Copec properties, 19 back-to-back houses in Pope Street. She moved out of 35 Frederick Road and downsized to number 23, which is where her blue plaque is sited, giving the difference in price to Copec. She also acted as a rent collector in Nechells and was very involved in promoting the work, giving talks and writing leaflets to raise awareness and funds for the organisation. In one appeal she wrote that "even the poorest house was a home", and that society had a responsibility to provide decent and affordable homes for all. She was the driving force for over 37 years behind "practical schemes of reconditioning, reconstruction, conversion and rebuilding" (The Friend). Barrow was a member of Copec's committee from its foundation until shortly before her death, and served as its Honorary Secretary from 1928 to 1954.

At the same time as she was working voluntarily for Copec she was engaged in a number of other initiatives, most notably as honorary secretary of the Birmingham Council of Community Associations founded in 1930 to coordinate amenities on the new housing estates in North Birmingham.

She joined the all-male Council of the Birmingham Civic Society in 1928, and remained on it for the next 30 years: for most of that period she was the only female member. The Civic Society was in some ways a family interest: members of Cadbury family, who were closely related to the Barrows, were involved from the outset; and Florence's brother, Walter Barrow, was a founding member of the council and served on it for many years.

At the age of 56, in 1932, she left Birmingham for Syria, Salonika, and Egypt to work once more with refugees. During the later 1930s the Quakers sent her as a secret agent to Nazi Germany and Austria, taking messages to and from endangered Jews. She later said she had found it "very trying to know that every conversation might be overheard" and reported to the Gestapo.

At the start of the Second World War, Barrow continued to organise the reception of Jewish refugees from Nazism. In 1958 the City of Birmingham awarded her its Civic gold medal for its services to its urban housing programme, including the provision of low-rental accommodation for single working women and sheltered housing for the elderly and handicapped. They regretted to report that her active days as a social worker were almost finished, at the age to 82. It applauded, "Miss Barrow's practical and constructive attitude towards social problems", and went on to explain that the Civic Society was "anxious that the quiet and modest way in which Miss Barrow has laboured on behalf of the City" should receive full recognition. Many of the tributes to her that followed her death in 1964 also portrayed a strong but calm, quiet and very modest woman. As the testimony provided by Warwickshire Monthly meeting to Britain Yearly Meeting put it, "Quiet and modest, her outward appearance gave little indication of the power within."
