= Henry Lee (Southampton MP) =

British Member of Parliament

Lee in 1880

Henry Lee (29 November 1817 – 27 December 1904) was a Manchester cotton manufacturer and Liberal Party politician who sat in the House of Commons from 1880 to 1885.

== Biography ==
Henry Lee was the second son of Lee Lee of Chorley, Lancashire and his wife Anne Cocksey, daughter of Joseph Cocksey.

Although his father left only a modest fortune, Henry Lee became a leader of Tootal, Broadhurst, Lee, one of the great textile firms of Lancashire. He was a director of the Manchester Chamber of Commerce and of the Manchester and Salford Bank. He was a J.P. for Lancashire and the borough of Salford.

Lee stood unsuccessfully for parliament in Salford at the 1874 general election. At the 1880 general election he was elected as a Member of Parliament (MP) for Southampton, and held the seat until his defeat at the 1885 general election. He contested Manchester North West at the 1886 election, without success.

Lee died in 1904 at his home, Bedford Lodge, Broughton Park, Broughton and was buried in Weaste Cemetery. He had married Hannah Dracup, daughter of John Dracup of Salford in 1846. His daughter Florence was the mother of Frank Lee Pyman.

Parliament of the United Kingdom
Preceded by Alfred Giles; Sir Frederick Perkins	Member of Parliament for Southampton; 1880 – 1885; With: Charles Parker Butt 1880–83; Alfred Giles 1883–92	Succeeded by Sir John Commerell; Alfred Giles
