= Alfred Giles (civil engineer) =

British civil engineer and politician

- Born: London
- Engineering career
- Discipline: Civil
- Institutions: Institution of Civil Engineers (president)

Alfred Giles (3 October 1816 – 1895) was a British civil engineer and Conservative politician who sat in the House of Commons between 1878 and 1892.

Giles was born in London, the second son of Francis Giles canal builder and railway engineer and his wife Mary Ann Wyer, daughter of Samuel Wyer of Birmingham. He was educated at Charterhouse School and became a civil engineer, constructing railways and dock works in Britain and overseas. He was consulting Engineer to Southampton Dock Co., chairman of Union Steamship Co. and a director of Commercial Union Fire and Life Assurance Co. Giles was also created a Knight of the Order of the Dannebrog by King Christian IX of Denmark. He lived in Godalming in Surrey.

Giles was elected Member of Parliament for Southampton, first winning his seat in a by-election in 1878, sitting as a Conservative. He lost his seat at the 1880 General Election but regained it in another by-election in 1883. He retained his seat at the 1885 and 1886 General Elections but was defeated in 1892 by the Liberal Party's Francis Evans.

Giles served as president of the Institution of Civil Engineers from May 1893 to May 1894.

Giles married Jane Emily Coppard, daughter of John Coppard of Hastings in 1838. Their son Charles Tyrrell Giles was a lawyer and politician. They also had a daughter, Mary.

Parliament of the United Kingdom
Preceded by Russell Gurney; Frederick Perkins	Member of Parliament for Southampton; 1878–1880; With: Sir Frederick Perkins	Succeeded by Henry Lee and Charles Parker Butt
Preceded by Charles Parker Butt; Henry Lee	Member of Parliament for Southampton; 1883–1892; With: Henry Lee (1883–1885); John Edmund Commerell (1885–1888); Francis Evans (1888–1892)	Succeeded by Tankerville Chamberlayne; Francis Evans
Professional and academic associations
Preceded by Harrison Hayter	President of the Institution of Civil Engineers; May 1893 – May 1894	Succeeded by Robert Rawlinson
