= Russell Gurney =

English lawyer and Conservative Party politician

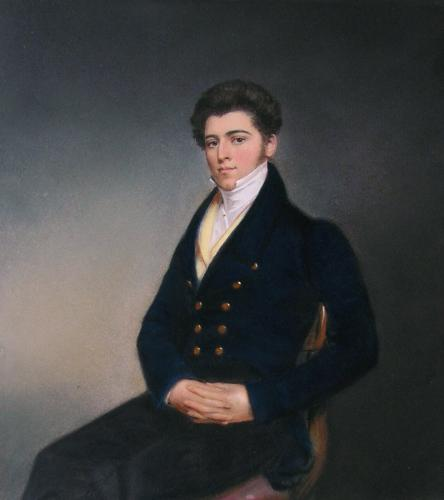
- portrait by Ellen Sharples
- Born: 2 September 1804; Surrey
- Died: 31 May 1878 (aged 73); London
- Occupation: Politician
- Spouse(s): Emelia Russell Gurney
- Parent(s): John Gurney; Maria Hawes
- Relatives: John Hampden Gurney
- Position held: member of the 20th Parliament of the United Kingdom (1868–1874), member of the 19th Parliament of the United Kingdom (1865–1868)

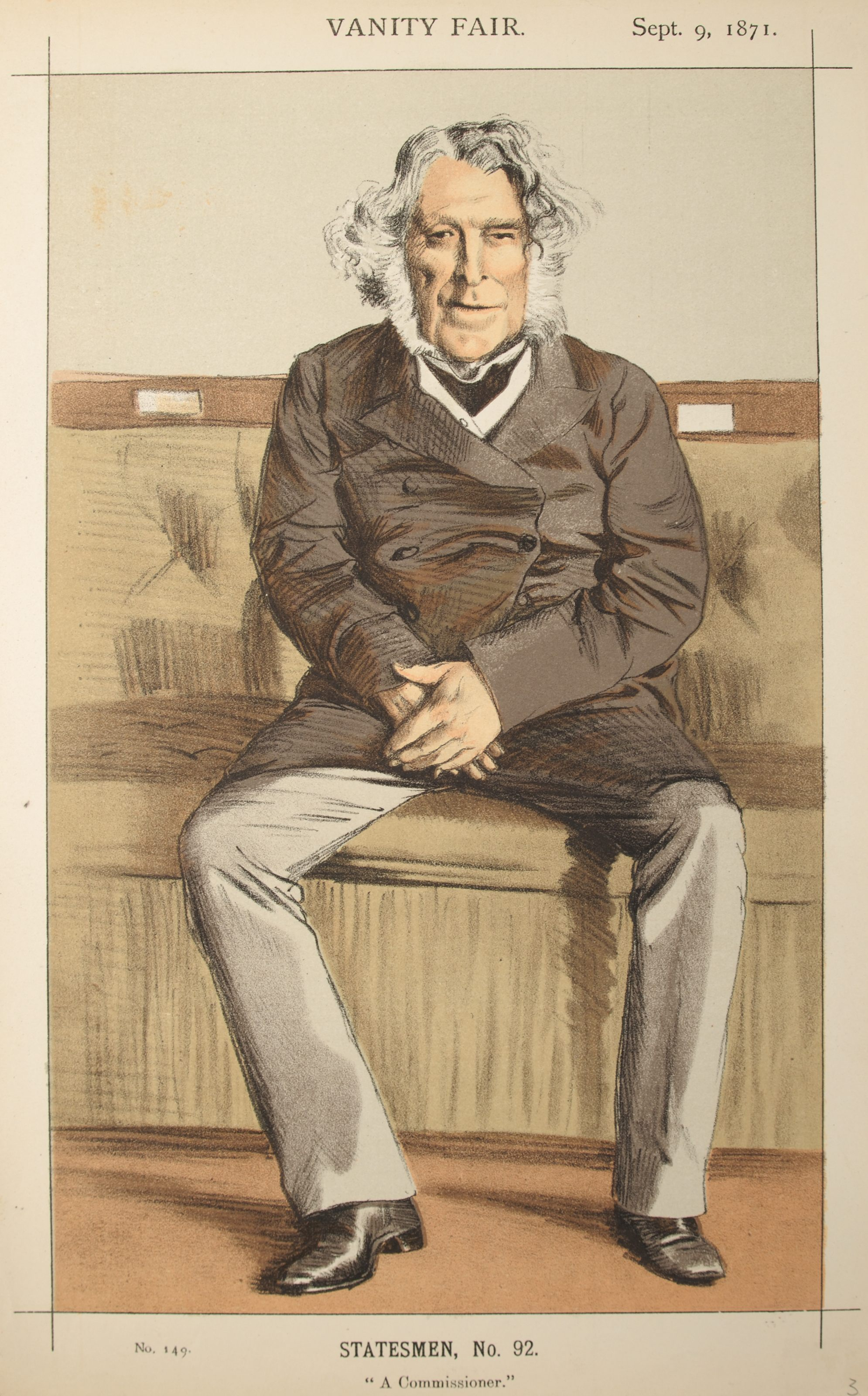
Vanity Fair caricature of Gurney by James Tissot

Russell Gurney, FRS (2 September 1804 – 31 May 1878) was an English lawyer and Conservative Party politician who sat in the House of Commons from 1865 to 1878.

== Life ==
Gurney was born at Norwood, the son of Sir John Gurney, a Baron of the Exchequer and his wife Maria Hawes daughter of William Hawes MD. He was educated at Dunham Norfolk under Mr Jowett and at Trinity College, Cambridge and was called to the bar at the Inner Temple, of which became a bencher in November 1828.

In 1845 he was made a Queen's Counsel and in 1856 was elected Recorder of London. He occasionally acted as Judge of Assize, and went the Western, Oxford, Northern, and North Wales circuits. He was a Commissioner of the Jamaica Rebellion inquiry and was sworn a member of the Privy Council in 1866, in recognition of his services. He was one of the Boundary Commissioners appointed by the Representation of the People Act 1867. He was chairman of the Law Reversionary Interest Society, deputy chairman of the Law Fire Insurance Co., and a director of the Law Life Assurance Co.

At the 1865 general election Gurney was elected as a Member of Parliament (MP) for Southampton. He held the seat until his death at the age of 73 in 1878. In Parliament he was in charge of several important measures including the Criminal Law Amendment Act 1867, the Married Women's Property Act 1870, the Public Prosecutor's Bill of 1871, the Public Worship Regulation Act 1874 and the Medical Act 1876 (39 & 40 Vict. c. 41), an act which repealed the previous Medical Act in the United Kingdom and allowed all British medical authorities to license all qualified applicants whatever their gender.

He was elected a Fellow of the Royal Society in 1875.

== Family ==
Gurney married Emelia Batten (born 26 July 1823, died 1896), daughter of Rev. Ellis Batten, one of the masters of Harrow School in 1852. She was a member of the Kensington Society and her correspondence was published.

Parliament of the United Kingdom
Preceded by William Digby Seymour; William Anderson Rose	Member of Parliament for Southampton; 1865 – 1878; With: George Moffatt 1865–68; Peter Merrick Hoare 1868–74; Sir Frederick Perkins 1874–80	Succeeded by Alfred Giles; Sir Frederick Perkins
