= François Sainte de Wollant =

Flemish engineer (1752–1818)

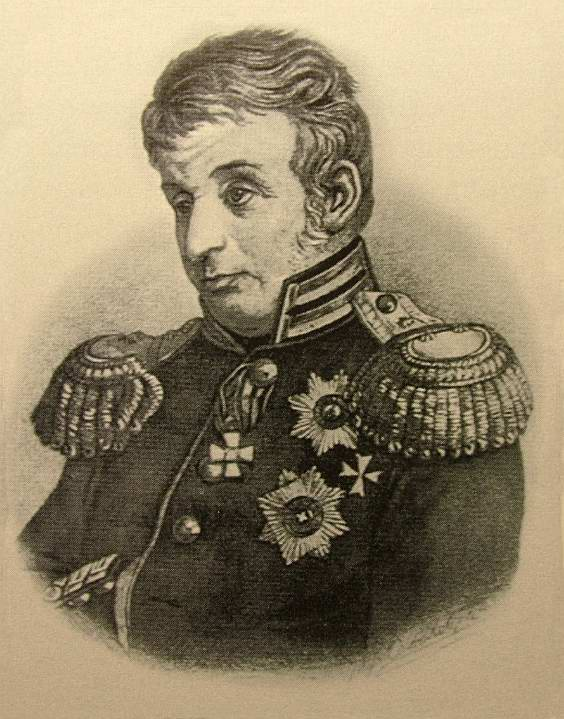
Portrait of François-Paul Sainte de Wollant, c. 1800–1805

François-Paul Sainte de Wollant (20 September 1752 in Antwerp – 30 November 1818 in Saint Petersburg) was a Flemish engineer. He is best known for a number of fortifications in Imperial Russia which were built under his supervision, such as a now-lost 1794 battery on the site of the later Konstantin Battery in Sevastopol. In Tiraspol, Transnistria, a park is named after him.
