= Andrew Jukes (surgeon) =

Andrew Jukes (17 December 1774–10 November 1821) was a surgeon of the East India Company. He arrived in Iran in 1808 as a member of Sir Harford Jones’ diplomatic mission. Jukes vaccinated Tehrani children against smallpox in 1813, in the hopes of stemming the ravages of an epidemic. His effort met with little success. He was married in 1814 in Paris to Georgina Ewart, granddaughter of Ephraim Lópes Pereira d'Aguilar, 2nd Baron d'Aguilar and had four children, most of whom settled in Canada: Andrew John Jukes (1815), Mark Richard Jukes (1817), Augustus Jukes (1821, he was the surgeon who assisted at the trial of Louis Riel), and daughter Laura Eliza (1819-1836).

Jukes stayed in Iran until his death (probably due to Asiatic cholera) in 1821. He was tended to during his last days by his travel companion, the Scottish writer James Baillie Fraser, who described Jukes's death in a letter to his father, how he 'closed the eyes of my only friend and companion'. Fraser oversaw his burial in the Armenian Monastery of Sourp Amenaprgich in New Julfa neighborhood of Isfahan.

Jukes was an avid painter and poet; his sketches of Persepolis and other locations in Persia were last known to be in the possession of his grandson Hamilton Augustus Jukes in Manitoba, Canada.
