= Betty Jukes =

British artist (1910-2006)

- Born: Edith Elizabeth Jukes; 19 December 1910; Shillong, British India
- Died: 2006 (aged 95–96)
- Education: Royal College of Art
- Known for: Sculpture

Edith Elizabeth Jukes (19 December 1910 – 2006), known as Beth Jukes and Betty Jukes was a British artist and sculptor.

== Biography ==
Jukes was born at Shillong in India. Her parents were Gertrude Elizabeth King and Captain Andrew Monro Jukes, a military doctor who died in 1918. Jukes was educated in London at the Norland Place School in Kensington and studied at the Royal College of Art in London from 1928 to 1932, where Henry Moore was among her teachers. During World War II Jukes worked with evacuees in Scotland before returning to London to train as a nurse and qualified as a state registered nurse at St Bartholomew's Hospital in 1945. Jukes taught sculpture at the Sir John Cass College School of Art and the City of London Polytechnic from 1947 until 1975.

Working in clay, wood, stone, bronze and plaster, Jukes created busts, reliefs and statuettes and between 1935 and 1966 she exhibited works at the Royal Academy in London. Jukes became a member of the Royal Society of British Sculptors in 1948 and was elected a Fellow of the Society in 1961 and was also a member of the Society of Portrait Sculptors.
