= 1878 Southampton by-election =

UK Parliamentary by-election

The 1878 Southampton by-election was fought on 14 June 1878. The by-election was fought due to the death of the incumbent Conservative MP, Russell Gurney. It was won by the Conservative candidate Alfred Giles.
