= Reginald Jukes =

English rugby league footballer

Personal information
- Full name: Reginald Jukes
- Born: 21 April 1921; Pontefract, Yorkshire
- Died: 22 September 1999 (aged 78); Pontefract, West Yorkshire

Playing information
- Position: Loose forward
Club
Years	Team	Pld	T	G	FG	P
1939–47	Featherstone Rovers	16	1	0	0	3

Reginald Jukes (21 April 1921 – 22 September 1999) was a professional rugby league footballer who played in the 1930s and 1940s. He played at club level for Featherstone Rovers. Reginald Jukes was the older brother of Albert Jukes, the rugby league footballer who played in the 1940s and 1950s, for Featherstone Rovers.

== Playing career ==
Reginald Jukes made his début for Featherstone Rovers on Saturday 18 November 1939.
