= Kensington Society (women's discussion group) =

British women's discussion society (1865–1868)

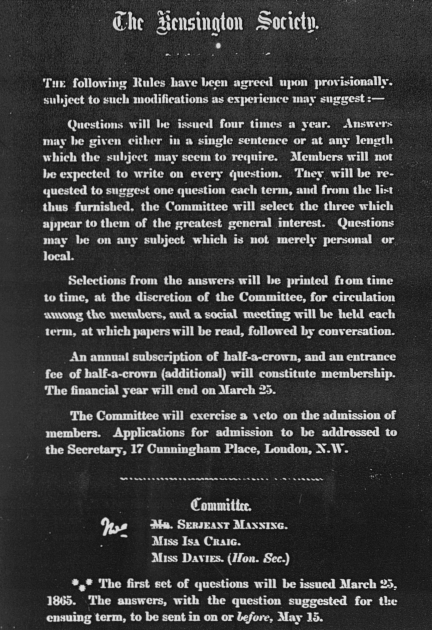
Kensington Society Rules

The Kensington Society (1865–1868) was a British women's discussion society in Kensington, London, which became a group where rising suffragists met to discuss women's rights and organised the first campaigns for female suffrage, higher education and property holding.

== History ==
The society, formed in March 1865, met at the Kensington home of its president, Charlotte Manning, and enjoyed a close relationship with English institutions of higher education amenable to women. Most members were young, unmarried, educated, middle class women. Nine of the original 11 members were not married, suggesting a broader commitment to female empowerment. The society included: Barbara Bodichon, Emily Davies, Frances Buss, Dorothea Beale, Jessie Boucherett, Elizabeth Garrett Anderson, Helen Taylor, Charlotte Manning, Anna Swanwick, Anne Clough, and Rosamond Davenport Hill. Another early member, Emilia Russell Gurney, was the wife of Russell Gurney who introduced legislation in parliament on women's rights to property and to practise medicine. Membership expanded to 33 members by the official founding, a total of 58 members in the following year and 67 by its end in 1868.

In the interest of maximum efficiency and discussion quality, each member submitted a discussion question before meetings. Charlotte Manning, Isa Craig, and Emily Davies selected the three questions of "greatest interest" to the group and presented them. The members exchanged response papers and discussed them at the following meeting. By giving all of its members the opportunity to participate in constructive debate and discussion, the society allowed competent and educated women to articulate their thoughts for further expansion of the suffrage and more egalitarian political movements. The society charged the substantial sum of two shillings and sixpence annually and the same sum for each meeting. Manning's house was used because it could accommodate the number of women who attended. Some of the women were confident, where as others used the society as a place where they could discuss a wide range of subjects privately. The opinions expressed at the meetings were not recorded but the subjects chosen included the obedience of daughters, whether boys and girls should be taught the same subjects and whether women could aspire to be members of parliament or magistrates should they ever be given the vote.

On 28 April 1866, society members Barbara Bodichon, Emily Davies and Jessie Boucherett drafted a petition for the enfranchisement of, "all householders, without distinction of sex, who possess such property or rental qualifications as your Honorable House may determine." This petition was the first of its kind, but cleverly and specifically excluded married women, whose enfranchised husbands held their property and held the power to stifle the document. The Kensington Society relied on social networks to obtain 1,499 signatures. The Society petitioned Henry Fawcett and John Stuart Mill, Parliament members who favored universal suffrage. Mill added an amendment giving women equal political rights to the Reform Bill in 1866 and, with Fawcett, presented it to Parliament. The legislature defeated the amendment with a 196 to 73 vote, but the Kensington Society persisted.

Following this defeat, the society decided to try new tactics. On 5 July 1867, it was renamed the London National Society for Women's Suffrage and formed a loose federation with a similar group based in Manchester and Edinburgh called the National Society for Women's Suffrage (NSWS). Eventually, 17 similar organisations allied and became the National Union of Women's Suffrage Societies (NUWSS) and were key to the ultimate success of the women's suffrage movement.

The Kensington Society facilitated discussion between progressive and driven women of 19th century London. Their discussion and political actions served as the foundation for women's suffrage movements and catalysed political action. Several of its members continued advocating change to and beyond the point where English women exercised the right to vote. Though only officially active from 1865 to 1868, the Kensington Society served a crucial role in the establishment of women's suffrage in the United Kingdom.
