= William Shaen =

British radical and lawyer

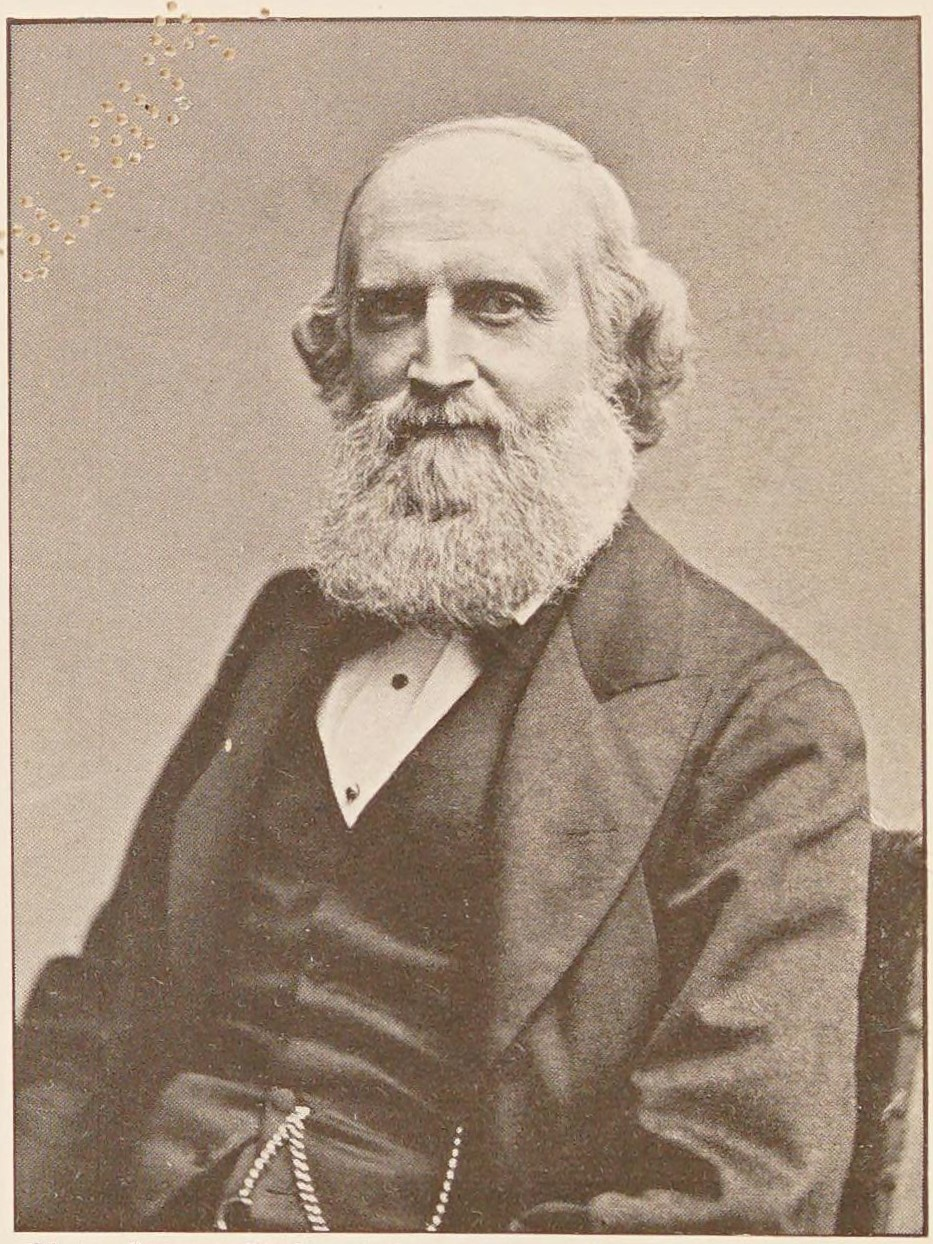
- Born: 31 October 1820; Hatfield Peverel, Essex
- Died: 2 March 1887 (aged 66); Kensington, London
- Burial place: Kensal Green Cemetery
- Monuments: Shaen Wing, Bedford College, London
- Education: University College London; University of Edinburgh
- Occupations: Lawyer and radical
- Spouse: Emily Winkworth (married 1851–1887)

William Shaen (31 October 1820 – 2 March 1887) was a British radical and lawyer. An active supporter of women's education, he helped to found Bedford College, London.

== Early life and education ==
William Shaen was born on 31 October 1820 in Hatfield Peverel, Essex to Rebecca née Solly and Samuel Shaen. Samuel Shaen was a lawyer, and the family were wealthy Unitarians. Samuel Shaen had been one of the first nonconformists appointed a county magistrate after the repeal of the Test and Corporation Acts in 1828.

William was educated at a nonconformist school in Brighton, where he met Peter Taylor, who became a lifelong friend. From 1833 to 1836, Shaen attended the University College School in London, going on to read classics at University College, graduating in 1840. He gained his MA in 1842 and was awarded a gold medal in philosophy. In 1848, Shaen acted as secretary to the Committee of Graduates working to secure a permanent home for the university. He was elected a Fellow of the college, and was also Clerk of Convocation for ten years.

Shaen studied law at The University of Edinburgh, planning to become a barrister. Though he began reading for the bar at the Middle Temple, he chose instead to become a solicitor, and was articled in 1844 to the radical William Henry Ashurst. Shaen was admitted to the profession in 1848, and that year played a central role in creating the Metropolitan and Provincial Law Association, acting as its inaugural secretary.

On 2 September 1851 Shaen married Emily Winkworth (1822–1887), daughter of manufacturer Henry Winkworth. With her sisters Susanna and Catherine, Emily was active in Manchester nonconformist circles, and friends of the novelist Elizabeth Gaskell. Gaskell's husband, William, a Unitarian minister in Manchester, led the marriage service. The Shaens had at least two daughters and a son.

== Radical activity ==
Part of a large group of influential middle-class Unitarians in London, Shaen associated closely with the radical Ashurst family and was, like them, drawn to social and political reform. In the early 1840s, Shaen helped Italian revolutionary Giuseppe Mazzini establish a school for Italian children in London.

Shaen combined a successful solicitor's practice with active support for various British and international causes, including women's education and suffrage, Italian unity and democracy, the abolition of slavery, and the repeal of the Contagious Diseases Acts. Significant legal cases with which Shaen was concerned included the Jamaica committee in 1866 and W. T. Stead in the early 1880s, whose journalism helped the passage of the Criminal Law Amendment Act 1885, or "An Act to make further provision for the Protection of Women and Girls, the suppression of brothels, and other purposes."

Shaen also acted as solicitor for the London School of Medicine for Women (LSMW), which opened in October 1874, and as the Gaskells' family solicitor. An advocate of women's university education, Shaen was connected with the movements to establish Newnham College and Girton College, Cambridge, and Oxford's Somerville Hall, as well as in the establishment of the London School of Medicine for Women, and of Bedford College. For Bedford College, Shaen wrote the trust deeds.

Shaen was a trustee of Dr. Williams's Library, a member of the committee of the British and Foreign Unitarian Association, and on the managing committee of the Royal Normal College for the Blind.

== Death and legacy ==
Shaen died suddenly at his home in Kensington on 2 March 1887, and was buried in Kensal Green cemetery.

An extension to Bedford College, built 1889–1890, was called the Shaen Wing for him.

Shaen's entry in the Dictionary of National Biography concludes that:

His generosity, enthusiasm, organizing ability, and persistence, combined with intellectual clarity, had won for him the confidence and affection of all who had dealings with him and a considerable reputation as a lawyer and a humanitarian.

In a memoir of her father published in 1912, Margaret J. Shaen wrote:

From the family [nonconformist] tradition thus inherited he doubtless derived somewhat of that firm grasp of principle which characterised all his public work, and something, too, of that patient persistence, that steadfast courage, in attacking great wrongs, or fighting what might seem almost overwhelming odds, which made those who stood beside him feel that the weakest cause grew strong when he took it in his hands.

Shaen is listed today as one of the "famous residents" of Kensal Green Cemetery.
