= Mount Jukes =

Mount Jukes may refer to:

- Mount Jukes (Queensland)
- Mount Jukes (Tasmania)
