= Juke music =

Juke, as a term being used to describe genres of music, was during different times used to denote:

- Ghetto house, especially used for faster tracks within the genre, but also used as a blanket term for ghetto house itself.
- Footwork, a fast, abstract and syncopated genre of electronic dance music that evolved from ghetto house during the late 1990s and early 2000s.
