= HMS Weser =

Two vessels of the Royal Navy have been named HMS Weser for the River Weser:

- HMS Weser was the French frigate Weser, or Wezer launched in 1812 in Amsterdam. The British Royal Navy captured her on 21 October 1813. As HMS Weser she served in North American waters and then was sold for breaking up in September 1817.
- HMS Weser was the SMS Nix, built for the Prussian Navy in the early 1850s. In 1855, Nix was sold to the Royal Navy in exchange for the sail frigate Thetis. Weser saw action during the Crimean War at the Battle of Kinburn in October 1855. Thereafter she was based in Malta. She was ultimately decommissioned in 1865, used as a harbor ship, and then sold to ship breakers in 1873.
