= St Hilda's East Community Centre =

Charity in London, England

Coordinates: 51.5250°N 0.0743°W

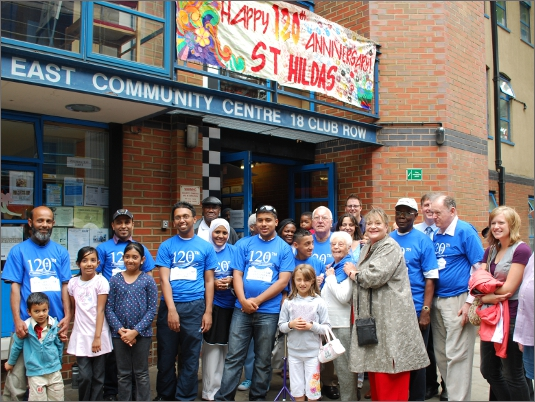
St Hilda's East Community Centre staff and users pose with actress Sylvia Syms before a sponsored walk in honour of the organisation's 120th anniversary.

St Hilda's East Community Centre is a charity based in the London Borough of Tower Hamlets. The centre is located in Shoreditch in Central London and its second site, Sonali Gardens, is in Shadwell in East London.

St Hilda's East Community Centre works with local people of all backgrounds, offering a wide range of activities. This includes advice services, youth projects, support for parents and pre-school children, work with older people, women’s projects, volunteering placement and carers’ respite.

It was founded as a settlement in 1889 by the Guild of Cheltenham Ladies' College.

== History ==
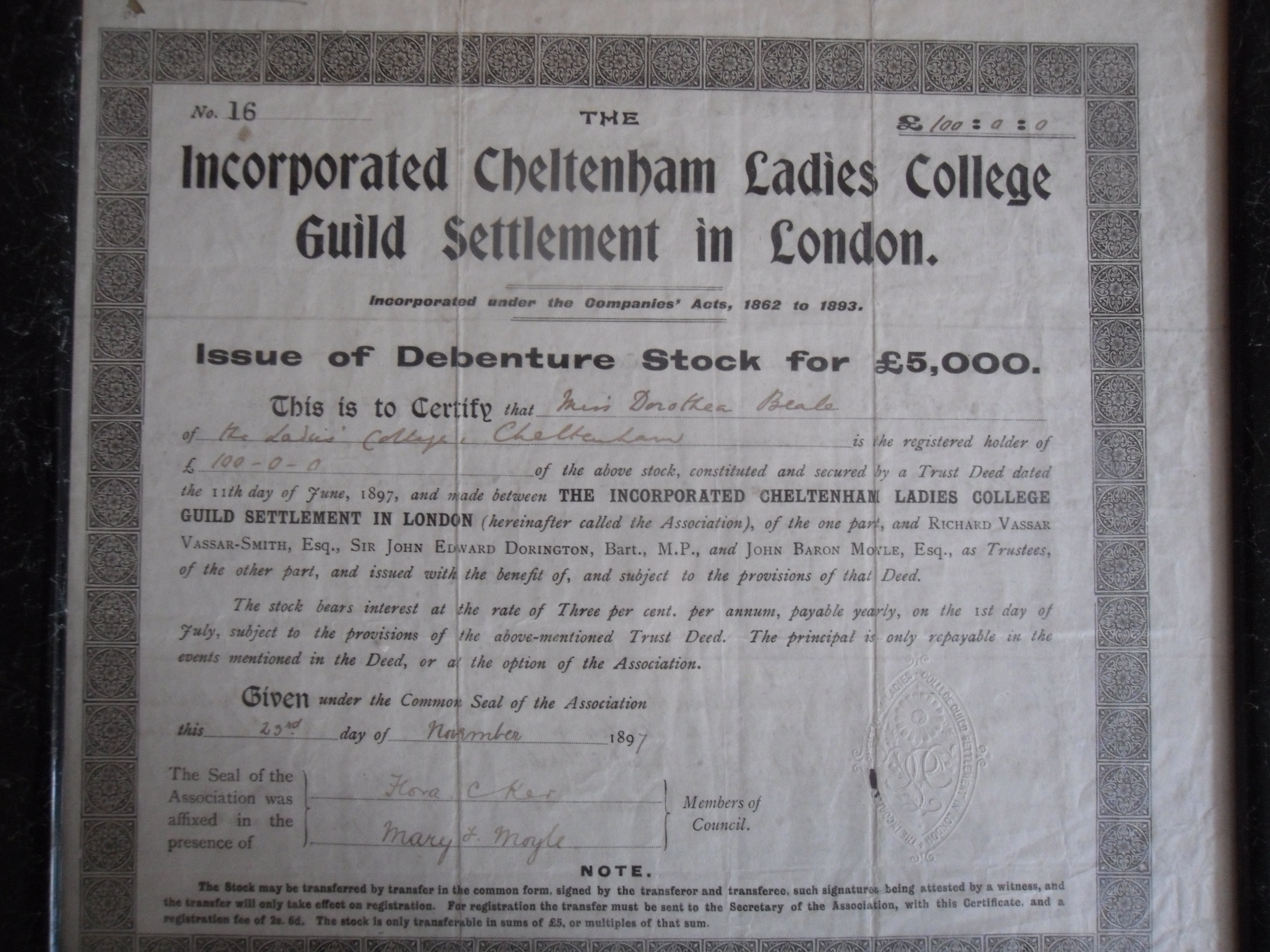
Dorothea Beale's £100 stock in the Incorporated Cheltenham Ladies' College Guild Settlement in London.

After its first building in Victoria Park Square proved unsuitable, St Hilda's East found a permanent base on Old Nichol Street near the newly built Boundary Estate in 1898.

In 1945, the settlement had also purchased another building across the road, Bruce Hall. The new building stood where St Hilda’s East is today on the corner of Old Nichol Street and Club Row.

In 1964, the building on Old Nichol Street was sold and all activities moved into the site on Club Row, which was extended in 1968. There were no more residents, no live-in Warden, and more paid staff were employed to run the centre. The buildings were replaced in 1994.

In 2005, St Hilda's became a two-site organisation when the Bengali Elders Day Centre moved to a purpose-built facility, Sonali Gardens, in Shadwell.

== Current Work ==
The community centre now offers a range of services and opportunities for local people of all ages and backgrounds, providing a resource for the community in the Weavers Ward in northwest Tower Hamlets, while also delivering borough wide social care services.

The work of St Hilda's East today broadly covers the areas of Older People and Care, Young People (including under 5s) and Women's Groups and Advice, Training and Resources (such as legal advice, a community archive, and training).
