= Andrew Jukes (missionary) =

Andrew Jukes (1847 – 28 April 1931) was a Canadian Anglican missionary and doctor. He translated the Four Gospels into the Jatki dialect of Punjabi, as well as producing a prominent bilingual dictionary of the language.

== Biography ==
Jukes was born in Canada, educated at Blundell's School and went on to receive his education as a doctor in Britain. In 1878 he was appointed as a medical missionary by one of the principal missionary organization of the Church of England, the Church Missionary Society (C.M.S). He was attached to society's Punjab and Sindh mission, which covered virtually all of present-day Pakistan. He was sent to Baloch mission at Dera Ghazi Khan where he stayed until 1906.

== Work ==
Jukes' main work was the translation of the Bible into the local language. Here Jukes was fortunate in his assistant, Muhammad Hassan S /O Sher Muhammad. Jukes acknowledged his services on many occasions. Jukes continued his work both at the translation of books of the Bible and at the task of a full bilingual dictionary.

In 1898 the translation of the four Gospels were completed. Jukes's dictionary of the Jatki Punjabi language contains more than ten thousand entries.

With the financial help of the Government of India, Jukes' Jatki (Western Panjabi) English dictionary was published in 1900.

== Related missionaries ==
Jukes's brother, Worthington Jukes (1849–1937) was also a CMS Missionary in Amritsar, Punjab, North India (1872–74) and Peshawar (1874–1890). His elder brother Mark Jukes (1842–1932) spent fourteen years in missionary work at Emerson, Manitoba. Six of his nephews and nieces, children of his sister Marianne Jukes (1846–1915) and her husband James Watney (1836–1891), were also missionaries in Africa, India, China, and the Middle East.

== Bibliography ==
- Dictionary of Jatki or Western Punjabi Language
