= John Hampden Gurney =

Anglican clergyman and hymnist

John Hampden Gurney (15 August 1802 – 8 March 1862) was an Anglican clergyman and hymnist.

== Life ==
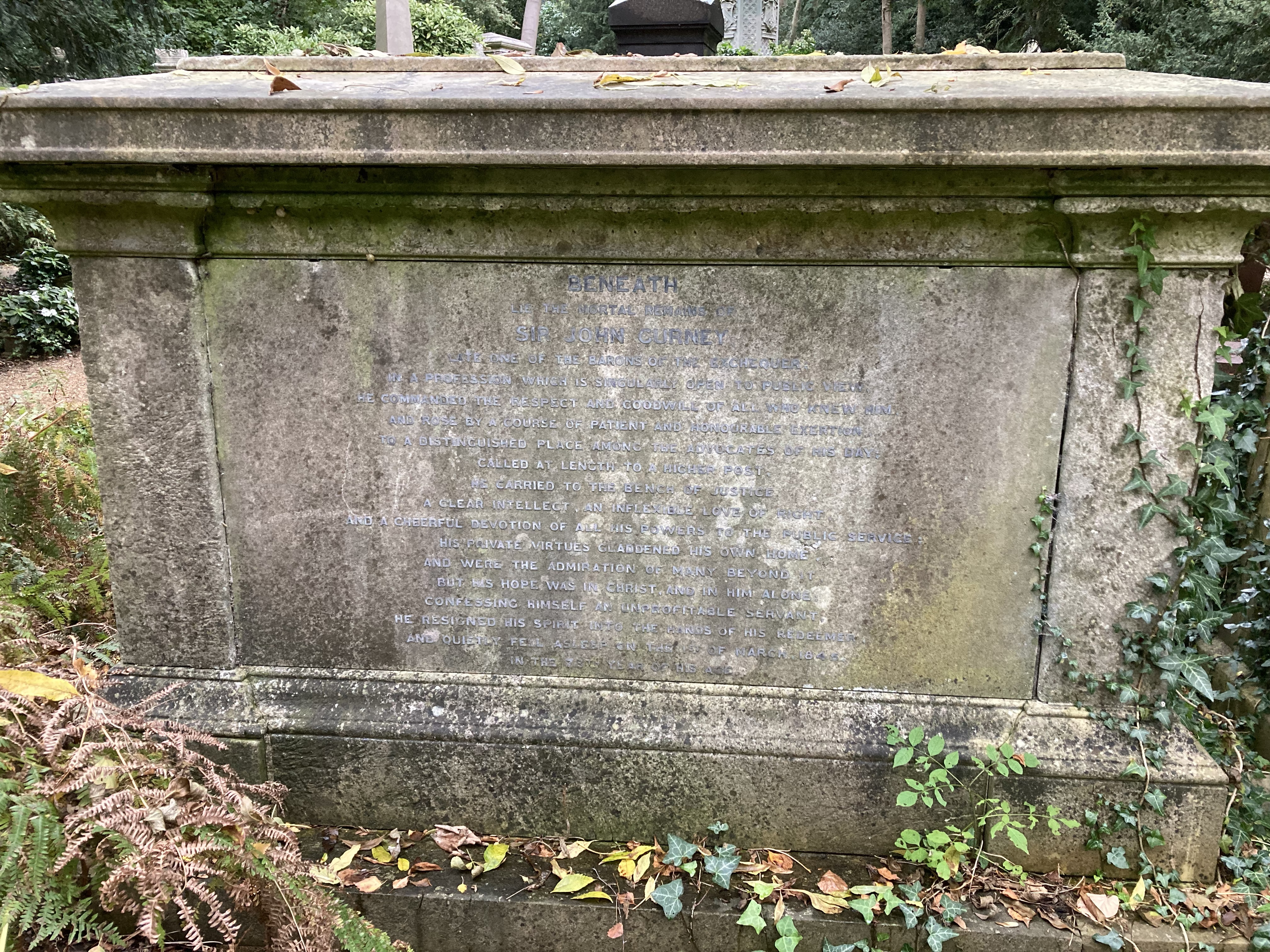
Gurney family vault in Highgate Cemetery

Born the son of Sir John Gurney, Baron of the Exchequer in Serjeant's Inn, Fleet Street, London, England, he was educated in Chobham, Surrey and at Trinity College, Cambridge, where he graduated B.A. as 3rd classic in 1824 and became M.A. in 1827.

He was an active supporter of the Society for Promoting Christian Knowledge and other religious societies.

He died in London in 1862 and was buried in the Gurney family vault on the west side of Highgate Cemetery.

There is both a short street close to Marble Arch and a primary school nearby in Nutford Place named after him (Hampden Gurney C of E primary school).

== Service ==
- Curate of St Mary's Church, Lutterworth (1824–1844) (Listed as Stipendiary Curate, 1827)
- Rector of St Mary's, Marylebone
- Prebendary of St Paul's Cathedral.

== Published writings ==
- Church Psalmody: Hints for the Improvement of a Collection of Hymns (1853)
- A Collection of Hymns for Public Worship (1838), known as the Lutterworth Collection
- Psalms and Hymns for Public Worship, Selected for Some of the Churches of Marylebone (1851) known as his Marlybone collection.

== Selected hymns ==
His hymns include: We saw Thee not when Thou didst come, Lord, as to thy dear Cross we flee, and Yes, God is good.
