= Andrew Jukes (theologian) =

English theologian (1815–1901)

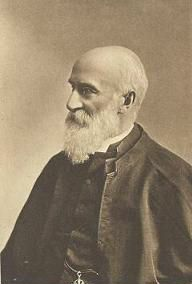
Andrew Jukes

Andrew John Jukes (5 November 1815 in Bombay – 4 July 1901 in Southampton) was an English theologian.

== Background ==
The son of Andrew Jukes and his wife Georgina Ewart, he was educated at Harrow School and Trinity College, Cambridge.

== Career ==
He was initially a curate in the Church of England at St. John's Church, Hull, but became convinced of Baptist teaching and underwent adult baptism at the George Street Chapel, Hull, on 31 August 1843. After leaving the Church of England, he joined the Plymouth Brethren.

Jukes later left the Plymouth Brethren and founded an independent chapel in Hull. Among those influenced by Jukes was Hudson Taylor.

== Works ==
- Types in Genesis - Adam, Cain and Abel, Noah, Abraham, Isaac, Jacob, Joseph.
- The Characteristic Differences of the Four Gospels
- The Names of God
- The Law of the Offerings - on Leviticus
- (The Second Death and the) Restitution of All Things - arguments for universal salvation after resurrection
- The Mystery of the Kingdom - typology in I and II Kings. Part 1.
- The New Man and the Eternal Life
- Catholic Eschatology Examined - A Reply to the Rev. H. N. Oxenham
- The Way Which Some Call Heresy - against infant baptism in the Book of Common Prayer
- The Church of Christ
- The Drying up of the Euphrates, and the Kings of the East - against an identification with the Ottoman Empire.
- Try the Spirits - a defence of the Trinity
- Letters of Andrew Jukes - edited by Herbert H. Jeaffreson 1903
- A Letter to a Friend on Baptism
- Pharisaism & Self-Sacrifice: Being Some Thoughts on Schism and its Remedy
