= Gurney (surname) =

Gurney is an English surname of Anglo-Norman origin.

== Notable families ==
- The Gurney family (Norwich), Quakers in England that established Gurney's bank:
  - Anna Gurney (1795–1857), Old English scholar
  - Catherine Gurney (1848–1930), English activist
  - Daniel Gurney (1791–1880), banker and antiquary
  - Elizabeth Fry née Gurney (1780–1845), prison reformer and philanthropist
  - Hudson Gurney (1775–1864), English antiquary, verse-writer, and politician
  - Isabel Charlotte Gurney (Isabel Talbot, Baroness Talbot de Malahide) (1851–1932), English philanthropist
  - John Henry Gurney Sr. (1819–1890), banker and amateur ornithologist, son of Joseph John Gurney
  - Joseph John Gurney (1788–1847), banker, brother of Elizabeth Fry and father of John Henry Gurney
  - Robert Gurney (1879–1950), English zoologist
  - Samuel Gurney (1786–1856), banker and philanthropist
- English shorthand pioneers:
  - Thomas Gurney (shorthand writer) (1705–1770), first known official shorthand writer
  - Sir John Gurney (judge) (1768–1845), barrister and judge
  - William Brodie Gurney (1777–1855), shorthand writer and philanthropist
  - Joseph Gurney (1804–1879), British shorthand writer and biblical scholar
- English clergymen and civil servants (related to the banking family):
  - Archer Thompson Gurney (1820–1887), Church of England clergyman and hymn writer
  - John Hampden Gurney (1802–1862), Anglican clergyman and hymnist
  - Richard Gurney (1790–1843), vice-warden of the stannaries, and father of Archer Thompson Gurney
  - Edmund Gurney (divine) (d.1648), English clergyman, divine and anti-Catholic writer
  - Russell Gurney (1804–1878), English Conservative Party politician
- American professional auto racing drivers:
  - Dan Gurney (1931–2018), father of Alex Gurney
  - Alex Gurney (born 1974), son of Dan Gurney

== Others with this surname ==
- A. R. Gurney (1930–2017), American playwright and novelist
- Alison Gurney (born 1957), Scottish pharmacologist
- Andy Gurney (b. 1974), English footballer
- Alexander George Gurney (1902–1955), Australian cartoonist and comic strip creator
- Bobby Gurney (1907–1994), English football player
- Charles Raymond Gurney (1906–1942), Australian aviator
- Charles W. Gurney (1840–1913), American businessman
- Daryl Gurney (b. 1986), Northern Irish darts player
- Edmund Gurney (1847–1888), English psychologist and psychic researcher.
- Edward Gurney (1868–1938), English cricketer who played for Gloucestershire
- Edward J. Gurney (1914–1996), U.S. Representative and Senator from Florida
- Eric Gurney (1910–1992), Canadian cartoonist who worked with the Walt Disney Company
- Sir Goldsworthy Gurney (1793–1875), British scientist
- Harry Gurney (b. 1986), English cricketer
- Sir Henry Gurney (Henry Lovell Goldsworthy Gurney) (1898–1951), British High Commissioner in Malaya
- Ivor Gurney (1890–1937), English composer and war poet
- James Gurney (born 1958), U.S. artist best known as the creator and illustrator of the Dinotopia books
- Jason Gurney (1910–1973), British sculptor who fought in the Spanish Civil War
- Jeremiah Gurney (1812–1886), American daguerreotype photographer
- John Chandler Gurney (1896–1985), U.S. Senator from South Dakota
- Margaret Gurney (1908–2002), American mathematician, statistician, and computer programmer
- Margaret Gurney (artist) (b.1943), Australian artist
- Oliver Gurney (1911–2001), English assyriologist and hittitologist
- Peter Gurney (1938–2006), English guinea pig campaigner
- Rachel Gurney (1920–2001), English actor
- Sir Richard Gurney (d.1647), 1st Baronet, English merchant, Lord Mayor of London
- Robert Edward Gurney (born 1939), British writer
- Ronald Wilfred Gurney (1898–1953), British theoretical physicist
- Scott Gurney (b. 1976), American actor and executive producer
- Stan Gurney (1908–1942), Australian recipient of the Victoria Cross
- Steve Gurney (b. 1963), New Zealand multisport and triathlon athlete

== In fiction ==
- Gladys Gurney, a member of the extended Simpson family in The Simpsons
- Jack Arnold Alexander Tancred Gurney, protagonist of Peter Barnes' 1968 play, The Ruling Class.
- Gurney Halleck, character from Dune
