= List of people from St Albans =

A list of people from St Albans, Hertfordshire, England.

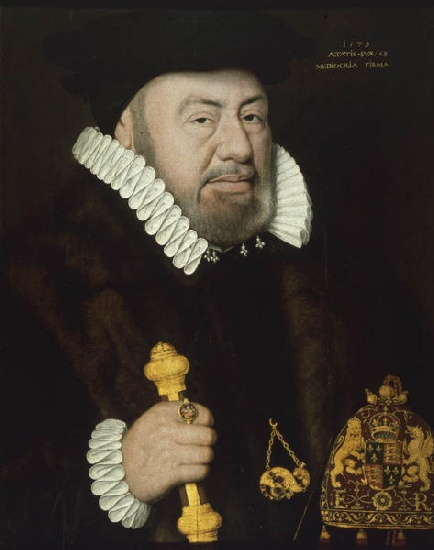
Nicholas Bacon (1510–1579)

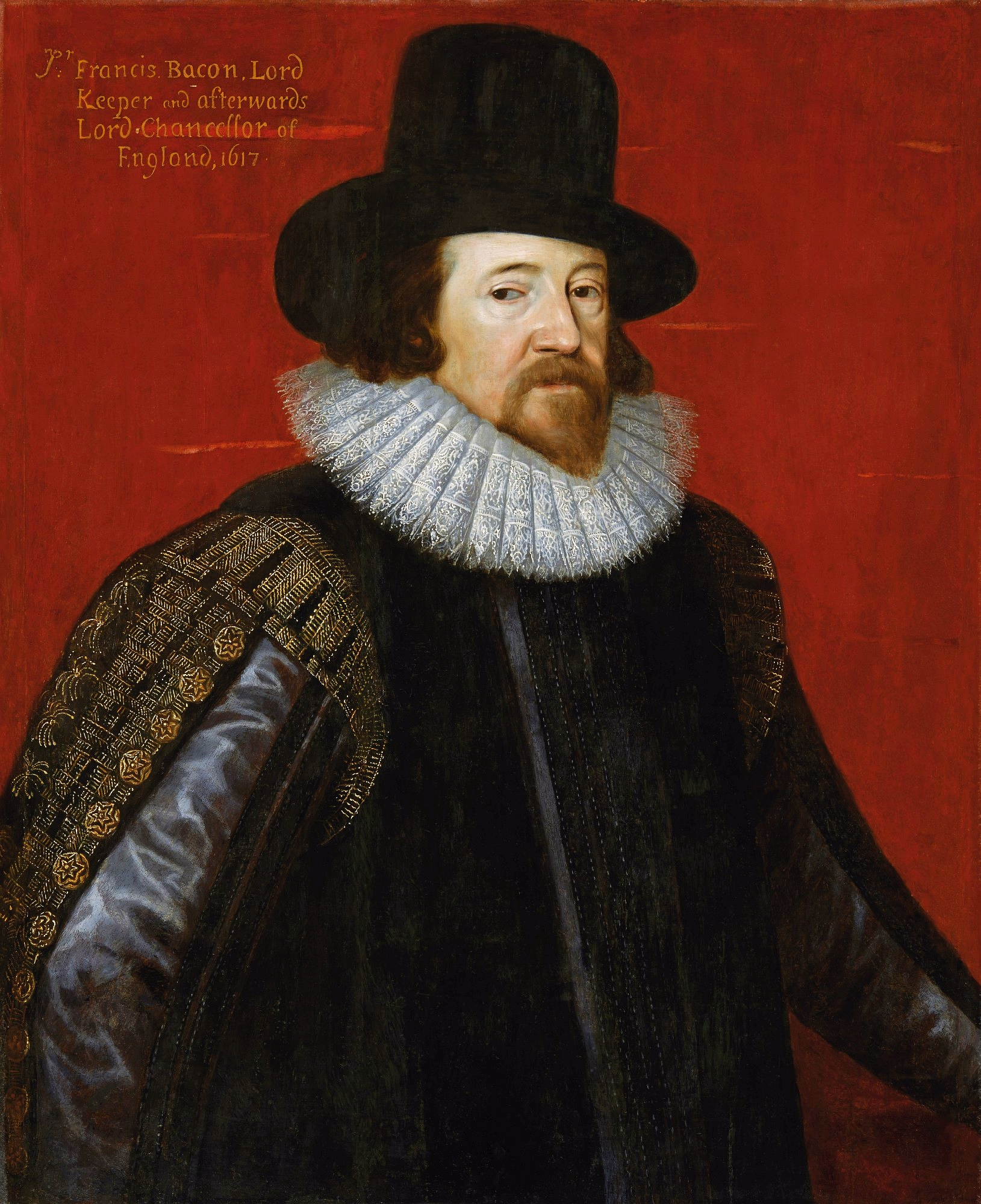
Francis Bacon (1561–1626)

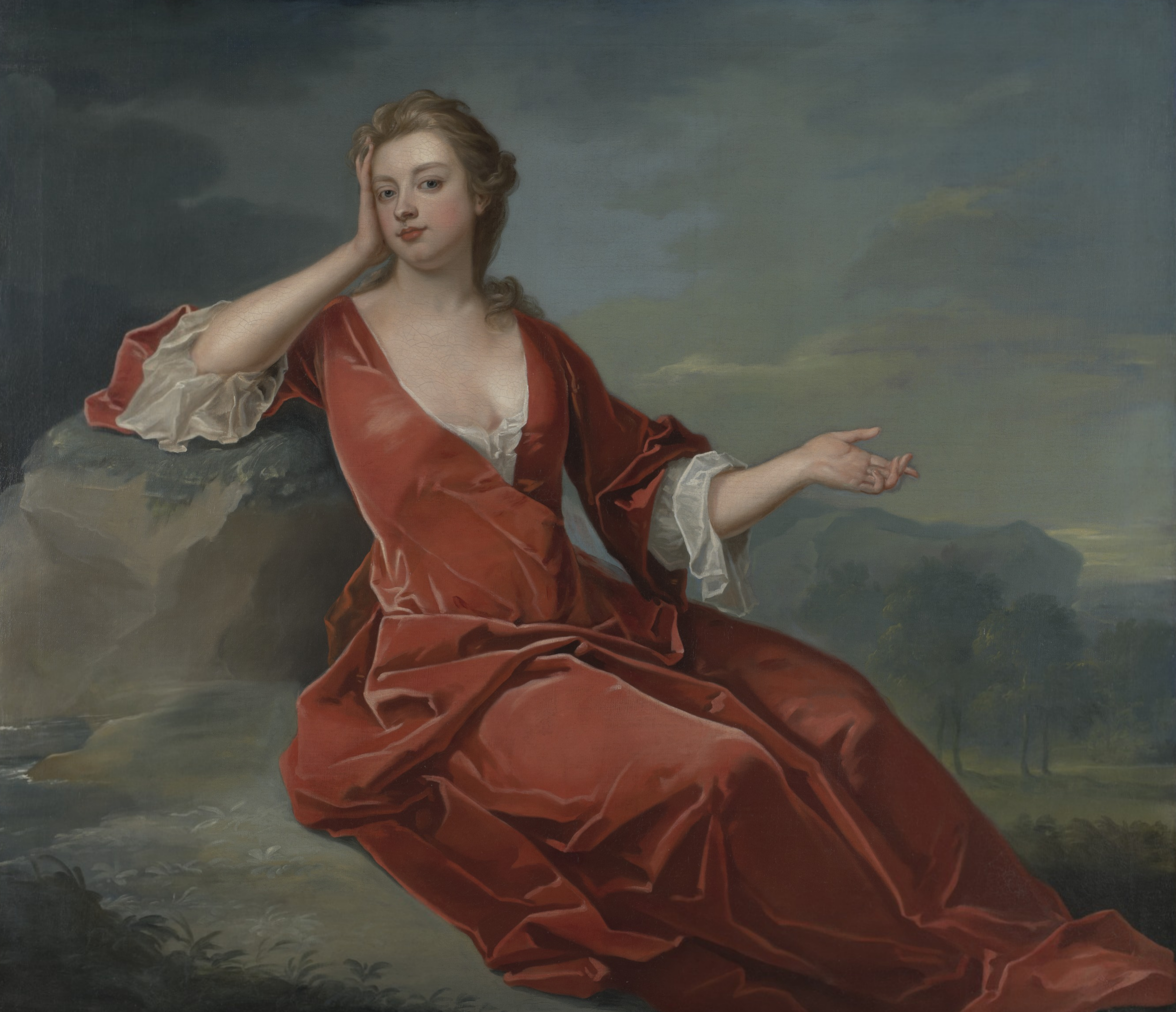
Sarah, Duchess of Marlborough (1660–1744)

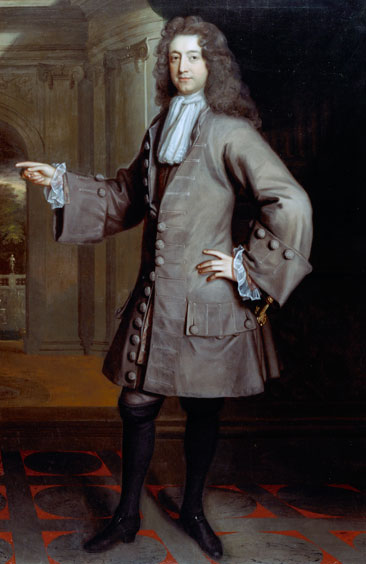
William, Earl Cowper (1665–1723)

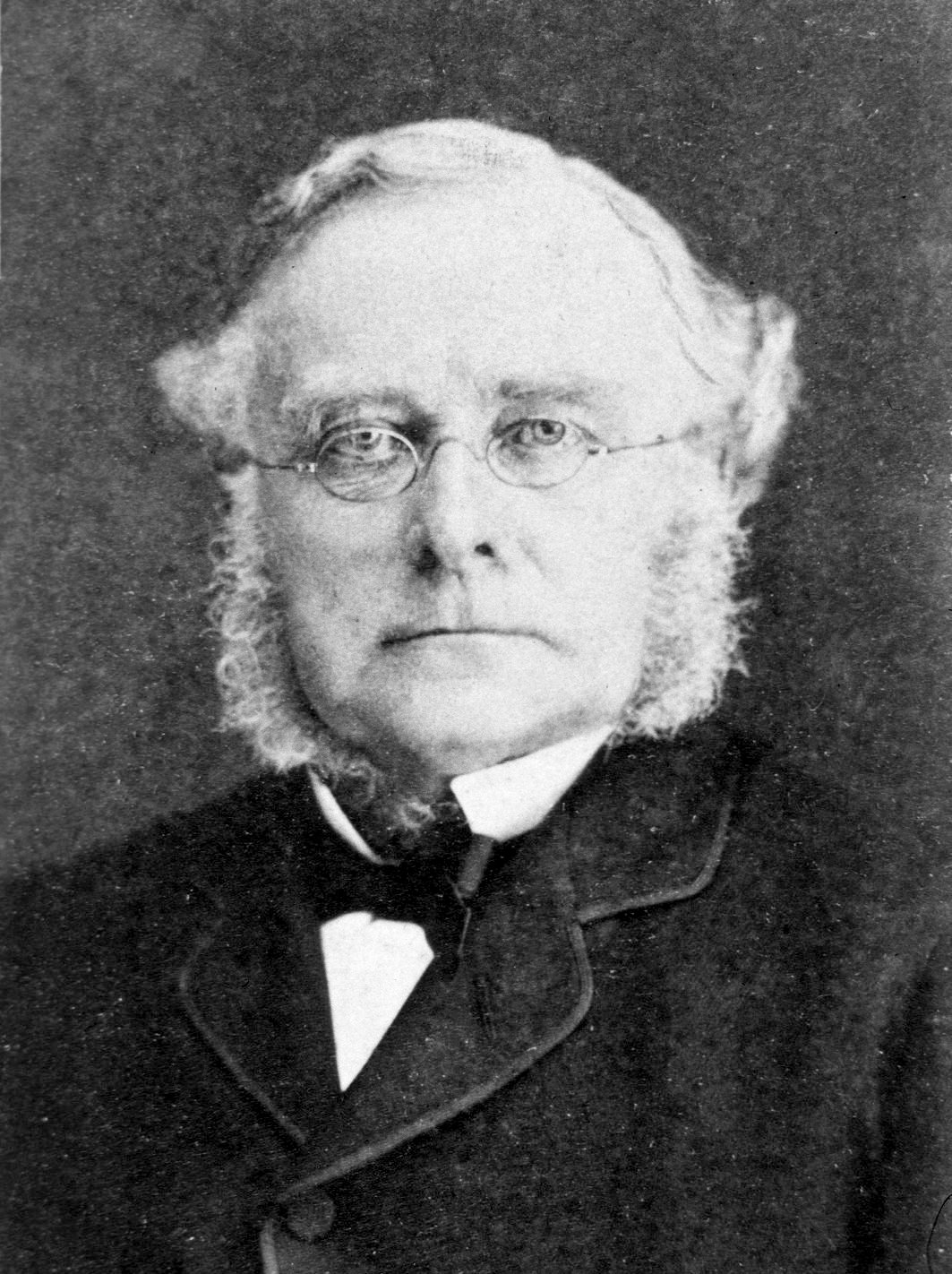
Thomas S. Wells (1818–1897)

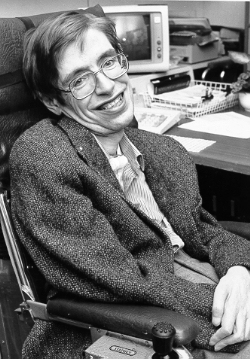
Stephen Hawking (1942–2018)

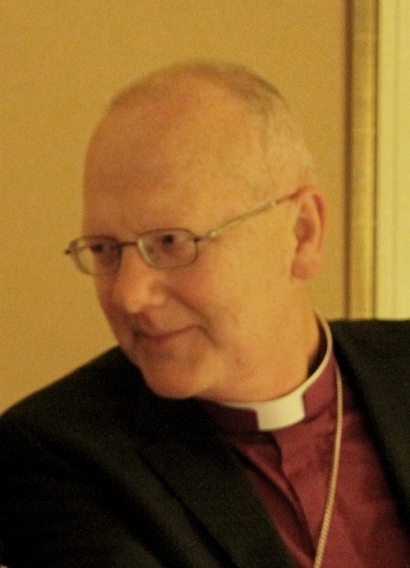
Alan Smith (b. 1957)

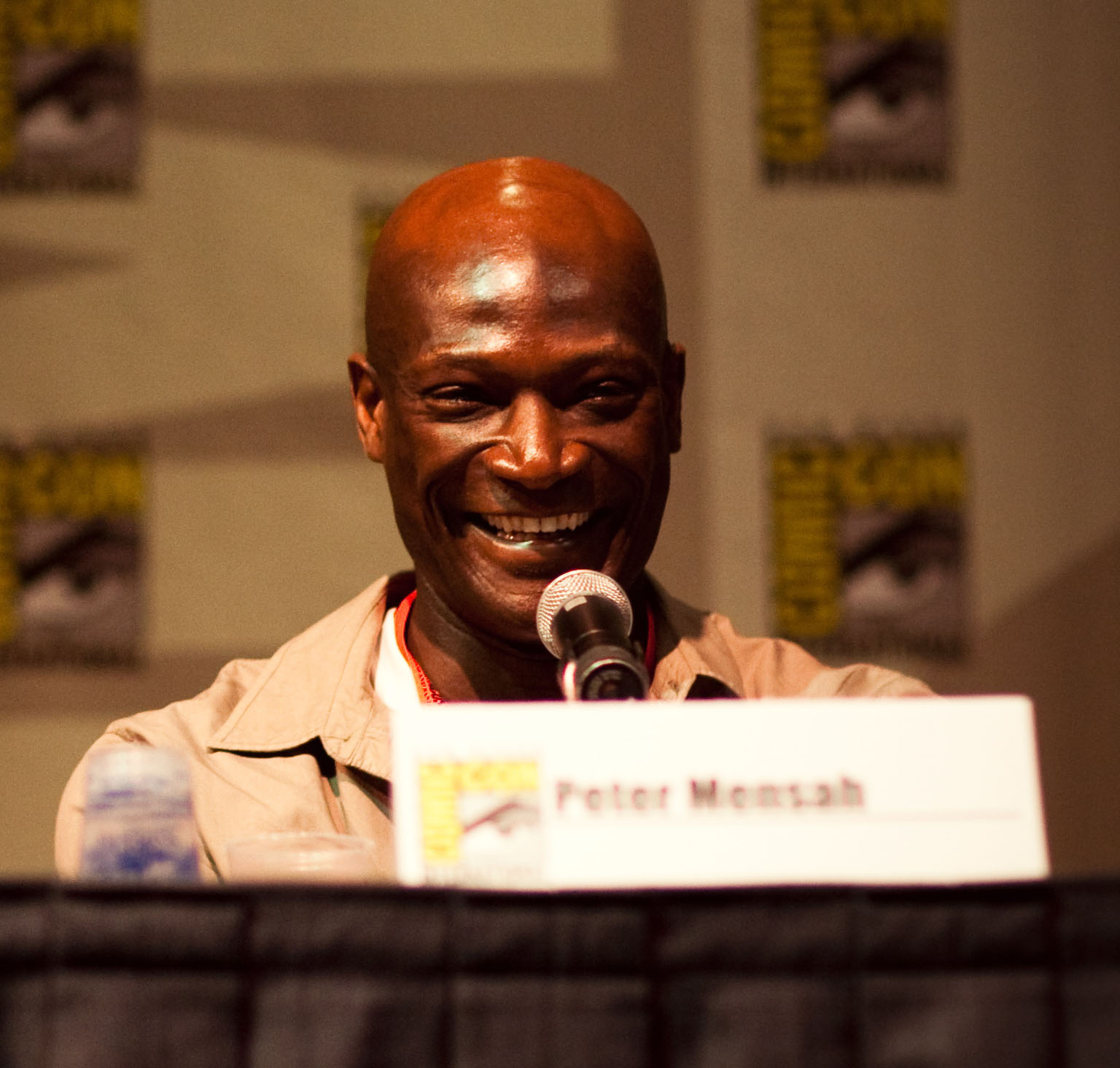
Peter Mensah (b. 1959)

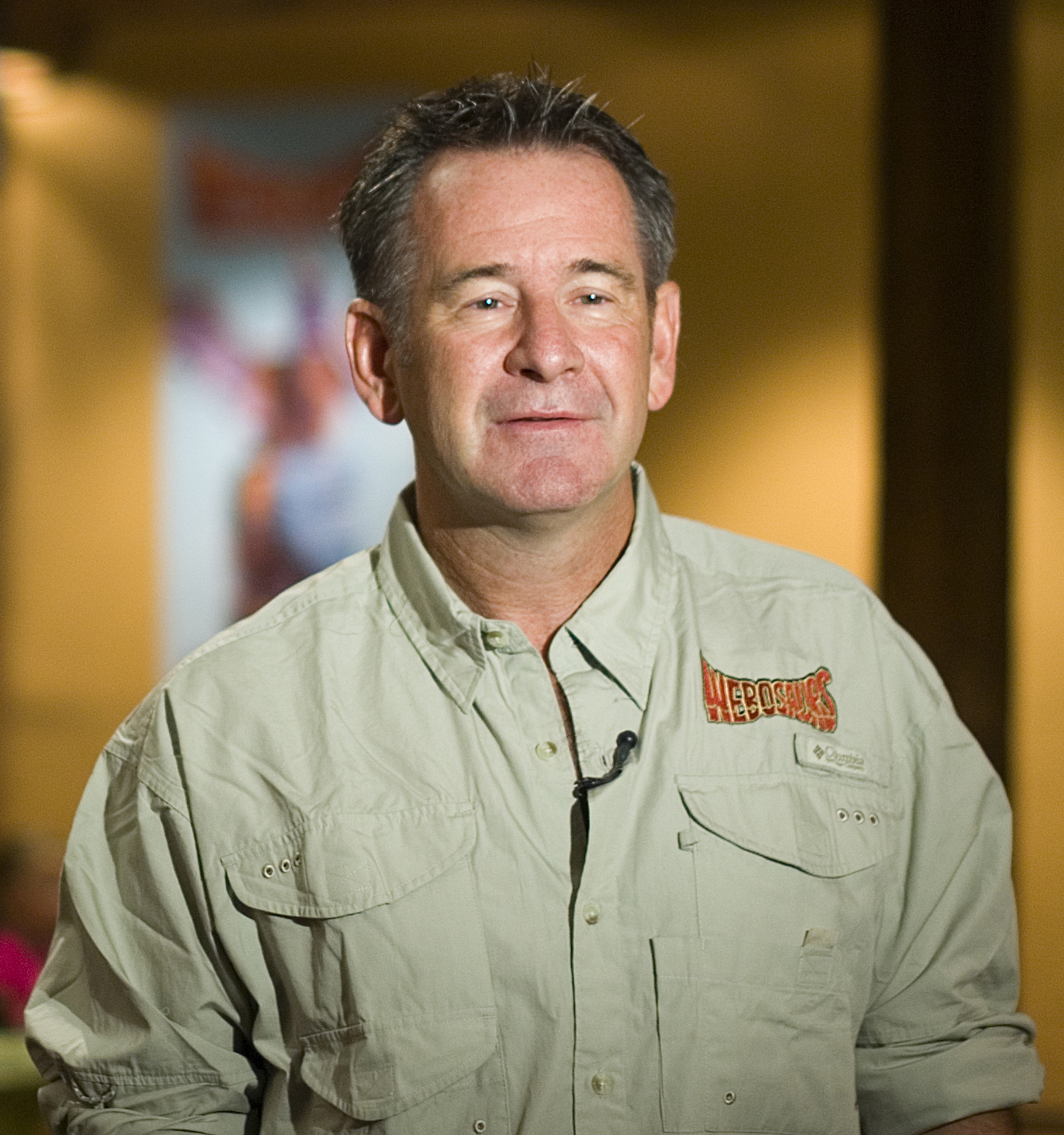
Nigel Marven (b. 1960)

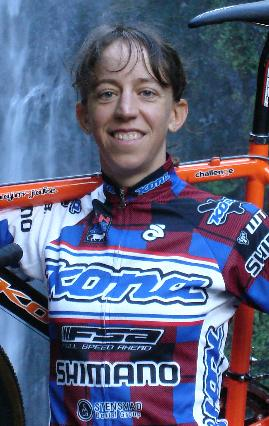
Helen Wyman (b. 1980)

- Robert of St. Albans, an English crusader and later a Muslim Ayyubid soldier.
- The St Albans printer, an anonymous printer who produced eight works, the first six in Latin, the last two in English between 1480 and 1486. The most important and last of these was the famous 'Boke of St Albans'
- Olivia Allison (b. 1990), GB synchronised swimmer, attended St Albans Girls' School
- Rod Argent (b. 1945), musician and songwriter with the group The Zombies, formed while the members (Colin Blunstone, Chris White, Paul Atkinson, Hugh Grundy, and Paul Arnold) were at school in St Albans
- Francis Bacon (1561–1626), philosopher, scientist and statesman, lived at Old Gorhambury House. Bacon was made Viscount St Albans in 1618.
- Nicholas Bacon (1509–1579), Lord Keeper of the Great Seal under Queen Elizabeth I and father of Francis Bacon built Old Gorhambury House
- John Ball (c. 1338–1381), Lollard priest, played prominent part in the English Peasants' Revolt of 1381.
- Edmund Beckett, 1st Baron Grimthorpe (1816–1905), lawyer, amateur horologist, and architect; best known locally for rebuilding the west front of St Albans Cathedral in 1880–1885 at his own expense, but also designed the clock movement for Big Ben. He lived at Batchwood Hall.
- William Henry Bell (1873–1946), musician, composer and first director of the South African College of Music
- Steve Blinkhorn (b. 1949), occupational psychologist, has lived in St Albans for many years
- Nicholas Breakspear (c.1100–1159), later Pope Adrian IV, born in Abbots Langley, attended school in St Albans
- Jez Butterworth (b. 1969), writer, attended Verulam School
- Nathan Byrne (b. 1992), footballer, born in St Albans
- Cheryl Campbell (b. 1949), actor
- Steph Catley (b. 1994), footballer, daytime TV star
- Paul Cattermole (1977–2023), former member of S Club 7, was born in St Albans
- Julia Childs (1962), playwright and director
- Ralph Chubb (1892–1960), lithographer
- Sarah Churchill, Duchess of Marlborough (1660–1744), wife of John Churchill, 1st Duke of Marlborough and close friend of Queen Anne, was born in St Albans
- Chris Clark (b. 1979), electronic musician, attended school in St Albans
- Steve Collins (b. 1964), former boxer
- Sally Connolly (b. 1976), author and academic, attended St Albans School
- William Cowper, 1st Earl Cowper (c. 1665–1723), Lord Chancellor of England.
- Dark Stares, rock band, all members born in St Albans
- Christopher Debenham (b.1953), cricketer
- Joanna Dennehy, serial killer
- Anouk Denton (b. 2003), footballer
- Donovan, (b. 1946), Songwriter and folk singer lived in St Albans during the 1960s
- Stacey Dooley (b. 1987), television presenter, lives in St Albans
- Tom Dyckhoff (b. 1971), architecture critic and TV presenter, was born in St Albans
- Enter Shikari, post-hardcore band, all members born and raised in St Albans
- David Essex (b. 1947), singer, lives in St Albans
- Siobhan Fahey (b. 1957), singer from Bananarama and Shakespear's Sister, attended Loreto College
- Robert Fayrfax (1464–1521), composer and musician, worked in St Albans Abbey where he is buried
- Friendly Fires, indie pop band from St Albans
- Bruce Forsyth (1928–2017) lived in a house called Forsythier in Admirals Walk until 1958.
- Nick Gentry (b. 1980), portrait artist, attended school in St Albans
- Nigel Gibbs (b. 1965), former Watford footballer, was born in St Albans
- Russell Green (b. 1959), cricketer
- Robert Edward Gurney (b. 1939), writer
- Willis Hall (1929–2005), playwright and TV scriptwriter, lived in St Albans for many years and was for a while president of St Albans City F.C.
- Tommy Hampson (1907–1965), athlete, Olympic gold medal winner and world record holder, taught at St Albans School
- Tim Hart (1948–2009), musician and former guitarist in Steeleye Span, lived in St Albans and attended St Albans School
- John Hartson (b. 1975), footballer, lived in St Albans
- Stephen Hawking (1942–2018), theoretical physicist, educated at St Albans School
- Nick Helm (b. 1980), Actor, comedian and musician, born in St Albans and attended Cunningham Hill School and Sandringham School.
- Christopher Herbert (b. 1944), 9th Bishop of St Albans 1995–2009
- Jimmy Hill (1928–2015), TV presenter and football personality, lived in St Albans
- Ian Holloway (b. 1963), Millwall F.C manager, lived in St Albans
- Matthew Holness, comedian, better known as Garth Marenghi, lives in St Albans
- Edward Robert Hughes (1851–1914), artist, lived and died in St Albans. He is buried in Hatfield Road cemetery
- Kurt Jackson, artist, lived in St Albans and attended Francis Bacon School as a teenager
- Jeffrey John (b. 1953), Dean of St Albans since 2004
- John of St Giles (c. 1180 – 1259–60; fl. 1230), Dominican friar and physician
- Minhyong Kim, mathematician, lives in St Albans
- Stanley Kubrick (1928–1999), film director, lived at Childwickbury Manor from 1978 until his death
- Adam Lallana (b. 1988), footballer, born in St Albans
- Stephen Lander (b. 1947), former head of MI5, has lived in St Albans for many years
- Mark Lawson (b. 1962), broadcaster and columnist for The Guardian, attended St Columba's College
- Christopher Lewis (b. 1944), Dean of St Albans 1994–2003
- John Mandeville (14th century), compiler of a singular book of supposed travels, reputedly born in St Albans
- Rosie Marcel (b. 1977), actor, Jac Naylor in BBC One's Holby City, lives in St Albans
- Nigel Marven, television wildlife presenter, was brought up in St Albans and attended Francis Bacon School
- Maximum Love, electronic music duo from St Albans
- Arthur Melbourne-Cooper (1874–1961), pioneering film-maker, born in St Albans
- Peter Mensah (b. 1959), actor, Oenomaus in the TV series Spartacus, grew up in St Albans
- Michael Morpurgo (b. 1943), author, born in St Albans
- Albert Moses (1937–2017), actor, Mind Your Language, producer and director, lived in St Albans
- John Motson (1945–2023), football commentator, lived in St Albans
- Herbert Mundin (1898–1939), character actor, lived in St Albans from a young age and was educated at St Albans School
- David Munrow,(1942–1976), a noted pioneer of Early music, lived in St Albans
- Alexander Neckam (1157–1217), an English magnetician, poet, theologian, and writer.
- Mike Newell (b. 1942), film director, lived in St Albans and attended St Albans School
- Ardal O'Hanlon (b. 1965), Father Ted star and stand-up comedian, lives in St Albans
- Eleanor Ormerod (1828–1901), entomologist, lived and died in St Albans.
- William Page (1861–1934), historian and editor, lived here 1896–1904 and took part in archaeological excavations in the city
- Matthew Paris (c.1200–1259), Benedictine monk, chronicler of the history of St Albans Abbey.
- Rupert Parkes (b. 1972) a.k.a. Photek, record producer and DJ, was born in St Albans
- Julian Perretta (b. 1989), singer-songwriter
- Allan Prior (1922–2006), TV scriptwriter, co-creator of Z-Cars, and father of Maddy Prior (b. 1947), lived in St Albans
- Chris Read (b. 1978), England cricketer, lives in St Albans
- Tim Rice (b. 1944), lyricist, attended St Albans School
- Ben Richards (b. 1972), actor, singer, Footballers' Wives, The Bill, lives in St Albans
- Luke Roberts (b. 1977), actor, Holby City, lives in St Albans
- Jim Rodford (1941–2018), musician, member of Argent, The Zombies and The Kinks and cousin of Rod Argent
- Henry Rogers (1806–1877), nonconformist minister and man of letters.
- James Runcie, author and film maker, lives in St Albans
- Robert Runcie (1921–2000), Bishop of St Albans 1970–1980, later Archbishop of Canterbury 1980–1991. Now buried in the grounds of St Albans Cathedral
- John D. Rutherford (b. 1941), Hispanist, born in St Albans
- Samuel Ryder (1858–1936), seed merchant, founder of the Ryder Cup
- George Gilbert Scott (1811–1878), architect, restored St Albans Abbey 1856–1877.
- John Sessions (1953–2020), actor and comedian, attended St Albans Boys' Grammar School (now Verulam School), patron of St Albans Arts
- James Shirley (1596-1666), poet and playwright, lived for a while in St Albans, first as a Church of England minister, and then as Master of St Albans School
- Gilberto Silva (b. 1976), Brazilian footballer, played for Arsenal FC and lived in St Albans
- Clive Sinclair (1948–2018), author, lived in St Albans
- Alan Smith (b. 1957), Bishop of St Albans since 2009
- Justin Somper, author, born in St Albans
- Source Direct, drum and bass act. Both original members were born and schooled in St Albans.
- Jonathan Stroud (b. 1970), author, lived in St Albans
- Trash Boat, pop-punk band from St Albans
- John Turner (1864–1949), Australian naval officer
- Ulsinus (fl. 10th century), Abbot of St Albans Abbey, reputed founder in 948 of St Albans School, and St Michael's, St Peter's and St Stephen's churches
- Mike Walling (b. 1950), comedy actor and scriptwriter, lived in St Albans 1997–2010
- Richard of Wallingford (1292–1336), Abbot of St Albans Abbey, mathematician, horologist and astronomer
- Private Edward Warner (1883–1915), soldier in the Bedfordshire Regiment, awarded a posthumous Victoria Cross for his actions during the Battle of Hill 60
- Thomas Spencer Wells (1818–1897), surgeon to Queen Victoria and president of the Royal College of Surgeons of England, born and educated in St Albans.
- Charles Williams (1886–1945), writer and publisher, lived in St Albans 1894–1917 and attended St Albans School
- Helen Wyman (b. 1981), cyclist, seven times British cyclo-cross champion, 2012 European cyclo-cross champion; born in St Albans
