= Richard Patch =

English murderer

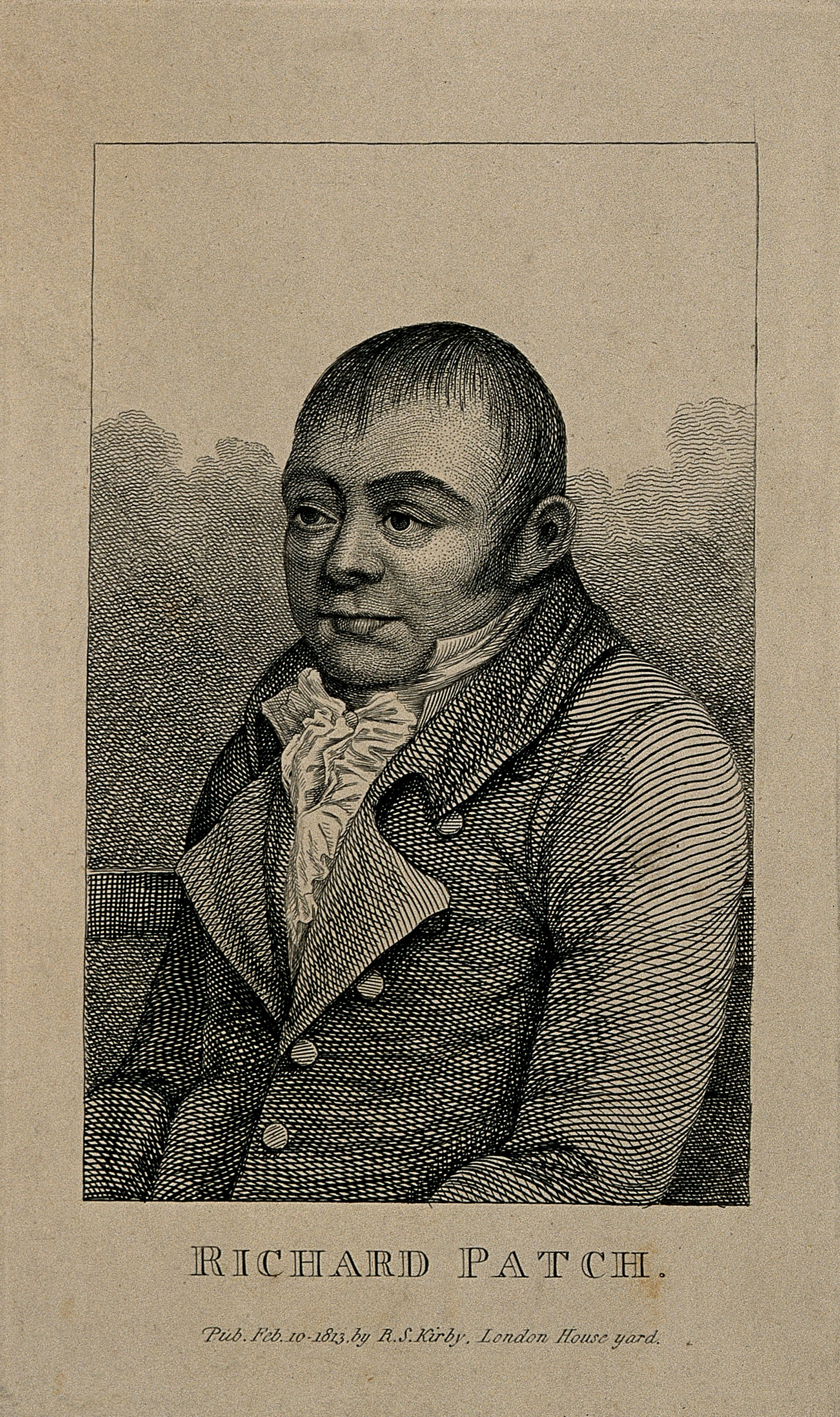
- Born: c. 1770; Heavitree, England
- Died: 8 April 1806
- Occupation: Farmer

Richard Patch (c. 1770 – 8 April 1806) was an English murderer.

== Biography ==
Patch was born about 1770 in Heavitree, near Exeter, Devonshire. He was the eldest son of a small farmer who for some daring acts of smuggling was imprisoned in Exeter gaol, where he afterwards became turnkey. Richard Patch was apprenticed to a butcher, and was liberally supplied with money by his father. On his father's death he inherited a small freehold estate of about 50l. a year, which he farmed, renting at the same time a small farm in the neighbourhood of Heavitree. In this occupation he was engaged for some years; but he was compelled to mortgage his estate, and in the spring of 1803 journeyed to London to avoid, according to his own account, an action for the non-payment of tithes. He was taken into the service of Isaac Blight, a ship-breaker living in the parish of St. Mary, Rotherhithe. In the summer of 1803 Blight, in order to protect himself against his creditors, appears to have executed an instrument conveying his property to Patch. In August 1805 it was arranged that Patch should become a real, instead of a nominal, partner in Blight's business to the extent of one-third. For this share Patch paid Blight 250l., procured from the sale of his estate in Devonshire, and promised him, by 23 September 1805, 1,000l., a sum that Patch knew he had no means of obtaining. On the evening of the 23rd Patch was alone with Blight in the front parlour of the latter's house, and about 8 P.M., just after Patch had been seen to leave the room, Blight was discovered by a servant lying wounded by a pistol-shot. Blight died the next day, and Patch was tried for his murder on 5 April 1806, at the Sessions House in Horsemonger Lane, before Lord-chief-baron Macdonald. The prisoner, who appeared dressed "in a handsome suit of black," behaved with the utmost coolness, and read a written defence. He was found guilty on clear circumstantial evidence, skillfully marshalled by the prosecution. Patch was deeply affected when visited in prison by his brother and by the sister of his deceased wife, but does not appear to have confessed the murder. He was executed on 8 April 1806 at nine o'clock, on a platform on the front of the Horsemonger Lane Gaol. A man and his wife were at the same time hanged for coining.

The case excited great interest, and numerous accounts of the trial were published, among which were shorthand reports by Joseph & William Brodie Gurney, and by Blanchard & Ramsey (London, 1806, 8vo). A view and plan of Blight's house appeared in The Lady's Magazine for 1806, pp. 211–16. Fairburn's edition of the trial and an account published in vol. iv. of Kirby's "Wonderful and Eccentric Museum" (pp. 43–97) contain portraits of Patch, who is described (Gent. Mag. 1806, p. 375, paged "383") as a man of heavy build, "very round-shouldered, with a short thick neck and florid complexion."
