= Gurey =

Gurey is both a given name and a surname. Notable people with the name include:

- Adan Ali Gurey, Dhulbahante monarch and commander of Golaweyne
- Ahmed Gurey (1506–1543), general of Adal kingdom
- Aadan-Gurey Maxamed Cabdille (1840–1920), Somali poet

== See also ==
- Gurney (surname)
