= Martha Gurney =

English printer, bookseller, publisher and abolitionist activist

Martha Gurney (1733–1816) was an English printer, bookseller and publisher, known as an abolitionist activist.

== Life ==
The daughter of Thomas Gurney, she had Joseph Gurney as brother, and it was the memoirs of Joseph's son William Brodie Gurney that preserved details of Martha Gurney's life. In 1785 she joined the Maze Pond Particular Baptist congregation.

== Publications ==
One type of publication with which Martha Gurney made a success was transcripts of trials. Her brother Joseph being a shorthand writer, she in partnership with him, from 1773, produced a long series of trial books. Her business was in the Temple Bar area of London, moving later to Holborn. She also published sermons, for example those of James Dore, her minister at Maze Pond. In the years 1788 to 1794 she was at her most active in producing pamphlets.

In 1794, Gurney joined other radical publishers (Daniel Isaac Eaton, Joseph Johnson, James Ridgway and Robert Westley) in producing a new edition of Benjamin Franklin's Information to Those who would Remove to America. This pamphlet from 1784, encouraging British emigration to the new United States of America, was still in the 1790s considered subversive by the British authorities, and more generally.

In Baptist abolitionist publishing, Gurney's collaboration with William Fox was prominent, with the productions of other figures such as William Button, and John Marsom. Fox's pamphlet of the early 1790s against sugar and rum from the triangular trade was published and promoted by Gurney, and sold eventually hundreds of thousands of copies, in 26 editions.

Gurney's significance was highlighted by Michael F. Suarez in his A.S.W. Rosenbach Lectures in Bibliography, "Printing Abolition: How the Fight to Ban the British Slave Trade Was Won, 1783–1807."

== See also ==
- List of women printers and publishers before 1800
