= John Angell (shorthand writer) =

John Angell (fl. 1758), was an Irish professional shorthand writer. Angell was from Dublin, and professor of the art there.

== Works ==
Angell published in 1758 Stenography, or Shorthand Improved; being the most compendious, lineal, and easy method hitherto extant. ... By John Angell, who has practised his art above 30 years, London, 1758. It contained a historical preface; it was commonly ascribed to Samuel Johnson, though it had no trace of his style, and borrowed from the work of Philip Gibbs. Angell on one occasion visited Johnson, who was not favourably impressed with his abilities as a reporter. ‘Mr. Samuel Johnson, A.M., London,’ was a subscriber to Angell's work.

It was favourably commended to the public in 1770, by the Dublin Society, presided over by the lord-lieutenant. There was a second edition in 1782, sold by M. Angell in Lincoln's Inn Passage, London; and the method reached a fourth edition (without date), sold by the same publisher. Angell's shorthand, based on the lines more successfully followed up by Thomas Gurney, was never very popular. It is a variation of the system of William Mason.

Angell was also the author of an Essay on Prayer (London, 1761), with specimens of prayers of several eminent dissenting ministers in London, taken by the editor in shorthand.
