= Joseph Gurney (shorthand writer) =

British writer and activist

Joseph Gurney (1744–1815) was an English shorthand-writer and evangelical activist.

== Life ==
The son of Thomas Gurney, he was his assistant and successor as a shorthand-writer in law courts and parliament. Before that, he spent a period as a bookseller, and was in business with his sister Martha Gurney. Martha Gurney was a Baptist and abolitionist, active in the production of pamphlet literature. Gurney also associated with the radical William Fox, and was a friend of William Hawes.

Gurney was employed officially after 1790 to report civil cases in courts of law. In 1786 he attended as a reporter to some slave-trade inquiries in the House of Lords. Recognised as a leading figure in his field, Gurney once commented that, of all speakers, he had most difficulty in transcribing the words of Samuel Taylor Coleridge. The reason was that it was difficult to anticipate how sentences would come to an end.

At the Warren Hastings trial, Gurney acted as shorthand writer for the government; William Isaac Blanchard did so for the defence. The stenographic world was small, and Blanchard had previously been Gurney's assistant. Indeed, by the 1780s newspaper reporting was undermining the business model of commercial court reporters. In May 1789 the House of Commons called on Gurney to read, from his notes Edmund Burke's words accusing Sir Elijah Impey of murder; and a vote of censure on Burke was then passed. According to Thompson Cooper, writing in the Dictionary of National Biography, this incident was the first public acknowledgment of the verbal accuracy of shorthand.

In 1791 the House of Commons first used shorthand for reporting the proceedings of one of its committees on the Eau-Brink Drainage Bill. In the same year, Gurney took notes of six election petition committees. In 1802 an act was passed authorizing the regular use of shorthand in election committees; and in the following year, a select committee of the House of Commons having reported positively, it was generally applied to other committees.

== Works ==
Gurney edited the ninth edition of his father Thomas Gurney's Brachygraphy in 1778. While Thomas Gurney had adopted the system of William Mason, his son as editor dropped mention of Mason's name.

Gurney was known for printed reports of major contemporary trials from his official shorthand notes. An early example was from 1770, of the libel case brought by George Onslow against John Horne Tooke. By 1773, with the trial of John Mostyn, he was publishing reports as books. There were around 40 of those, and Gurney employed clerks to transcribe for him. The reports included:

- The trial (at large) of the Rev. Henry Bate, with the previous proceedings, upon an information exhibited against him by His Grace the Duke of Richmond, for a libel (1780)
- The Trial of George Gordon, Esquire, commonly called Lord George Gordon (1781 or 1782)
- The Whole Proceedings on the Trial of the Hon. Major Henry Fitzroy Stanhope: At a Court Martial Held at the Horse Guards, in the Month of June 1783.
- The Sentence of the Court-martial... for the Trial of the Hon. Lieut. Gen. James Murray, Late Governor of Minorca, on the Twenty-nine Articles Exhibited Against Him by Sir William Draper (1783)
- The trial of John Horne Tooke, on a charge of high treason (1794, 1795)
- The Trial of Thomas Hardy for High Treason: At the Sessions House in the Old Bailey, on Tuesday the Twenty-eighth, Wednesday the Twenty-ninth, Thursday the Thirtieth, Friday the Thirty-first of October, and on Saturday the First, Monday the Third, Tuesday the Fourth, and Wednesday the Fifth of November 1794 (1794 and further volumes)
- The Trial of William Stone for High Treason, at the Bar of the Court of King's Bench, on Thursday the Twenty-Eighth, and Friday the Twenty-Ninth, of January 1796 (1796). William Stone was a Unitarian radical accused of being a French agent.
- The Trial of Robert Thomas Crossfield for High Treason: At the Sessions House in the Old Bailey on Wednesday the Eleventh and Thursday the Twelfth of May 1796 (1796)
- The trial of Edward Marcus Despard, esquire: For high treason, at the Session house, Newington, Surry, on Monday the seventh of February 1803, with William Brodie Gurney.

Gurney also edited The Gospel Magazine. He had a sideline in sermons, publishing some of George Whitefield. Samuel Fisher (1742–1803) was a Baptist minister and family connection, having married Rebecca Gurney's widowed mother. Gurney published his sermons.

== Family ==
Gurney married Rebecca Brodie (1747–1818), daughter of William Brodie of Mansfield. Their two sons were Sir John Gurney, and William Brodie Gurney. Their daughter Elizabeth (1770–1840) was a close friend of Eliza Gould.

== Notes ==
Attribution

This article incorporates text from a publication now in the public domain: Stephen, Leslie; Lee, Sidney, eds. (1890). "Gurney, Thomas". Dictionary of National Biography. Vol. 23. London: Smith, Elder & Co.
