= John Angelo =

John Angelo may refer to:

- John Angelo Jackson (1921–2005), English mountaineer, educationalist, and author
- John Angelo Lester (1858–1934), American physician
- John Angelo, Canadian politician; see Athabasca (Alberta provincial electoral district) § 1921 general election

== See also ==
- John Angelos (disambiguation)
- John Angel (disambiguation)
