= John Angel =

John Angel or John Angell may refer to:

- John Angel (sculptor) (1881–1960), British-born sculptor, medallist and lecturer
- John Lawrence Angel (1915–1986), British-American biological anthropologist
- John Angel (chaplain) (fl. 1555), chaplain to Mary I of England and Philip II of Spain
- John Bartlett Angel (1913–1993), Newfoundland education and welfare activist
- John Angell (1592–1670), MP for Rye
- John Angel (preacher) (died 1655), or John Angell, English preacher
- John Angell (shorthand writer) (fl. 1758), Irish shorthand writer

== See also ==
- John Angell James (1785–1859), English Nonconformist clergyman and writer
- Johnny Angel (disambiguation)
