= Robert Bale =

Robert Bale may refer to:

- Robert Bale (chronicler) (fl. 1461), English chronicler
- Robert Bale (monk) (died 1503), English Carmelite friar and scholar
