= John Barker (minister) =

John Barker (1682–1762) was an English presbyterian minister.

== Life ==
Barker was born in 1682, but neither the locality of his birth nor the condition of his parents has been ascertained. It is probable that he was related to the Rev. Matthew Barker, who was ejected from St. Leonard's, Eastcheap, London, in 1662, and died on 25 March 1698. After school training he was educated for the presbyterian ministry by Timothy Jollie, at Attercliffe Academy, Yorkshire. Having been 'certified' by Jollie, Barker proceeded to London, and was licensed by the Presbyterians as a preacher of the gospel. In 1709 he was chosen assistant preacher to one of the foremost presbyterian congregations in London, at Crosby Square. The senior pastor was Dr. Benjamin Grosvenor, with whom Barker was on good terms.

On the death of Matthew Henry the commentator in June 1714, his congregation in Mare Street, Hackney, London, invited Barker to succeed him. There was division of opinion as to the new minister, and a secession followed, which culminated in the Gravel Pit congregation. But the majority adhered to Barker, and soon the congregation was as large as it had ever been.

Shortly after his settlement at Hackney, Barker took part in the historic controversies on the Trinity, which divided Protestant dissenters into two hostile camps, respectively known as subscribers and non-subscribers. Barker belonged to the former, and delivered a series of discourses on the supreme and absolute divinity of Jesus Christ. In 1718 he was assailed by a member of his congregation, the Rev. Martin Tomkins, on the use of doxologies in prayer and praise. Prefixed to what Tomkins called 'A Calm Inquiry whether we have any Warrant from Scripture for addressing ourselves in a Way of Prayer or Praise to the Holy Spirit,' is 'A Letter to the Rev. Mr. Barker.' Barker did not allow himself to be drawn into controversy here, but the attack led to correspondence with Dr. Isaac Watts.

In 1729 Philip Gibbs was chosen as Barker's co-pastor. He was a man of ability, but his orthodoxy was questioned: in 1737 he was forced to retire, and in 1738 the place was filled by the Rev. William Hunt. It was in the same year that Barker himself suddenly resigned.

After his resignation at Hackney, he retired to Epsom in Surrey, where he lived for about three years without any charge, but was always ready to assist his brethren. In 1741, on the death of the Rev. John Newman, he virtually became pastor of Salters' Hall congregation, although he would not take the name of their 'minister,' only that of 'morning preacher.' On the death of his colleague, the Rev. Jeremiah Tidcomb—Salters' Hall having always had two ministers—a successor was found in 1742 in the Rev. Francis Spilbury of Worcester. In 1744 Barker moved from Epsom to reside in London; but in 1745 he was resident in Walthamstow and later at Clapham.

In 1748 he was grieved by the death of his mother, and in 1751 by that of Doddridge, his frequent correspondent. In the spring of 1762 Barker, on account of old age, resigned his charge at Salters' Hall. He died on 31 May of the same year in his eightieth year.

== Works ==
A volume of Sermons were published in 1748; and he made selections for a second volume. Their publication, however, was interrupted by illness, and they did not appear till after his death (in 1763).

== Family ==
He was married twice, first to Bathsua Gledhill, daughter of Robert Gledhill, near Wakefield, Yorkshire. She died in September 1719. Secondly he married the widow of a Mr. Lamb, whose large house in Hackney (London Fields) gave name to 'Lamb's Lane.'
