= William Fox (pamphleteer) =

William Fox was a radical abolitionist pamphleteer in late 18th-century Britain. Between 1773 and 1794 he ran a bookshop at 128 Holborn Hill in London; from 1782 he was in a business arrangement with the Particular Baptist Martha Gurney, who printed and sold his and others' pamphlets.

== Publications ==
His most famous work, published in 1791, was An Address to the People of Great Britain, on the Propriety of Refraining from the Use of West India Sugar and Rum. In emotive and graphic language, it urged Britons to boycott the produce of enslaved Africans in the British West Indies, claiming:

"A family that uses only 5lb. of sugar per week, with the proportion of rum, will, by abstaining from the consumption 21 months, prevent the slavery or murder of one fellow creature; eight such families in 19 1/2 years, prevent the slavery or murder of 100, and 38,000 would totally prevent the Slave-Trade to supply our islands ... in every pound of sugar used, the produce of slaves imported from Africa, we may be considered as consuming two ounces of human flesh."

The Address became the most widely circulated 18th-century pamphlet, going through 26 editions in less than a year, with over 200,000 copies distributed in Great Britain and the United States. In his 1794 A Defence of the Decree of the National Convention of France, for Emancipating the Slaves in the West-Indies, Fox defended the decision of the National Convention of France, in the wake of the Haitian Revolution, to emancipate enslaved Africans in the Caribbean. Fox criticized members of the British Parliament for their refusal even to consider the emancipation of enslaved Africans:

"To secure, perpetuate, and extend the Slavery have been [the] sole objects [of Parliament], and the difference between the Abolitionists and their Adversaries has merely been, how these valuable ends might be well obtained ... Calumny itself cannot charge a single member of the British Legislature with being so far contaminated with French Principles, as to propose restoring the Slaves in our Islands to the benefits of civil society, and the protection of its laws."

Fox asserted that enslaved Africans should be emancipated regardless of whatever consequences might ensue:

"notwithstanding the unmeaning clamour which [Edmund] Burke has raised against abstract principles, I mean to contend, That 'No circumstances, or situation, in society, can justify the subjecting a human being, as a property, to his fellow-creature; or the continuance of such a state, where it already exists' ... Slavery is ... inimical to all government."

== Legacy ==
Fox's support for immediate revolutionary emancipation was unusual among 18th-century observers of New World slavery. Leading historian of slavery and abolition David Brion Davis, in his 1962 article "The Emergence of Immediatism in British and American Antislavery Thought," observes, "if immediatism [support for the immediate abolition of slavery] was at least latent in early antislavery thought, the dominant frame of mind of the eighteenth century was overwhelmingly disposed to gradualism. Gradualism, in the sense of a reliance on indirect and slow-working means to achieve a desired social objective, was the logical consequence of fundamental attitudes toward progress, natural law, property, and individual rights." Historian Christa Dierksheide notes that "opponents and defenders [of slavery] were not the binary opposites that historians have so long supposed ... both sides endorsed gradual improvement schemes to mitigate and reform the slave trade and slavery." Historian Padraic X. Scanlan, in his Freedom's Debtors: British Antislavery in Sierra Leone in the Age of Revolution, further notes that "by focusing on the slave trade as a target for immediate abolition, abolitionists on both sides of the Atlantic could put off the difficult question of what post-emancipation society would be like, preserve plantation economies, and coddle politically powerful planters."
