= William Addy =

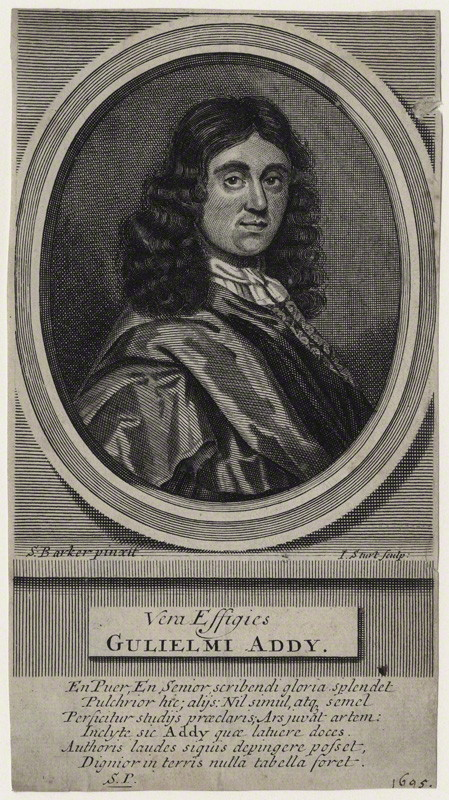
William Addy, engraving by John Sturt from a painting by Samuel Barker

William Addy (fl. 1685) was a writing-master based in London, and the author of a system of shorthand published in 1685. The method, a modification of that of Jeremiah Rich, was so much practised that the Bible, the New Testament, and the Singing Psalms were published, according to its system, two years later. The 1695 edition of his work was entitled Stenographia, or the Art of Short-Writing completed in a far more compendious methode than any yet extant. It was engraved throughout. The Bible was engraved by John Sturt. In subsequent editions of the Bible the preliminary leaves were changed, and the book dedicated to King William. All the title-pages are dated 1687.
