= Johnny Angel (disambiguation) =

Johnny Angel is a 1945 film.

Johnny Angel may also refer to:

- "Johnny Angel" (song), recorded by Shelley Fabares in 1962
- Johnny Angel (wrestler)
- Johnny Angel, former guitarist with Talas, Michael Monroe, and Arcade

== See also ==
- John Angel (disambiguation)
