= John Gurney (judge) =

British barrister and judge

Sir John Gurney KC
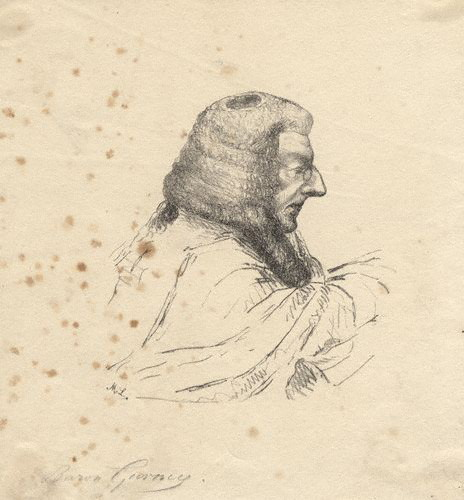

Baron of the Exchequer
- In office 13 February 1832 – January 1845
- Preceded by: Sir William Garrow

Personal details
- Born: 14 February 1768 London
- Died: 1 March 1845 (aged 77) Lincoln's Inn Fields, London
- Spouse: Maria Hawes
- Relations: Joseph Gurney (father); Thomas Gurney (grandfather); William Brodie Gurney (brother)
- Children: John Hampden Gurney; Russell Gurney
- Profession: Barrister, Judge

Sir John Gurney KC (14 February 1768 – 1 March 1845) was a British barrister and judge. Born into a family of noted stenographers, he was educated at St Paul's School and was called to the bar by the Inner Temple on 3 May 1793. After distinguishing himself in a libel trial, Gurney became junior counsel in a variety of state trials during the 1790s. After several more noted cases during the early 19th century, he was knighted and made a Baron of the Exchequer on 13 February 1832, a position he gave up in 1845 due to ill health, dying the same year.

== Early life and education ==
Gurney was born in London on 14 February 1768 into a noted family of stenographers, including Joseph Gurney (his father), William Brodie Gurney (his brother) and Thomas Gurney (his grandfather). He was educated at St Paul's School and then by Reverend Smith in Suffolk, and accompanying his father to court developed a love of the law. As a result, he was called to the bar by the Inner Temple on 3 May 1793.

== Career ==
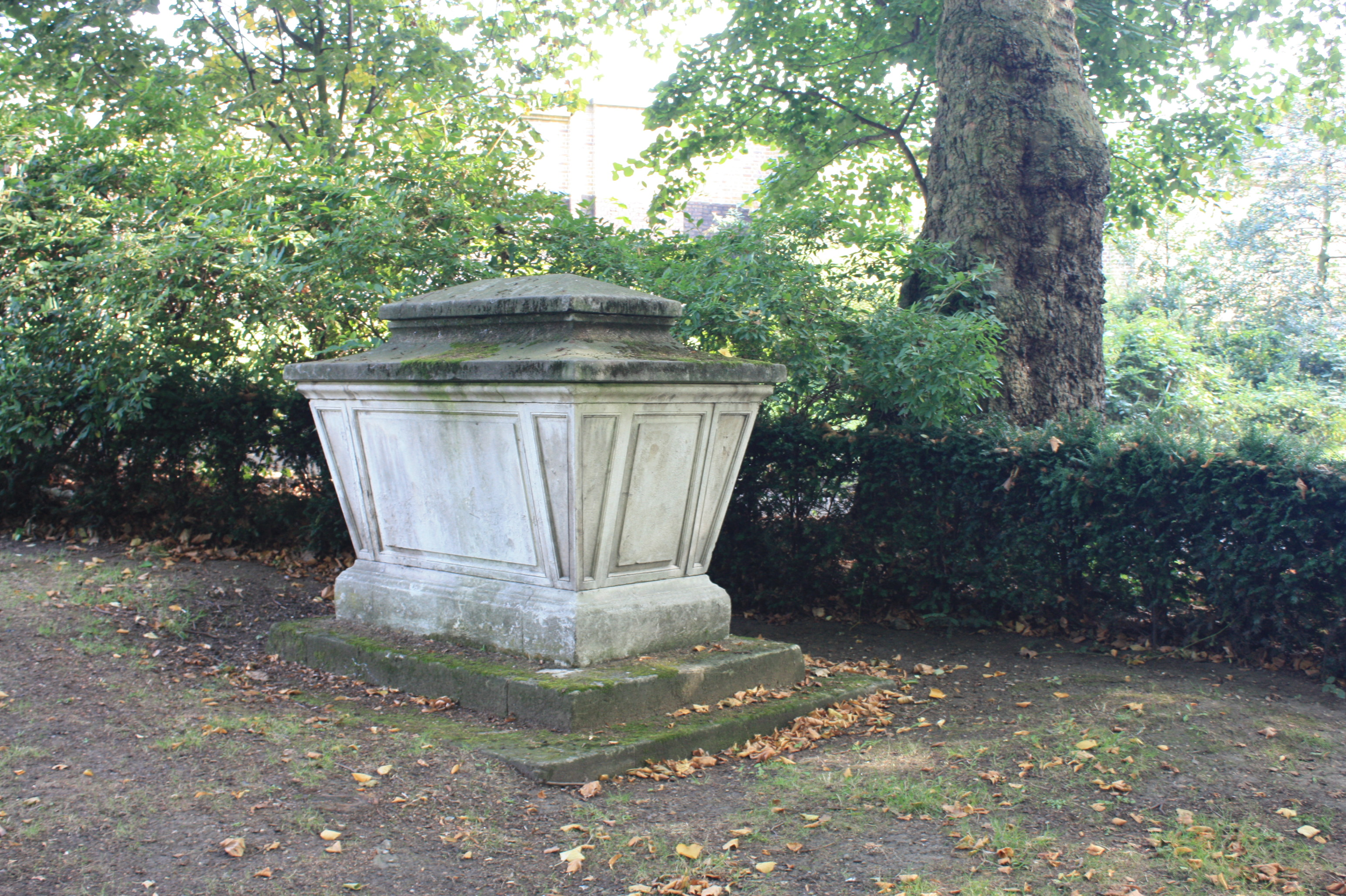
Sir John Gurney's grave, Old St Pancras Churchyard, London

Two months after qualifying as a barrister he was hired as junior counsel to defend Daniel Isaac Eaton for libel, and after his senior failed to turn up, ran the case himself. He was such a success that he was hired as junior counsel during the trials of Thomas Hardy and John Horne Tooke for treason.

Gurney later defended Robert Thomas Crossfield for complicity in the popgun plot, and then prosecuted Lord Cochrane for spreading rumours of Napoleon's death to make money on the stock exchange. As a result of this case and his prosecution of the Cato Street conspirators in 1820 he was made a King's Counsel, and on 13 February 1832 was knighted and made a Baron of the Exchequer.

In November 1835, he became the last judge in England to sentence a capital punishment for sodomy, convicting James Pratt and John Smith under section 15 of the Offences Against the Person Act 1828 (which had replaced the Buggery Act 1533). Modern interpretation has cast doubt on the facts and legality of the conviction. In January 2017, Gurney's judgment was overturned when Pratt and Smith were among those who were posthumously pardoned by the Alan Turing law that pardoned those who had been convicted of criminalised homosexuality offences which no longer exist in the UK.

In October 1843, he ignored pleas for mercy and sentenced John Hughes (Jac Tŷ Isha) to 'transportation for twenty years' for his part in the Rebecca Riots at Pontarddulais, with seven years' transportation each for David Jones and John Hugh.

== Resignation and death ==
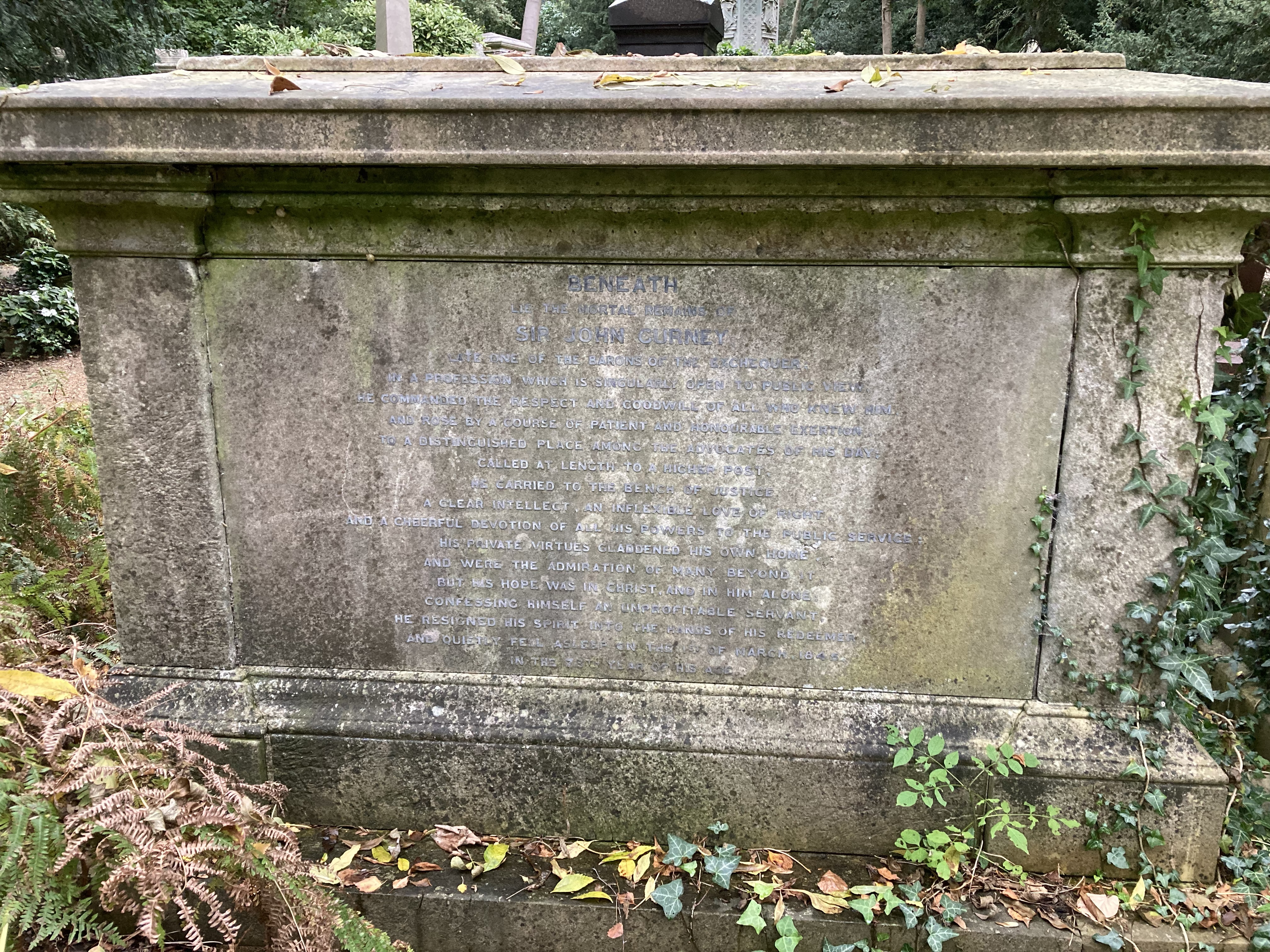
Family vault of John Gurney in Highgate Cemetery

Gurney was noted as an independent, albeit harsh judge, and held the position for over a decade until he was forced to resign in January 1845 due to ill health, dying two months later on 1 March 1845.

He was buried in a large sarcophagus-form grave in Old St Pancras Churchyard in London, to the east side of the church, south of the distinctive monument to Sir John Soane, and he is listed on the Burdett-Coutts Memorial Sundial. His remains were reinterred in the Western part of Highgate Cemetery in 1849, where his wife, Maria (1767 - 1849) (daughter of William Hawes), and other family members are also buried.

== Bibliography ==
- Foss, Edward (1870). A Biographical Dictionary of the Justices of England (1066–1870). Spottiswoode and Company. OCLC 181068114.
