= Jeremiah Rich =

English stenographer

Jeremiah Rich (died 1660?) was an English stenographer, who published a pioneering system of shorthand writing.

== Life ==
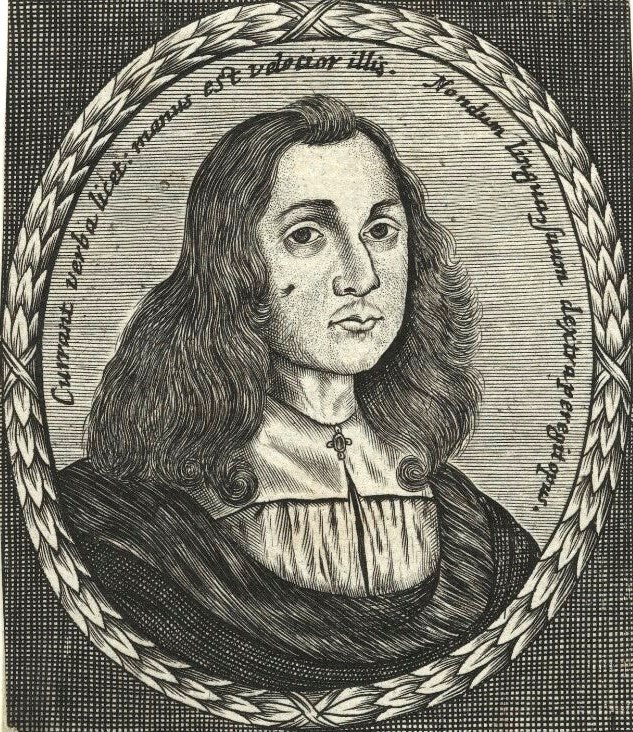
Jeremiah Rich

Rich's uncle, William Cartwright, taught him shorthand, and he became a noted practitioner of the art. He dedicated his Semigraphy to Mary Rich, Countess of Warwick, and in the preface he says: "It will be welcome, and especially to your Ladyship, because you have spent some houres in the knowledge thereof when I was in the family", probably therefore as a tutor. John Lilburne offered to give Rich a certificate, that he took down his trial at the Old Bailey with exactness. In 1646 Rich was living "in St. Olives parish in Southwark, at one Mris Williams, a midwife", and in 1659 he occupied a house called the Golden Ball in Swithin's Lane, near London Stone.

== Works ==
The first work issued by Rich was Semography, or Short and Swift Writing, being the most easiest, exactest, and speediest Method of all others that have beene yet Extant. … Invented and Composed for the Benefit of others by the Author hereof William Cartwright, and is now set forth and published by his Nephew, Ieremiah Rich, immediate next to the Author deceased, London, 1642. Rich made no claim that he was the inventor of the system. Rich, however, makes no allusion to his uncle Cartwright in the next book he published only four years later, under the title of Charactery, or a most easie and exact Method of Short and Swift Writing. … Invented and exactly composed by Jeremiah Rich, London, 1646. In other books he claimed to be the sole author and inventor of the system: in Semigraphy or Arts Rarity, London, 1654; in The Penns Dexterity, London, 1659; and in The World's Rarity, published before 1660.

That Cartwright was the original inventor of the system called after Rich's name was lost to sight. This fact was overlooked by Philip Gibbs, the earliest shorthand historian. The recognition of Cartwright's claims came after a communication made to the Athenæum in 1880 by Edward Pocknell.

The first edition of the Cartwright-Rich system, which appeared after Rich's death, bore the title: The Pens Dexterity Compleated, or Mr. Riches Short-hand now perfectly taught, which in his Lifetime was never done by anything made publique in print, because it would have hindered his Practice, London, 1669. The sixth edition of this work was published in 1713, the fifteenth in 1750, the nineteenth in 1775, and the twentieth at Leeds in 1792. Among Rich's editors or "improvers" were William Addy, Samuel Botley, Nathaniel Stringer, and Philip Doddridge, who made the study of the system obligatory in his dissenting academy at Northampton. John Locke was among the admirers of Rich's shorthand, which had a wide vogue.

Rich's tiny volume of the Psalms in metre, written in stenographic characters, was published in 1659, and the companion volume, the New Testament, appeared in the same year, with the names of many of his patrons. In October 2011, the BBC's Antiques Roadshow featured a miniature bible by Rich, valued at between £1,000 and £1,500.
