= John Angelos =

John Angelos or Angelus (Greek: Ἰωάννης Ἄγγελος) may refer to:

- John Komnenos Doukas (died 1244), ruler of Thessalonica and Thessaly, referred to as John Angelos in earlier literature
- John Angelos (protostrator) (died 1258), favourite of Theodore II Laskaris
- John Angelos of Syrmia (died 1259), son of emperor Isaac II, exiled to Hungary where he became Duke of Syrmia
- John I Angelos (died 1289), ruler of Thessaly
- John Angelos (sebastokrator) (died 1348), Byzantine general and governor of Epirus and Thessaly
- Saint John Angelus (died 1050), Venetian monk and Eastern Orthodox saint
- John P. Angelos, former executive vice president of the Baltimore Orioles
- John Angelos, protagonist of The Dark Angel (named Johannes Angelos in the original Finnish)

== See also ==
- John Angelo (disambiguation)
