= John of St Giles =

St Giles, John of (d. 1259/60), Dominican friar and physician

John of St. Giles (c. 1180 – 1259–60; fl. 1230) was an English Dominican friar and physician.

== Life ==
John was born near St. Albans, probably not later than 1180. He is said to have studied at Oxford, and afterwards, with more certainty, at Paris and Montpellier. For a short time he lectured at Montpellier on medicine. Eventually he became first physician to Philip Augustus, King of France. This appointment was no doubt made on the death of Rigord in 1209, and was probably subsequent to his residence at Montpellier. In the University of Paris John lectured on medicine and philosophy, and, after becoming a Doctor of Divinity, on theology also. He apparently acquired great wealth as a physician, and purchased the Hopital de St. Jacques at Paris, which building he presented in 1218 to the Dominicans, who from its possession were frequently known as Jacobins in France. John's sympathy with the Dominicans led him to join their order. According to the story preserved by Trivet, he was once preaching on voluntary poverty, and in order that he might enforce his words by a practical example, he descended from the pulpit, took the habit from Friar Jordan, general of the order, and then returned to complete his discourse. The date of his admission is variously given as 1222 or 1228. Trivet describes it under the earlier year, but says vaguely "circa ea tempora". Quétif and Échard inclined to the later date as more consonant with the other details of John's life.

John of St. Giles is coupled with Alexander of Hales as among the most distinguished recruits of the mendicant orders, and is stated to have been the first Englishman to join the Dominicans. According to Bale, it was his example which led Alexander to become a Franciscan. John, after becoming a friar, continued his lectures at the earnest request of his auditors, and to this is ascribed the origin at Paris of the schools of the Dominicans, who were now for the first time admitted to theological degrees in the university there.

John had for one of his pupils Roland of Cremona, whom he succeeded in 1233 as theological lecturer for the Dominicans at Toulouse. In this position he remained for two years, and distinguished himself by his powerful opposition to the Albigensian heretics. He was already known, either personally or by reputation, to Robert Grosseteste, who summoned him in 1235 to preach in "his native land". The troubles which led to the expulsion of the Dominicans from Toulouse had already commenced, and they may have induced John to accept the invitation. Grosseteste about the same time begged Alard, the English provincial of the order, to allow John of St. Giles, "who is coming to England at Michaelmas, to be with him for a year". Under the same dare (1235) Matthew Paris records that John was sent with a message from the Emperor Frederick to Henry III concerning the pregnancy of the Empress Isabella. Perhaps John had been attending the empress professionally.

On coming to England John became the head of the Dominican schools at Oxford, and held the position for many years. He formed a close friendship with Grosseteste, who in 1237 begged Friar Jordan, the general of the order, for permission to have John always with him. The Bishop conferred on John the Prebend of Leighton at Lincoln, and in 1239 made him chancellor of his diocese. John was also appointed Archdeacon of Oxford some time between 1236 and 1241. In 1239 he was made one of the royal councillors, and in 1242 he is mentioned as receiving the dying confession of the pirate, William de Marisco or Marsh. John had resigned his archdeaconry before 1244, apparently through bad health. In 1253 Grosseteste sent for John when dying, and in a remarkable conversation with him condemned the friars for their lack of zeal in condoning the faults of the great, and especially in not opposing the improper preferments conferred by the Pope. John attended Richard de Clare, Earl of Gloucester, when ill from poison in 1258: he had once saved Grosseteste's life on a like occasion. This is the last notice we have of John, who must have been of a great age, and probably died not long afterwards.

== Legacy ==
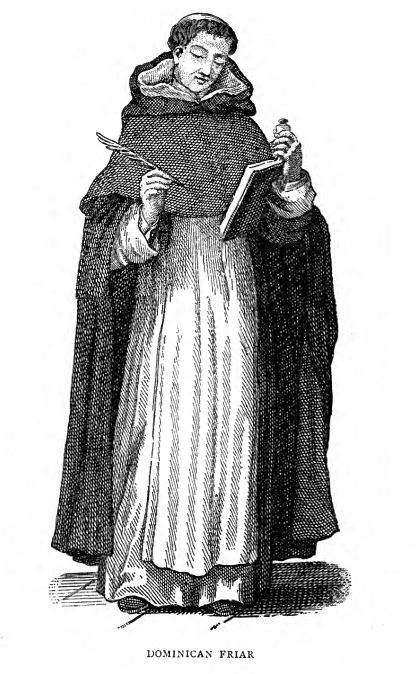
A Dominican friar

Matthew Paris says John was an "elegant scholar and teacher, skilled in medicine and theology". Elsewhere he is described as "vir bonus et sanctus, cujus facies et vita erat gratiosa". Trivet calls him "suavissimus moralizator", and says his capacity in this respect was clear to any one who had inspected his books "manu propria emendatos". The same writer adds that he was a very skilful physician, and that many wonderful stories were told of his prognostications and cures. The names of a number of treatises ascribed to John have been preserved, but the only one extant is a collection of medical prescriptions styled Experimenta Joannis de S. Ægidio. He is said to have also written De Formatione Corporis, and some other medical works. He must be distinguished from Ægidius Corbeiensis (Gilles de Corbeil), whose Versus de Urinis have been sometimes wrongly assigned to him. Nor is John likely to be the author of the Versus de Lethargia, de Tremore, et de Gutta Oculi, which in one manuscript of the Versus de Urinis are spoken of as "liber de Sancto Ægidio". John is stated to have written commentaries on the sentences of Peter Lombard and on some works of Aristotle, and also homilies and a variety of theological treatises: De Laude Sapientiæ Divinæ, De Mensura Angelorum, De Esse et Essentia, and others. Leland says that he had seen at Oxford theological treatises by one Ægidius which showed much learning, but whether they were by our author he could not say. Probably there has been some confusion with his namesake, Guido de Colonna or Ægidius Romanus, whose treatise on original sin has been sometimes ascribed to John.

== Titles ==
John is variously referred to as Jonnnes Anglicus, Joannes Ægidius de Sancto Albano, or Joannes de Sancto Ægidio. The last is apparently the more correct. In English he is spoken of as John of St. Giles, John Giles, or John of St. Albans. He has also been called Joannes de St. Quintino; but this and the statement that he was dean of St. Quintin appear to be due to a confusion with Jean de Barastre.

== Sources ==
- M. Paris, Rolls Ser.;
- Grosseteste, Epistolæ, Rolls Ser.;
- Monumenta Franciscana, Rolls Ser.;
- Bale, iii. 84;
- Tanner's Bibl. Brit-Hib. p. 10. "Ægidius";
- Fuller's Worthies. ii. 24;
- Astruc's Hist. de la Faculté de Médecine de Montpellier, pp. 147–150, Paris, 1767;
- Quétif and Echard's Scriptt. Ord, Præd. i. 100–1;
- Hist. Litt. de la France, xviii. 444–7;
- Bibl. Dict. S.D.U.K. B.v. "Albans";
- Revue de Toulouse. October 1866, xxiv. 233–6, 242–4, art. by M. Gatien-Arnault.

== Bibliography ==
- Kingsford, Charles Lethbridge (1892). "John of St. Giles" . In Lee, Sidney (ed.). Dictionary of National Biography. Vol. 29. London: Smith, Elder & Co. pp. 446–448.
