= John Angel (preacher) =

English preacher

John Angel or Angell (died 1655), was an English preacher.

== Biography ==
Angel was from Gloucestershire, born towards the end of the sixteenth century. He was admitted of Magdalen Hall, Oxford, in 1610. He proceeded to his degrees of B.A. and M.A. He was then ordained in holy orders. He became a frequent and popular preacher, and many puns were made on his name. He does not appear to have been presented to any living but to have gone about as an evangelist. In 1629, or earlier, Francis Higginson declined an appointment as town preacher at Leicester because of his growing nonconformity. Angel, who then conformed to the establishment, was put in his stead by ‘the mayor of Alderney,’ and he is found in 1630 as a lecturer.

In 1634, he was suspended by the dean of Arches for preaching without licence; an ordinary minister was not allowed to preach without a licence issued by the bishop of the diocese. With relation to Angel's suspension William Laud wrote in his Diary: "In Leicester the dean of the Arches suspended one Mr. Angell, who had continued a lecturer in that great town for these divers years without any licence at all to preach, yet took liberty enough. I doubt his violence hath cracked his brain, and do therefore use him more tenderly, because I see the hand of God hath overtaken him." The biographer Samuel Clarke wrote that Angel was subject to great spiritual darkness, but Richard Vines relieved and comforted him.

In 1650, at Leicester, Angel differed with the Puritan Independents and refused to sign the engagement to the Commonwealth regime. The Mercers' Company of London stepped in to relieve him. They appointed him as lecturer at Grantham, Lincolnshire, and he remained there until his death in 1655. Anthony à Wood quotes the tributes that contemporaries paid him.

== Family ==
Angel was a relative of Dr John Angell (d. 1665), a physician and clergyman in Leicestershire.

== Works ==
Published works:

- "Right Government of the Thoughts, or a Discourse of all Vain, Unprofitable, Idle, and Wicked Thoughts" (1659)
- "Right Ordering of the Conversation" (1659)
- "Preparation for the Communion" (1659)
- "Funeral Sermon for John, Lord Darcey" (1659)
