= Aadan-Gurey Maxamed Cabdille =

- ادم غرئ محمد عبدلي
- Born: 1840; Dhusa Mareb, Somalia
- Died: 5 November 1920 (aged 80); Dhusa Mareb, Galgadud, Somalia
- Education: Somali National University
- Occupations: Poet, warrior
- Spouse: Salaado Sade
- Children: Maxamed Aadan
- Writing career
- Pen name: Aaadan Gureey
- Subjects: Old age, love, faith, mortality
- Notable works: Todobaatan iyo Tobani About old age,(famous, often quoted poem); Ab Hareeri; AadanGureey iyo Faarax Afcad; Angarafareey

Aadan-Gurey Mohamed Abdille (1840–1920), (other spellings Aaden-Gurey Maxamed Cabdille for English printed works, and for Af-Soomaali: Aadan-Gureey Maxamed Cabdille and Arabic: ادم غرئ محمد عبدلي), was a Somali poet. Aadan-Gurey was a poet who at times led armies to fight feuding tribes. Tribes often invaded each other's grazing or settlement areas between Nugal Valley, Mudug and Galgadud regions, areas south-central Hibin and Heb region on the Somali coast of Indian Ocean.

== Early life ==
Aadan-Gurey was born in the central Somali region of Galgadud and spent much of his years in the Ximan area of Galgadud between Galkaio and Abudwak. He first composed poems in his 20s and 30s. Aadan Gureey's most famous poem "Seventy and Ten" was printed on the first book, containing collections of the earliest poems in the Somali literature collections.

The poet died the same year as Mohammed Abdullah Hassan died, in 1920. The two poets didn't know about each other, but they both composed volumes of poems of classic Somali language. printed poetry, and widely available literature. In Af-Soomaali several are included in high school textbooks and the second poem is in the second year secondary class levels.

Aadan Gureey was an established poet by 1870s while at the prime age of 30. A decade before the Europeans interrupted the African way of life, Adan-Gurey Maxamed Cabdille and other poets, including contemporaries such as Sayid Mohammed Abdullah Hassan, used poetry to illustrate what was happening in the world around them.

== Works ==
At the time there was no official Somali orthography. As a result, most prized poems were not recorded and only a handful of lines remain of the period's Somali literary collection.

Only 5-6 of Aadan-Gurey's poems survive:

- Todobaatan iyo Toban (famous, often quoted poem)
- Ab Hareeri
- Aadan Gureey iyo Faarax Afcad
- Angarafareey
