= Philip Gibbs (minister) =

Philip Gibbs (1695–1752) was an English nonconformist minister and stenographer, known now as the first historian of shorthand writing.

== Life ==
He was appointed in 1715 the assistant to the Rev. Robert Bragge, at the independent chapel in Paved Alley, Lime Street, London. He was chosen one of the first of William Coward's Friday evening lecturers at the meeting-house in Little St. Helen's, Bishopsgate. In 1729 he moved from Lime Street to Hackney, where he was joint pastor with John Barker. He had avowed himself a Calvinist, but he eventually adopted Unitarian opinions, and was in consequence dismissed from his ministry in 1737.

== Works ==
His works are:

- Christ the Christian's Propitiation and Advocate. In Twelve Sermons preach'd at Mr. Coward's Lecture, London, 1729, p. 438.
- An Historical Account of Compendious and Swift Writing, London, 1736; dedicated to John Jacob. This is the earliest history of shorthand. It gives an account of all the English systems from Timothy Bright to James Weston.
- An Essay towards a farther Improvement of Short-Hand, London, 1736, pp. 56, engraved throughout. Gibbs's own system of stenography, in the opinion of Thompson Cooper writing in the Dictionary of National Biography, is clumsy and complicated, and inferior to that of William Mason, published in 1707.
- A Letter to the Congregation of Protestant Dissenters at Hackney, amongst whom the Author now statedly ministers. With a postscript to all others to whom he has formerly preach'd, London, 1737,(three editions).
- Explications and Defences of P. Gibbs's Letter to the Congregation of Protestant Dissenters meeting in Mare Street, Hackney, London, 1740. This and the preceding work relate to the author's conversion to Unitarianism.
- A pamphlet on the controversy between the rival shorthand inventors John Byrom, James Weston, and Macaulay. About 1740.
