= Edmund Gurney (divine) =

English clergyman and anti-Catholic writer

Edmund Gurney or Gurnay (died 1648) was an English clergyman and anti-Catholic writer.

== Life ==
Gurney was son of Henry Gurney of West Barsham and Ellingham, Norfolk, by his wife Ellen, daughter of John Blennerhasset of Barsham, Suffolk. He matriculated at Queens' College, Cambridge, on 30 October 1594, and graduated B.A. in 1600. He was elected Norfolk fellow of Corpus Christi College in 1601, proceeded M.A. in 1602, and B.D. in 1609. In 1607 he was suspended from his fellowship for not being in orders, but was reinstated by the vice-chancellor.

In 1614 he left Cambridge, on being presented to the rectory of Edgefield, Norfolk, which he held till 1620, when he received that of Harpley, Norfolk. Gurney was inclined to puritanism, as appears from his writings. On one occasion he was cited to appear before the bishop for not using a surplice, and on being told he was expected to always wear it, 'came home, and rode a journey with it on.' He further made his citation the occasion for publishing his tract vindicating the Second Commandment. Thomas Fuller, who was personally acquainted with him, says: 'He was an excellent scholar, could be humorous, and would be serious as he was himself disposed. His humours were never prophane towards God or injurious towards his neighbours.' Gurney died in 1648, and was buried at St. Peter's Mancroft, Norwich, on 14 May in that year. His successor at Harpley was instituted on the following day. It is therefore plain that Gurney conformed to the covenant, and that the Dr. Gurney whom Walker mentions as a sequestered clergyman living in 1650 was another person. Gurney was married, and apparently had a son called Protestant (d. 1624—monument at Harpley). His wife's name was Ellen.

== Works ==
- Corpus Christi, Cambridge, 1619, 12mo. This is a treatise against Transubstantiation, in the form of a homily on Matt. xxvi. 26.
- The Romish Chain, London, 1624.
- The Demonstration of Antichrist, London, 1631, 18mo.
- Toward the Vindication of Second Commandment, Cambridge, 1639, 24mo, a homily on Exod. xxxiv. 14, answering eight arguments commonly alleged in favour of image worship. A continuation of the preceding appeared in 1641, and was republished in 1661 as Gurnay Redivivus, or an Appendix unto the Homily against Images in Churches, London, 24mo.
