= Matthew Barker =

Matthew Barker (1619 – 25 March 1698) was an English Independent minister and parliamentarian, known for his work on natural theology and for his participation in English 17th-century politics.

== Life ==
Matthew Barker was born in Great Cransley, Northamptonshire, to parents unknown. He worked as a schoolmaster in Banbury, Oxfordshire, until the outbreak of the English Civil War, at which point he became preacher to a London parish. Barker was an avid parliamentarian and was invited to preach a sermon before the House of Commons on 25 October 1648. The new republic welcomed him, and his moderation earned him the favour of the Cromwell regime, which made him an assistant to the London commission.

After the Restoration of the English monarchy, Barker became a nonconformist, forming his own London congregation. Following the Glorious Revolution, Barker worked to promote unity among Dissenters. To this end he published a collection of advice for scholars entering the ministry, entitled Flores intellectuales.

Barker's major published work was Natural Theology (1694) in which Barker sought to demonstrate the existence of God from the properties of nature.

He died in London.
