= William Mason (stenographer) =

English writing-master and stenographer (fl. 1672–1709)

William Mason (fl. 1672–1709) was an English writing-master and stenographer.

== Life ==
Working in London, Mason first tried shorthand in 1659. He started with the system then generally attributed to Jeremiah Rich, though by William Cartwright. After a few years Mason looked for a system of his own.

In 1682 Mason was established as a teacher of writing and shorthand in Prince's Court, Lothbury, near the Royal Exchange, and celebrated for his skill in extremely minute handwriting. In 1687 he had moved his academy to the Hand and Pen in Gracechurch Street, and in 1699 he was settled at the Hand and Pen in Scalding Alley, taking pupils there and at home.

== Works ==
Mason published shorthand systems:

- A Pen pluck'd from an Eagles Wing. Or the most swift, compendious, and speedy method of Short-Writing, London, 1672.
- Arts Advancement, or the most exact, lineal, swift, short, and easy method of Short-hand-Writing hitherto extent, is now (after a view of all others and above twenty years' practice) built on a new foundation, and raised to a higher degree of perfection than was ever before attained to by any, London, 1682. His new method, with the author's portrait engraved by Benjamin Rhodes, and a dedication to Alderman Sir Robert Clayton. This work was reprinted in 1687 and 1699.
- La Plume Volante, or the Art of Short-Hand improv'd. Being the most swift, regular, and easy method of Short-Hand-Writing yet extant. Compos'd after forty years practice and improvement of the said art by the observation of other methods, and the intent study of it, London, 1707. A third system, already taught it in manuscript for 15 years. Dedication to the Right Hon. Robert Harley, secretary of state; reprinted in 1719; 5th edit. about 1720. This system of 1707 was slightly altered and published as Brachygraphy by Thomas Gurney in 1750. In its modified form it was used by official shorthand writers in Parliament, over a long period.

Mason's other works were:

- A regular and easie Table of Natural Contractions, by the persons, moods, and tenses, London [1672?].
- Aurea Clavis, or a Golden Key to the Cabinet of Contractions, London, 1695 and 1719.
- An ample Vocabulary of Practical Examples to the whole Art of Short-writing: containing significant characters to several thousands of words, clauses, and sentences, in alphabetical order, manuscript that went to the Harvard College Library.

== Notes ==
Attribution

This article incorporates text from a publication now in the public domain: Lee, Sidney, ed. (1893). "Mason, William (fl.1672-1709)". Dictionary of National Biography. Vol. 36. London: Smith, Elder & Co.
