= Robert Edward Gurney =

British writer (born 1939)

Robert Edward Gurney, Luton, England, 1939, is a British writer. He lives in St Albans, England.

== Biography ==
He studied Modern Languages at St Andrews University in Scotland. He has travelled widely in Europe, Africa and Latin America. Between 1964 and 1967 he studied and worked in Uganda. In 1972 he conducted interviews with the Spanish poet Juan Larrea in Córdoba, Argentina. He obtained a doctorate in Spanish from the University of London in 1975, thesis title:The Poetry of Juan Larrea. He lectured on Modern French Poetry, The Generation of '27 and Modern Latin American Poetry at Middlesex University.

Much of Gurney's work is in the British Library and the National Library of Wales. He writes in English and Spanish.

== Works ==
=== Poetry ===
- Poemas a la Patagonia, St Albans, 2004.
- Luton Poems, St Albans, 2005.
- El cuarto oscuro y otros poemas, Madrid, 2008.
- Poemas a la Patagonia, edición aumentada, Madrid, 2009.
- La libélula y otros poemas / The Dragonfly and Other Poems, Madrid, 2013.
- La casa de empeño y otros poemas / The Pawn Shop and Other Poems, Madrid, 2014.
- To Dylan, Llandeilo, 2014.
- Dylan's Gower, Llandeilo, 2014.
- El acantilado y otros poemas, Llandeilo, 2017.
- Antología poética, Madrid, 2018
- Two Days in Ireland, 2018.
- Gower Poems, St Albans, 2024.

=== Short stories ===
- A Night in Buganda, Tales from Post-Colonial Africa, St Albans, 2014
- Absurd Tales from Africa, Llandeilo, 2017
- Bat Valley and Other Strange African Animal Stories, Llandeilo, 2017

=== Translation ===
- The River and Other Poems, translation of Andrés Bohoslavsky's El río y otros poemas, St Albans, 2004

=== Anthologies ===
- Nueve monedas para el barquero, St Albans, 2005
- Los poetas de la senda, antología de la poesía mundial, Madrid, 2014
- Stories in Antología de cuento breve, serial pecados, México, 2012 – 2015: "The Greedy Academic", Gula; "The Last King of Rwanda's Jaguar", Envidia; "90 Harley Street", Soberbia; "Greed in Buganda", Avaricia; "El afroamericano enojado" ("The Angry African American"), Ira; "Una noche en Buganda", Lujuria; "El perezoso" ("The Lazy Man"), Pereza

=== Academic ===
- La poesia de Juan Larrea, Bilbao, 1985
- A Companion to Spanish Surrealism: Juan Larrea and the Film Buñuel Did Not Make, Woodbridge, 2004
- Articles and chapters in books on the Hispanic avant-garde - Larrea, Huidobro, Vallejo, Diego, Picasso, Buñuel, 1976-2004

== Media ==
In 2014 he was filmed for the series on contemporary poets (Spain).

== Awards ==
- In 2007 Gurney won a prize for poems on the theme "Rimbaud" in the Concurso de Poesía Libre de Artesanías Literarias, Israel.
- In 2010 he won a Juan Laurentino Ortiz prize, Paraná, Argentina.
