= Robert Bale (chronicler) =

English chronicler

Robert Bale (fl. 1461), was a medieval English chronicler.

Bale, known as Robert Bale the Elder, is said to have been born in London. He practised as a lawyer, and was elected notary of the city of London, and subsequently a judge in the civil courts. He wrote a chronicle of the city of London, and collected the stray records of its usages, liberties, &c. The following is a list of his writings according to John Bale

1. Londinensis Urbis Chronicon
2. Instrumenta Libertatum Londini
3. Gesta Regis Edwardi Tertii
4. Alphabetum Sanctorum Angliæ
5. De Præfectis et Consulibus Londini
