= William Brodie Gurney =

English shorthand writer and philanthropist (1777-1855)

William Brodie Gurney (1777–1855) was an English shorthand writer and philanthropist of the 19th century.

== Biography ==
Gurney was the younger son of Joseph Gurney, a shorthand writer, who died at Walworth, Surrey, in 1815, by a daughter of William Brodie of Mansfield. He was the grandson of Thomas Gurney (1705–1770), the shorthand writer, and brother of Sir John Gurney (1768–1845),

Born at Stamford Hill, London, on 24 December 1777, he was taught by Mr. Burnside at Walworth in 1787, and afterwards by Mr. Freeman. He received adult baptism at Maze Pond Chapel, Southwark, on 1 August 1796. Adopting the profession of his father and his grandfather, he commenced practice as a shorthand writer in 1803, and between that date and 1844, he took down in shorthand many of the most important appeals, trials, courts-martial, addresses, speeches, and libel cases, a number of which were printed as volumes from his notes. In pursuit of his calling, he frequently visited Ireland, Scotland and many parts of England. He reported the impeachment of Lord Melville in 1806, the proceedings against the Duke of York in 1809, the trials of Lord Cochrane in 1814 and of Arthur Thistlewood in 1820, and the proceedings against Queen Caroline. In 1802, in conjunction with his father, he was appointed to take notes of evidence before the committees of the Houses of Lords and Commons, and in May 1813, he was formally appointed shorthand writer to the houses of parliament, his emolument being two guineas a day for attendance, and one shilling a folio for the transcript of his notes. He is mentioned as a famous shorthand writer in Byron's Don Juan, canto i. st. clxxxix.

=== Religious and philanthropic interests ===
Gurney joined with his friend, Joseph Fox, in 1795 and opened a Sunday school at Walworth, of which he in the following year became the secretary. In 1801, he commenced the Maze Pond Sunday school, an establishment almost akin to a ragged school, and here he introduced the Scottish method of catechising in the scriptures. On 13 July 1803, he was present at a public meeting in Surrey Chapel schoolroom, when the "Sunday School Union" was established. Of this society, he became successively secretary, treasurer, and president, and at the jubilee meeting in 1853, he was one of the three surviving original subscribers. In 1805, with other persons, he commenced The Youth's Magazine, a cheap popular periodical, devoted to religious subjects. It was the earliest publication of the kind and one of the most successful. For ten years Gurney was a joint editor of this work, for thirty years its treasurer, and until his death an occasional contributor exercising some general supervision. A large profit made on it was devoted to educational and missionary institutions. He was a member of the first committee of the London Female Penitentiary, formed in 1807, and was one of the lay preachers who for many years took the Sunday services in that institution.

In 1812, on the establishment of the Westminster auxiliary of the British and Foreign Bible Society, he was elected a member of the first committee, and soon after became secretary. In connection with the Baptist denomination, he was treasurer of Stepney College from 1828 and of their foreign missions from 1835. Like his father, he was warmly interested in the anti-slavery movement. Towards rebuilding chapels in Jamaica and sending additional ministers there, he was a liberal contributor, besides frequently receiving Baptist missionaries in his own house. He purchased a residence at Muswell Hill, Middlesex, in 1826, when the Rev. Eustace Carey, who had recently returned from India, came to reside with him. The house was then licensed as a place of worship, and during four years Carey and other ministers held Sunday evening services in the drawing-room. In March 1803, he married Miss Benham, who died at Muswell Hill in 1830.

Gurney died at Denmark Hill on 25 March 1855 and was buried in the family vault at West Norwood Cemetery.

=== Works ===
Gurney was the author of A Lecture to Children and Youth on the History and Characters of Heathen Idolatry. With some references to the effects of Christian Missions, 1848. He edited the fifteenth and sixteenth editions of his grandfather's Brachygraphy, 1824 and 1835. His son Joseph Gurney followed in his father's steps as a shorthand writer and biblical scholar.
