= Thomas Gurney (shorthand writer) =

English shorthand-writer (1705–1770)

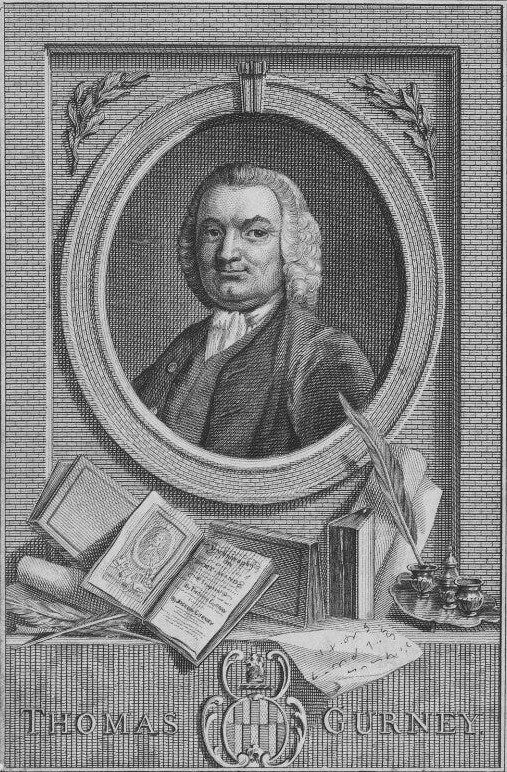
Thomas Gurney

Thomas Gurney (1705–1770) was an early English shorthand-writer and developer of shorthand style used by Charles Dickens.

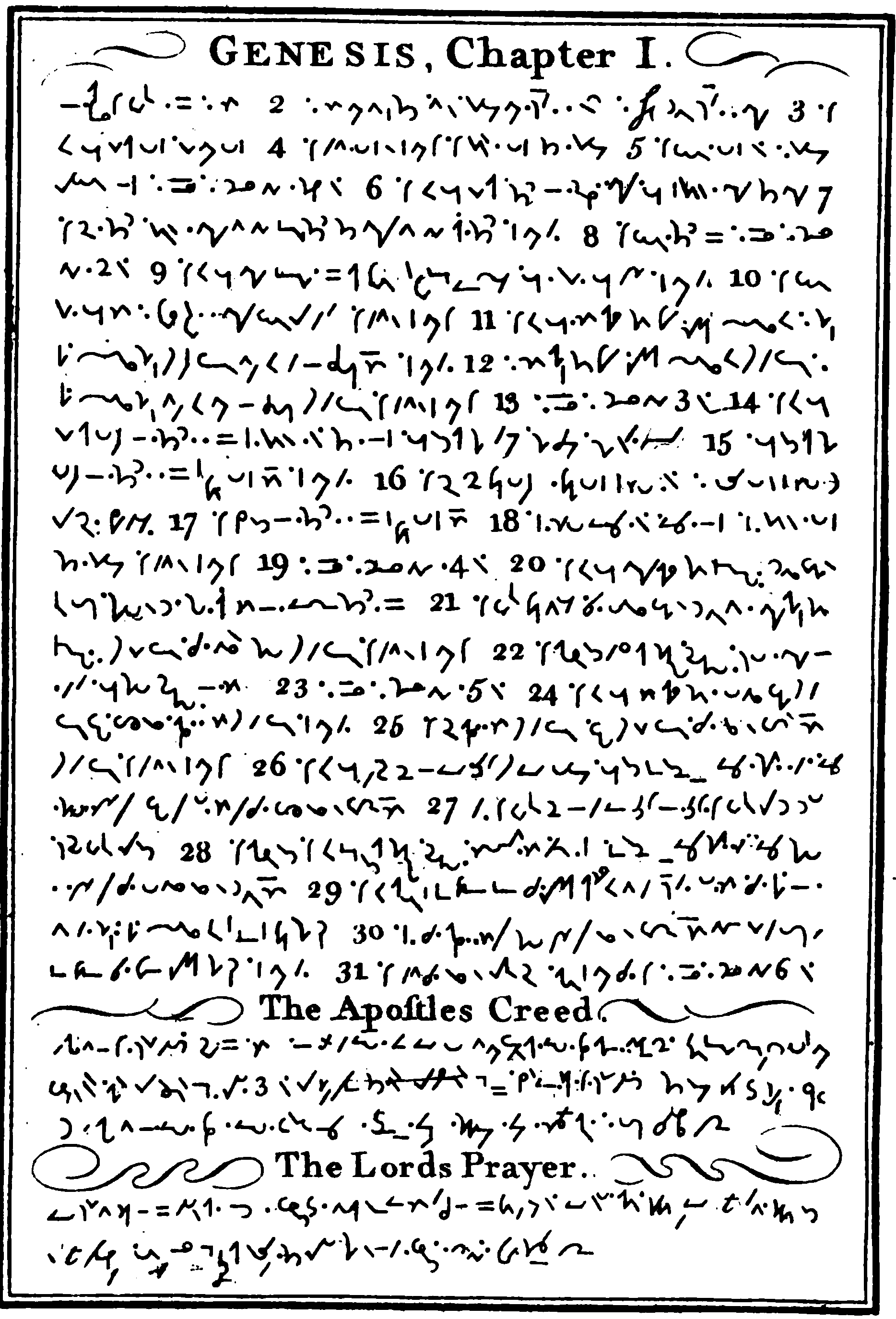
Example of Gurney shorthand

== Early life ==
Gurney was born at Woburn, Bedfordshire, on 7 March 1705. His father, John, though of an ancient family (his descent is traced in the "Record of the House of Gournay"), belonged to the yeoman class, and was a substantial miller with a large family. Thomas was intended for a farmer, but his inclination for books and mechanics was so decided, that when put to farming he ran away twice.

He then learned clockmaking, and soon afterwards became a schoolmaster at Newport Pagnell and Luton.

His connection with shorthand was brought about accidentally. In order to obtain a work on astrology, about which he had a boyish curiosity, he purchased at a sale a lot containing an edition of William Mason's "Shorthand," which he studied to such purpose that at the age of 16 he began to take down sermons. His notebook of 1722–3 is still preserved, and shows that at that time he used Mason's system with very little alteration.

== Career ==
In 1737 Gurney came to London, and was soon afterwards appointed shorthand-writer at the Old Bailey. The date of the appointment, according to his grandson William Brodie Gurney, and most shorthand historians, was 1737, and this date corresponds with the length of time during which he is said to have practised at the Old Bailey. Gurney himself, however, in the postscript to the fourth edition of Brachygraphy, gives the date 1748. He may have originally practised without an appointment, or may have held a subordinate post for the first ten years. In any case it was the first official appointment of a shorthand-writer, anywhere, although there had been instances of the use of shorthand for official purposes. Gurney also practised in "all the Courts of Justice in the Cities of London and Westminster, Admiralty Courts, Courts-Martial, and trials in divers parts of the Kingdom" and "in the Honorable House of Commons" (postscript to 4th edition of Brachygraphy).

== Return to clockmaking ==
In 1749 Gurney was carrying on business as a clockmaker in Bennett Street, near Christ Church, Blackfriars Road, London, at the same time as he was teaching shorthand at the Last and Sugar-loaf, Water Lane, Blackfriars. On 16 October 1750 he published his system under the title of Brachygraphy, or Swift Writing made Easy to the Meanest Capacity. The whole is founded on so just a plan, that it is wrote with greater expedition than any yet invented, and likewise may be read with the greatest ease. Improv'd after upwards of thirty years' practice and experience, London, 34 engraved pages. The price of subscription was 2s. 6d. on application, and 5s. on delivery. One of the early learners of the system was Erasmus Darwin, who contributed some commendatory verses to the second edition, published in 1752.

== Later life and death ==
The profession of shorthand-writer or teacher yielded at that time a slender income, and Gurney was glad to continue his business as a clockmaker, and to supplement his income by designing patterns for calico-printing for one of his friends who was a manufacturer. He held his appointment at the Old Bailey till his death on 22 June 1770.

== Personal life ==
He married in 1730 Martha, daughter of Thomas Marsom, an ironmonger in Luton, Bedfordshire, son of the reverend Thomas Marsom of Luton who was once imprisoned with John Bunyan for attending "unlawful assemblies or conventicles". Following the death of his first wife on 29 May 1756 he married Rebeccah Wicks on 7 October 1756 and they had one child, Rebecca.
