= Cranbury Park =

Country house and estate in Hampshire, England

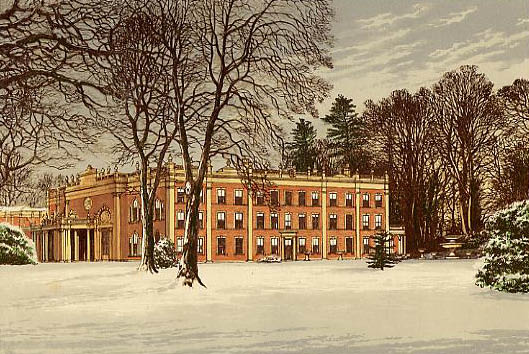
Cranbury Park in Hampshire, England: coloured woodcut from Morris's Country Seats (1880)

Cranbury Park is a stately home and country estate situated in the parish of Hursley, Winchester, England. It was formerly the home to Sir Isaac Newton and later to the Chamberlayne family, whose descendants continue to own and occupy the house and surrounding park and farmland in the 21st century. The house and park are not generally open to the public, although open days are occasionally held.

== History ==
=== Early years ===
Cranbury was originally an important hamlet of Hursley, with many distinct farms and cottages, but now the name belongs only to Cranbury House and Park. The first recorded tenant of Cranbury is a Mr. Shoveller, who surrendered it to Roger Coram before 1580. Coram rented Cranbury at £17 2s per annum from the Lord of the Manor of Merdon, Sir Thomas Clarke.

An incident is recorded of a dispute between Coram and Clarke regarding the rights of the tenants and the Lord of the Manor:

It seems that when the tenants were called on to perform work in hedging, reaping, or hay-making, upon the lands of the lord of the manor, in lieu of money rent he was bound to feed them through the day, and generally to conclude with a merry-making. So, no doubt, it had been in the good old days of the bishops and the much loved and lamented John Bowland; but harder times had come with Sir Thomas Clarke, when it required the interference of Mr. Coram of Cranbury to secure them even an eatable meal. No doubt such stout English resistance saved the days of compulsory labour from becoming a burden intolerable as in France.

...upon a haydobyn-day (320 or 340 reapers) the cart brought a-field for them a hogs-head of porridge, which stunk and had worms swimming in it. The reapers refused to work without better provisions. Mr. Coram of Cranbury would not suffer them to work. Mr. Pye, Sir Thomas Clarke's steward, and Coram drew their daggers, and rode at each other through the wheat. At last Lady Clarke promised to dress for them two or three hogs of bacon.

Following the death of Coram, Sir Edward Richards held the property until the 1640s, when he let it to Dr John Young, dean of Winchester. During the Commonwealth era, when Young was expelled from the deanery, he lived in quiet retirement at Cranbury. His widow occupied the estate in 1650, and later transferred the house to Sir Charles Wyndham, who married her daughter in 1665. Sir Charles, who (like Coram before him) was noted as "a zealous assertor of the tenants' rights", was Member of Parliament for Southampton from 1679 to 1698 and for St Ives in Cornwall from 1698 to 1701. He died in 1706, although his wife survived him until 1720. A small monument was raised for them in Hursley Church.

=== John Conduitt and Sir Isaac Newton ===
On the death of Lady Wyndham, the house and estate were sold to John Conduitt. In May 1721, Conduitt married Catherine Barton, half-niece and adopted daughter of Sir Isaac Newton. Shortly after his marriage, Conduitt became MP for Whitchurch, Hampshire. Towards the end of his life, Newton became resident at Cranbury Park, remaining there until his death in 1727. On Newton's death, Conduitt succeeded him as Master of the Mint. In 1734, although Conduitt was re-elected to his seat at Whitchurch he chose to represent Southampton instead.

Conduitt had a sundial installed in the gardens at Cranbury Park, which was calculated by Sir Isaac Newton. The sundial has been described thus:

The gnomon is pierced with the letters I.C., and the arms of Mr. Conduitt, the owner, as granted to him in 1717, are engraved on the plate with his motto: "Cada uno es hijo de sus obras." ("Each one is the son of his deeds." - a quotation from "Don Quixote") The maker's name, John Rowley, is below.

The dial is divided into nine circles, the outermost divided into minutes, next the hours, then a circle marked "Watch slow, Watch fast", another with the names of places shown when the hour coincides with our noonday, such as Samarcand and Aleppo, etc., all round the world. Nearer the centre are degrees, then the months divided into days. There is a circle marked with the points and divisions of the compass, and within, a diagram of the compass, the points alternately plain and embossed.

=== The Dummer family and Lady Dance-Holland ===
Conduitt died in 1737, leaving a daughter, Catherine, whose guardians sold Cranbury Park to Thomas Lee Dummer, who succeeded him as MP for Southampton, retaining that position for four years. In 1747, he was elected as MP for Newport on the Isle of Wight and continued to represent that town until his death in 1765. On his death, the estate was left to his son, Thomas, who also succeeded him as MP for Newport. Thomas was subsequently to become MP for Yarmouth (1769–1774), Wendover in Buckinghamshire (1775–1780) and Lymington (1780–1781). He was also elected to represent Downton in Wiltshire in 1774, but his election was declared invalid.

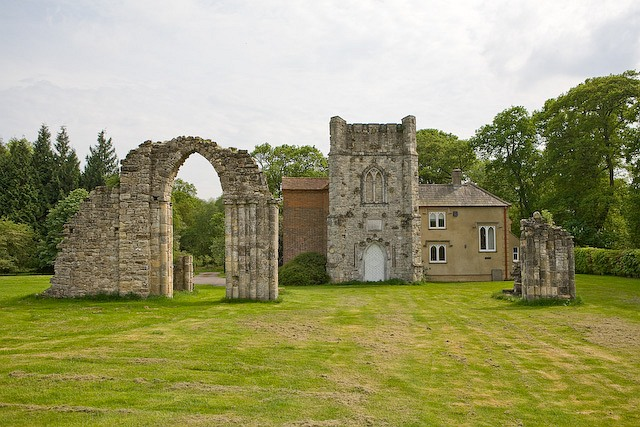
The Castle, Cranbury Park. Built from fragments of the north transept of Netley Abbey moved to Cranbury Park in the 1760s.

In 1770, Thomas purchased the City Cross (also known as the Buttercross) from the Corporation of Winchester, intending to have it re-erected at Cranbury. When his workmen arrived to dismantle the cross, they were prevented from doing so by the people of the city, who "organised a small riot", and they were forced to abandon their task. The agreement with the city was cancelled and Dummer erected a lath and plaster facsimile, which stood in the park for about sixty years before it was destroyed by the weather.

Undaunted by his failure to acquire the City Cross to grace the estate, Dummer turned his attention to the ruins of Netley Abbey, which he also owned, and moved the north transept of the abbey to Cranbury Park, where it can be still be seen as a folly in the park, at 51°00′08″N 01°21′49″W. The ruins comprise an arch, the base of a pillar, and a scaled-down gateway tower. The rear of the gateway has been made into a keeper's cottage and is known to the village of Otterbourne as "the Castle" and is marked as such on the Ordnance Survey map.

Thomas Dummer died without heirs in 1781, leaving his property at Cranbury and Netley and also at Horninghold in Leicestershire first to his widow, Harriet, with reversion to Thomas Chamberlayne, a member of a family with which the Dummers had been previously connected. Harriet Dummer (the daughter of Sir Cecil Bishopp, 6th Baronet) then married the artist Nathaniel Dance (later Sir Nathaniel Dance-Holland, Bt), whose brother George Dance had designed the present-day house, built in 1780. Like many of his predecessors and successors, Dance-Holland was an MP serving East Grinstead in East Sussex from 1790 to 1802 and again from 1807 to his death in 1811, and Great Bedwyn from 1802 to 1806.

=== The Chamberlayne family ===
Dance-Holland died in 1811, but his wife survived him until 1825; on her death, William Chamberlayne, MP for Southampton, came into the property under the terms of the will of Thomas Dummer. William Chamberlayne (1760–1829) was MP for Southampton from 1818 until his death. Whilst serving the town, William Chamberlayne was also chairman of the company supplying gas lighting to the town of Southampton and donated the iron columns for the new gas street-lights, also the public baths at Northam. In 1822, the townspeople erected a memorial to William Chamberlayne in gratitude, consisting of an iron Doric column; in 2000, the column was moved to its current location in Houndwell Park.

On the death of William Chamberlayne in 1829, the estate passed to his cousin Thomas Chamberlayne. Thomas (1805–1876) was a keen yachtsman who sailed his yacht Arrow in the inaugural America's Cup race in 1851. This race was won by America. In 1852, however, Arrow beat the famous America in the race at Ryde for the Queen's Cup. Thomas also played cricket for Hampshire and was a great hunting and coursing enthusiast, who built both new stables and a cricket pitch at Cranbury Park.

On Thomas's death in 1876, the estate passed to his son, Tankerville Chamberlayne. Tankerville Chamberlayne was also MP for Southampton from 1892 until 1896, when he was disqualified for electoral fraud in the 1895 General Election; despite this he was returned to office in 1900 until he lost his seat in 1906. It was only after his retirement from politics that Tankerville Chamberlayne took up permanent residence at Cranbury, having previously resided at his Weston Grove estate in Southampton.

Tankerville died in 1924 and was succeeded by his son, also called Tankerville, who had married Magaret Frances Bertram in 1922. He in turn was succeeded by his only daughter Penelope Mary Alexandra Chamberlayne in 1943. She married Major Nigel Donald Peter Macdonald (son of Sir Godfrey Middleton Bosville Macdonald of the Isles (15th Baronet)), changing their surname to "Chamberlayne-Macdonald".

Major Chamberlayne-Macdonald died on 15 August 2013. The family are still resident at Cranbury Park. During the Second World War, the house was briefly the base for Canadian troops prior to their embarkation for the Normandy landings.

== House ==
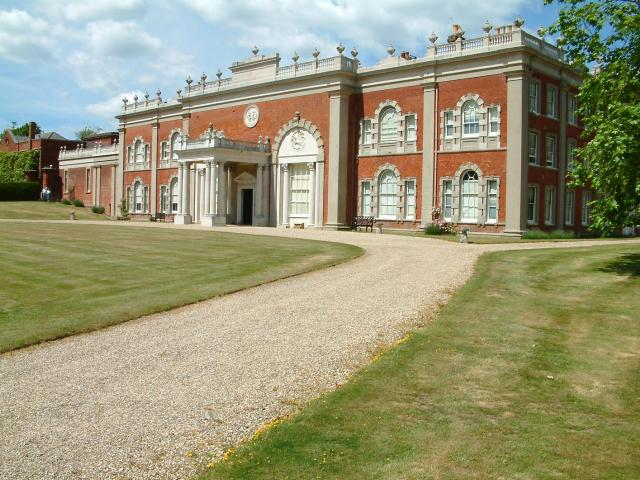
Cranbury House

The present-day house was built in 1780 for Thomas Dummer and his wife, to the designs of George Dance the Younger. The house is built in red brick with stone dressings. The entrance is through a porte-cochère either side of which are large columned windows flanked by columns, set in arch-headed reserves, with roundels in relief in each tympanum and above the porch. All the other windows of both floors repeat the Venetian window motif which was added along with balustrade by Thomas Chamberlayne in the 1830s. Balustrades surmounted by urns run around the parapet, framing the whole house to give a very pleasing prospect within the landscape.

Of the interior, Nikolaus Pevsner wrote that it was an "unforgettable experience" to behold the hall with its coffered tunnel-vaults to the full height of the house and the beautiful ballroom. There is a starfish vault derived from the tombs of the ancients. The main rooms are arranged around a central hall and staircase, and there is a good deal of fine plaster decoration in the William Kent style, especially in the drawing room on the south front. The ballroom designed by George Dance the younger has a circular domed ceiling. The library was designed by John Buonarotti Papworth for Thomas Chamberlayne in about 1830.

Writing in 1898, John Keble described the house thus:

"Cranbury Park is on a hill, intersected by various springs, and where the peaty ground soon gives way to gravel. The house, a large red brick one, built round a court, so that it looks low in proportion to its width, is on the level ground at the top, flat as it fronts to the south, but in the rear descending rapidly. In fact, on that side the grounds have the air of cresting the hill, and there is a group of exceedingly tall pine-trees which are a land-mark of the country on all sides, though the tallest of them was blown down a few years ago. Near them is one of the old-fashioned orangeries, with a great deal of wall and very little glass, and near it stands the sundial of Newtonian fame."

The house was listed in 1984, and is Grade I.

== Estate ==
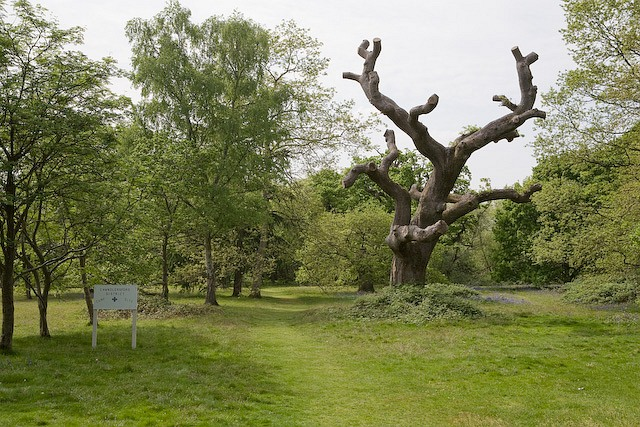
Scout Camp site in Cranbury Park

The house stands on a hill at 85 metres above sea level and from the extensive grounds beautiful views are obtained of Southampton Water and the Isle of Wight to the south.

The extensive pleasure grounds were laid out in the late 18th and early 19th centuries by John Papworth, and include fountains, a rose garden, specimen trees and pinetum, the lakeside walk and the fern walk. The folly known as "The Castle", built from material plundered from Netley Abbey, is situated in the southern corner of the park.

A stream rises in the park passing through the Upper and Lower Ponds, close to The Castle. From here it passes through Hiltingbury Lake, then under Merdon Avenue in Chandler's Ford, before joining Monks Brook. Between the Upper Pond and The Castle is the campsite of the Eastleigh and Chandlers Ford Scout District.

The park is included on the Register of Historic Parks and Gardens of Special Historic Interest in England and is Grade II* listed.
