= Steam yacht =

Type of watercraft

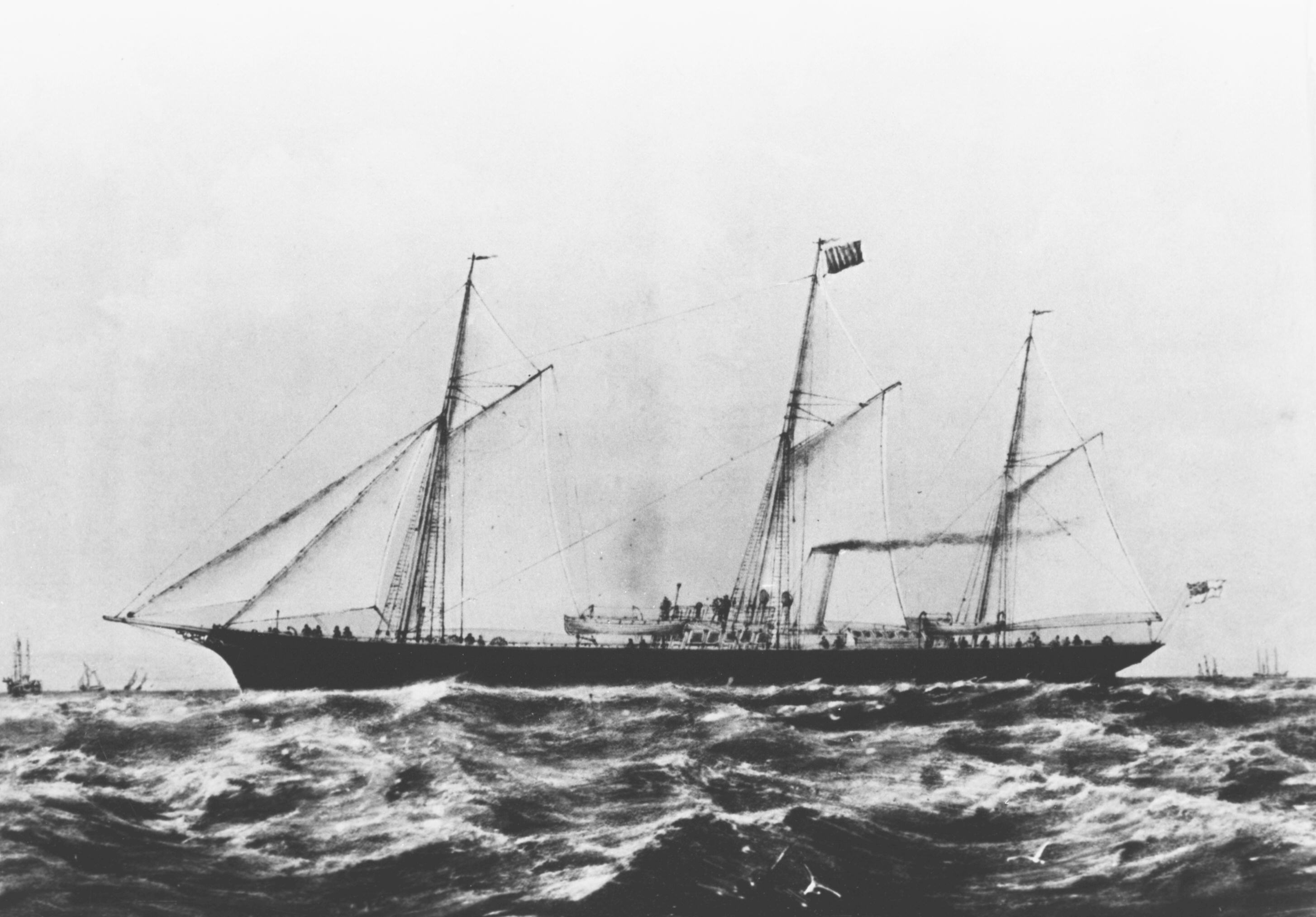
British yacht Xantha (built 1867) in about 1890

A steam yacht is a class of luxury or commercial yacht with primary or secondary steam propulsion in addition to the sails usually carried by yachts.

== Origin of the name ==
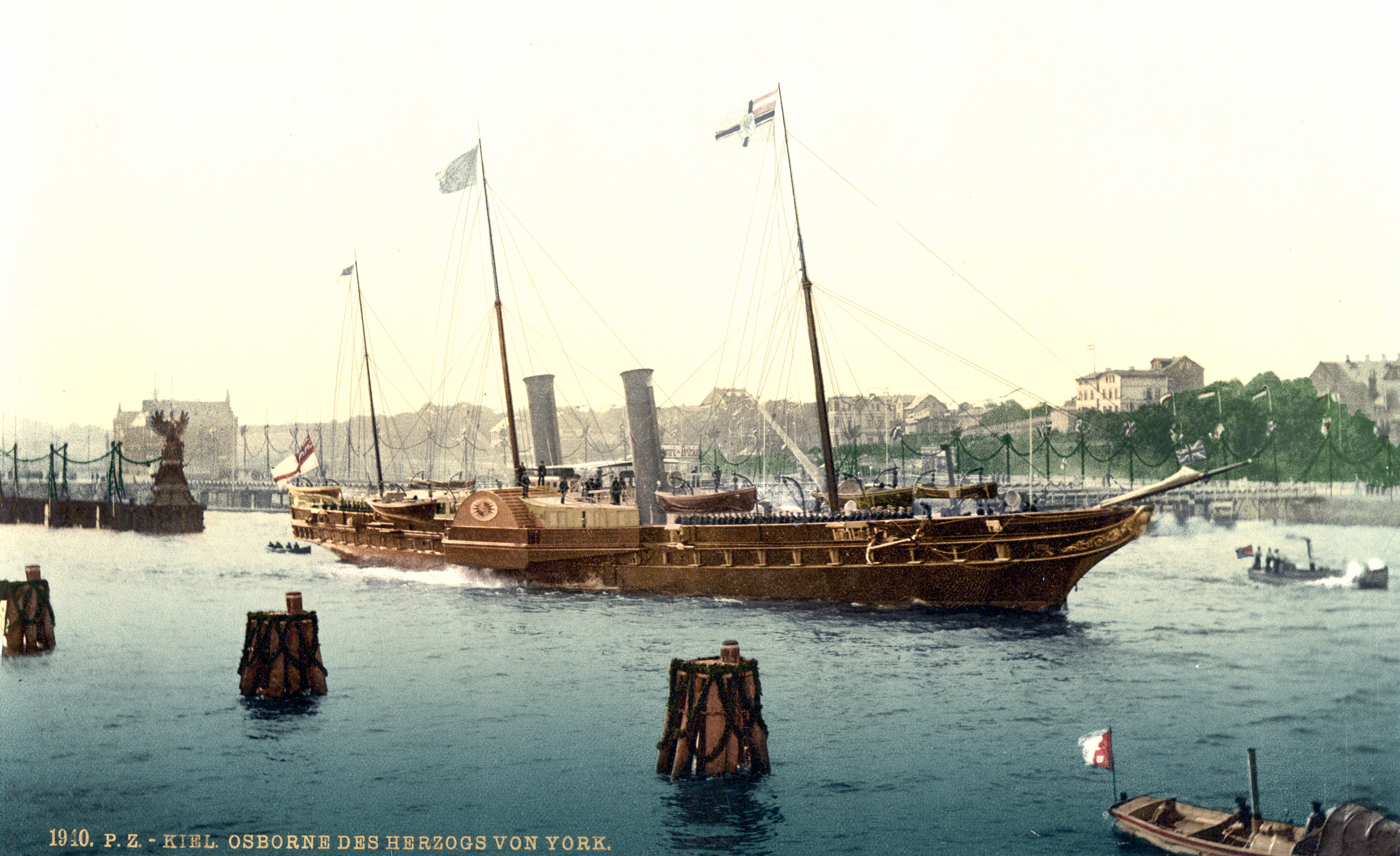
HMY Osborne (built 1870) in about 1895

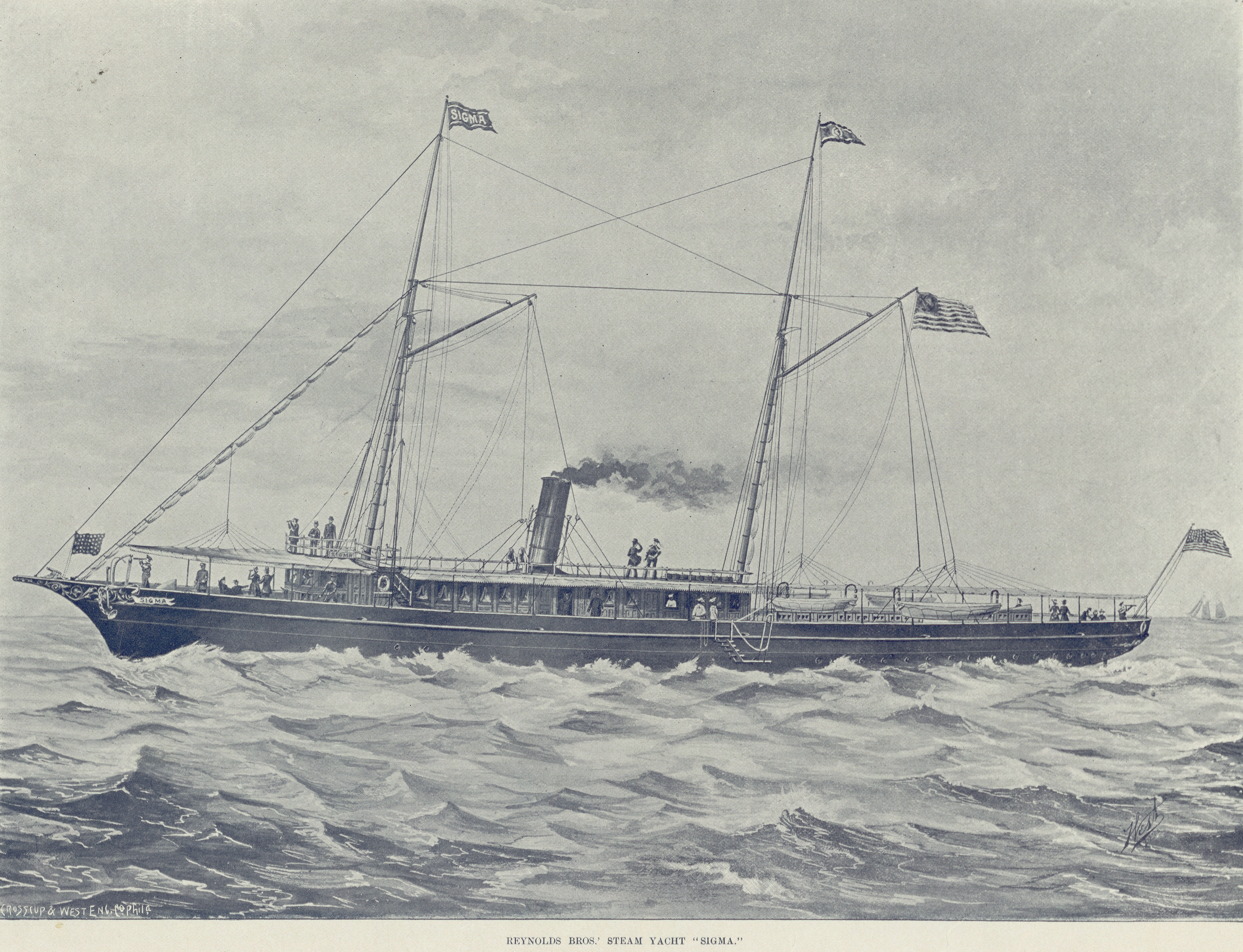
The Reynolds Brothers Steam Yacht "Sigma" 1895

The English steamboat entrepreneur George Dodd (1783–1827) used the term "steam yacht" to describe the steamer Thames, ex Duke of Argyle. Her service on the river had first been advertised on 22 June 1815 as "Thames Steam Yacht", intended to emphasise how luxurious these vessels were.

== Earliest steam yachts ==
The first two private steam yachts known were:

- Endeavour, a wooden paddle steamer registered 28 January 1828 by builders Rawlinson and Lyon, Lambeth, 75’6” x 12’ x 7’2”, 25 tons with a 20 HP Maudslay patent oscillating engine with two cylinders 20in. dia. X 2 ft. stroke, and registered to the eminent English engineer Henry Maudslay, London on 21 February 1828, who used her as his private steam yacht. The eminent Scottish engineer James Nasmyth mentions a trip aboard her to Richmond.
- Swift, a wooden sailing smack built in 1803 at Bridport by Booles & Good, not registered. Unknown owners at Leith in 1804; documents missing. Converted to a paddle steamer, described as a steam yacht, and registered by T. West, H. Bellingham, E. H. Creasey and others of Brighton on 21 August 1822 at Shoreham-by-Sea, 106’5” x 23’1” x 10’8”, 143 tons. They ran her as a ferry between Brighton and Dieppe. She was sold to G. Crichton, R. Ogilvie & others in Leith in February 1824. Crichton & Ogilvie were well-known managers. She was sold to H. Templer in London in September 1827 and finally to Turkey in October 1828 when she became the Sultan's steam yacht Surat, later taken into the Ottoman Navy as its first steam vessel.

Thomas Assheton Smith II was excluded from the Royal Yacht Club for his advocacy of the steam yacht, eight of which he commissioned between 1830 and 1851, beginning with the Menai. In cooperation with the Scottish engineer Robert Napier, whose Govan, Glasgow yard built a number of them, Smith did much to improve the hull design of steam yachts. After 1856, when the Royal Yacht Squadron (the Club became Squadron in 1833) removed their edict, steam yacht building began to multiply.

In England around 1901, some steam-powered fairground swings attempted to recreate the steam yacht experience; one example was built by the fairground equipment engineer Frederick Savage.

== Types ==
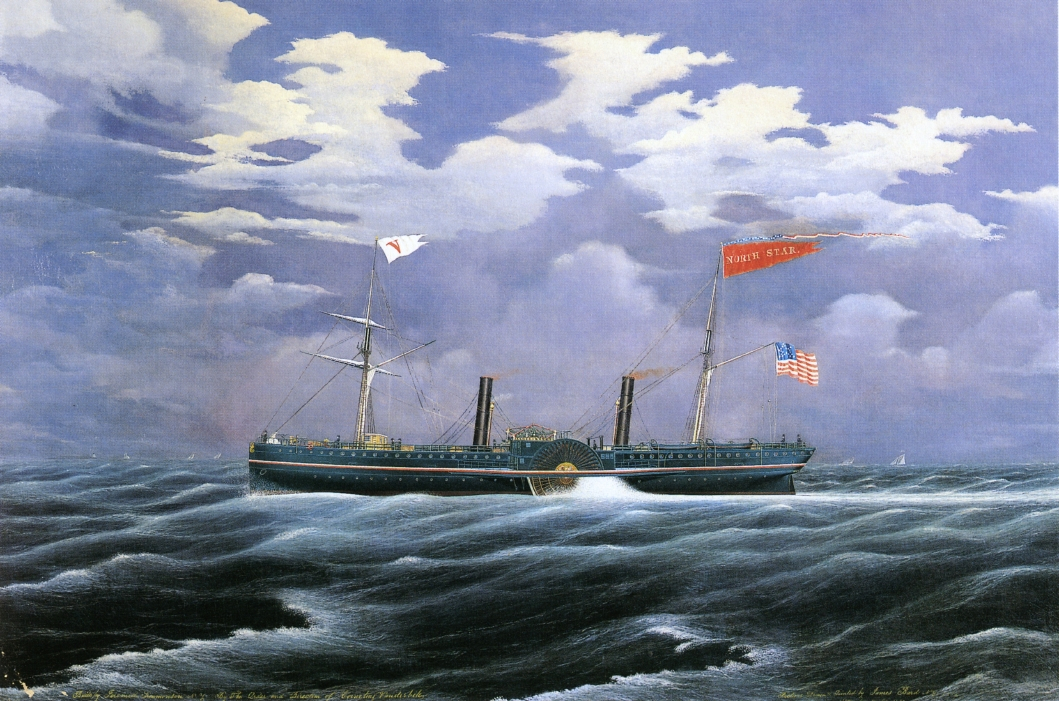
Cornelius Vanderbilt's North Star

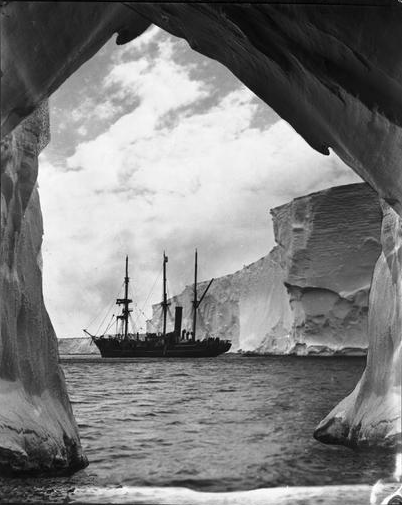
Aurora (built 1876) at anchor in Antarctica in 1913

The term "steam yacht" encompasses vessels of several distinct uses, but of similar design.

=== Luxury yachts ===
A luxury yacht in the modern sense is a vessel owned privately and used for pleasure or non-commercial purposes. Steam yachts of this type came to prominence from the 1840s to the early-20th century in Europe. The first British royal yacht was Victoria & Albert of 1843. Nominally the first steam yacht in the United States was Cornelius Vanderbilt's North Star, launched in 1854; however, this was actually a full-size steamship fitted out for the personal use of Vanderbilt and his family, and left no legacy on steam yacht design. The first true steam yachts known to have been built in the United States, Leonard Jerome's Clara Clarita and R. F. Loper's Wave, were completed in 1864.

Steam yachts were commissioned by wealthy individuals and often heads of state as extravagant symbols of wealth and/or power. They were usually built with similar hull-lines to clipper ships, with an ornate bow structure and a low, smooth freeboard. Main propulsion usually came from one or two steam engines, later of compound type, or in even later, very large yachts, triple expansion or turbines. Steam yachts usually carried rigging for sails, originally as an auxiliary propulsion system, but later more for show and naval tradition. Private steam yachts were capable of long seagoing voyages, but their owners' needs and habits saw most stay near to the coast. Inland seas such as the Baltic and the Mediterranean were popular areas for using steam yachts.

Statistics show that Clydeside was the premier building area for steam yachts in the United Kingdom: 43 shipbuilding yards there built 190 steam yachts between 1830 and 1935. Scotts Shipbuilding & Engineering Co Ltd of Greenock, Scotland, built 23 steam yachts between 1876 and 1904.

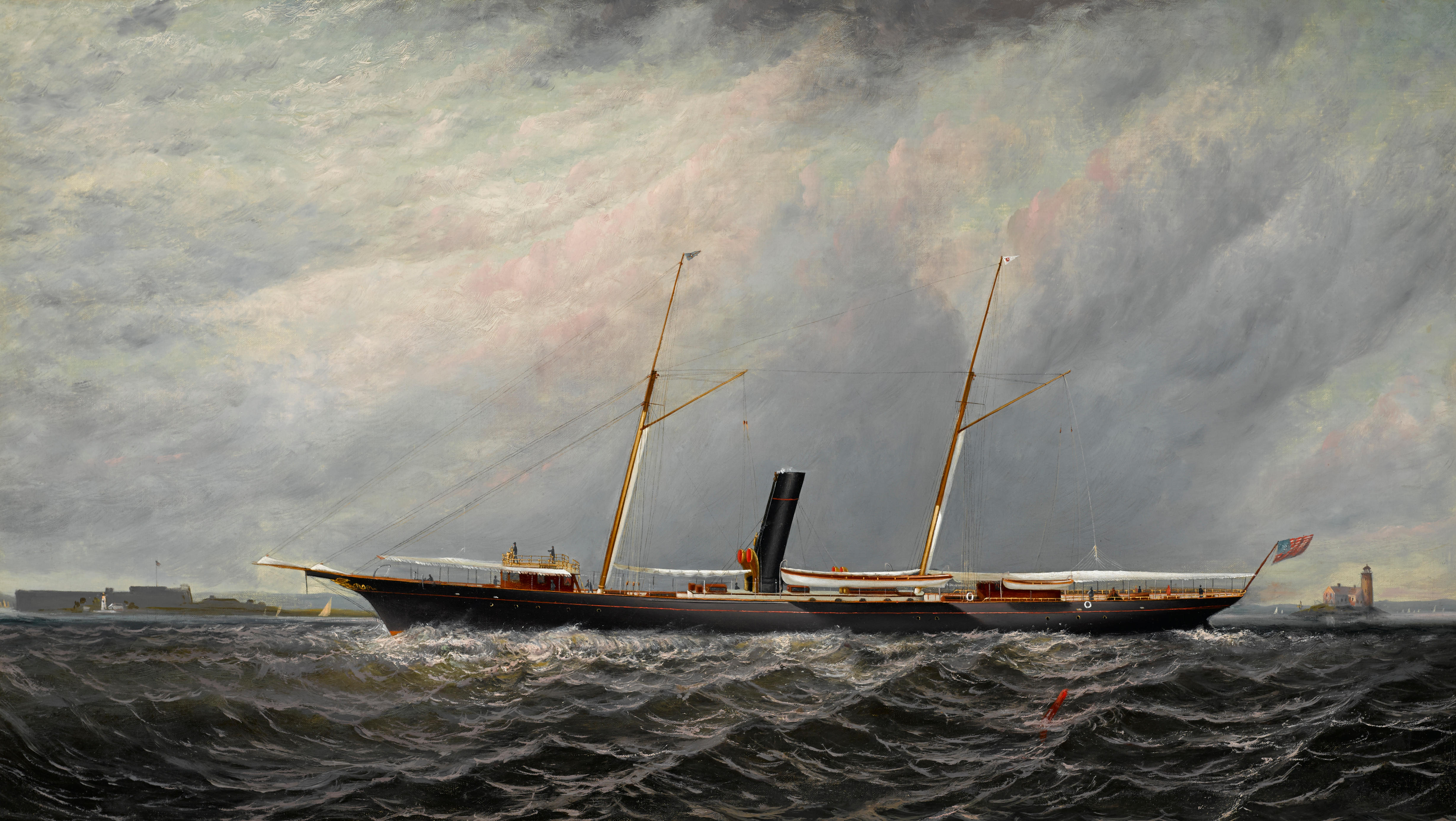
Painting of the steam yacht Stranger of the New York Yacht Club off Execution Lighthouse, 1880 by Elisha Taylor Baker

The auxiliary steam yacht is a class of steam yacht in the luxury category. In 1876–77, British politician Thomas Brassey took his wife and children on a world cruise in their newly built yacht, the 532 ton Sunbeam. Brassey preferred sail as the primary source of motive power, but knew from years of experience the advantages of steam power, when wind and tide made progress difficult. Sunbeam was, therefore, designed as a "steam auxiliary", capable of covering long distances between coaling stations under her fully rigged sail area of 9200 square yards, but with enough fuel to steam for up to 20 days if necessary (she could carry 80 tons of coal). Their trip was made famous by a book written and published by his wife Annie Brassey – A Voyage in the Sunbeam, our Home on the Ocean for Eleven Months. Within a few years other yachts were built for owners with a similar sense of adventure, famously Lancashire Witch for Sir Thomas George Fermor-Hesketh, 7th Baronet and Wanderer for Charles Joseph Lambert. These sailing yachts, with steam auxiliary power, were more expensive to build and run, but gave the owners the freedom to roam the world without necessarily planning their routes via the network of coaling stations in existence at this time. In addition the yacht masters were not totally reliant on the quality of the steaming coal available to them, that could at times be questionable. When not in steam, the funnel on the auxiliary yacht would be lowered and the propeller feathered to reduce drag.

=== Commercial yachts ===
Those of the second class of steam yacht were built for commercial use, but gained the 'yacht' title due to their size and design similarity with the private vessels and because they were not constructed to be mainly cargo- or passenger-carrying vessels, but as versatile, low-draft ships capable of working local coastal routes. This is closer to the original meaning of the word "yacht", coming from the Dutch term Jacht, describing a small, fast commercial vessel. The distinction between a commercial steam yacht and a coastal trading vessel is not a clear one, but the latter term usually implies a mainly cargo-carrying ship. Steam yachts were often run by packet companies operating regular, timetabled services between islands or coastal towns. Steam yachts were widely used in the whaling trade.

The light, fast design of a steam yacht was ideal for chasing whales, and the lack of a large amount of cargo space did not matter as whaling produced few bulky products. Commercial steam yachts were rarely as ornate or luxurious as their private counterparts, with simpler, more rugged lines and usually a more practical sailing rig. Steam yachts used in the whaling trade often had reinforced hulls to allow them to operate amongst the ice of frozen waters.

This meant that several whaling-yachts crossed the definition from commercial to private yacht in later life when they were bought for polar exploration work. Since these expeditions were, by and large, privately funded the ships used became, by definition, private steam yachts and many were registered with the 'SY' prefix used for such craft. The Aurora, Morning, Nimrod, Terra Nova and the Quest are all examples of commercial vessels that went on to become steam yachts used during the Heroic Age of Antarctic Exploration. It was common for expedition leaders to be members of a yacht club, so many of these ships were registered to a civilian club and flew a club burgee (and a Blue Ensign in the case of British steam yachts). Ernest Shackleton's ship Endurance and Roald Amundsen's Fram are unusual cases of vessels being purpose-built as icebreaking private steam yachts. Endurance was originally built for conducting tourist cruises of the Arctic, bringing her close to the definition of a yacht in the modern sense.

=== Naval yachts ===
Amazon (built 1885) pictured in 1889

The Royal Navy used small numbers of steam yacht-type vessels from the Victorian era onwards to transport men and equipment in harbour, act as coastal escorts for larger ships and for training and exercises. A good example of this was the iron p.s. Fire Queen built for the entrepreneur Thomas Assheton Smith (II) (1776–1858), (his first of three Fire Queens) by Robert Napier, Govan, Glasgow and launched on 27 July 1844, Napier Yard No 5, engine No 88. She was bought by the British Admiralty in July 1847 for £5,000 for use as a tender; there is an illustration (incorrectly captioned) of her in that role. She was sold on 4 August 1883 for £1,100 by the Admiralty to Castle the shipbreakers. Fire Queen was replaced by the Admiralty by the former Steam yacht Candace, launched on 23 September 1881 by Ramage & Ferguson, Leith, bought by the Admiralty in 1882 and then duly renamed Fire Queen.

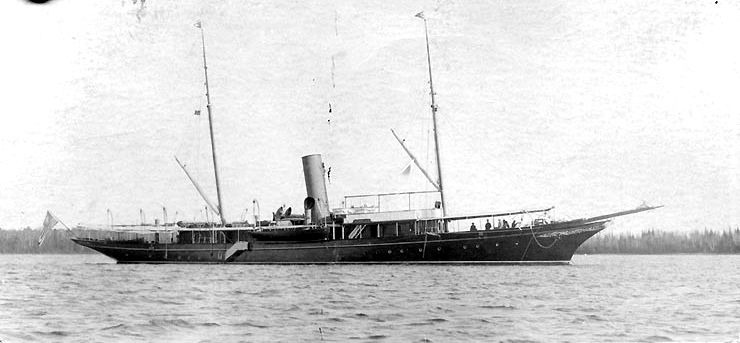
US steam yacht Rambler (built 1900) pictured before the First World War

In the First World War, vessels such as these and several requisitioned private yachts were used on anti-U-boat patrols and for minesweeping. It became clear that the naval trawler was more suited to these kinds of tasks.

Steam yachts often used the ship prefix SY, but some were alternatively described as screw schooner, if they carried schooner rig. An example of the screw schooner is the 125-year-old British Amazon, built at Southampton in 1885 from designs by Dixon Kemp and still in use in the USA after crossing the Atlantic in 2009, although diesel-propelled since 1937. She was photographed on Columbus Day 2009 on a mooring near the Herreshoff Marine Museum in Bristol, Rhode Island.

== Examples ==
Aurora built by Alexander Stephen & Sons Ltd, Glasgow in 1876 (a former whaling-yacht turned Antarctic exploration vessel) is a notable example of the class, as are the Victorian era yachts used by European monarchs, such as the HMY Victoria and Albert III and the SMY Hohenzollern. One of the oldest steam yachts, and one of the few still surviving today, is the Kheideval Yacht, Mahroussa, which was built in 1865 and was maintained in seaworthy condition by the Egyptian government.

The Hildegarde and Hiawatha were steam yachts chartered by the British Ministry of Agriculture, Fisheries and Food between 1912 and 1914 to carry out fishery investigations. Before the First World War, the SY Hildegarde was renamed as the Managem. On 15 January 1917 she was requisitioned by the Admiralty and armed with a 12-pounder naval gun. Notably she was stationed off Atlit, Israel, and used to relay espionage messages from operatives onshore (and briefly used by the Jewish "Nili" espionage group).

== See also ==
- Steamboat
