= Tankerville Chamberlayne =

British politician and cricketer

Tankerville Chamberlayne (9 August 1843 – 17 May 1924) was a landowner in Hampshire and a member of parliament, serving the Southampton constituency three times, as an Independent and Conservative. He was deprived of his seat after the 1895 general election because of the indiscretion of one of his campaign workers and his having headed a procession which raised suspicion of having supplied beer to supporters. He subsequently raised the question of false electioneering statements in Parliament.

He was a member of the Carlton Club and the Royal Thames Yacht Club and a Justice of the Peace for Hampshire, as well as being Lord of the manors of Hound, North Baddesley, Woolston and Barton Peveril (near Eastleigh) in Hampshire and East Norton in Leicestershire.

== Early life and education ==
Chamberlayne was born at Pangbourne, Berkshire, the second son of Thomas Chamberlayne (1805–1876) and Amelia (née Onslow). He was educated at Eton and Magdalen College, Oxford, where he took his BA in 1865.

== Ancestry ==
His great uncle William Chamberlayne (1760–1829) was Member of Parliament for Southampton from 1818 until his death. Whilst serving the town, William Chamberlayne was also chairman of the company supplying gas lighting to the town of Southampton and donated the iron columns for the new gas street-lights. In 1822, the townspeople erected a memorial consisting of an iron Doric column; this now stands in Houndwell Park, near the city centre.

Tankerville's father, Thomas (1805–1876) was a keen yachtsman who sailed his yacht, Arrow, in the inaugural America's Cup race in 1851. He also played cricket for Hampshire and was a great hunting and coursing enthusiast, who built both new stables and a cricket pitch at the family home at Cranbury Park near Winchester.

Tankerville's mother, Amelia, was the daughter of Denzil Onslow (1770–1838), a General in the Grenadier Guards and an amateur cricketer.

Their first son, Denzil, became a captain in the 13th Light Dragoons, serving with distinction in the Crimean War, where he took part in the charge at Balaclava in 1854. Denzil died in 1873, leaving no heir, so on the death of Thomas in 1876, Tankerville succeeded his father.

At this time, the Chamberlayne family estates included the estate at Cranbury Park in the Parish of Hursley and the Weston Grove estate in Southampton which included the abbey at Netley. Chamberlayne resided at Weston Grove until after he retired from politics in 1906.

== Political career ==
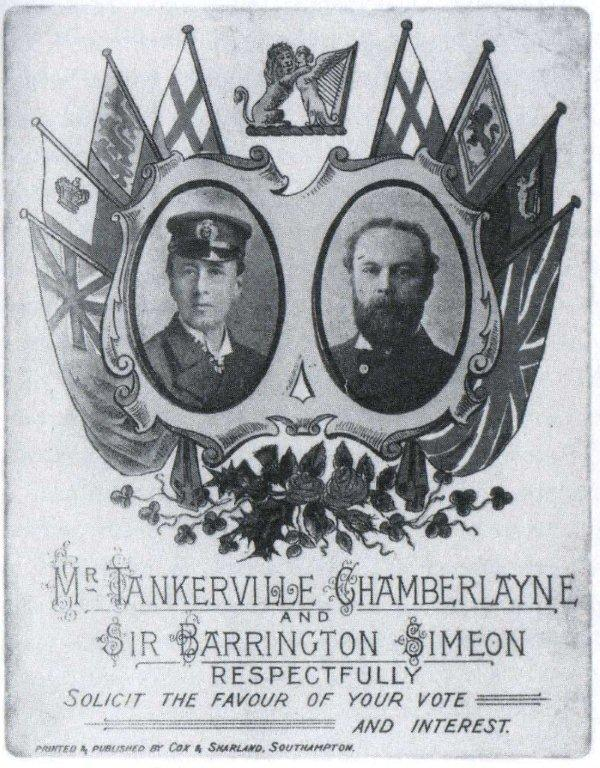
Poster (believed to be for 1895 UK General election) of Tankerville Chamberlayne (left) and Barrington Simeon

Chamberlayne was first elected as Member of Parliament for Southampton at the 1892 general election, when he headed the poll with 5,449 votes. He replaced the previous Conservative representative, Alfred Giles who was retiring from politics; his fellow M.P. for the town was Francis Evans, of the Liberal Party.

At the 1895 general election he stood for re-election on a joint ticket with Sir John Barrington Simeon of the Liberal Unionist Party. Although he retained his seat, the victory was challenged in an election petition lodged by two local Liberals, Walter Austen and John Rowland. The petitioners claimed that Chamberlayne and Simeon had been responsible for various corrupt and illegal practices, and had engaged in "treating" (supplying free food and drink to voters). The case came to trial at the Hartley Institute (now part of the University of Southampton) at the end of November 1895, and some of the claims were quickly disposed of: evidence that Chamberlayne had made a speech at Bitterne where he had slapped his pocket and alluded to money was regarded as untrustworthy by the judges. Other charges were abandoned by the petitioners.

The petition case came down to two main items. It was shown that Albert Blackman, chairman of Trinity Ward Conservative Association, had sent a telegram to Alfred Powell, a Southampton wood-carver who was working in Winchester, urging him "Every vote wanted. Come down by 6.35. Fare all right" and that Blackman had subsequently given Powell 2s. to pay his fare. Mr Justice Wright noted that such a payment was "made in direct contravention of the law", but that the judges could disregard it if the election was in other respects faultless.

The incident which decided the judges was called "the procession" and occurred on polling day. The Conservatives were campaigning in opposition to the Liberal government's Local Veto Bill which would have allowed local authorities to prevent the sale of alcohol. Several costermonger's carts, bearing "certain symbols of drink", headed by a carriage on which Chamberlayne sat, spent two hours moving through the streets of Southampton, stopping at pubs and Conservative supporting clubs. Although Chamberlayne had not known about the procession beforehand, Mr Justice Wright noted that he had chosen to lead it and therefore "allowed to follow him ..[a procession] of a nature calculated to excite and provoke to treating .. and to illegal practices to some extent". Mr Justice Bruce agreed that "it was, at least, possible, if not probable, that corrupt treating was going on". Therefore, both judges concluded that Chamberlayne had not taken all reasonable means to prevent corrupt practices, and his election was void; however, they refused to award the petitioners costs save in respect of the railway fare allegation.

=== Subsequent political career ===
A by-election was held on 22 February 1896, some six months after the general election. Chamberlayne, who was disqualified from election as a result of the successful petition, did not stand and Francis Evans regained his seat. The disqualification had expired by the time of the 1900 general election and Chamberlayne regained his seat. He was defeated at the 1906 general election by William Dudley Ward and Sir Ivor Philipps of the Liberal Party.

Although he stood for re-election in the 1910 general election, he was unsuccessful and his political career was over.

== Sporting interests ==
Chamberlayne was a keen sportsman and took an active interest in many sports, including cricket, rugby, football, fox hunting and yachting. He had a reputation for being very generous to the many sporting organisations who had claims on his patronage, although he did not actively involve himself with day-to-day details.

=== Cricket ===
He is recorded as having played in two cricket matches. The first was in July 1862 at Day's (Antelope) Ground, Southampton (which his father Thomas had helped to finance). In this match, Chamberlayne played for the Gentlemen of Hampshire against a United England Eleven. The Hampshire gentlemen fielded 22 players, including Thomas Chamberlayne, with Tankerville contributing just six runs in two innings. Despite their numerical inferiority (only fielding eleven players), the United England Eleven won the match by 64 runs.

He helped to finance a cricket ground at Yatton in Somerset and appeared there in the opening match in July 1879, when he played for the Gentlemen of Somerset against the Gentlemen of Hampshire. The match was curtailed because of inclement weather, but this did not prevent those present from enjoying the supper and fireworks that Chamberlayne laid on following the match.

The only other known match played at Yatton was in August 1887, when the Gentlemen of Gloucestershire entertained a touring team from Canada. The Gloucestershire gentlemen included W. G. Grace in their eleven with the match ending in a draw at the end of the second day.

=== Football ===
Although he never played football, he became very interested in the game as it increased in popularity. In 1884, he became president of the Trojans club in Eastleigh, having been vice-president for some years previously; he remained president of the Trojans until his death in 1924.

He was also President of the Freemantle Football Club and helped them financially by paying the rent (£24 per annum) on their ground in Freemantle. Following the failure of proposals to merge Freemantle with its neighbour, Southampton F.C. in 1897, Chamberlayne was invited to become a shareholder and director of the Southampton club. Although he accepted the offer, there is no record of him attending a meeting of either the board or of the shareholders.

=== Yachting ===
Amazon in 1889

Chamberlayne regularly sailed his father's yacht, the Arrow, which had taken part in the inaugural America's Cup race in 1851. In 1885, he had his own steam yacht, the Amazon, built at the "Arrow Yard" in Southampton; this yacht is still sailing in the 21st century and is listed on the National Historic Ships Register. In 1904, the Arrow Yard was sold to the neighbouring yard of Fay & Company, which was later absorbed by Camper and Nicholsons in 1912.

== Public benefactor ==
Chamberlayne was a generous supporter of various activities and causes. In 1897, to mark Queen Victoria's Diamond Jubilee he donated the recreation ground at Netley, near Southampton to the village. He and his wife also gave a party for the schoolchildren of Woolston at Weston Grove House.

As Lord of the manor, he funded the restoration of the chapel at the Leicestershire village of East Norton.

In 1902, he donated eight acres of land to create the Victoria Recreation Ground in Newport, Isle of Wight. The ground was laid out by the Newport Corporation, and dedicated to the public by Princess Henry of Battenberg, Governor of the Isle of Wight, on 28 August 1902.

In 1904, he donated land at Hursley Road, Chandler's Ford for the building of St. Boniface Church, laying the foundation stone on 1 April 1904.

In 1922, he transferred the ruins of Netley Abbey into the care of the Ministry of Works.

== Later life ==
Chamberlayne continued to live at Weston Grove after his political career had ended although he later moved to the family home at Cranbury Park, near Hursley outside Winchester.

In 1909, an Act of Parliament required that Chamberlayne sell 189 acres (76 ha) of land in Weston to the London and South Western Railway for the purpose of building an enormous dry dock some 1,600 ft long (490 m). Although the land was acquired, the project was never undertaken; the site was subsequently sold to the Ministry of Munitions and the Rolling Mills were built instead. Situated directly below Weston Grove House, the Rolling Mills building obstructed the view of Southampton Water from the house, which was demolished in 1940.

He was married to Edith Ashley, daughter of S.J. Ashley of Kidlington; their second son, Thomas Edmund Onslow Chamberlayne, was killed on 18 August 1916 at the Battle of the Somme, aged 23. He is remembered on the war memorial at North Baddesley in Hampshire.

Chamberlayne died in 1924 aged 80 and was succeeded by his eldest son, Tankerville Chamberlayne, born 1890; he also had four daughters.

== Legacy ==
Several streets in Southampton and Eastleigh are named after Chamberlayne and his family. These include Tankerville Road in Woolston and Chamberlayne Road in Eastleigh. There was also the former Tankerville School in Eastleigh and Chamberlayne College for the Arts in the Weston area (which is now named Weston Secondary School). There are Cranbury Roads in both Sholing and Eastleigh, as well as Cranbury Place, Cranbury Avenue, Onslow Road and Denzil Avenue in the Bevois Valley area of Southampton.

== Sources ==
- "Controverted Elections (Judgments). .. Copy of the shorthand writers' notes of the judgments delivered by the judges selected for the trial of election petitions", House of Commons Paper 63 of session 1896.
- J.S. Sandars, "Reports of the Decisions of the Judges for the trial of Election Petitions" [O'Malley and Hardcastle's Reports on Election Petitions, vol. V], Stevens and Haynes, London 1910. Cited as 5 O'M & H.

Parliament of the United Kingdom
Preceded by Sir Francis Henry Evans; Alfred Giles	Member of Parliament for Southampton; 1892–1895; With: Sir Francis Henry Evans to 1895; Sir John Simeon from 1895	Succeeded by Sir John Simeon, Bt; Sir Francis Henry Evans
Preceded by Sir John Simeon, Bt; Sir Francis Henry Evans	Member of Parliament for Southampton; 1900–1906; With: Sir John Simeon	Succeeded by Sir Ivor Philipps; William Dudley Ward
