= Sir John Simeon, 4th Baronet =

British politician

Coat of arms of Sir John Simeon, 4th Baronet
Crest A fox passant-reguardant Proper in the mouth a trefoil slipped Vert. Escutcheon Per fess Sable and Or a pale counterchanged in chief an ermine spot of the first between two trefoils slipped of the second and in base a like trefoil between two like ermine spots. Supporters Dexter a fox reguardant Proper in the mouth a trefoil slipped Vert, sinister a lion Gules ducally crowned Or. Motto Serviendo; Nec Temere Nec Timide

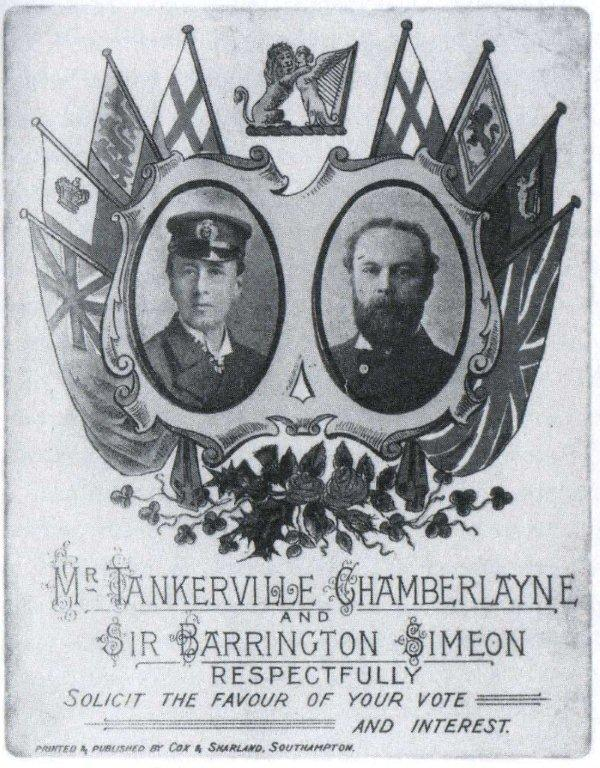
Poster (believed to be for 1895 UK General election) of Tankerville Chamberlayne (left) and Barrington Simeon

Sir John Stephen Barrington Simeon, 4th Baronet DL (31 August 1850 – 1909) was one of the two Members of Parliament (Note: Some larger cities returned two members elected on a single ballot.) for Southampton at the end of the 19th century and the start of the 20th century.

He was born at Swainston Manor (Note: A country estate totalling 8,800 acres.) in West Wight on 31 August 1850 and succeeded his father, the 3rd baronet, in 1870. He served as Ensign in the Rifle Brigade until he married Isabella Mary, daughter of the Hon Ralph Heanage Dutton, in 1872. The marriage was childless. In 1880 he became private secretary to the Rt Hon John Bright, MP, and entered parliament himself in 1895 as a Liberal Unionist. Shortly after his election he commissioned a private railway station at Watchingwell, some four miles (6 km) west of Newport. On 5 December 1903 he was appointed Honorary Colonel of the Southampton-based 1st Hampshire Royal Garrison Artillery (Volunteers).

Re-elected in 1900, Simeon left the House of Commons in 1906 and died three years later. He was succeeded as 5th baronet by his brother, Edmund Charles (1855–1915).

Honoured with permanent memorial, Simeon Monument in Castle Road, Newport. Isle of Wight.

== Notes ==
Parliament of the United Kingdom
Preceded by Francis Henry Evans; Tankerville Chamberlayne	Member of Parliament for Southampton; 1895 – 1906; With: Tankerville Chamberlayne to 1896; Sir Francis Henry Evans 1896–1900; Tankerville Chamberlayne 1900–1906	Succeeded by Sir Ivor Philipps; William Dudley Ward
Baronetage of the United Kingdom
Preceded by John Simeon	Baronet of Grazeley, Berkshire; 1870–1909	Succeeded by Edmund Charles Simeon
