= Dixon Kemp =

British naval architect

Dixon Kemp (1839 – 21 November 1899), a British naval architect, was a founder of the Yacht Racing Association (now the Royal Yachting Association) and at one time its secretary. He was a founder of Lloyd's Register of Yachts.

Kemp was born in Ryde, a British seaside town on the Isle of Wight. For a time, he edited the Isle of Wight Observer. He was also yachting editor of The Field.

Kemp was an authority on the design of yachts and yacht racing. Of his famous yachts, Firecrest (1892) was used by Alain Gerbault in his solo circumnavigation of the globe, and was the vessel he sailed to win the Blue Water Medal in 1923. His Amazon is still afloat and made a Trans-Atlantic crossing in 2011. The British Admiralty ordered copies of his Yacht and Boat Sailing supplied to the Navy. As an architect, he was regarded as an expert on stability of vessels, and his work was supplied to officers of the Royal Navy. As recently as a 1950 analysis of Joshua Slocum's vessel Spray, Kemp's formulae and analysis were still being put to use.

In yacht racing, he was known for having devised a new ranking system based on the length of vessels and their area under sail. Kemp also wrote concerning the rules of yacht racing.

== Works ==
- Yacht designing : a treatise on the practical application of the scientific principles upon which is based the art of designing yachts (1876)
- A manual of yacht and boat sailing (first published in 1878)
- Yacht architecture: a treatise on the laws which govern the resistance of bodies moving in water, propulsion by steam and sail; yacht designing; and yacht building (first published in 1885)
- Exposition of yacht racing rules: customs & practices observed in match sailing, including decisions on particular cases of protest (1898)

== Yachts ==
- Lapwing (1882)
- Amazon (1885)
- Firecrest (1892)
- Fauvette (1894)
- Beluga
