= Hursley =

Village and parish in Hampshire, England

Coordinates: 51.02279°N 1.39114°W

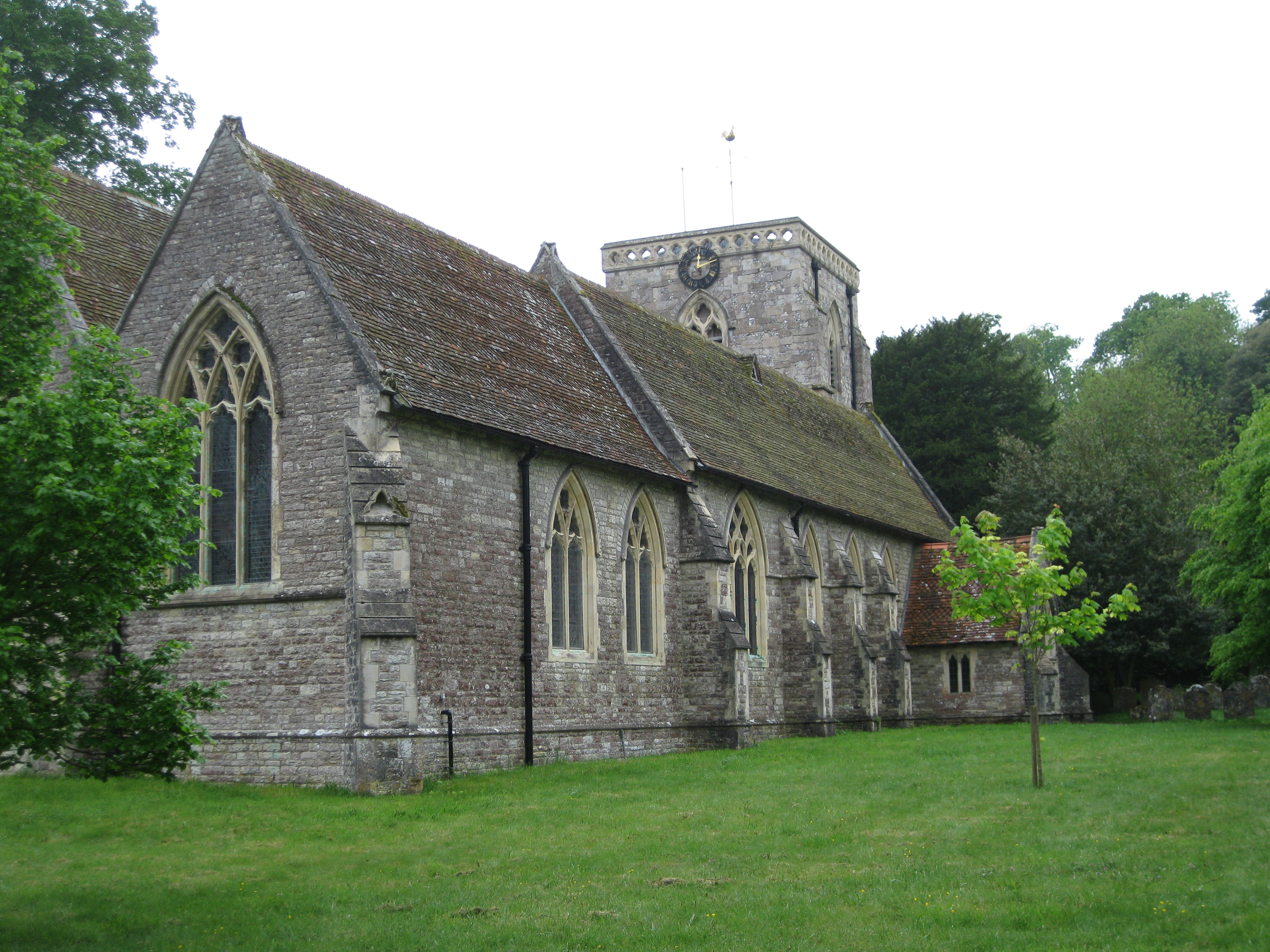
- All Saints, Hursley

- Location within Hampshire
- Population: 889 (2011 Census)
- OS grid reference: SU428250
- Civil parish: Hursley
- District: City of Winchester
- Shire county: Hampshire
- Region: South East
- Country: England
- Sovereign state: United Kingdom
- Post town: Winchester
- Postcode district: SO21, SO22
- Dialling code: 01962
- Police: Hampshire and Isle of Wight
- Fire: Hampshire and Isle of Wight
- Ambulance: South Central
- UK Parliament: Winchester

Hursley is a village and civil parish in Hampshire, England with a population of around 900 in 2011. It is located roughly midway between Romsey and Winchester on the A3090. Besides the village the parish includes the hamlets of Standon and Pitt and the outlying settlement at Farley Chamberlayne.

== History ==
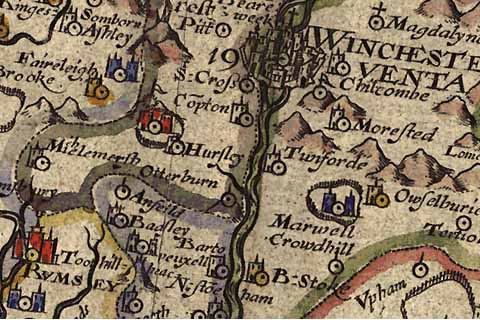
Map extract showing Hursley at centre, dated 1607

=== Prehistoric ===
Earthworks dating from either the late Bronze Age or early Iron Age are located at Merdon Castle.

=== 12th to 17th century ===
The earliest references to Hursley date from the late 12th century; Bishop of Winchester Henry de Blois built a manor house called Merdon Castle, within the parish, in 1138. In the 14th century the hundred of Buddlesgate expanded to include Hursley parish and surrounding dependencies. Hursley continued in the ownership of the Bishop of Winchester until 1552 when it was surrendered to King Edward VI.

The buildings had become ruinous by the 16th century, when Edward Vl granted the manor and park at Hursley to Sir Philip Hoby. Some remains, notably of a gatehouse, still stand, much overgrown, and were listed as a building at risk. In 2023, work was completed to have its loose stonework repointed and a layer of earth and grass added to its walls to protect it. Since then it has been removed from the "at-risk" list A 400-ft well was also made safe and capped at the scheduled monument. The works, costing nearly £300,000, were funded by the landowner and a £240,700 Historic England grant.

During the reign of Queen Mary the manor was briefly restored to the church but given back to the Hoby family by Elizabeth I.

The Hoby family sold the manor and castle to Thomas Clerke in 1600. The lodge and park at Hursley were leased separately at this time, but the two estates were brought together again in 1630 and sold in 1639 to Richard Major, High Sheriff of Hampshire for 1639–40.

=== The Cromwells – 1643 to 1718 ===
The estate passed into the Cromwell family in 1643 when Oliver Cromwell's son Richard married Dorothy Major, daughter of the owner, Richard Major.

Richard Cromwell lived with his wife in Hursley from 1649 until 1658 when he was proclaimed Lord Protector following the death of his father. This made Hursley briefly the country seat of the ruler of England. It was not to last however as Richard's grip on power was weak, he was forced from office within months and by 1660 concerns for his safety forced Richard Cromwell to flee the country with Dorothy. They travelled first to France and then to other parts of Europe where Richard lived under an assumed name. Richard's son Oliver Cromwell II (??-1705) took over the Hursley estate, and the tenants claimed their ancient rights and customs (including pasturage and felling trees) in a lengthy legal battle.

Richard returned to Hursley after Oliver died in 1705 and lived on as lord of the manor until he died in 1712 whereupon he was buried in the chancel of All Saints' Church, Hursley. Richard's daughters sold Hursley estate to Sir William Heathcote in 1718 for £35,100.

=== The Heathcotes – 1718 to 1888 ===
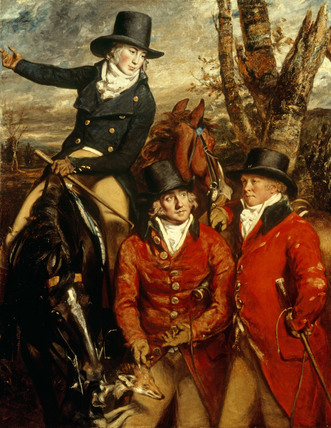
The Rev. William Heathcote (1772–1802), on horseback (son of the 3rd Baronet); Sir William Heathcote of Hursley, 3rd Baronet (1746–1819), holding his horse and whip; and Major Vincent Hawkins Gilbert, M.F.H., holding a Fox's mask. Daniel Gardner portrayed the three gentlemen on the hunt in 1790.

Heathcote, a baronet, was a successful merchant who moved to Hursley to take up the role of a country gentleman. Between the years of 1721 and 1724 he built a red brick Queen Anne style mansion (now known as Hursley House) on the site of the original hunting lodge.

William died in 1751 and the estate passed to his son, Sir Thomas Heathcote. About this time Hursley's original medieval parish church was rebuilt in a Georgian style. Sir Thomas was married twice and had eight children.

When he died he was succeeded by the second Sir William. William's son, also called Sir Thomas Heathcote, was a patron of the arts and modernised Hursley House, but was blamed by later Heathcotes for property blunders that eventually cost the family the estate.

William Heathcote, nephew to Thomas, became the fifth baronet in 1825. He extended Hursley House and also created Home Farm on the site of the old Merdon Castle. William was married twice, first to Caroline who bore him three sons and a daughter but died in 1835, and second to Selina in 1841 by whom he had another eight children.

In 1888 Selina Heathcote sold the estate after her husband's death for £150,000 to Joseph William Baxendale, of the Pickfords family. He in turn sold it in 1902 to George Cooper, whose wife Mary was a wealthy American railways heiress. She carried out extensive development and redecoration work in 1902 to create the house that can be seen today. Sir George was created a baronet in 1905 and on his death in 1940 the house was requisitioned by the Ministry of Aircraft Production.

Hursley House is now occupied by IBM as part of IBM Hursley Laboratories. It is a Grade Two* Listed Building.

Cranbury Park, a Grade One Listed Building in the parish of Hursley, now the home of the Chamberlayne-Macdonald family, was, in his later years, the one-time home of Sir Isaac Newton.

The MP Paulet St John raised an obelisk monument at Farley Chamberlayne to honour a favourite horse.

=== Other notable residents ===
The Church of England theologian and poet John Keble was appointed Vicar of Hursley in 1835, rebuilt the church in 1848, and remained there until his death in 1866. Keble was Professor of Poetry at Oxford University from 1831 to 1841, and was the originator and subsequently one of the leaders of the Oxford Movement. Keble College, Oxford was founded in his memory. Keble is buried at All Saints' Church, Hursley.

There is a memorial in the church to Dennis George Wyldbore Hewitt VC (1897–1917), a recipient of the Victoria Cross in World War I.

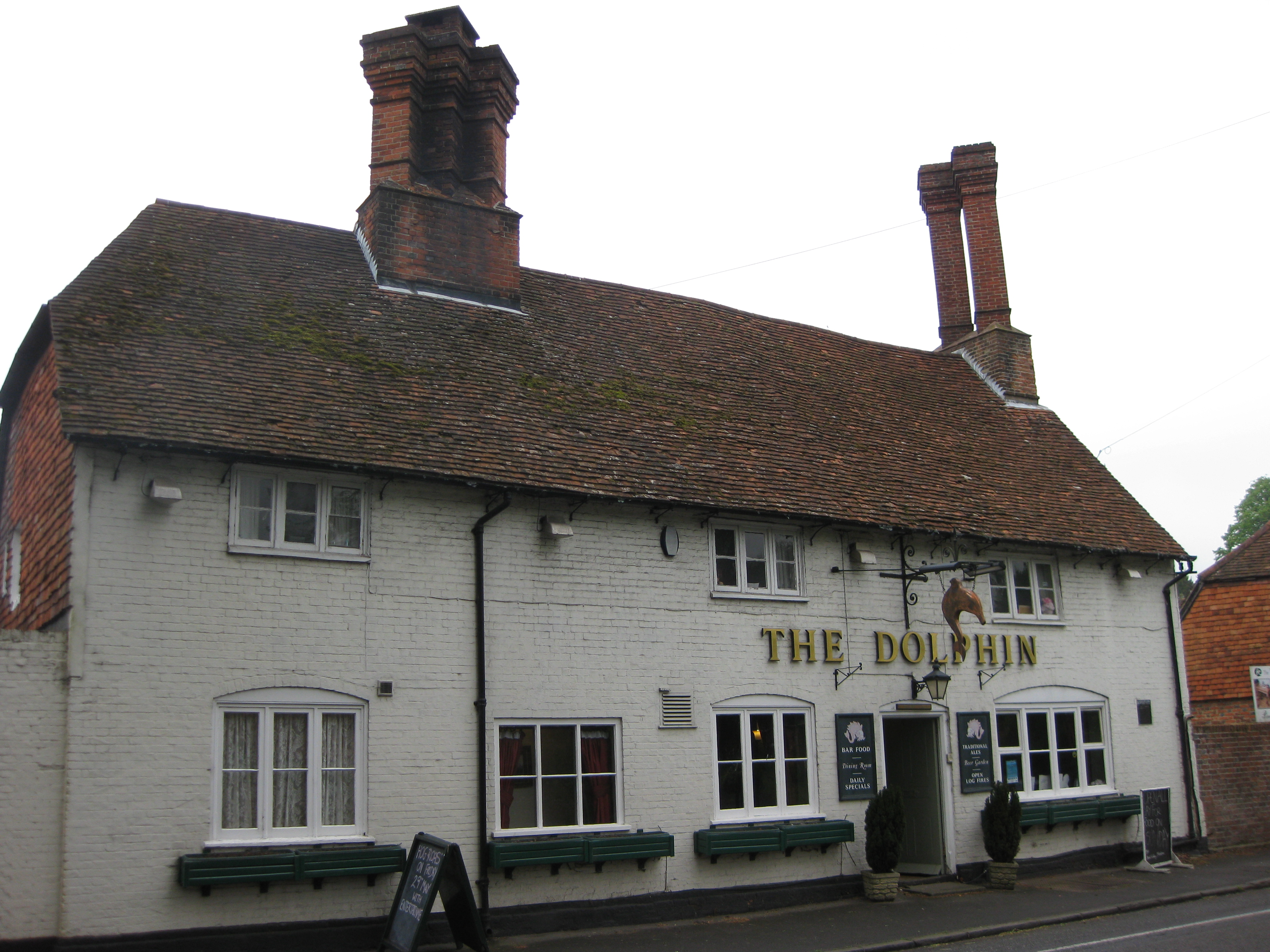
Dolphin Public House with its distinctive chimneys

== Present day ==
IBM has a site at Hursley, centred on Hursley House, employing over 1500 people. It is nowadays primarily a software development laboratory, specialising in transaction and message processing (CICS, MQ), Information Management, and Java. Storage adapters and storage virtualisation products (SVC) are also developed on this site. It is also home to IBM's Blockchain programme. In the past it was the development laboratory for several IBM 360 models and the first digital colour display, the IBM 3279 terminal. Hursley is crossed by the Monarch's Way long distance footpath. Hursley Park Cricket Club play at The Quarters, with the ground hosting two List A matches for the Hampshire Cricket Board in 2002.

== Listed Buildings and Scheduled Ancient Monuments ==
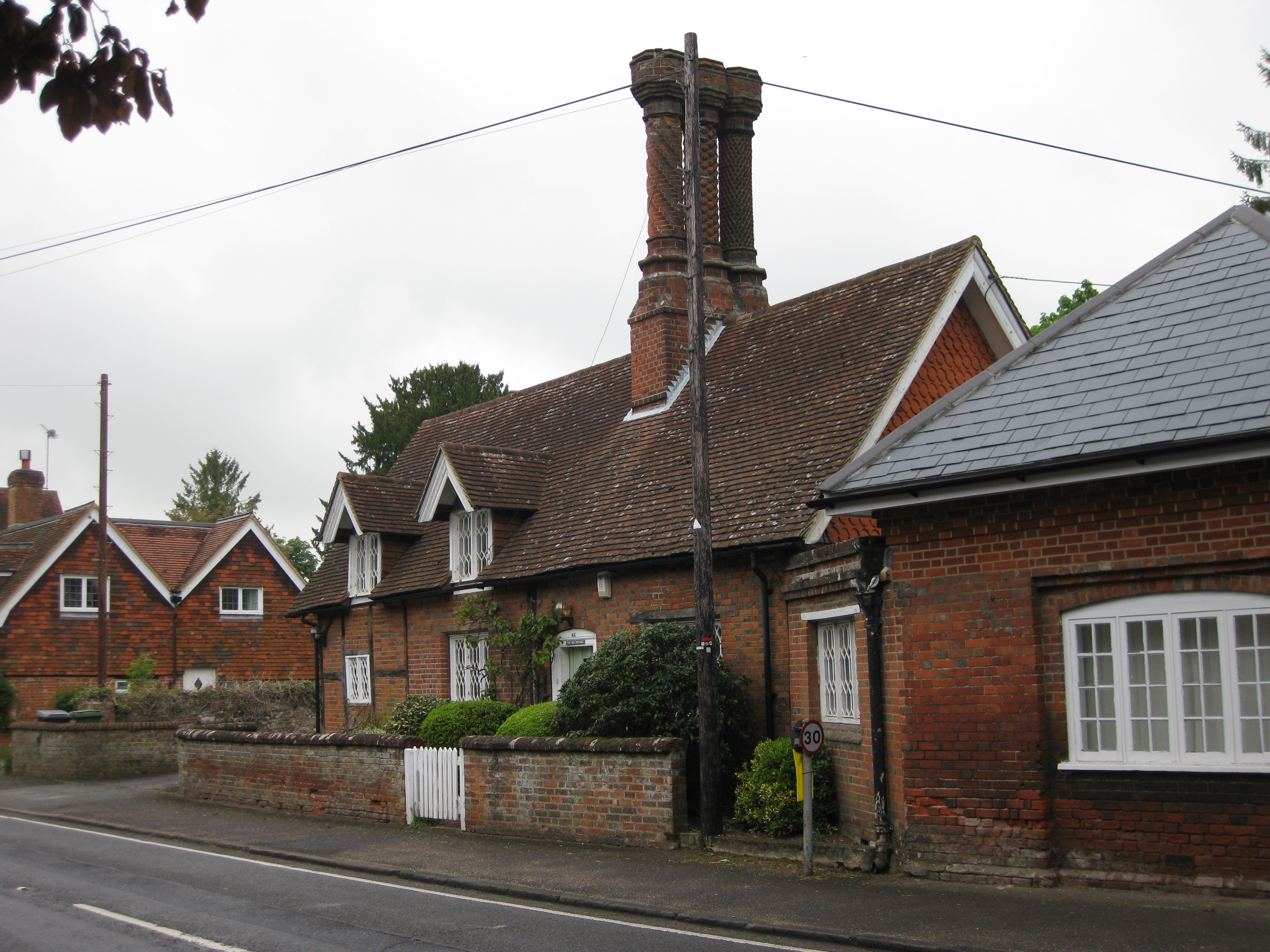
Cottages in Hursley, also with distinctive chimneys

Of the currently 128 entries for Hursley in the Statutory List of Buildings of Special Architectural or Historic Interest, St John's Church, Farley Chamberlayne and Cranbury Park are Grade One, and All Saints' Church, Hursley, Hursley House (now usually known as Hursley Park) and Slackstead Manor are Grade Two* Listed Buildings, the remaining 123 entries being Grade Two. Additionally there are three Scheduled Ancient Monuments: Merdon Castle, a Camp west of Farley Mount and a Length of deer-park boundary bank, Hursley Park.

The tower of All Saints’ Church dates from the 14th century, while some of the interior material appears to be 13th century at least in style The church underwent a major reconstruction in the late 1840s to a design by James Harrison. This work was commissioned by John Keble at a cost of £6000 and was paid for out of his book royalties.

== Geology ==
Hursley village is situated on the chalk at the northern edge of the Paleogene deposits of the Hampshire Basin; the chalk is largely overlain by head and 'clay with flints', insoluble material concentrated out of dissolved chalk. A number of dry valleys converge from the north. Immediately to the south of the village lies a belt of Palaeocene sandy clays of the Lambeth Group, sloping up to a ridge of Eocene clays and sandstones of the London Clay, Nursling and Whitecliff sands at Ladwell.
