= Merdon Castle =

Monument in Hampshire, England

- Hursley, United Kingdom
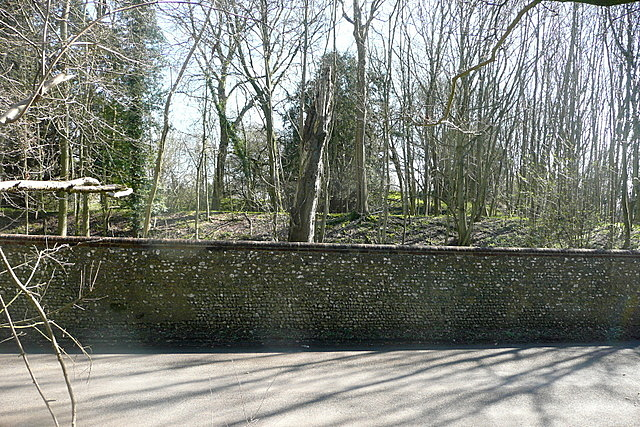

Site information
- Type: Castle

Location
- Coordinates: 51.036040°N 1.401187°W

Site history
- Built: Hillfort: 8th-5th centuries BC, Castle: 1129-1138
- Built by: Henry de Blois in 1129-1138
- Demolished: Partly demolished: 1155

Scheduled monument
- Official name: Merdon Castle
- Designated: 9 October 1981
- Reference no.: 1019123

Merdon Castle is the site of a scheduled monument located near the parish of Hursley, in Hampshire, United Kingdom.

== History ==
Initially, the hillfort dates to the Late Bronze Age or Early Iron Age (8th-5th centuries BC). Later, the castle was built between 1129 and 1138 by the Bishop of Winchester Henry de Blois, during the reign of his brother, Stephen. It was partly demolished in 1155 by the order of Henry II and was used as a palace of the Bishop. By the 14th century, the castle became ruinous and dilapidated. As of the late 18th century, only a fragment of the original flint tower remained visible. The monument was later used as a military camp in World War I, and World War II, and is represented as a series of earthworks and building foundations between the castle and hillfort ramparts on the southeast and west.

== Architecture ==
The hillfort is located on or near to hilltops. It is defined by a single line of earthworks and is considered small (3.7 ha). Its monument includes substantial motte and bailey castle built inside the ramparts of an older hillfort on a prominent south-facing chalk spur near Hursley. The defences include a single rampart and outer ditch, which are strengthened at the spur's neck by a small counterscarp bank. The ramparts have been modified around much of the circumference by later motte-and-bailey constructions, however best maintained in the northeast section, where the rampart stands 2 m above the interior and 4 m above the outer ditch. Internal features in the site include timber or stone roundhouses, storage pits, hearths, scattered postholes and gullies, and raised granaries indicated by postholes supporting square or rectangular structures.

Its later castle was built within the hillfort defences, including a large rampart and the outer ditch, which encloses an oval motte and a semicircular bailey to the south. The ramparts are most substantial around the motte, which rises up to 5 m above the interior and 12 m above the ditch. The motte stands 2-3 m above the bailey and features the flint lined well and a two-storey flint and stone tower located within a gap in the northern rampart.

A 1994 geophysical survey detected buried foundations of walls and buildings at the site, mainly within the inner ward of the ringwork.

=== Restoration and conservation ===
In 2023, Historic England gave a grant of over £240,700 to protect and repair the ruins of Merdon Castle. The monument was overgrown; however, those improvements stabilised and allowed it to be removed from the Heritage at Risk Register. The total project cost was about £288,840 and the landowner provided additional funding. The 400ft well was made safe and capped.

== Present ==
Today, the site of a scheduled monument is on private land and is closed to the public; however, the landowner organises regular community walks that allow people to see the site.
