= Amazon (yacht) =

Steam yacht built in 1885

- Amazon in 1889

History

United Kingdom
- Name: Amazon
- Builder: Tankerville Chamberlayne, Arrow Yard, Southampton
- Launched: 1885
- Status: Private yacht

General characteristics
- Type: Screw schooner, formerly steam yacht
- Tonnage: 58 GRT
- Displacement: 84 long tons (85 t) full load
- Length: 102 ft (31 m) (114 ft (35 m) over spar)
- Beam: 15.1 ft (4.6 m)
- Draft: 8.25 ft (2.51 m)
- Propulsion: Motor and sail
- Notes: Designer: Dixon Kemp

Amazon is a 102-foot (31 m) long screw schooner and former steam yacht built in 1885 at the private Arrow Yard of Tankerville Chamberlayne in Southampton.

Designer Dixon Kemp intended her to be 'fast and a good seaboat' and her successful sea trials were recorded in the several editions of his definitive Yacht Architecture (First edition published in 1885).

In 2011, Amazon was listed as one of the world's Top 40 Classic Yachts and was the oldest vessel honoured.

== Construction ==
Carvel planked in teak and pitch pine on oak frames, with alternate wrought iron strap floor reinforcement, bronze fastenings, lead keel and copper sheathing, the Amazon's hull is still largely original.

== History ==
Her builder and first owner, Tankerville Chamberlayne, an English gentleman, personally supervised her construction by his own Arrow Yard at Northam on the River Itchen. This small private facility was established by the Chamberlayne family for the maintenance of the famous cutter Arrow, which was adapted continuously and thereby kept racing competitively into the 1890s. Amazon's engine and boiler were supplied by the adjacent works of Day, Summers and Company.

Amazon was used for summer cruising, to attend sailing regattas along the south coast of England, and to visit France. Having been prepared appropriately for the occasion of Queen Victoria's Diamond Jubilee Royal Fleet Review in 1897 (at which Turbinia made her debut), she was shortly after sold to a prominent French yachtsman and was based at Saint Malo as Armoricain until 1900, when she returned to British ownership.

Amazon circa 1910

Already too old (and with a coal-fired compound engine thought to be rather too old-fashioned) for the First World War, she remained in south coast ports as a private yacht. A new owner took her to London and after 52 years of service her original engine and boiler were removed on her conversion to diesel in 1937. The Second World War put paid to pleasure cruising and she subsequently became a houseboat for some years in a west London Yacht Basin.

The actor Arthur Lowe bought her as a houseboat in 1968 and, encouraged by his surveyor's positive report, made her ready for sea again in 1971; at first a private yacht she then pursued a successful charter business in the 1980s, before migrating to northern Scotland in 1990.

In 1997 she made passage from Scotland to Malta, where her new owners used her for cruising in the Mediterranean. In 2009 Amazon crossed the Atlantic Ocean via the Cape Verde Islands and travelled in the Caribbean and to Bermuda.

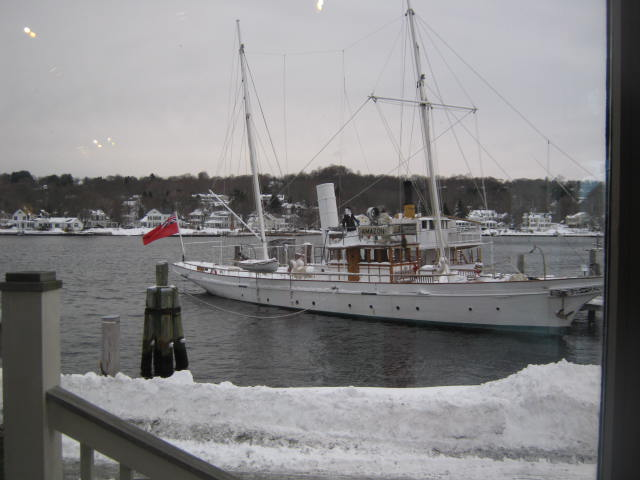
Amazon at Mystic Seaport, Connecticut, US, in December 2009.

Amazon arrived at Newport, Rhode Island, United States from Bermuda on Labor Day 2009. Amazon was hosted by the Herreshoff Marine Museum at Bristol, Rhode Island in October 2009. She spent time in Narragansett Bay. The yacht subsequently travelled to Mystic Seaport in late 2009 and was based there in early 2011. Amazon remained at Mystic Seaport until mid-2011.

Amazon was flagship for the commodore of the Mystic River Yacht Club for a charity regatta in Long Island Sound in June 2011 and visited Canada in July 2011

In August 2011 the yacht made a trans-Atlantic passage from Newfoundland to Ireland, and arrived at Waterford on 2 September 2011 where she was described by a local boat owner as the "classiest motor boat I have ever seen!". She remained at Waterford for the winter.

In May 2012 she visited Bristol before sailing to London, where she took part in the Thames Diamond Jubilee Pageant on Sunday 3 June 2012. She was the only vessel present that had also witnessed the Diamond Jubilee Fleet Review for Queen Victoria at Spithead on 26 June 1897. The Director of National Historic Ships referred to her in his public letter of criticism concerning the BBC's coverage of the event.

Amazon was subsequently at the Ramsgate Maritime Museum until late June, at Shoreham on 28 June 2012, then at Cowes and in the Bassin Vauban at St Malo, France in late July 2012.

In August and September 2012, Amazon was in the Channel Islands, visiting Alderney in August and Jersey in September, berthing in St Helier and Gorey Harbours; on 13 September she was in St Aubin's Bay to watch the 2012 Jersey International Air Display.

She was in Bristol during the winter and at the Southampton Maritime Festival on 5 & 6 May 2013.

On 23 May she was in the Bristol Channel en route to Gloucester, where she arrived on 24 May for the city's Tall Ships Festival on 25 & 26 May, and was on the Gloucester and Sharpness Canal during June. She was at Gorey, Jersey on 22 July 2013 and had returned to Malta by October that year.
