= William Sturges Bourne =

British politician

The Right Honourable William Sturges-Bourne

Home Secretary
- In office 30 April 1827 – 16 July 1827
- Monarch: George IV
- Prime Minister: George Canning
- Preceded by: Robert Peel
- Succeeded by: The Marquess of Lansdowne

First Commissioner of Woods and Forests
- In office 1827 – 11 February 1828
- Preceded by: The Earl of Carlisle
- Succeeded by: Charles Arbuthnot

Personal details
- Born: 7 November 1769
- Died: 1 February 1845 (aged 75) Testwood House, New Forest, Hampshire
- Party: Tory
- Education: Christ Church, Oxford

William Sturges-Bourne PC (7 November 1769 – 1 February 1845), known as William Sturges until 1803, was a British Tory politician. He was briefly Home Secretary under George Canning in 1827.

== Background and education ==
Born William Sturges, he was the only son of the Reverend John Sturges and his wife Judith (née Bourne). He was educated at Winchester College and Christ Church, Oxford, and was called to the bar at Lincoln's Inn in 1793. In 1803, Sturges inherited property from his uncle Francis Bourne, requiring him to add the surname Bourne to his own.

== Political career ==
At Oxford he became good friends with George Canning, who helped him become elected to parliament for Hastings in 1798. In Pitt's second government, Sturges Bourne became Secretary to the Treasury, and, after a period out of government during the Ministry of All the Talents, he became a Lord of the Treasury from 1807 to 1809, retiring along with his ally Canning from the government. Sturges Bourne left parliament after the 1812 general election, but, due again to Canning's influence, became a Privy Councillor in 1814, and returned to parliament for Bandon Bridge in 1815. In 1814 he became a commissioner on the Board of Control, remaining in this office until 1822. He also served from 1818 to 1819 as Chairman of a Committee to reform the Poor Laws, which was successfully carried out as the Sturges Bourne Acts.

Although he retired from government in 1822 due to a large inheritance, he returned to government as Home Secretary when Canning became prime minister in April 1827. He only served briefly in this post, becoming instead First Commissioner of Woods and Forests when the Whig grandee Lord Lansdowne joined the ministry as Home Secretary a few months later. He was offered the Chancellorship of the Exchequer several times by Canning's successor Lord Goderich, but turned it down, leading Colonial Secretary William Huskisson to accuse him of sabotaging the ministry. Sturges Bourne retired from government with Wellington's accession as premier in February 1828. Sturges Bourne supported Catholic emancipation, but opposed the Whig Reform Bill, and retired from parliament in 1831. In his later career, he served as a member of the Royal Commission on the Poor Laws.

He was elected a Fellow of the Royal Society in April 1826

== Family ==
Sturges Bourne married Anne, third daughter of Oldfield Bowles, in 1808. He died at Testwood House, New Forest, Hampshire, in February 1845, aged 75.

Parliament of Great Britain
Preceded by Sir James Sanderson; Nicholas Vansittart	Member of Parliament for Hastings; 1798–1802; With: Nicholas Vansittart	Succeeded by Sylvester Douglas; George Gunning
Parliament of the United Kingdom
Preceded by William Chamberlayne; William Stewart Rose	Member of Parliament for Christchurch; 1802–1812; With: William Stewart Rose	Succeeded by William Edward Tomline; William Stewart Rose
Preceded by Richard Boyle Bernard	Member of Parliament for Bandon; 1815–1818	Succeeded by Augustus Clifford
Preceded by George Rose; William Edward Tomline	Member of Parliament for Christchurch; 1818–1826; With: George Henry Rose	Succeeded by George Henry Rose; George Pitt Rose
Preceded by Sir Lawrence Palk, Bt; John Copley	Member of Parliament for Ashburton; 1826–1830; With: Sir Lawrence Palk, Bt	Succeeded by Charles Arbuthnot; Sir Lawrence Palk, Bt
Preceded by John Henry North; Arthur Chichester	Member of Parliament for Milborne Port; 1830–1831; With: George Stevens Byng	Succeeded by Richard Lalor Sheil; George Stevens Byng
Political offices
Preceded by John Sargent	Secretary to the Treasury; 1804–1806	Succeeded by John King
Preceded by Robert Peel	Home Secretary; 1827	Succeeded by The Marquess of Lansdowne
Preceded by The Earl of Carlisle	First Commissioner of Woods and Forests; 1827–1828	Succeeded by Charles Arbuthnot
