= William Rose (Clerk of the Parliaments) =

British Clerk of the Parliaments

The Right Honourable Sir William Rose KCB DL JP
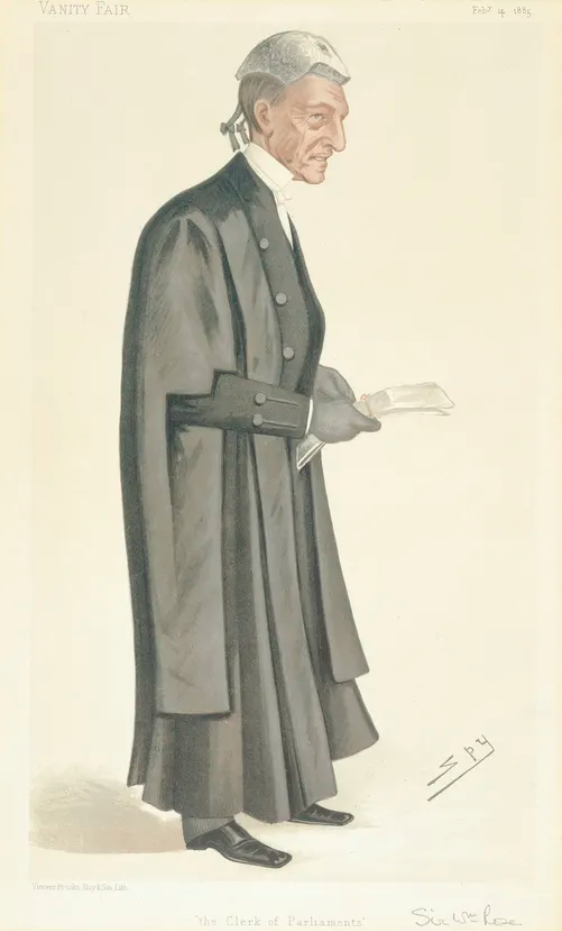
- Sir William Rose from Vanity Fair by Sir Leslie Ward

Clerk of the Parliaments
- In office 1875–1885
- Preceded by: Sir John Lefevre
- Succeeded by: Sir Henry Graham

Personal details
- Born: 19 July 1808 Sandhills, Christchurch, Dorset
- Died: 19 November 1885 (aged 77) Hill Street, Berkeley Square, London
- Spouse: Hon. Sophia Thellusson
- Parents: Sir George Henry Rose GCH (father); Frances Duncombe (mother)
- Education: Eton College; St John's College, Cambridge

Sir William Rose KCB DL JP (19 July 1808 – 19 November 1885) was a British barrister and civil servant who served as Clerk of the Parliaments from 1875 to 1885, succeeding his father.

From a Tory background, he was well-connected in the political world.

== Early life ==
Rose was born the son of Sir George Henry Rose and Frances Duncombe. He was from a strongly political family, descended from the Roses of Kilravock, directly from William Rose, 11th Baron of Kilravock, he was the grandson of George Rose and Thomas Duncombe, nephew of William Stewart Rose, younger brother of Field Marshal Hugh Rose, 1st Baron Strathnairn GCB, GCSI, PC and cousin of Charles Duncombe, 1st Baron Feversham and Thomas Slingsby Duncombe. He was educated at Eton College and St John's College, Cambridge, where he graduated from in 1830 with a Bachelor of Arts degree. He was admitted to The Honourable Society of Lincoln's Inn on 23 November 1832 and was called to the bar in 1839.

== Parliamentary career ==
In 1848 Rose was appointed Deputy Clerk of the Parliaments by his father, who was then Clerk of the Parliaments. George Henry Rose had been appointed Clerk of the Parliaments after serving as Deputy Clerk of the Parliaments, and was appointed by his own father, George Rose. While still Deputy Clerk, On 14 October 1865 William Rose was appointed Knight Commander of the Order of the Bath. On 22 April 1875 Rose was appointed Clerk of the Parliaments. Rose served as Clerk until his death in 1885 at which point he was succeeded by Sir Henry Graham.

He was a beloved part of parliament, and many paid tribute to him, including the Marquess of Salisbury who said amongst other comments "His manner and kindness to all the Members of this House are well known." and paid tribute to his "zeal, ability, diligence, and integrity" and to his "service of this House during a period of 50 years." The Earl of Kimberley stated of him: "anyone more obliging, more attentive to his duties, or more anxious to assist everyone to obtain information, I think none of us have ever known."

== Personal life ==
Rose married the Hon. Sophia Maria Andalusia Thellusson, daughter of John Thellusson, 2nd Baron Rendlesham and his wife Ann Sophia Tatnall, of Leiston Old Abbey in Suffolk.

Rose and his wife Sophia took over her mother's family house at Leiston Old Abbey, Suffolk. He was appointed Justice of the Peace of Suffolk and Deputy Lieutenant of Berkshire. Rose's older brother, Hugh Rose, 1st Baron Strathnairn died just over a month before him on 16 October 1885 and left his estate between Sir William Rose and their nephew, Admiral the Hon. George Douglas. He died on 19 November 1885 at his London house, at 15 Hill Street, Berkeley Square, his wife outlived him by 25 years, dying on 13 November 1900 at their family house, Leiston Old Abbey, Suffolk.

Government offices
Preceded by Sir John Lefevre	Clerk of the Parliaments; 1875–1885	Succeeded by Sir Henry Graham
