= William Stewart Rose =

British poet, translator and Member of Parliament (1775–1843)

William Stewart Rose (1775–1843) was a British poet, translator and Member of Parliament, who held Government offices. From a Tory background, he was well-connected in the political and literary world, and made a mark by his championing of Italian poets and a burlesque style of verse based on their influence as satirists.

== Life ==
Rose was born the second son of George Rose of Cuffnells near Lyndhurst in Hampshire, a senior civil servant and MP, and his wife Theodora Duer; George Henry Rose was his elder brother. He was educated at Hyde Abbey School under Charles Richards, and Eton College. He matriculated at St John's College, Cambridge in 1794, leaving without a degree, and entered Lincoln's Inn in 1796. He was uncle to Hugh Rose, 1st Baron Strathnairn, Sir William Rose and the Countess of Morton.

Rose was successively appointed Surveyor of Green-wax Monies (1797–1800), Clerk of Pleas at the Exchequer (1797–1837) and Reading Clerk to the House of Lords (1800–1824). He was also the Member of Parliament (MP) for Christchurch from 1796 to 1800, partnering his father. His post as Clerk of Pleas was considered by William Cobbett to be a sinecure; and Nathaniel Wraxall saw Rose's appointments as an example of his father's nepotism. In any case Rose treated all his posts as sinecures.

In 1803 he became Major-Commandant of the Prince of Wales's New Forest Rangers, one of the Volunteer corps formed after the breakdown of the Peace of Amiens. In 1809 the unit was incorporated into the South-West Hampshire Local Militia based at Romsey and commanded by the future Prime Minister Lord Palmerston, who was Secretary at War. Rose retained his position as major in the regiment.

During 1814–5 Rose travelled in continental Europe, while Napoleon was on Elba. On this trip he suffered an attack of apoplexy in Verona, reported in a letter of Countess of Albany to Ugo Foscolo, saying he had lost the use of one side, and had gone to the baths at Abano Terme. Rose helped Foscolo come to the United Kingdom in 1816, enlisting the support of Stratford Canning. In 1817 Rose went to the Veneto, for about a year.

Suffering a stroke in 1824, Rose retired on a pension from his House of Lords post. He suffered from paralytic attacks. In these years he lived in Brighton. He had London visitors, and a friend in the Rev. Charles Townsend (1789–1870), a minor poet, curate at Brighton then St Peter's Church, Preston, from 1837 rector at Kingston-by-the-Sea: Townsend wrote the brief memoir for the 1864 edition of Rose's Ariosto translation. Charles Macfarlane, an admirer who became a friend, met Rose at an evening in Brighton given by Horace Smith in 1827.

Henry Crabb Robinson's diary records Rose at a breakfast given by Samuel Rogers, 6 January 1834: "a deaf and rheumatic man, who looks prematurely old". Eventually there was a mental decline: according to Rogers, Rose was an imbecile by the time of his death in Brighton, on 29 April 1843.

== Associations ==
In 1803 Rose met Walter Scott in London. They became friends, and it was through Rose that Scott came to know John Bacon Sawrey Morritt. Scott addressed to Rose the introductory poem of Marmion in 1808, from his house Ashestiel, Ettrick Forest.

Rose was associated with wits of the Anti-Jacobin circle, such as George Canning and John Hookham Frere, Tories who also gravitated to the group around the Quarterly Review. They were interested in the burlesque aspects of Italian poetry. Another possible influence on Rose was John Herman Merivale, translator of Luigi Pulci.

Frere met Lord Byron in Seville in 1809; and Rose knew Byron from encounters in 1817–8 in Venice. Beppo: A Venetian Story was Byron's 1818 poem which in terms of style and tone, and the use of ottava rima, owed something to the "Whistlecraft" Arthurian burlesque published by Frere, for Rose, as Prospectus and Specimen of an intended National Work (1817), and later (after expansion) known as The Monks and the Giants (1818). The digressive and satiric style was then worked out more completely in Don Juan. Byron understood that Rose was the author. Given the Tory provenance, from political opponents, of the "Whistlecraft" verse, Byron was as much provoked to competition as influenced.

Frere initially thought Beppo was by Rose. Rose, in his verse epistle to Frere, published 1834, called Frere "father of his [Byron's] final song", with a footnote:

In which I comprehend Beppo and Don Juan, and to warrant my assertion, it is fitting I should mention that Lord Byron made this avowal to me at Venice, and said he should have inscribed Beppo to him that had served him as a model, if he had been sure it would not have been disagreeble, supposing (as I conclude) that some passages in it might have offended him.

Despite his Tory background, and personal connection to followers of William Pitt the younger, Rose came to join the Holland House set of Whigs.

== Works ==
Rose's major work was the translation of the Orlando Furioso of Ariosto, into English verse with notes, that he made in the years 1823 to 1831. The publisher John Murray II, seeing the success of Beppo as setting a new literary trend, commissioned the work, on which Rose had already made a start, for part publication. There was a later edition in the Bohn Library (1864, 2 vols.). Margaret Fuller told Charles Sumner in the 1840s that Rose's translation, better than the one he had been reading by John Hoole, was in fact the best. A modern view calls it "lumpen and over-literal", and it is not preferred to the Elizabethan version of John Harington.

The Court and Parliament of Beasts (1819), was a free verse translation from Gli Animali Parlanti of Giovanni Battista Casti. Philip Hobsbaum in the Oxford Dictionary of National Biography called this animal tale Rose's main claim to critical attention. It is divided into seven cantos, each prefaced by a personal dedication. The dedications were addressed, in order, to: Ugo Foscolo; John Hookham Frere (called "our British Berni"); his Hampshire house Gundimore; Henry Hallam; Bartholomew Frere; Sir Robert Ainslie, 1st Baronet; and Walter Scott. The 1819 edition by John Murray was preceded by a limited one, by William Bulmer (1816), which Rose may have shown Byron who knew the work by 1818.

Other works were:

- The Naval History of the Late War (1802, vol.1 only)
- A translation of Amadis de Gaul (1803). This was in rhymed verse, and a free and concise translation from the first three books of the French romance (from the Spanish) by Herberay des Essarts. Rose added notes, in the style of Gregory Lewis Way, editor of French fabliaux.
- A translation of Partenopex de Blois (1807), from the French of Pierre Jean-Baptiste Legrand d'Aussy. Benjamin Disraeli lampooned Rose in Vivian Grey as Partenopex Puff.
- The Crusade of St. Louis and Edward the Martyr (1810), ballads.
- Apology, or Anecdotes of Monkeys (1815)
- The Prospectus and Specimen of an Intended National Work (1817), pseudonymous. It was published for Rose by John Hookham Frere, as by William and Robert Whistlecraft. See above.
- Letters from the North of Italy (1819, 2 vols.), travel writing. The discursive letters were addressed to Henry Hallam. They include pro-Napoleon sentiments, and mention the satirical poet Giuseppe Parini.
- Translation into prose, with some verse passages, of the Orlando Innamorato of Boiardo, from the Italian prose of Francesco Berni, 1823. This work amounted to a dry run for the Orlando Furioso translation, and was prompted by Henry Vassall-Fox, 3rd Baron Holland.
- Thoughts and Recollections by One of the Last Century (1825), essays, anonymous; contains an essay on translation.
- Epistle to the Right Honourable John Hookham Frere in Malta (1834), verse letter,
- Rhymes (1837)

Rose wrote five articles in the Quarterly Review, in 1812–3 and 1826.

== Family ==
From 1817, for around a year, Rose was in Venice, and there began in 1818 a relationship with a married woman, Countess Marcella Maria Condulmer Zorzi. She returned to England with him, and they lived as man and wife. After her husband had died, they were married in 1835, in Brighton, where they had settled. They had no children.

Parliament of Great Britain
Preceded by Hans Sloane; George Rose	Member of Parliament for Christchurch; 1796–1800; With: George Rose	Succeeded by William Chamberlayne; George Rose
