= William Torr =

English agriculturist

- Born: 22 December 1808; Riby, North Lincolnshire
- Died: 12 December 1874 (aged 65)
- Occupation: Agriculturist

William Torr (22 December 1808 – 12 December 1874) was an English agriculturist.

== Biography ==
Torr came from a family of yeomen which had been settled for several generations at Riby in North Lincolnshire. There he was born on 22 December 1808. His education was interfered with by a severe strain affecting the spine while pole-jumping. After leaving school he travelled through various parts of Great Britain and the continent, laying the foundation of that thorough knowledge of farming and stock-breeding which distinguished him through life. Torr began farming in his native parish of Riby in his twenty-fifth year (1833); in 1848 he moved to the Aylesby Manor Farm, which during the preceding eighty years had been celebrated for its breed of Leicester sheep. Its reputation was successfully maintained and increased under Torr's management. From the Aylesby flocks and herds animals were largely purchased for transmission to all parts of the United Kingdom, to the continent, the colonies, and even Japan. In 1854 he also took a farm of 420 acres at Rothwell. In 1856 he succeeded his uncle in the occupation of the Riby Grove Farm. The total area of these three farms was over 2,400 acres, the management of the whole of which he himself personally conducted. An exhaustive account of Torr's farming, written by H. M. Jenkins, secretary of the society, was published in the ‘Journal of the Royal Agricultural Society,’ 1869 (2nd ser. v. 415). It dealt with his farm management in all its bearings, fences, drainage, arable land, cattle, sheep, pigs, cart horses, manures, labour, steam cultivation, mechanical work, and farm accounts.

The principal feature of Torr's farm consisted in his breeds of live stock. He was especially proud of his flock of Leicester sheep. He had also a stud of thoroughbred ponies, largely partaking of Arab blood, which had been bred at Riby since 1804. But what gives Torr's name its importance in the history of agriculture is, above all, his breed of shorthorn cattle. "It takes any man thirty years to make a herd and bring it to one's notions of perfection", is said to have been one of his maxims, and almost exactly that space of time elapsed between 1844 and 1845, when Torr began to lay the foundations of his herd by hiring bulls from Richard Booth of Worlaby, another shorthorn breeder of the time, and September 1875, when eighty-four animals, all bred (for several generations) on his farm, were sold, in the presence of a company of something like three thousand persons, for the price of 42,919l. 16s. This sale resulted in the scattering of Torr's herd over the whole of the United Kingdom.

His reputation as an agriculturist was throughout life widespread. He acted as judge of live stock in the principal agricultural shows of the three kingdoms, and even in those held at Paris under the patronage of Napoleon III.

He became a member of the Royal Agricultural Society in 1839, the year after its foundation, and continued through life to be closely connected with it. In May 1857 he was elected on the council. He was a frequent member of the inspection committee appointed to visit the sites offered for the annual country meetings, and was one of the judges of farms in the first competition carried out under the auspices of the society in connection with the Oxford meeting of 1870. Besides his labours in connection with the Royal Agricultural Society, Torr was an active member and trustee of the Smithfield Club, as well as honorary director of the Lincolnshire Agricultural Society. His experience as a producer of beef and mutton caused him to be summoned before several of the select committees of the House of Commons on the subjects of the various means of transport of live cattle and dead meat which have been appointed since the cattle plague of 1865. He was the inventor of many improvements in the details of farm management, of one of the first convex mould-board ploughs, of a farm gate (to which was awarded a prize at the Warwick meeting of the Royal Agricultural Society in 1859), of a spring wagon, and of a pig-trough.

Torr entertained ‘strong objections to everything in the shape of paper farming.’ This expression he himself used in introducing a lecture on ‘Sheep versus Cattle,’ delivered at a meeting of the weekly council of the Royal Agricultural Society on 20 June 1866. A full report of this address, given in the ‘Journal of the Royal Agricultural Society,’ 2nd ser. ii. 549, is almost the only one of his utterances which has been preserved. He was, however, a brilliant talker. ‘As he rode he lectured; one question was sufficient to bring out an essay.’ He died at Aylesby Manor on 12 December 1874, and was buried in Riby churchyard.

After the Gainsborough show of the North Lincolnshire Society in 1864 a life-size painting by Knight was presented to him by his Lincolnshire friends in recognition of his eminent services in the advancement of agriculture. This picture was later in the possession of his nephew, the successor to the property.
