= Hans Sloane (MP) =

British politician

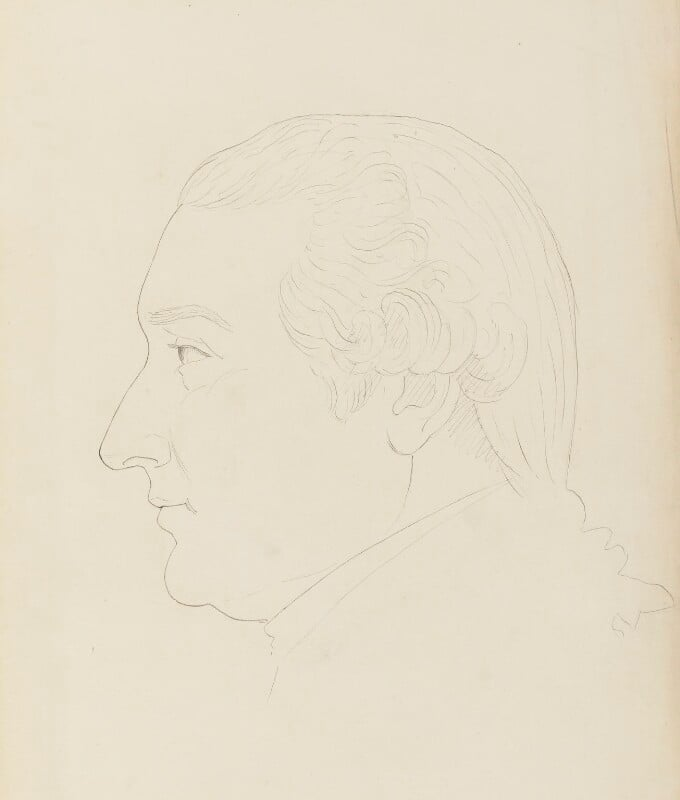
- Portrait of Sloane by Francis Leggatt Chantrey, c. 1817
- Born: 14 November 1739; South Stoneham, Hampshire, U.K.
- Died: 1827 (aged 87–88)
- Education: Newcome's School
- Alma mater: Trinity College, Cambridge
- Occupation: Politician
- Spouse: Sarah Fuller
- Children: 5 sons (including William Sloane-Stanley), 2 daughters
- Relatives: Sir Hans Sloane (paternal great-great-uncle); John 'Mad Jack' Fuller (cousin)

Hans Sloane (14 November 1739 – 1827), later called Hans Sloane-Stanley, was a politician who sat in the House of Commons between 1768 and 1806.

== Early life ==
Hans Sloane was born on 14 November 1739 at South Stoneham, Hampshire. He was educated at Newcome's School, Trinity College, Cambridge and the Inner Temple. He was the great-nephew of noted physician and collector Sir Hans Sloane, Bart., and first cousin of John 'Mad Jack' Fuller, who was also a Member of Parliament for Southampton in 1780. Another relative was Hans Stanley, grandson of Sir Hans Sloane, who guided his early career.

== Career ==
Sloane was commissioned as a Lieutenant in the North Hampshire Militia when it was first embodied under the command of Hans Stanley in 1759, and was promoted to Captain in 1760 and to Lieutenant-Colonel the following year. He became Colonel of the regiment in 1780 and held the position until he resigned in 1800.

Stanley was influential in the Isle of Wight, and found Sloane a parliamentary seat there, having him elected as Member of Parliament for Newport (Isle of Wight) in 1768. From 1770 to 1782, he was also Stanley's deputy as Cofferer of the Household.

Sloane was later also MP for Southampton from 1780 to 1784, Christchurch from 1788 to 1796 and Lostwithiel, Cornwall, from 1796 to 1802, and a junior Lord of Trade from 1780 to 1782 (when he lost office with the fall of Lord North's government).

== Personal life ==
On 24 June 1772, Sloane married Sarah Fuller, the daughter of Stephen Fuller and Elizabeth Noakes. They had five sons and two daughters. On the death of Hans Stanley in 1780, Sloane had inherited his estate of Paultons, near Romsey, subject to the life interest of Stanley's two sisters, and in recognition of this he adopted the additional surname of Stanley in 1821.

== Death and legacy ==
Sloane died in 1827. There is a memorial to Sarah in South Stoneham church.

Parliament of Great Britain
Preceded by William Rawlinson Earle; Thomas Dummer	Member of Parliament for Newport (Isle of Wight); 1768–1780; With: John Eames 1768–73; Hon. John St John 1773–74; Sir Richard Worsley 1774–80	Succeeded by Sir Richard Worsley; Hon. John St John
Preceded by John Fleming; John Fuller	Member of Parliament for Southampton; 1780–1784; With: John Fuller	Succeeded by John Fleming; James Amyatt
Preceded by James Harris; John Frederick	Member of Parliament for Christchurch; 1788–1796; With: John Frederick 1788–1790; George Rose 1790–1796	Succeeded by George Rose; William Stewart Rose
Preceded by George Smith; Reginald Pole-Carew	Member of Parliament for Lostwithiel; 1796–1800; With: William Drummond	Succeeded by Parliament of the United Kingdom
Parliament of the United Kingdom
Preceded by Parliament of Great Britain	Member of Parliament for Lostwithiel; 1801–1806; With: William Drummond 1801–1802; William Dickinson 1802–1806	Succeeded by William Dickinson; The Viscount Lismore
