= George Pitt Rose =

British Clerk of the Parliaments

The Rt. Hon. Major George Pitt Rose MP

Member of Parliament for Christchurch
- In office 1826–1832 Serving with George Henry Rose
- Preceded by: George Henry Rose; William Edward Tomline
- Succeeded by: Sir George Tapps-Gervis, Bt

Personal details
- Born: 7 January 1797
- Died: 19 September 1851 (aged 54) Winchester
- Spouse: Phoebe Susannah Vesey
- Parents: Sir George Henry Rose GCH (father); Frances Duncombe (mother)
- Education: Eton College; St John's College, Cambridge
- Military career
- Allegiance: United Kingdom
- Branch: British Army
- Rank: Major
- Unit: 15th The King's Hussars

Major George Pitt Rose MP (7 January 1797 – 19 September 1851) was a British politician and soldier who served as MP for Christchurch. From a Tory background, he was well-connected in the political world.

== Early life ==
Rose was born to George Henry Rose and Frances Duncombe, daughter of Thomas Duncombe of Duncombe Park, Yorkshire, one of the wealthiest young women in the country. He went up to St John's College, Cambridge in 1815.

== Career ==
Rose joined the 15th Hussars as a Cornet in 1822, was promoted to Lieutenant in 1824, to Captain in 1826 and Major in 1841. Later in 1847 he was also appointed Captain in the 5th Foot. Meanwhile in 1826 his father who was already Member of Parliament for Christchurch brought Rose along to serve as his second MP for the Christchurch constituency, Rose was elected as Tory MP for Christchurch in the 1826 General Election and served through the 1830 United Kingdom general election and the 1831 United Kingdom general election.

== Personal life ==
Rose was married on 30 April 1828 to Phoebe Susannah Vesey, daughter of Maj.-Gen. John Agmondesham Vesey, they had one son together, George Ernest Rose. George Ernest Rose followed him into the army, saw active service in the Crimea and acted as an aide-de-camp to his uncle General Hugh Rose during the Indian mutiny. He died at Calcutta, 'aged 27', in 1865.

Rose died intestate in Winchester on 19 September 1851, his wife and son were allowed provision from a trust fund of some £22,000 in his father's will drawn up later that year and proved on 9 July 1855, in addition to an annuity settled on his wife in 1833.

== Notes ==
- Hansard 1803–2005: contributions in Parliament by George Pitt Rose

Parliament of the United Kingdom
Preceded by George Henry Rose; William Edward Tomline	Member of Parliament for Christchurch; 1826 – 1832; With: George Henry Rose	Succeeded by Sir George Tapps-Gervis, Bt
