= George Henry Rose =

British politician and diplomat

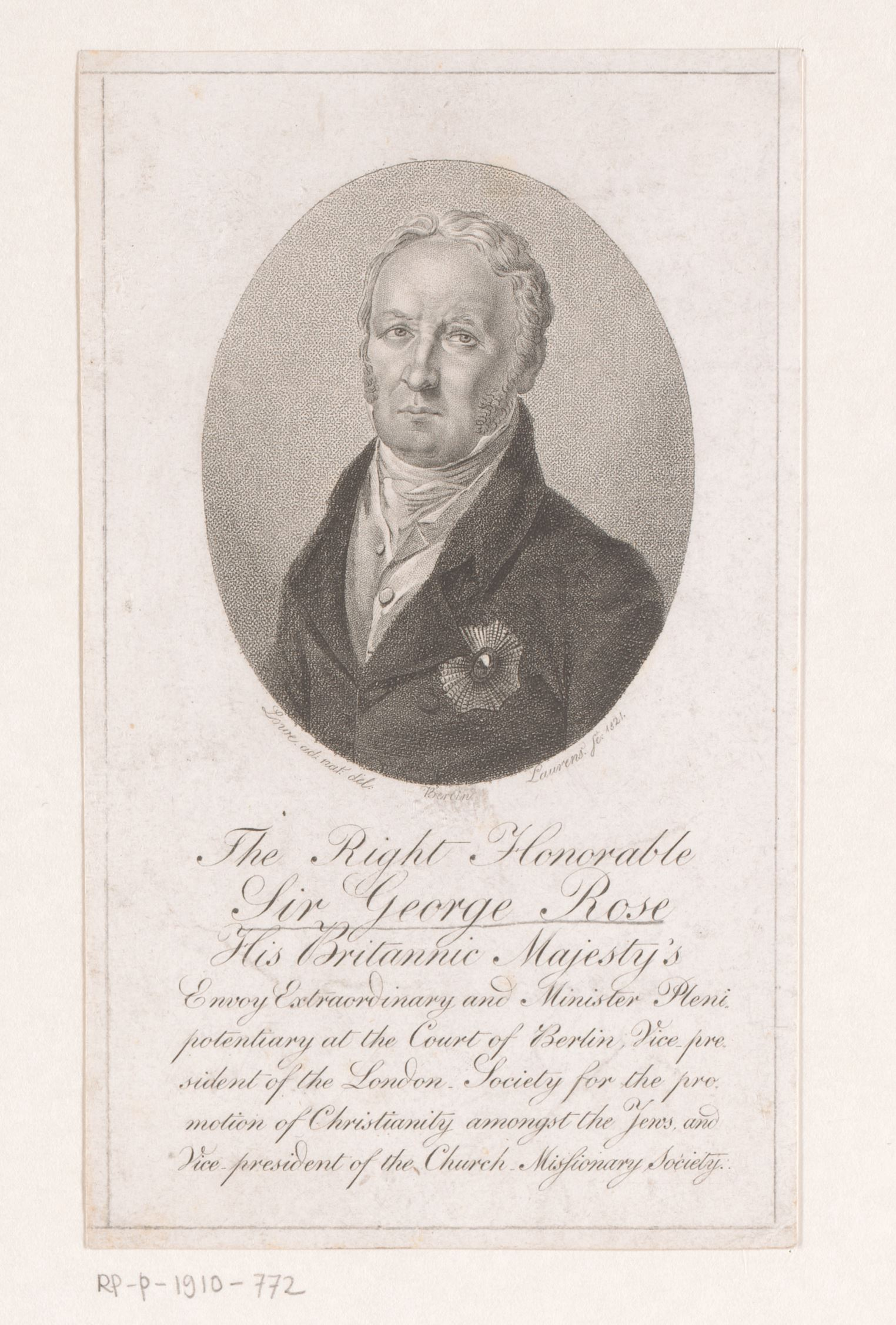
George Henry Rose

Sir George Henry Rose GCH (1771 – 17 June 1855) was a British politician and diplomat.

== Life ==
George Henry Rose was the eldest son of George Rose. He was educated at St John's College, Cambridge. He was Member of Parliament (MP) for Southampton from 1794 to 1813 and for Christchurch from 1818 to 1832 and 1837–44, Clerk of the Parliaments from 1818 to 1855 and sometime Envoy Extraordinary to Munich and Berlin, and to the United States in 1807–1808 in the wake of the Chesapeake-Leopard Affair. This last mission was an utter failure owing to the harsh and inflexible instructions he received from George Canning.

== Family ==
In 1796 he married Frances Duncombe, daughter of Thomas Duncombe of Duncombe Park, Yorkshire. She was one of the wealthiest young women in the country. They had four children together:

- Major George Pitt Rose (1797–1851), married Phoebe Susanna Vesey, daughter of Major-Gen. John Agmondisham Vesey.
- Frances Theodora Rose (1798–1879), married George Douglas, 17th Earl of Morton.
- Charles Philip Rose (1799–1835), died unmarried.
- Field Marshal Hugh Rose, 1st Baron Strathnairn (1801–1885), died unmarried.
- Sir William Rose (1808–1885), married Hon. Sophia Maria Andalusia Thellusson, daughter of John Thellusson, 2nd Baron Rendlesham.
- Arthur Robert Rose (1811–1869)

Parliament of Great Britain
Preceded by James Amyatt; Sir Henry Martin, Bt	Member of Parliament for Southampton; 1794–1801; With: James Amyatt	Succeeded by Parliament of the United Kingdom
Parliament of the United Kingdom
Preceded by Parliament of Great Britain	Member of Parliament for Southampton; 1801–1818; With: James Amyatt 1801–1806; Arthur Atherley 1806–1807, 1812–1818; Josias Jackson 1807–1812	Succeeded by William Chamberlayne; William Champion de Crespigny
Preceded by George Rose; William Edward Tomline	Member of Parliament for Christchurch; 1818 – 1832; With: William Sturges-Bourne 1818–1826; George Pitt Rose 1826 – 1832	Succeeded by Sir George Tapps-Gervis, Bt
Preceded by Sir George Tapps-Gervis, Bt	Member of Parliament for Christchurch; 1837–1844	Succeeded by Hon. Edward Harris
Diplomatic posts
Preceded by New legation	British Minister to Bavaria; 1814–1815	Succeeded by Hon. Frederick Lamb
Preceded by Hon. Sir Charles Stewart	British Minister to Prussia; 1815–1818	Succeeded by ?
Political offices
Preceded by George Rose	Clerk of the Parliaments; 1818–1855	Succeeded by John George Shaw-Lefevre
