= Mad Jack Fuller =

British member of Parliament (1757–1834)

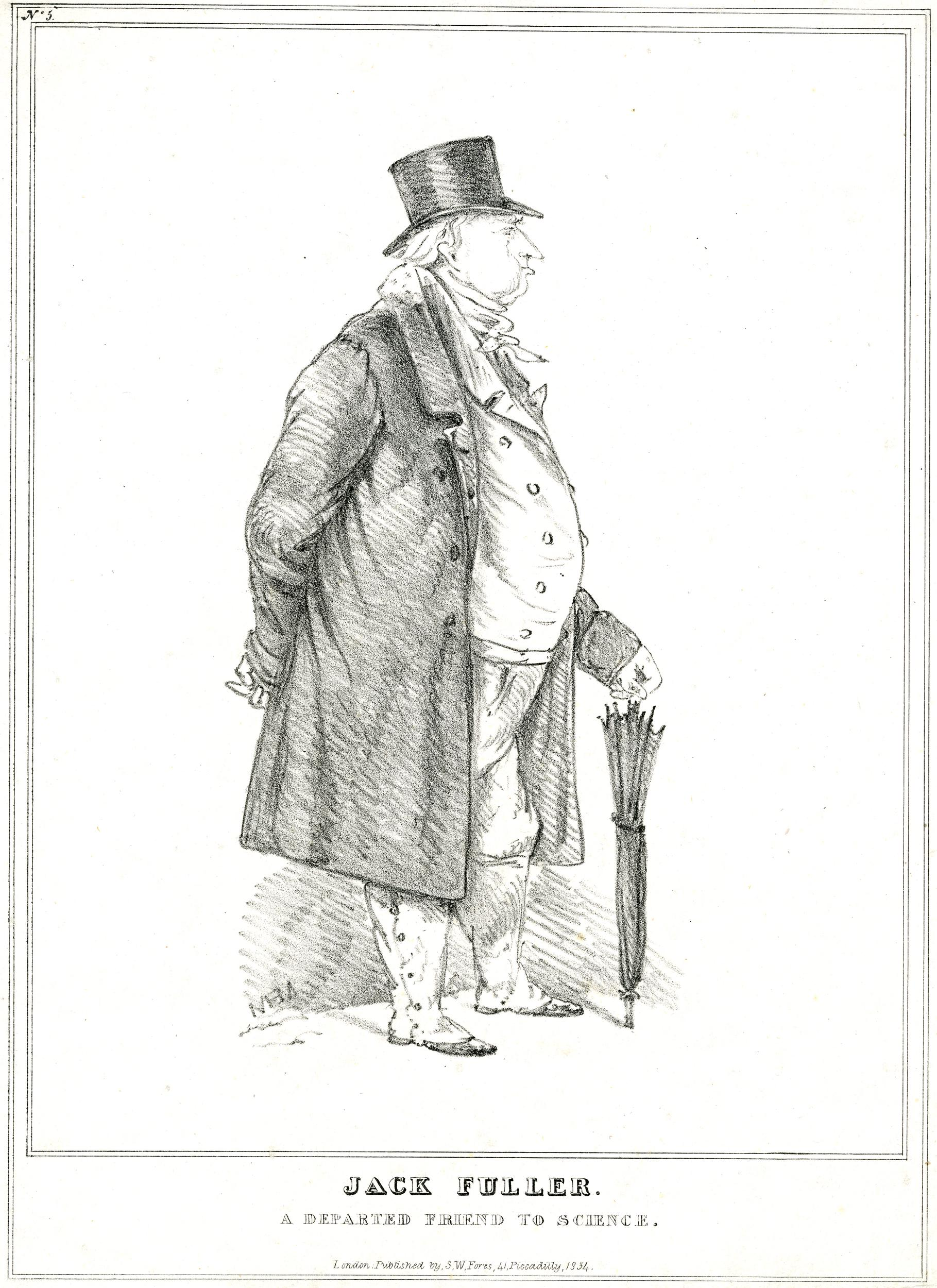

John Fuller (20 February 1757 – 11 April 1834), better known as "Mad Jack" Fuller (although he himself preferred to be called "Honest John" Fuller), was squire of the hamlet of Brightling, in Sussex, and a politician who was a member of the House of Commons between 1780 and 1812. He was a builder of follies, philanthropist, patron of the arts and sciences, and slave owner and a supporter of slavery. He purchased and commissioned many paintings from J. M. W. Turner. He was sponsor and mentor to Michael Faraday.

== Early life ==
Fuller was born on 20 February 1757, in North Stoneham, Hampshire. He was christened in the village of Waldron, near Heathfield in Sussex, in the south of England. His parents were the Reverend Henry Fuller (15 January 1713 – 23 July 1761) and his wife (also his cousin) Frances, née Fuller (1725 – 14 February 1778).

He lost his father in 1761, when he was four. At the age of ten, in 1767, he began his education at Eton College, the prestigious public school in Berkshire.

On 7 May 1777, Fuller's uncle Rose Fuller, MP died, leaving Jack his Sussex estates and Jamaican plantations. Thus, at the age of 20, Jack Fuller thus took possession of the Rose Hill estate (now Brightling Park) at Brightling, Sussex.

== Political career ==
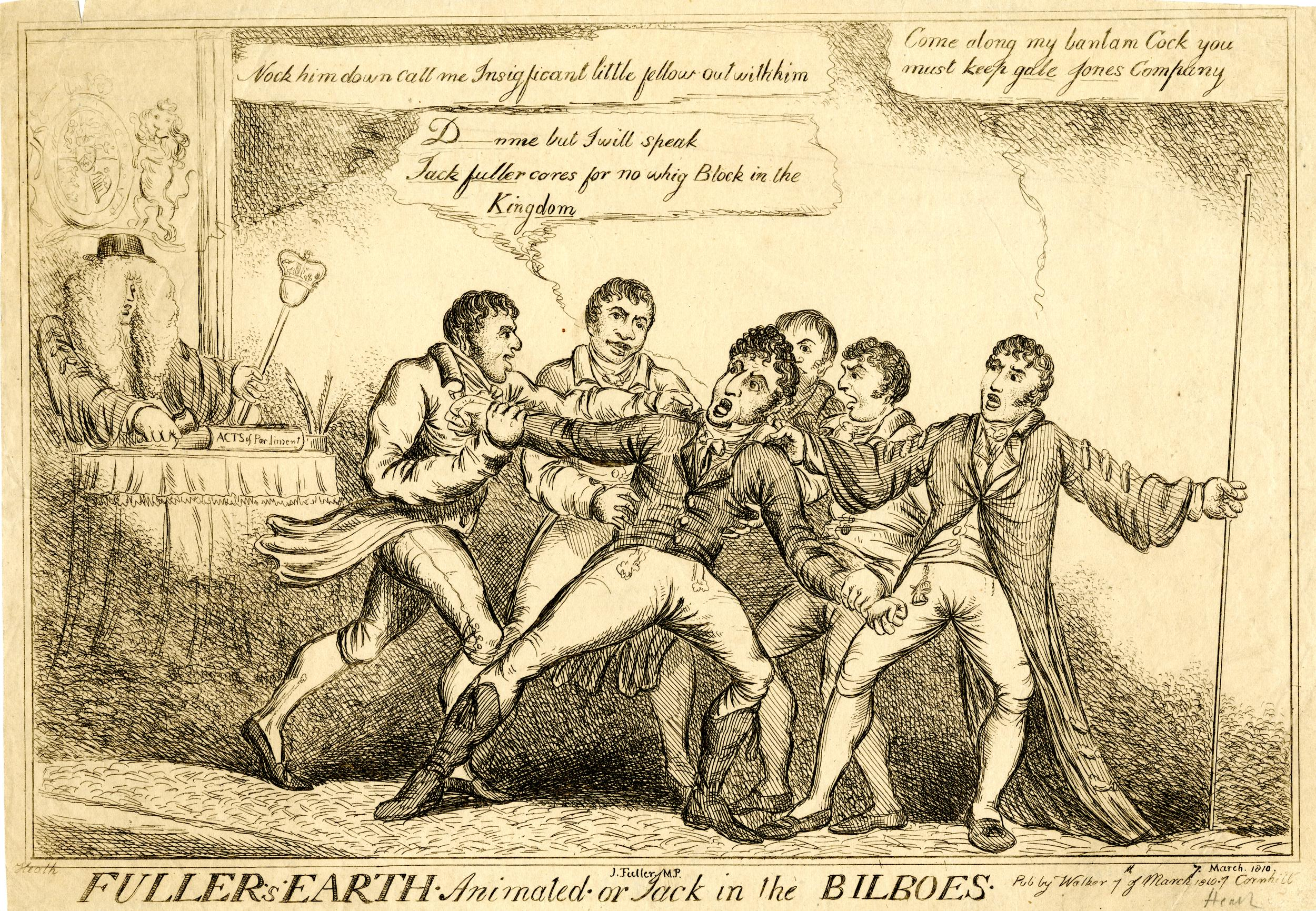
Satirical print of Fuller by William Heath

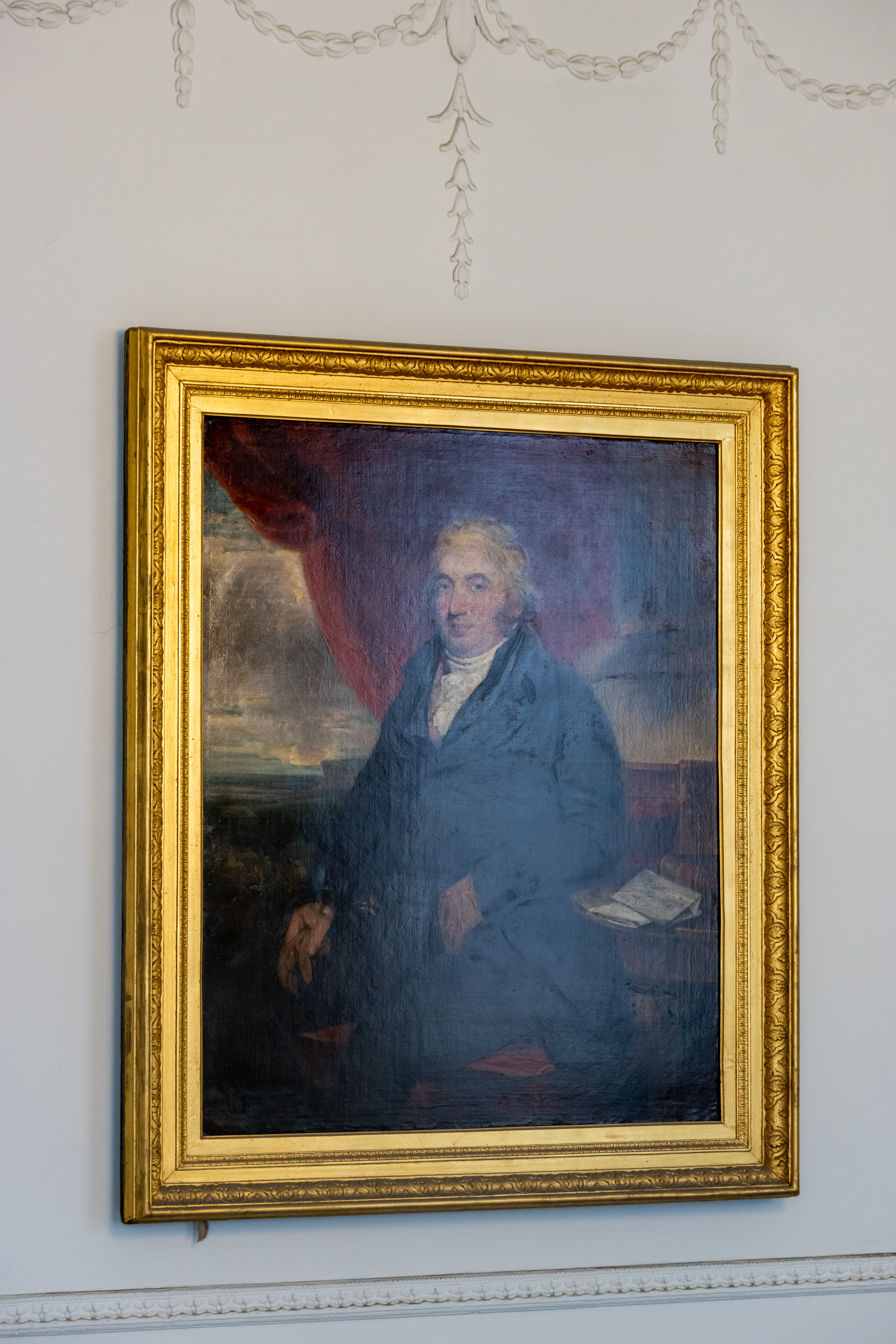
Portrait at the Royal Institution

In 1779, at the age of 22, Fuller was captain of a light infantry company in the Sussex Militia. In 1796, he was appointed High Sheriff of Sussex, for a period of one year and, in 1798, he became a captain in the Sussex Gentlemen and Yeomanry Cavalry.

In 1780, aged 23, Fuller was elected to Parliament as a Tory, representing Southampton until 1784, and Sussex from 1801 to 1812.

Fuller was a noted drunk. On 27 February 1810, he was involved in an incident with the Speaker in Parliament, which led to him being seized by the Serjeant-at-Arms and subjected to public disgrace. At that time, he was serving on a committee that was enquiring into the reasons behind the disastrous Walcheren Expedition the previous year.

Fuller owned two Jamaican plantations which he had inherited from his uncle, Rose Fuller, along with the slaves who worked them. In one debate he claimed that West Indian slaves lived in better conditions than many people in England.

On 17 July 1781, Fuller's sister Elizabeth married Sir John Palmer Acland, a grandson of Sir Hugh Acland MP, in St. Marylebone in London.

In 1790, aged 33, Fuller proposed marriage to Susannah Arabella Thrale, the daughter of Henry Thrale and Hester Thrale, but was rebuffed. He never married and is not known to have had any children.

In 1811, Fuller erected a pyramid-shaped building, often referred to as "The Pyramid", in the churchyard of the Church of St. Thomas à Becket in Brightling, as a future mausoleum for himself.

Fuller retired from politics in 1812, not standing for re-election in the general election of that year.

== Later life ==
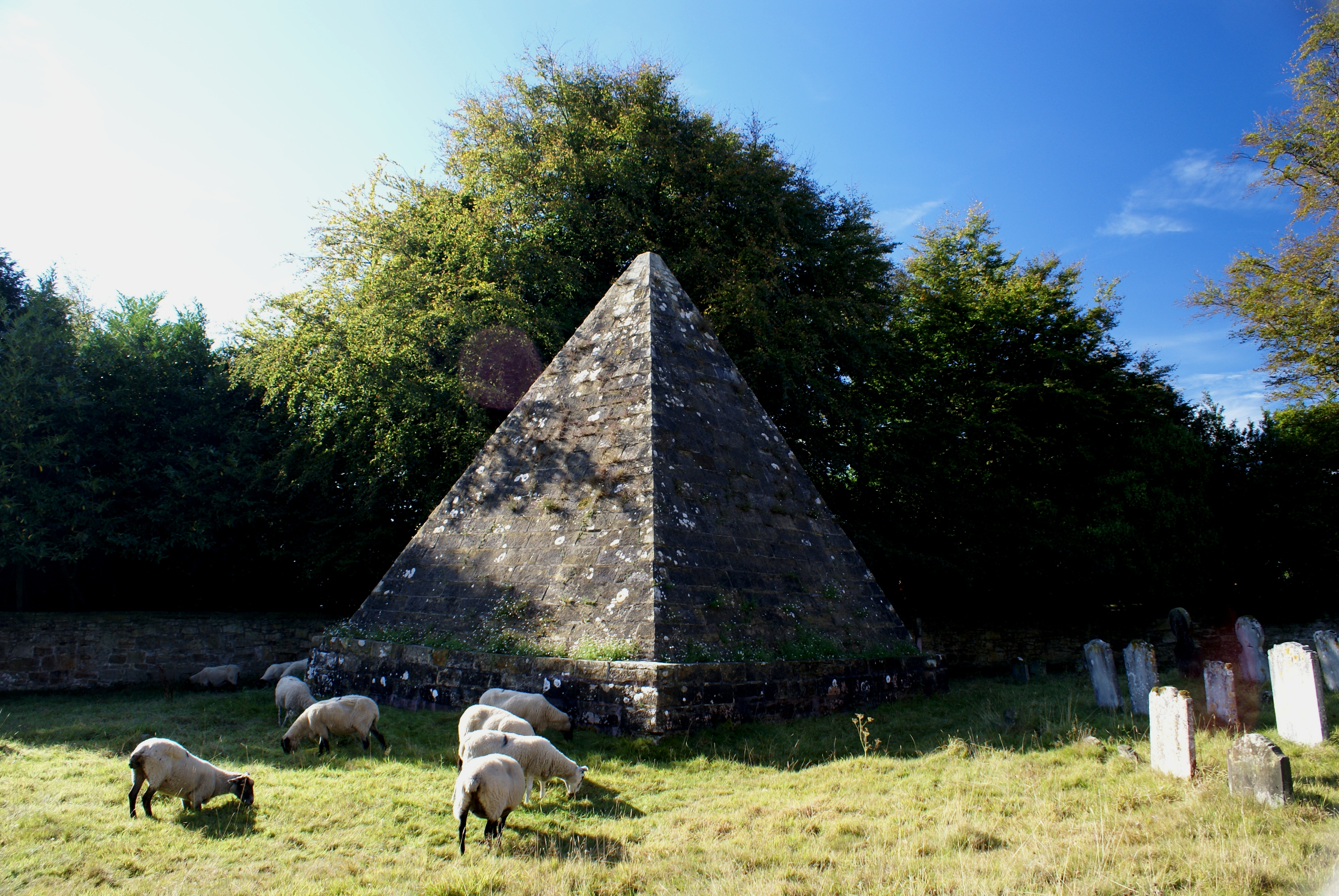
Fuller's tomb in Brightling Churchyard, 2009

Fuller was a supporter and sponsor of the Royal Institution in London, and acted as mentor and supporter of the young Michael Faraday. In 1818, he loaned the Institution £1000 (about £100,000 in today's value) and later wrote off the debt.

In 1828, he established the Fuller Medal of the Royal Institution and, in early 1833, he founded the Fullerian Professorship of Chemistry, to which Michael Faraday was appointed as the first professor. Later, Fuller also endowed the institution with the Fullerian Professorship of Physiology. In contemporary times, use of the Fullerian title has been discontinued, and the two chairs are no longer filled.

In 1818, Fuller built the Observatory at Brightling, designed by Robert Smirke and, in 1822, he endowed Eastbourne in Sussex with its first lifeboat. Unsubstantiated sources claim that, in 1828, he financed the building of the Belle Tout Lighthouse, on the cliff at Beachy Head, near Eastbourne. The first Belle Tout lighthouse was a temporary wooden structure that came into service on 1 October 1828. The construction of the permanent granite lighthouse began in 1829 and it became operational on 11 October 1834. On Thursday, 18 September 1828, Fuller bought Bodiam Castle for 3000 guineas at auction, to save it from destruction.

On the afternoon of Friday 11 April 1834, Fuller died at his home, 36 Devonshire Place, London, and was buried under "The Pyramid" in Brightling churchyard. For many years, the local legend was that he was buried in his pyramid seated at a table with a cooked chicken and a bottle of his favourite claret. The story is still told locally, although later excavation showed that it is not true. The main beneficiaries of his will were his nephew, Peregrine Palmer Fuller Palmer Acland (1789–1871), and General Sir Augustus Elliot Fuller (1777–1857), who was John Fuller's first cousin once removed.

Fuller is still fondly remembered in Sussex as a kindly man who, during times of great hardship, gave employment to many local men to build a wall around his estate in Brightling.

Parliament of Great Britain
Preceded by Hans Stanley; John Fleming	Member of Parliament for Southampton; Jan 1780 – 1784; With: John Fleming; Hans Sloane	Succeeded by John Fleming; James Amyatt
Parliament of the United Kingdom
Preceded by Thomas Pelham; Charles Lennox	Member of Parliament for Sussex; Jul 1801 – 1812; With: Charles Lennox 1790–1807; Charles William Wyndham 1807–12	Succeeded by Walter Burrell; Sir Godfrey Webster, Bt
