= James Amyatt =

English politician (1734–1813)

James Amyatt (1734–1813), of Freemantle, Hampshire was an English politician who sat in the House of Commons between 1774 and 1806.

Amyatt was the second son. of Benjamin Amyatt of Totnes and was baptized on 18 July 1734. He is said to have become a captain in the service of the East India Company. He became a free merchant in India. He married Maria Amyatt widow of Peter Amyatt of the council of Calcutta, and daughter of Rev. W. Wollaston of Norfolk.

At the 1774 general election he was elected Member of Parliament for Totnes in a contest. In 1784 he was elected MP for Southampton and held the seat until 1806.

Parliament of Great Britain
Preceded by Peter Burrell; Sir Philip Jennings-Clerke, Bt	Member of Parliament for Totnes; 1774 – 1780; With: Sir Philip Jennings-Clerke, Bt	Succeeded by Launcelot Brown; Sir Philip Jennings-Clerke, Bt
Preceded by Hans Sloane; John 'Mad Jack' Fuller	Member of Parliament for Southampton; 1784 – 1800; With: John Fleming to 1790; Henry Martin 1790–5; George Henry Rose from 1795	Succeeded by Parliament of the United Kingdom
Parliament of the United Kingdom
Preceded by Parliament of Great Britain	Member of Parliament for Southampton; 1801 – 1806; With: George Henry Rose	Succeeded by Arthur Atherley; George Henry Rose
