= Sir Henry Martin, 2nd Baronet =

Sir Henry William Martin, 2nd Baronet (20 December 1768 – 3 February 1842) was an English amateur cricketer.

Martin was born on 20 December 1768 at Bishopstown, County Cork, Ireland. He was the eldest surviving son of the naval officer, Henry Martin, naval officer, and was the elder brother of naval officer Thomas Byam Martin.

== Cricket career ==
Martin was an English amateur cricketer who made 7 known appearances in important matches from 1797 to 1813 as well as numerous appearances in other significant matches. His name is given as "Marten" in most if not all cricket sources. Martin was mainly associated with Surrey and was a member of Marylebone Cricket Club (MCC). Sir Henry died on 3 February 1842 at his house in Upper Harley Street, London.

== British West Indies ==
Of a family long resident in Antigua and Montserrat his 271-page Travel journal of Sir H. W. Martin is in the manuscripts collection of the British Library and many pages are displayed online by the British Library, external link below.

Martin owned three sugar plantations in Antigua, and when the British government emancipated the slaves in the 1830s, he was associated with many others including slave owners, mortgagees and bankers in mostly unsuccessful claims for compensation for the liberation of over 300 slaves to the tune of about £10,000.

== External sources ==
- CricketArchive profile

Baronetage of Great Britain
Preceded by Henry Martin	Baronet (Martin of Lockynge); 1794 – 1842	Succeeded by Henry Martin
