= Sir Henry Martin, 1st Baronet =

Sir Henry Martin Bt
- Born: Henry William Martin; 29 August 1733
- Died: 1 August 1794 (aged 60)
- Military career
- Allegiance: Great Britain
- Branch: Royal Navy
- Service years: 1749–1794
- Rank: Captain
- Commands: HMS Lightning; HMS Northumberland; HMS Arc en Ciel; HMS Danae; HMS Phoenix; HMS Intrepid; Resident Commissioner, Portsmouth Dockyard; Governor, Royal Naval Academy; Comptroller of the Navy
- Conflicts: Seven Years' War; Louisbourg Expedition; American Revolutionary War; French Revolutionary Wars

Captain Sir Henry William Martin, 1st Baronet (29 August 1733 – 1 August 1794) was a Royal Navy officer whose final appointment was Comptroller of the Navy from 1790 to 1794.

Martin was born at Shroton House, Dorset, 29 August 1733. On the death of his brother George in 1748 he became the eldest surviving son of the second marriage of Samuel Martin, plantation owner of Antigua to Sarah née Wyke, 20, widow of William Irish, plantation owner of Montserrat in the West Indies.

== Career ==
Martin was educated at the Portsmouth naval academy and privately by Dr Pemberton. He was appointed a captain in the Royal Navy and served in American and West Indian waters in the Seven Years' War. He married in 1761 and after the conclusion of the peace treaties in early 1763 they lived at Bishopstown near Cork where he had a leasehold farm. Considered by his father to be 'self-diffident' and in 'want of that assurance so necessary to push his way to preferment' he was given the goad of being let survive with some difficulty on limited resources from prize money and his father's marriage settlement. He returned to the Navy briefly in 1770 during a war scare and thereafter lived at Bath where his father joined them.

In 1780 he was appointed resident naval commissioner at Portsmouth, a role he held for ten years.

Harry Martin succeeded his half-brother, Samuel as a plantation owner in Antigua in 1788. In March 1790 he was appointed Comptroller of the Navy and later that year was elected Member of Parliament for Southampton. He was created a baronet 28 July 1791, Martin of Lockynge, Berkshire.

== Personal life ==
Henry Martin married, 26 November 1761, Eliza Anne Gillman, daughter of Harding Parker of Passage West county Cork and widow of St Leger Hayward Gillman of Gillmansville county Cork. They had four sons and four daughters. Their youngest son, Admiral Sir Thomas Byam Martin, was also Comptroller of the Navy 1816–1831.

=== Sarah Catherine Martin ===
His daughter, Sarah Catherine (c1768-1826), assembled the nursery rhyme Old Mother Hubbard. She suffered the attentions of a very young Prince William Henry and never married but while a visitor at the Devonshire house of her sister, Mrs Pollexfen Bastard, she assembled the rhyme about her sister's housekeeper for the entertainment of fellow guests though she may not be responsible for the first few lines. It was so successful she published it in 1805 as The Comic Adventures of Old Mother Hubbard and her Dog.

== Death ==
He died at his Town House, 51 Upper Harley Street, London, on Friday, 1 August 1794, at age 60.

"In the death of Sir Henry Martin, Baronet, late Comptroller of the Navy, the world has been deprived of one of its noblest ornaments; for as such, must ever be esteemed a character replete with every virtue that can dignify human nature. His loss in public and private will be severely felt. The uprightness of his actions in his public capacity is too well known to need the testimony of an individual; and in private life, those who were so happy as to know him best, daily saw in him the kind indulgent husband, the tender affectionate father, the firm and faithful friend. The benevolence of his mind shone conspicuous in every action of his life. He lived adored by his family, beloved, esteemed, admired by his numerous acquaintance. He died sincerely lamented by all; and to fum up his character in one short line, "The feat of every virtue was his heart!""

Military offices
Preceded by Lord Barham	Comptroller of the Navy; 1790–1794	Succeeded by Sir Andrew Hamond
Parliament of Great Britain
Preceded by John Fleming; James Amyatt	Member of Parliament for Southampton; 1790 – 1794; With: James Amyatt	Succeeded by George Rose; James Amyatt
Baronetage of Great Britain
New creation	Baronet (of Lockynge); 1791 – 1794	Succeeded by Henry William Martin
