= Henry Graham (parliamentary clerk) =

Scottish public servant

Sir Henry Graham KCB

Clerk of the Parliaments
- In office 1885–1917
- Preceded by: Sir William Rose
- Succeeded by: Sir Arthur Thring

Sir Henry John Lowndes Graham, KCB (15 January 1842 – 5 December 1930) was a Scottish public servant, Clerk of the Parliaments from 1885 to 1917.

== Biography ==
Graham was born on 15 January 1842, the only son of William Graham of Burntsheilds, Renfrewshire, and his wife Anna, née Lowndes; his sisters included Lady Barrington (wife of Sir Eric Barrington) and his half-brother was the Glasgow MP William Graham, whose own children included Dame Agnes Jekyll, Frances Horner (wife of Sir John Horner), and the wives of Quintin Hogg and Lord Muir Mackenzie. He attended Harrow School (1855–60), where he was a monitor in his final year, and then went up to Balliol College, Oxford, to read classics (1860–64); he also rowed for the college.

Called to the bar in 1868, in 1874 Lord Cairns (the Lord Chancellor) appointed Graham his private secretary; when Cairns left his office, he appointed Graham a Master in Lunacy, but in 1885 he was appointed Clerk of the Parliaments. In that capacity, he attended two coronations and witnessed the rejection of the People's Budget by the House of Lords and the subsequent passage of the Parliament Act 1911. He retired in 1917.

Graham was appointed a Companion of the Order of the Bath (CB) in 1895. He was promoted to Knight Commander (KCB) of the Order in the 1902 Coronation Honours list published on 26 June 1902, and invested as such by King Edward VII at Buckingham Palace on 24 October 1902.

He died, aged 88, on 5 December 1930, leaving a widow and five children.

Graham married first Lady Edith Elizabeth Gathorne-Hardy (died 1875), daughter of Gathorne Gathorne-Hardy, 1st Earl of Cranbrook, by whom he left two sons, the diplomat Sir Ronald Graham and the writer Harry Graham. He married secondly Lady Margaret Georgiana Compton, daughter of William Compton, 4th Marquess of Northampton), by whom he had three children.

Government offices
| Preceded by Sir William Rose | Clerk of the Parliaments; 1885–1917 | Succeeded by Sir Arthur Thring |
