= George Rose (politician) =

British politician (1744–1818)

The Right Honourable George Rose
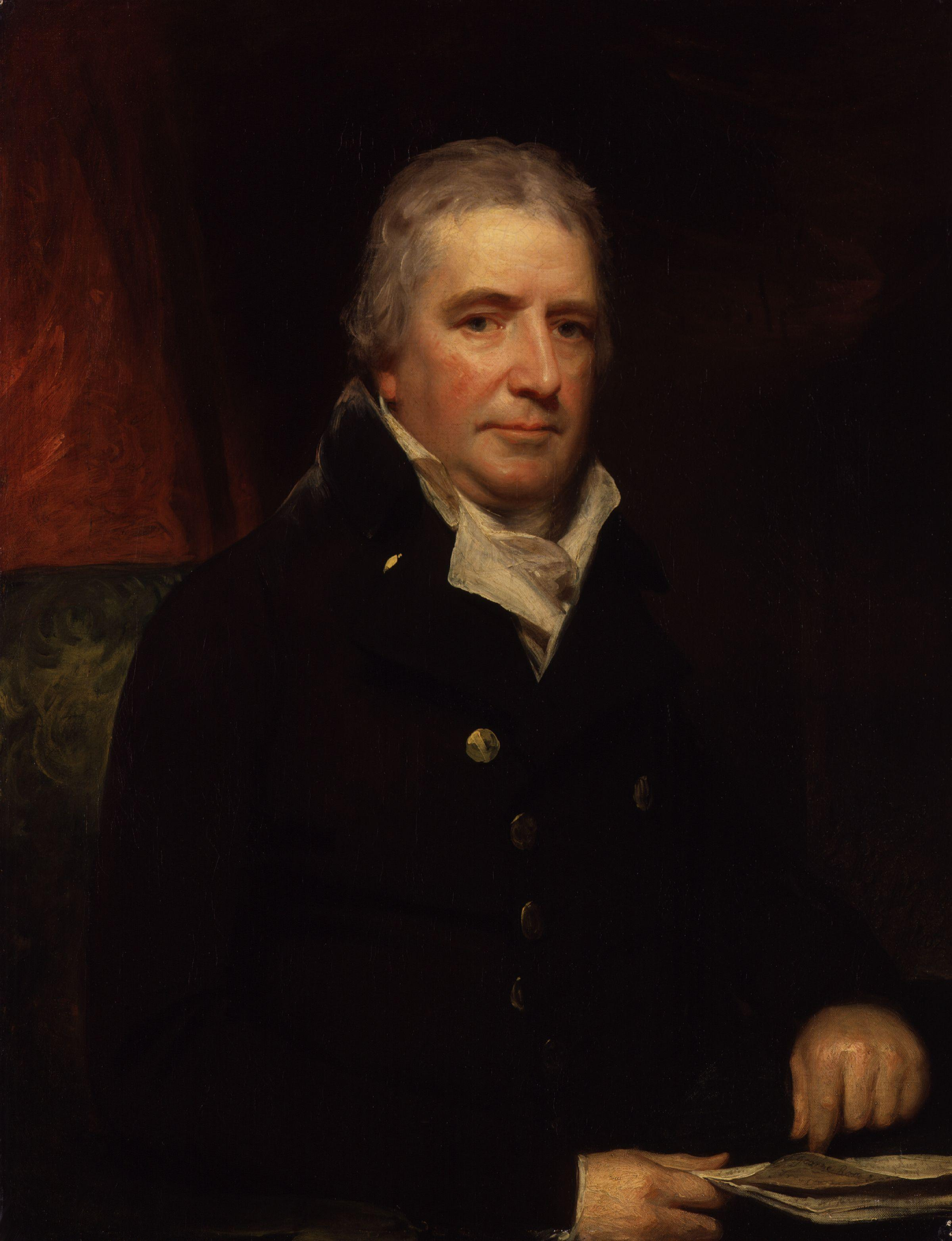
- Portrait of George Rose by William Beechey, 1802

Vice-President of the Board of Trade
- In office 1807–1812
- Preceded by: Earl Temple
- Succeeded by: Frederick John Robinson

Secretary to the Treasury
- In office 1783–1801 Serving with Thomas Steele (until 1791) and Charles Long (since 1791)
- Preceded by: Richard Burke; Richard Brinsley Sheridan
- Succeeded by: Charles Long; John Hiley Addington

Member of Parliament for Christchurch
- In office 1790 – 13 January 1818
- Preceded by: John Frederick
- Succeeded by: Sir George Henry Rose

Personal details
- Born: 17 June 1744 Brechin, Angus, Scotland
- Died: 13 January 1818 (aged 73) Lyndhurst, Hampshire, England
- Resting place: Christchurch Priory
- Spouse: Theodora Duer (m. 1769–1818)
- Children: 3, including George and William
- Parent: The Reverend David Rose (father)

George Rose (17 June 1744 – 13 January 1818) was a British politician.

== Life ==
Born at Woodside near Brechin, Scotland, Rose was the second son of the Reverend David Rose of Lethnot, of an ancient family of Kilravock, in the County of Nairn, titled Baron of Kilravock by his second wife, Margaret, daughter of Donald Rose of Wester Clune (and a descendant of James Sharp, Archbishop of St Andrews from 1661 to 1679, through his daughter, Isabella). David Rose was said to be the illegitimate son of Hugh Hume-Campbell, 3rd Earl of Marchmont; no illegitimate son is mentioned by Thomas Finlayson Henderson in Marchmont's entry in the Dictionary of National Biography, and George Rose's own entry in that same edition states: 'Later gossip, which made him out a natural son of Lord Marchmont [see Hume, Hugh, third Earl of Marchmont], an apothecary's apprentice, or a purser's clerk, may safely be disregarded'. This indicates the lack of exact detail attached to the claim (as it was in fact George Rose's father David that was said to have been Marchmont's illegitimate son). Nevertheless there was a strong connection with the Marchmonts: Rev. David Rose became tutor to Marchmont's eldest son, Lord Polwarth, and George Rose, on leaving the Royal Navy, was recommended by Marchmont for the position of deputy-chamberlain of the Tally court of the Exchequer, and on Marchmont's death, serving as his sole executor, was bequeathed his library, 'consisting of one of the most curious and valuable collections of manuscripts in Great Britain'. George Rose's son, politician Sir George Henry Rose, published in 1831 'A Selection from the papers of the Earls of Marchmont'. An account of the relationship between the Marchmonts and the Rose family is given in 'The Diaries and Correspondence of the Right Hon. George Rose' (1860), edited by Rev. Leveson Vernon Harcourt.

Owing to his father's poverty, at the age of four years Rose was sent to live with a maternal uncle who ran a school at Hampstead; he was educated for a short time at Westminster School before entering the Royal Navy, a service which he left in 1762 after he had been wounded in some fighting in the West Indies. He then obtained a position in the civil service, becoming joint Keeper of the Records in 1772 and secretary to the Board of Taxes in 1777. In 1782, he gave up the latter appointment to become one of the secretaries to the treasury under Prime Minister Lord Shelburne, though he did not enter Parliament.

He left office with his colleagues in April 1783, but in the following December he returned to his former position at the Treasury in Pitt's ministry, being henceforward one of this minister's most steadfast supporters. He entered Parliament as the Member for Launceston early in 1784, and his fidelity and friendship were rewarded by Pitt, who gave him a lucrative post in the Court of Exchequer; in 1788 he became Clerk of the Parliaments. He was also re-elected to Parliament in 1788 to represent Lymington and again in 1790 to represent Christchurch. In 1801, Rose left office with Pitt, but returned with him to power in 1804, when he was made vice-president of the committee on trade and joint Paymaster General. He was made a Privy Councillor in January 1802.

Rose resigned these offices a few days after Pitt's death in 1806, but he served as vice-president of the committee on trade and Treasurer of the Navy under the Duke of Portland and Spencer Perceval from 1807 to 1812. In 1807, he was asked to create a new institution, in conjunction with Edward Jenner, to carry out mass vaccinations against smallpox. The National Vaccine Establishment, which is controlled by the Vaccine Board, composed of members of the College of Physicians and the College of Surgeons under the Presidency of Sir Lucas Pepys, was established in 1808.

He was still Treasurer of the Navy under Lord Liverpool and MP for Christchurch, a seat he had held for 28 years, when he died in 1818 at Cuffnells, his house in Lyndhurst, Hampshire. He and many of his family are buried at Christchurch Priory,

Rose was a close friend of Admiral Lord Nelson. He first met Nelson when the latter was a young Captain and had just returned from the West Indies. This friendship grew over the years. Nelson invited Rose to go on board HMS Victory before the ship sailed for the Battle of Trafalgar; his purpose was to tell Rose that, if he was killed, he had left Lady Hamilton and their daughter Horatia to the Nation. Rose was thus the last man in England to see Nelson alive. After Nelson's death Rose became Emma Hamilton's executor and Horatia's guardian; but Pitt's death diminished Rose's influence and his fellow Ministers did not support her.

Rose was also a friend of King George III and his family who stayed with him a number of times at Cuffnells on their way to summer holidays at Weymouth. Rose also owned a seaside house at Sandhills near Christchurch, now a holiday camp.

Rose was a conscientious politician, although he and his two sons drew a large amount of money from sinecures, a fact referred to by William Cobbett in his A New Year's Gift to old George Rose.

== Works ==
Rose wrote several books on economic subjects, and his Diaries and Correspondence, edited by the Rev. L. V. Harcourt, was published in 1860.

== Family ==
In 1769, Rose had married Theodora, the daughter of John Duer of Fulham, Middlesex and Antigua, and with her had two sons and a daughter. Theodora was the sister of Founding Father William Duer.

The elder son, Sir George Henry Rose (1771–1855), was in Parliament from 1794 to 1813, and again from 1818 to 1844, and in the meantime was British minister at Munich, at Berlin, and at Washington. He was made a Knight Grand Cross of the Royal Guelphic Order and in 1818 succeeded his father as Clerk of the Parliaments. He was the father of Field Marshal Baron Strathnairn who was described as one of the bravest men in the British Army and the best commander in the Indian Mutiny.

The second son was the poet William Stewart Rose who was friendly with Sir Walter Scott.

== Legacy ==
The historic Australian town (now suburb of Sydney) of Parramatta was originally called Rose Hill after George Rose, but was later renamed. However, the name Rose Hill was retained by a neighbouring suburb, Rose Hill.

Parliament of Great Britain
Preceded by Charles Perceval; Sir John Jervis	Member of Parliament for Launceston; 1784–1788; With: Charles Perceval	Succeeded by Charles Perceval; Sir John Swinburne, Bt
Preceded by Harry Burrard; Robert Colt	Member of Parliament for Lymington; 1788–1790; With: Robert Colt	Succeeded by Harry Burrard; Harry Burrard-Neale
Preceded by John Frederick; Hans Sloane	Member of Parliament for Christchurch; 1790–1801; With: Hans Sloane 1790–1796; William Stewart Rose 1796–1800; William Chamberlayne 1800–1801	Succeeded by Parliament of the United Kingdom
Parliament of the United Kingdom
Preceded by Parliament of Great Britain	Member of Parliament for Christchurch; 1801–1818; With: William Chamberlayne 1801–1802; William Sturges Bourne 1802–1812; William Edward Tomline 1812–1818	Succeeded by William Edward Tomline; Sir George Henry Rose
Political offices
Preceded by Richard Burke	Secretary to the Treasury (junior); 1782–1783	Succeeded by Richard Burke
Preceded by Richard Brinsley Sheridan	Secretary to the Treasury (senior); 1783–1801	Succeeded by John Hiley Addington
Preceded by Ashley Cowper	Clerk of the Parliaments; 1788–1818	Succeeded by Sir George Henry Rose
Preceded by Nathaniel Bond	Vice-President of the Board of Trade; 1804–1806	Succeeded by Earl Temple
Preceded by Thomas Steele; John Hiley Addington	Paymaster of the Forces; 1804–1806; With: Lord Charles Henry Somerset	Succeeded by Earl Temple; Lord John Townshend
Preceded by Earl Temple	Vice-President of the Board of Trade; 1807–1812	Succeeded by Frederick John Robinson
Preceded by Richard Brinsley Sheridan	Treasurer of the Navy; 1807–1818	Succeeded by Frederick John Robinson
