= John Fleming (Southampton MP) =

John Fleming (1743 – 28 February 1802) was a British Tory politician who sat in the House of Commons between 1774 and 1790.

He was elected at the 1774 general election as a Member of Parliament (MP) for Southampton. At the 1780 general election he was defeated by his fellow-Tory Hans Sloane, who won the seat with 249 votes to Fleming's 237. Fleming was re-elected unopposed in 1784, and held the seat until the 1790 general election which he did not contest.

Parliament of Great Britain
Preceded by Viscount Palmerston; Hans Stanley	Member of Parliament for Southampton; 1774–1780; With: Hans Stanley to Jan 1780; John 'Mad Jack' Fuller from Jan 1780	Succeeded by Hans Sloane; John 'Mad Jack' Fuller
Preceded by John 'Mad Jack' Fuller; Hans Sloane	Member of Parliament for Southampton; 1784–1790; With: James Amyatt	Succeeded by Henry Martin; James Amyatt
