= William Edward Tomline =

English Member of Parliament

William Edward Pretyman Tomline FRS (27 February 1787 – 28 May 1836) was an English Member of Parliament for several constituencies.

He was the son of George Pretyman Tomline, Bishop of Lincoln. He married Frances Amler, daughter and heiress of John of Ford Hall near Shrewsbury in 1811. The marriage produced two daughters and three sons, one of whom was Colonel George Tomline, also a Member of Parliament. On the death of his father, he inherited Riby Grove and property in Bacton, Suffolk.

He was born at Riby Grove in Lincolnshire, and educated at Westminster School and Trinity College, Cambridge. On 19 November 1812 Tomline was elected a Fellow of the Royal Society. He was MP for Christchurch from 1812 to 1818, Truro from 1818 to 1820 and 1826 to 1829, and Minehead from 1830 to 1831. He was appointed High Sheriff of Lincolnshire for 1824–25.

His London home was the John Nash-designed, 1 Carlton House Terrace. He died aged 49 in 1836.

Parliament of the United Kingdom
Preceded by William Sturges Bourne; George Rose	Member of Parliament for Christchurch; 1812 – June 1818; With: George Rose to March 1818; Sir George Henry Rose from March 1818	Succeeded by William Sturges Bourne; Sir George Henry Rose
Preceded by George Dashwood; Sir George Warrender, Bt	Member of Parliament for Truro; 1818–1820; With: Lord FitzRoy Somerset	Succeeded by William Gossett; Sir Hussey Vivian
Preceded by William Gossett; Sir Hussey Vivian	Member of Parliament for Truro; 1826–1829; With: Lord FitzRoy Somerset	Succeeded by Viscount Encombe; Nathaniel William Peach
Preceded by James Blair; John Fownes Luttrell, junior	Member of Parliament for Minehead; 1830–1831; With: John Fownes Luttrell, junior	Succeeded by Viscount Villiers; John Fownes Luttrell, junior
