= Riby =

Village and civil parish in the West Lindsey district of Lincolnshire, England

Coordinates: 53.550929°N 0.21338°W

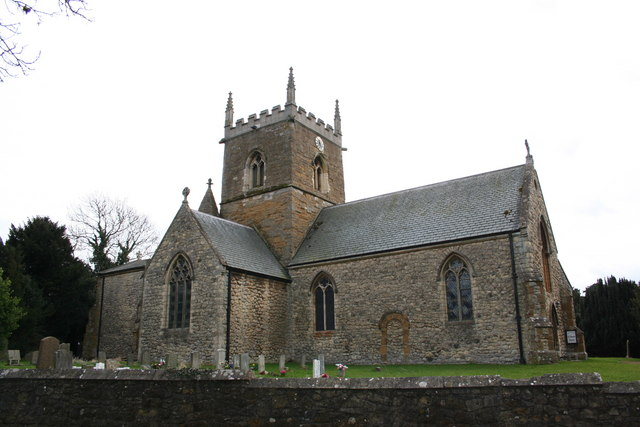
- St Edmund's Church, Riby

- Location within Lincolnshire
- Population: 129 (2011)
- OS grid reference: TA184075
  - London: 140 mi (230 km) S
- District: West Lindsey
- Shire county: Lincolnshire
- Region: East Midlands
- Country: England
- Sovereign state: United Kingdom
- Post town: Grimsby
- Postcode district: DN37
- Police: Lincolnshire
- Fire: Lincolnshire
- Ambulance: East Midlands
- UK Parliament: Gainsborough

Riby is a village and civil parish in the West Lindsey district of Lincolnshire, England. The population of the civil parish was 129 at the 2011 census. It is situated approximately 4 miles (6 km) south-west from the town of Grimsby.

== History ==
There are two scheduled barrows 700 yards (640 m) south-west of Riby Grove Farm. Whilst they are no longer visible above ground, the burial remains survive inside. One is a Neolithic long barrow, and the other a Bronze Age bowl barrow.

A hoard of 15–20,000 bronze coins dating from Gallienus to Aurelian (AD 253–275) were found in an urn covered by a dish at Riby Wold Farm in 1953. The coins are held by the Ashmolean Museum pending classification. Lincoln Museum hold a further collection of 21 coins, Constantine - Gratian (AD 305–383), thought to be only part of a hoard found at Riby.

The parish church is a Grade II* listed building dedicated to Saint Edmund and dating from the 12th century with an 1868 restoration by Ferrey, and built from limestone and ironstone. The west door is late 13th-century, and there is a blocked 12th-century door in the north aisle. The east window records that George Tomline funded the restoration, and there are several memorials to the Tomline family in the church.

On 18 June 1645, there was a civil war clash at Riby Gapp, and the parish register of Riby contains the following entries:

"Nine soldiers slaine in a skirmish in the field of Riby the day before, buried June the 19th."

"Charles Skelton, a soldiour wounded in the same skirmish, buried June the 20th."

"William Willoughbie a soldier wounded in the skirmish above named, buried July the 4th"

Riby Grove was a country house, now demolished, which stood in the village. In 1803 Marmaduke Tomline, owner of the Riby Grove, bequeathed the house and estate to George Pretyman, the Bishop of Lincoln, on condition that he adopted the name Tomline. Pretyman accepted the inheritance and thereafter adopted the name Pretyman-Tomline. His son William Edward Pretyman Tomline was born at Riby in 1787 and became a Member of Parliament and High Sheriff of Lincolnshire for 1824–25. He in turn had a son "Colonel" George Tomline, also a Member of Parliament and High Sheriff of Lincolnshire in 1852. The house was demolished in 1935.

Riby School was built in 1890 as Riby National school, replacing a village school built in 1848 by the Tomline family. It was known as Riby County School by 1947 and closed in 1958.

== Notable people ==
Riby is the birthplace of the fashion model and photographer Jill Kennington.
