= William Chamberlayne (MP) =

English Member of Parliament

William Chamberlayne (1760-1829), of Coley Park at Reading in Berkshire and Weston Grove at Southampton in Hampshire, was an English Member of Parliament (MP).

He was a Member of the Parliament of England for Christchurch 31 May 1800 - 1802 and for Southampton 7 March 1818 - 10 December 1829.
