= Elphinstone =

Elphinstone may refer to:

== Places ==
=== Australia ===
==== Queensland ====
- Elphinstone, Queensland (Isaac Region)
  - Lake Elphinstone, a lake in the Isaac Region
- Elphinstone, Queensland (Toowoomba Region)
- County of Elphinstone, Queensland

==== Victoria ====
- Elphinstone, Victoria, a town

=== Canada ===
- Elphinstone, Manitoba
- Mount Elphinstone Provincial Park, British Columbia

=== Egypt ===
- Elphinstone Reef, Red Sea

=== India ===
- Prabhadevi railway station known as Elphinstone Road until July 2017, Mumbai, India

=== United Kingdom ===
- Elphinstone, East Lothian, Scotland
- Port Elphinstone, Inverurie, Scotland

== Groups and titles ==
- Clan Elphinstone
- Lord Elphinstone, a title in the Peerage of Scotland
- Elphinstone baronets

== Schools ==
- Elphinstone College, college of the University of Mumbai
- Elphinstone Hall, part of King's College, Aberdeen, Scotland
- Elphinstone High School, Mumbai, India

== Other uses ==
- Elphinstone (surname)
- Elphinstone Bioscope, an early Indian film company
- Elphinstone Place, a cancelled building project in Glasgow, Scotland
- HMS Elphinstone, ships
- Elphinstone Engineering, an Australian manufacturer of transport equipment and truck weighing systems, based in Triabunna, Tasmania
- Elphinstone Group, an Australian manufacturer of mining equipment, based in Burnie, Tasmania
