= Elphinstone baronets of Sowerby (1816) =

Escutcheoon of the Elphinstone baronets of Sowerby

The Elphinstone baronetcy, of Sowerby in the County of Cumberland, was created in the Baronetage of the United Kingdom on 25 May 1816 for Major-General Howard Elphinstone, a veteran of the Peninsular War. He was the youngest son of John Elphinstone, a captain in the Royal Navy and admiral in the Russian Navy.

== Elphinstone baronets, of Sowerby (1816) ==
- Sir Howard Elphinstone, 1st Baronet (1773–1846)
- Sir Howard Elphinstone, 2nd Baronet (1804–1893). He sat as Liberal Member of Parliament for Hastings and Lewes.
- Sir Howard Warburton Elphinstone, 3rd Baronet (1830–1917)
  - Graham Warburton Elphinstone (1866–1903); who served in Madras as part of the Indian Civil Service; he married in 1896 Susan Harley, daughter of H. C. R. Harley, of India, and had a son and a daughter, including the 4th baronet.
- Sir Howard Graham Elphinstone, 4th Baronet (1898–1975), m. Alice Mary "Mollie" Emerton Brown
- Sir Maurice Douglas Warburton Elphinstone FRSE, 5th Baronet (1909–1995)
- Sir John Howard Main Elphinstone, 6th Baronet (born 1949)

The heir presumptive to the baronetcy is a cousin of the 6th baronet, Henry Charles Elphinstone (born 1958).

== Notes ==
Baronetage of the United Kingdom
Preceded by Floyd baronets	Elphinstone baronets of Sowerby; 25 May 1816	Succeeded by Cameron baronets
