= Elphinstone (surname) =

Elphinstone is a Scottish surname. It is locational from the lands of Elphinstone in the parish of Tranent.

Notable people with the surname include:

- Abi Elphinstone, British children's author
- Alexander Elphinstone, 1st Lord Elphinstone (died 1513), Scottish nobleman
- Alexander Elphinstone, 4th Lord Elphinstone (died 1638), Scottish nobleman
- Alexander Elphinstone, 19th Lord Elphinstone (born 1980), Scottish nobleman
- Arthur Elphinstone, 6th Lord Balmerino (1688–1746), Scottish nobleman and Jacobite army officer
- Augustus Elphinstone (1874–1964), Australian businessman
- Cecil Elphinstone (1874–1964), Australian businessman and politician
- Charles Elphinstone Fleeming (1774–1840) (born Charles Elphinstone), British admiral
- David Elphinstone (1847–1916), Australian architect
- Derek Elphinstone (1913–1999), British actor
- Euphemia Elphinstone (fl. 1509–1542), mistress of King James V of Scotland
- George Elphinstone (d. 1634), Provost of Glasgow
- George Elphinstone, 1st Viscount Keith (1746–1823), British admiral
- Hester Maria Elphinstone, Viscountess Keith (1764–1857), British literary correspondent and intellectual
- Howard Elphinstone (disambiguation), several people including
  - Sir Howard Craufurd Elphinstone VC (1829–1890), British Army general
- James Elphinstone (disambiguation), several people
- John Elphinstone (1722–1785), British naval officer
- John Elphinstone, 17th Lord Elphinstone (1914–1975), British nobleman and army officer
- Sir Lancelot Henry Elphinstone (1879–1965), English lawyer, Attorney-General of Ceylon
- Margaret Elphinstone (born 1948), Scottish writer
- Mary Elphinstone, Lady Elphinstone (1883–1961), British noblewoman
- Mountstuart Elphinstone (1779–1859), Scottish statesman and historian, Lieutenant-Governor of Bombay in British India
- Robert Elphinstone, 3rd Lord Elphinstone (d. 1602), Scottish landowner
- Sidney Elphinstone, 16th Lord Elphinstone (1869–1955), Governor of the Bank of Scotland
- William Elphinstone (1431–1514), Scottish statesman, Bishop of Aberdeen and founder of the University of Aberdeen
- William George Keith Elphinstone (1782–1842), British general
- William Elphinstone, 15th Lord Elphinstone (1828–1893), Scottish politician

== See also ==
- James Elphinston (1721–1809), Scottish educator, orthographer, phonologist and linguistics expert
