= Howard Elphinstone =

Howard Elphinstone may refer to:

- Sir Howard Craufurd Elphinstone (1829–1890), Major-General in the Crimean War
- Sir Howard Elphinstone, 1st Baronet (1773–1846), Major-General in the Peninsular War
- Sir Howard Elphinstone, 2nd Baronet (1804–1893), Liberal MP
- Sir Howard Elphinstone, 3rd Baronet (1830–1917), legal academic
- Sir Howard Graham Elphinstone, 4th Baronet (1898–1975) of the Elphinstone baronets
