= Douglas Elphinstone =

Sir Douglas Maurice Warburton Elphinstone, 5th Baronet, TD, FFA, FRSE (13 April 1909 – 5 December 1995) was a Scottish baronet.

== Life ==
He was born on 13 April 1909 in Eynsford in Kent, the eldest son of Rev Canon Maurice Curteis Elphinstone, vicar of Sowerby Bridge (son of Sir Howard Warburton Elphinstone, 3rd Baronet) and his wife Christiana Georgina Almond (daughter of Hely Hutchinson Almond, former headmaster of Loretto School).

Due to this family connection, he attended Loretto School then won a place at Jesus College, Cambridge studying mathematics, graduating BA in 1931. He was elected a Scholar of Jesus College. He then moved to Edinburgh as an actuary for Standard Life Assurance Company. However, he transferred back to London with the company. In 1938, he moved to Equity & Law Life Assurance Society.

During the Second World War he fought in the London Scottish Regiment and gained the rank of Major. He later joined the Sierra Leone Regiment. His final years in the war were spent in London doing statistical research under Francis Albert Eley Crew and Lancelot Hogben.

In 1948 he was elected a Fellow of the Royal Society of Edinburgh. His proposers were Francis Albert Eley Crew, Sir Edmund Whittaker, Lancelot Hogben, and Alexander Aitken. In 1956 he became a partner in Robert Wigram & Company, stockbrokers. He was a member of the London Stock Exchange from 1957 to 1974.

He retired in 1973/74 and moved to Scotby near Carlisle. In 1975, following the death of his cousin, Sir Howard Graham Elphinstone, he became the 5th Baronet of Sowerby.

He died at Holme Eden Abbey (a retirement home) on 5 December 1995.

== Family ==
He married Helen Barbara Main, daughter of George Ramsay Main on 30 June 1943. They had one son (Sir John Howard Main Elphinstone) and one daughter (Janet Christine Helen Elphinstone). On his death his son succeeded him as 6th baronet.

Baronetage of the United Kingdom
Preceded by Howard Elphinstone	Baronet (of Sowerby); 1975–1995	Succeeded by John Elphinstone
