= John Elphinstone (disambiguation) =

John Elphinstone (1722–1785), was a British naval officer.

John Elphinstone may also refer to:

- John Elphinstone, 13th Lord Elphinstone (1807–1860), Scottish soldier, politician and colonial administrator
- John Elphinstone, 2nd Lord Balmerino (died 1649), Scottish aristocrat
- John Elphinstone, 17th Lord Elphinstone (1914–1975), British nobleman
- John Elphinstone (courtier) (1553–1614), Scottish courtier
- Sir John Elphinstone, 2nd Baronet (1675–1732), of the Elphinstone baronets
- Sir John Elphinstone, 4th Baronet (c. 1717–1743), of the Elphinstone baronets
- Sir John Elphinstone, de jure 5th Baronet (1665–1758), of the Elphinstone baronets
- Sir John Elphinstone, de jure 7th Baronet (1771–1835), of the Elphinstone baronets
- Sir John Elphinstone, de jure 9th Baronet (1834–1893), of the Elphinstone baronets
- Sir John Elphinstone, 11th Baronet (born 1924), of the Elphinstone baronets
- Sir John Howard Main Elphinstone, 6th Baronet (born 1949), of the Elphinstone baronets
