= Ewen MacPherson of Cluny =

Scottish Jacobite

Coat of arms of the chiefs of Clan MacPherson

Ewen MacPherson of Cluny, known as "Cluny Macpherson" (11 February 1706 – 30 January 1764), was the Chief of Clan MacPherson during the Jacobite Rising of 1745. He took part as a leading supporter of Prince Charles Edward Stuart. After the rebellion was crushed, he went into hiding and eventually escaped to France. He was the uncle of poet James Macpherson, who collected, translated, and adapted the epic poem Ossian, based upon the Fenian Cycle of Celtic mythology.

== Early life ==
Cluny MacPherson was born on 11 February 1706. He was the first-born son of Lachlan MacPherson of Nuide (1674-1746). His mother was Jean Cameron, a daughter of Sir Ewen Cameron of Lochiel.

Cluny grew up to be a respected individual. His father-in-law, Lord Lovat, described him as "a thorrow good natur'd, even temper'd, honest gentleman". Physically he was described as "of a low stature, very square, and a dark brown complection".

== Clan MacPherson ==
The territory of the Clan MacPherson covered Badenoch, south-east of Loch Ness, but the Macphersons were also part of a federation of other clans, called the Chattan Confederation (also called Clan Chattan). This alliance, which dated back to the 13th century, included the Mackintoshes, MacGillivrays, Davidsons, Shaws, and others. A meeting of these allied clans in 1724 established that leadership was with the Mackintoshes.

== 1742 ==
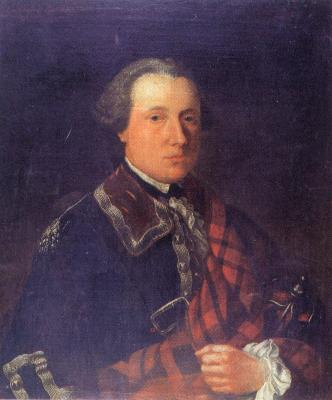
Donald Cameron of Lochiel

The year 1742 marked his arrival into the interconnected world of Scottish affairs. On marrying Lord Lovat's daughter Jean (Jenny) in 1742, Cluny took over management of his father's estate. At the request of the Duke of Gordon (the clan's feudal superior), he undertook to protect a wide area of land from cattle thieving.

Also in 1742, he signed a bond of friendship with his father-in-law Simon Fraser (chief of Clan Fraser) and with his cousin, Donald Cameron of Lochiel (chief of Clan Cameron), "binding themselves and their followers to stand by and support each other". This was an attempt to loosen the tie to the Mackintoshes, and may have been a factor in his later recruitment to the Jacobite cause.

== The '45 ==
In August 1745, with rumours of a Jacobite uprising circulating, the government offered Cluny command of an independent company in Lord Loudon's regiment. This required swearing an oath of allegiance to George II. Once Charles Edward Stuart raised his standard at Glenfinnan in that same month, Cluny was in a bind. His clan had been Jacobite in 1715, but not all were similarly inclined thirty years later. A historian has noted that he "had no particular reason, economic, political or religious, strong enough to propel him into the Jacobite camp". Moreover, his wife Jenny wanted her husband to remain faithful to the government.

Cluny did remain loyal to the government, to the extent of turning up with his company to assist the government general John Cope on his march north in August 1745 to head off the Jacobite army. However, as it was understrength, he was sent back by Cope to raise more troops. Then, whilst home in Cluny Castle on the night of 28 August, he was taken prisoner by a Jacobite raiding party composed of Camerons (his mother's family). To some extent, he may have wanted to be taken prisoner. Taken to Perth, he emerged within two weeks as a newly minted colonel in the Jacobite army.

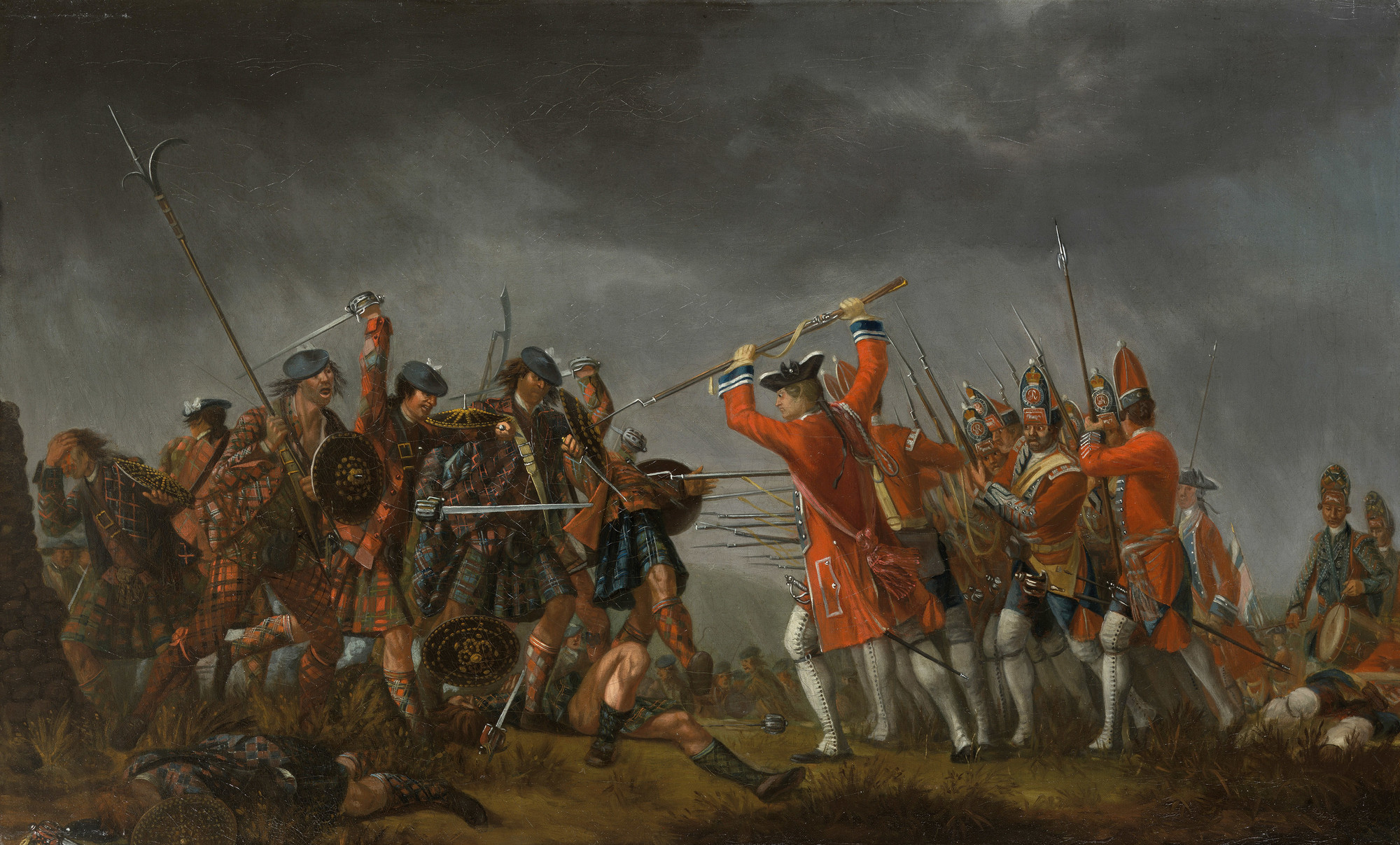
Battle of Culloden

He went north to raise troops for the Jacobite cause, but needed to use both persuasion and threats of violence to raise about 300 men. He was present at the Battle of Prestonpans on 21 September, when Cope's forces were routed in a 15-minute battle. He met Bonnie Prince Charlie at Holyrood House in Edinburgh in late October. In December he took part in an attack on the Duke of Cumberland's cavalry, at the Clifton Moor Skirmish, near Penrith. He was also present at the Battle of Falkirk Muir in January 1746. By February, with the Jacobite army retreating northwards, Cluny was sent ahead to raise more men, "burning the houses and killing the cattle of any reluctant to serve". Overall, his contribution to the Jacobite cause was described by Lord George Murray in March as "indefatigable".

He was not present at the Battle of Culloden in April, and went on the run after the Jacobite defeat there. His clansman surrendered in June, the same month Cluny House was plundered and burnt. On the last day of June, his elderly father Lachlan died "of a broken heart among the ruins of his son's estate". His father-in-law Lovat was captured by government forces in this same month, whilst his cousin Cameron of Lochiel escaped to France in October with the Prince.

== In hiding ==
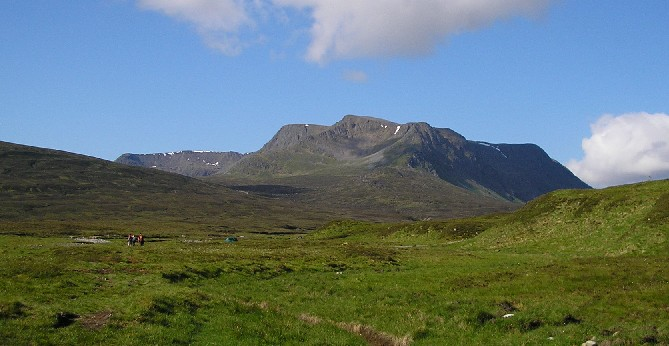
Ben Alder

Cluny spent the next nine years in hiding with a price on his head. In winter he was relatively safe from discovery. In summer, with troops on patrol, he led an itinerant existence. A report by a government officer suggested he "haunts the houses of his kindred and his wife's in the day time, and he has proper places of retirement in the night time, to which he repairs by turns, according to the danger he (fears) he's in, from the different motions of the troops". He had many hiding places, although his most famous one was a small cave on Ben Alder, known as "the Cage". It was in an area "full of great stones and crevices and some scattered wood interspersed". Luckily, the colour of the rock obscured any smoke.

The Cage was no larger than to contain six or seven persons, four of which number were frequently employed in playing at cards, one idle looking on, one becking (baking), and another firing bread and cooking

It is here he spent a week with Charles Edward Stuart in September. It is also where the fictional character David Balfour meets Cluny in the novel Kidnapped by Robert Louis Stevenson.

== Escape to France ==
In September 1754, Charles Edward Stuart (then living incognito in Paris) asked Cluny to come, and to bring any effects or money he had left over from the rebellion, "for I hapen to be in great strets". So, still with a price on his head, Cluny travelled through Edinburgh and arrived in London, where he spent several days among Jacobite sympathisers (possibly at the home of his wife's half-brother, Archibald Fraser). He then went to Dover and arrived in Calais in May 1755. His prince had moved to Basel, Switzerland, at that point, which is where Cluny also went. It was not a happy reunion. The often intoxicated Prince expected Cluny to account for the large sum of money given to him in 1746 to distribute among the disaffected and "to keep up the spirit of Jacobitism". This money became known as the Loch Arkaig Treasure, and is rumoured to still be buried there.

== Later life ==
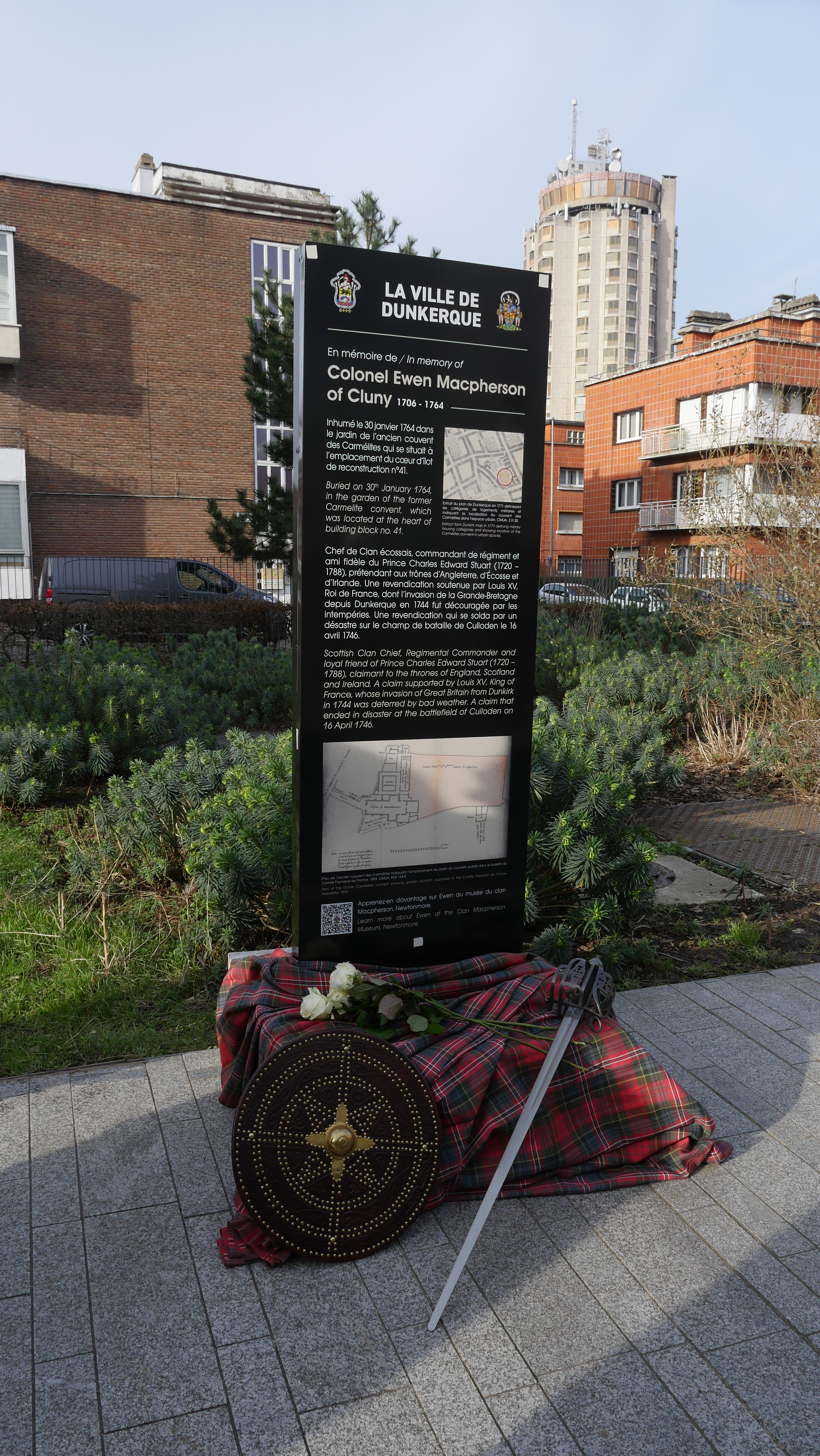

His wife Jenny and daughter Margaret, aged 14, soon joined him in France. His son Duncan (b. 1748) stayed behind to be educated in Inverness. By 1763, he was living in some poverty in Dunkirk. After a long ailment, he died there on 30 January 1764. He was buried in the Garden of the Carmelites, with his wife refusing French military honours at his funeral, since they had not supported him financially. (He held a commission in the Royal Ecossais regiment but the pay was meagre). His wife returned to Edinburgh, where she died the following year.

On 28 January 2024, for the 260th anniversary of his death, the Clan Macpherson with the help of Dunkirk town hall, inaugurated a memorial in his honor. Near the Carmelite garden, the 28th clan chief, James Brodie Macpherson of Cluny, came to inaugurate the memorial alongside the Very Reverend Allan Maclean of Dochgarroch, who blessed the memorial with water from the Cluny estate, with Anthony Rocquet Macpherson who found the location of the last remains of Cluny, and clansmen and clanswomen from Scotland, England, France and Belgium.

== Descendants ==
His daughter Margaret (1743–1808) married her cousin Duncan Macpherson. All of their children died without issue, three in the service of Britain: John died in India, Simon drowned at sea, Adam died at the Battle of Cape St Vincent, Ewan in childhood, whilst the youngest Robert died of old age but unmarried.

His son Duncan (1748–1817) continued his education on the continent, and had become a captain in the British army by the time he was 23, eventually serving with the 63rd Regiment of Foot in the American War of Independence. Whilst in North America he joined the 71st Fraser Highlanders as a major in 1776, rising to Lieutenant-Colonel and participating in several battles. On returning to Britain in 1781, he was captured by an American privateer and spent 16 months as a prisoner of war in New England before returning home.

An act of Parliament in 1784 restored Col. Duncan MacPherson to the estates of his father, as 13th Chief. At the age of 50, he married a second cousin, Catherine Cameron, daughter of Sir Ewen Cameron, 1st Bt, and they had four sons and four daughters.

== Bibliography ==
- Duffy, Christopher (2003) The '45. Bonnie Prince Charlie and the Untold Story of the Jacobite Rising. London: Orion Books. ISBN 978-0-7538-2262-3.
- Fraser, Sarah (2012) The Last Highlander: Scotland's Most Notorious Clan Chief, Rebel and Double Agent. London: Harper Press. ISBN 978-0-00-722949-9.
- Horsburgh, Davie (1984) "Macpherson, Ewen, of Cluny", in Oxford Dictionary of National Biography. (1984) Vol. 35.
- Lenman, Bruce (1984) The Jacobite Clans of the Great Glen. Dalkeith: Scottish Cultural Press. ISBN 1 898218 19 6.
- Macpherson, Alan Gibson (1996) A Day's March to Ruin: The Badenoch Men in the 'Forty-five and Col. Ewen Macpherson of Cluny. Newtonmore: Clan MacPherson Association. ISBN 0952858703.
