= William Beardmore =

William Beardmore may refer to:

- William Beardmore, 1st Baron Invernairn (1856–1936), British industrialist
  - William Beardmore and Company
- William Beardmore (cricketer) (1894–1978), Scottish cricketer and British Army officer
