= Hely Hutchinson Almond =

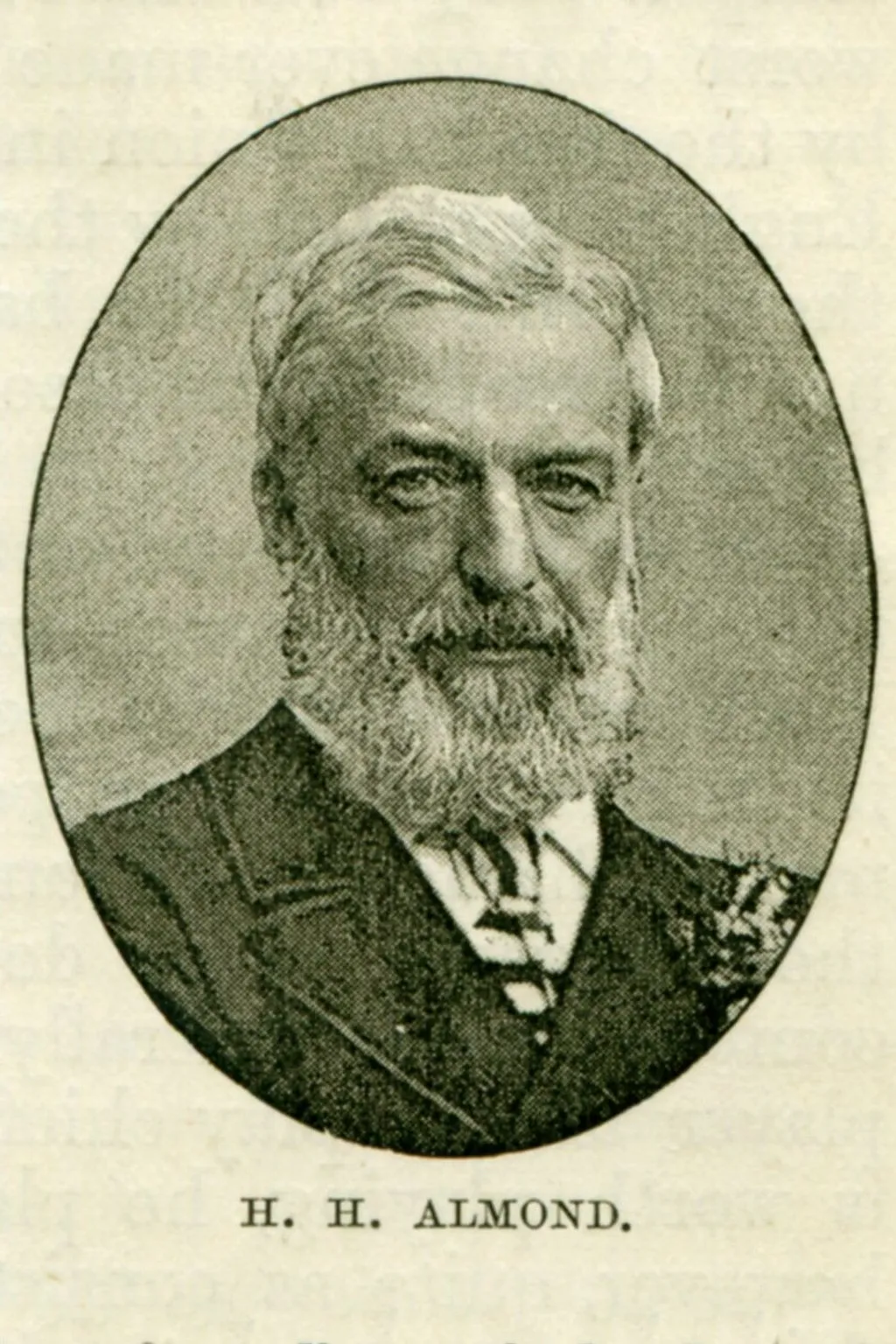
- Born: Hely Hutchinson Almond; 12 August 1832 Glasgow, Scotland
- Died: 7 March 1903 (aged 70)
- Occupation(s): School headmaster, Loretto School

Rugby union career
Amateur team(s)
Years	Team	Apps	(Points)
- Oxford University RFC
Refereeing career
Years	Competition		Apps
- Scotland v England

Hely Hutchinson Almond (12 August 1832 – 7 March 1903) was a Scottish classics scholar, headmaster of Loretto School from 1862 to 1903.

== Early life ==
Almond was born in 1832 in Glasgow, a son of the Reverend George Almond. In 1845, he entered Glasgow College, the secondary school of the university, where he was awarded the Cowan Gold Medal in the Blackstone Latin Examination and gained first prizes in Greek and Junior Mathematics. In 1850, he went on to Glasgow University, where in 1854 he graduated as a Master of Arts and was elected to a Snell Exhibition for postgraduate work at Balliol College, Oxford.

Almond was also notable as an athlete and was a member of the Balliol rowing eight. At Oxford he also started playing rugby.

== Career ==
In 1857, a distant relation, Charles Langhorne, headmaster of Loretto School, employed him as mathematical schoolmaster, and in the summer of 1859 he was appointed as second master at Merchiston Castle School, under Dr Harvey.

In the spring of 1862, Almond bought Loretto School, becoming its headmaster. Under his leadership, the school became the leading rugby nursery in Scotland. He remained in post until his death in 1903. In his Will he left the school to his widow, nominating as his successor his brother-in-law H. B. Tristram, who had been a master at the school since 1887.

Almond was one of the umpires of the first international rugby match at Raeburn Place, Edinburgh, in the 1871 Scotland versus England rugby union match, and was a supporter of the formation of the Scottish Football Union in 1873, which in 1924 was renamed as the Scottish Rugby Union. As an important of contributor to rugby football, in 2007 he was nominated for inclusion in the IRB Hall of Fame, although not inducted.

== Family ==
On 29 April 1876, in Durham, Almond married Miss Eleanora Frances Tristam, the sister of a boy he had educated at Loretto, and on 20 February 1877 their first child, George Hely Hutchinson Almond, was born. In 1878, a daughter, Christiana Georgiana, came into the world, and a second son, Henry Tristam, was born at Linkfield House.

In 1908, in Durham, Christiana Georgiana Almond married the Rev. Canon Maurice Elphinstone (1874–1969), vicar of Sowerby Bridge, a younger son of Sir Howard Warburton Elphinstone, 3rd Baronet. Their eldest son, born in 1909, became Sir Douglas Elphinstone, 5th Baronet FRSE.

George Hely Hutchinson Almond became a physician, and during the First World War was killed at Caix, France, while serving as a medical officer of the Royal Army Medical Corps attached to the 3rd Cavalry Field Ambulance.
