= Henry Raeburn =

Scottish portrait painter (1756–1823)

Sir Henry Raeburn RA RSA FRSE
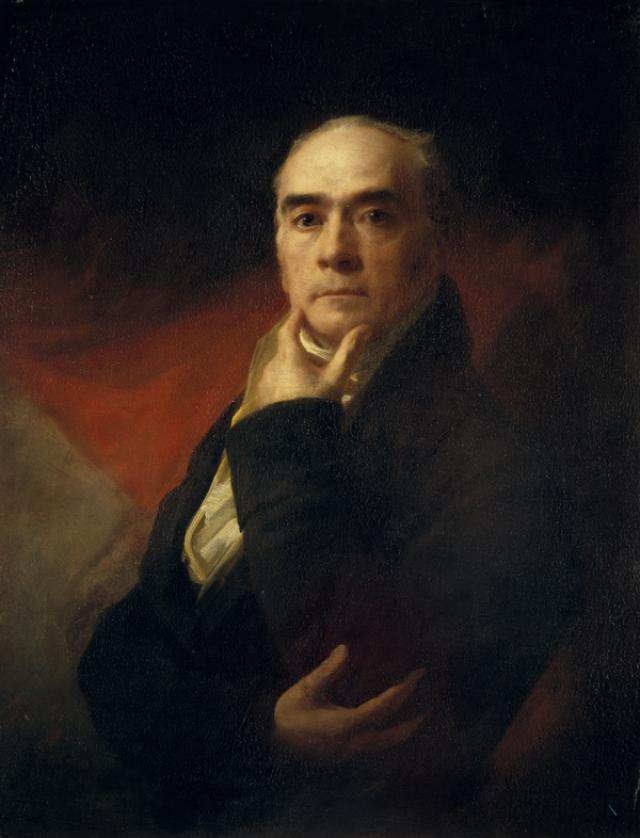
- Self-portrait, c. 1820
- Born: 4 March 1756; Stockbridge, Edinburgh, Scotland
- Died: 8 July 1823 (aged 67); Edinburgh, Scotland
- Known for: Portrait painting
- Spouse: Ann Edgar Leslie
- Elected: FRSE, RSA, RA
- Patrons: King George IV

Sir Henry Raeburn RA RSA FRSE (/ˈreɪbərn/; 4 March 1756 – 8 July 1823) was a Scottish portrait painter. He served as Portrait Painter to King George IV in Scotland.

== Biography ==
Raeburn was born the son of a manufacturer in Stockbridge, on the Water of Leith: a former village now within the city of Edinburgh. He had an older brother, born in 1744, called William Raeburn. His ancestors were believed to have been soldiers, and may have taken the name "Raeburn" from a hill farm in Annandale, held by Sir Walter Scott's family. Orphaned, he was supported by William and placed in Heriot's Hospital, where he received an education. At the age of fifteen he was apprenticed to the goldsmith James Gilliland of Edinburgh, and various pieces of jewellery, mourning rings and the like, adorned with minute drawings on ivory by his hand, still exist. When the medical student Charles Darwin died in 1778, his friend and professor Andrew Duncan took a lock of his student's hair to the jeweller whose apprentice, Raeburn, made a memorial locket.

Soon he took to the production of carefully finished portrait miniatures; meeting with success and patronage, he extended his practice to oil painting, at which he was self-taught. Gilliland watched the progress of his pupil with interest, and introduced him to David Martin, who had been the favourite assistant of Allan Ramsay, and was now the leading portrait painter in Edinburgh. Raeburn was especially aided by the loan of portraits to copy. Soon he had gained sufficient skill to make him decide to devote himself exclusively to painting. George Chalmers (1776; Dunfermline Town Hall) is his earliest known portrait.

In his early twenties, Raeburn was asked to paint the portrait of a young lady he had noticed when he was sketching from nature in the fields. Ann was the daughter of Peter Edgar of Bridgelands, and widow of Count James Leslie of Deanhaugh. Fascinated by the handsome and intellectual young artist, she became his wife within a month, bringing him an ample fortune. The acquisition of wealth did not affect his enthusiasm or his industry, but spurred him on to acquire a thorough knowledge of his craft. It was usual for artists to visit Italy, and Raeburn set off with his wife. In London he was kindly received by Sir Joshua Reynolds, the president of the Royal Academy, who advised him on what to study in Rome, especially recommending the works of Michelangelo, and gave Raeburn letters of introduction for Italy. In Rome he met his fellow Scot Gavin Hamilton, Pompeo Batoni and James Byres, an antique dealer whose advice proved particularly useful, especially the recommendation that "he should never copy an object from memory, but, from the principal figure to the minutest accessory, have it placed before him." After two years of study in Italy he returned to Edinburgh in 1787, and began a successful career as a portrait painter. In that year he executed a seated portrait of the 2nd Lord Arniston, Lord President of the Court of Session.

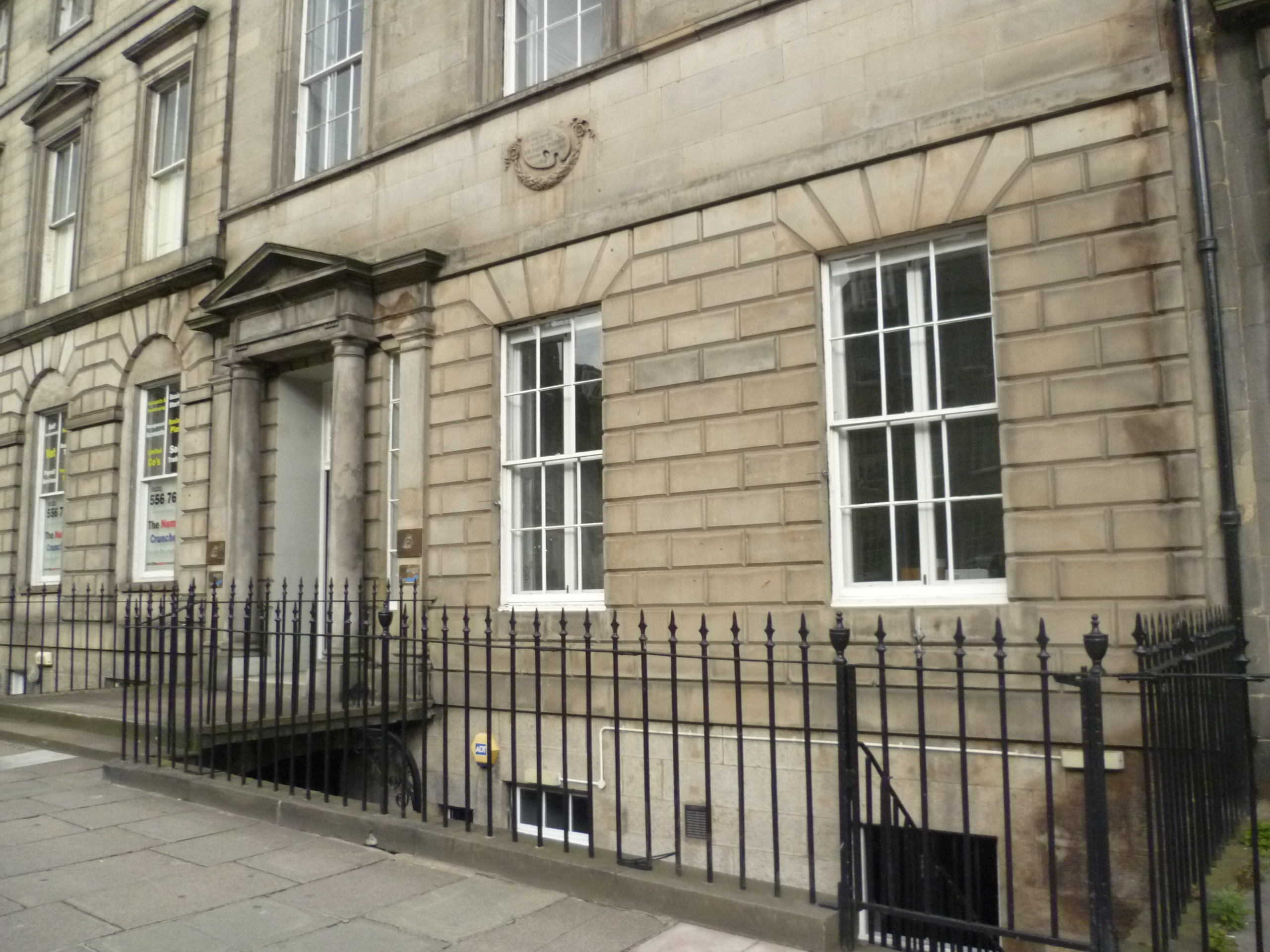
Raeburn's studio in Edinburgh's New Town

Examples of his earlier portraiture include a bust of Mrs Johnstone of Baldovie and a three-quarter-length of Dr James Hutton: works which, if somewhat timid and tentative in handling and not as confident as his later work, nevertheless have delicacy and character. The portraits of John Clerk, Lord Eldin, and of Principal Hill of St Andrews belong to a later period. Raeburn was fortunate in the time in which he practised portraiture. Sir Walter Scott, Hugh Blair, Henry Mackenzie, Lord Woodhouselee, William Robertson, John Home, Robert Fergusson, and Dugald Stewart were resident in Edinburgh, and were all painted by Raeburn. Mature works include his own portrait and that of Sir Henry Moncrieff Wellwood, a bust of Dr Wardrop of Torbane Hill, two full-lengths of Adam Rolland of Gask, the remarkable paintings of Lord Newton and Dr Alexander Adam in the National Gallery of Scotland, and that of William Macdonald of St Martin's. Apart from himself, Raeburn painted only two artists, one of whom was Sir Francis Leggatt Chantrey, the most important and famous British sculptor of the first half of the 19th century. It has recently been revealed that Raeburn and Chantrey were close friends and that Raeburn took exceptional care over the execution of his portrait of the sculptor, one of the painter's mature bust-length masterpieces.

It was commonly believed that Raeburn was less successful in painting female portraits, but the exquisite full-length of his wife, the smaller likeness of Mrs R. Scott Moncrieff in the National Gallery of Scotland, and that of Mrs Robert Bell, and others, argue against this. Raeburn spent his life in Edinburgh, rarely visiting London, and then only for brief periods, thus preserving his individuality.

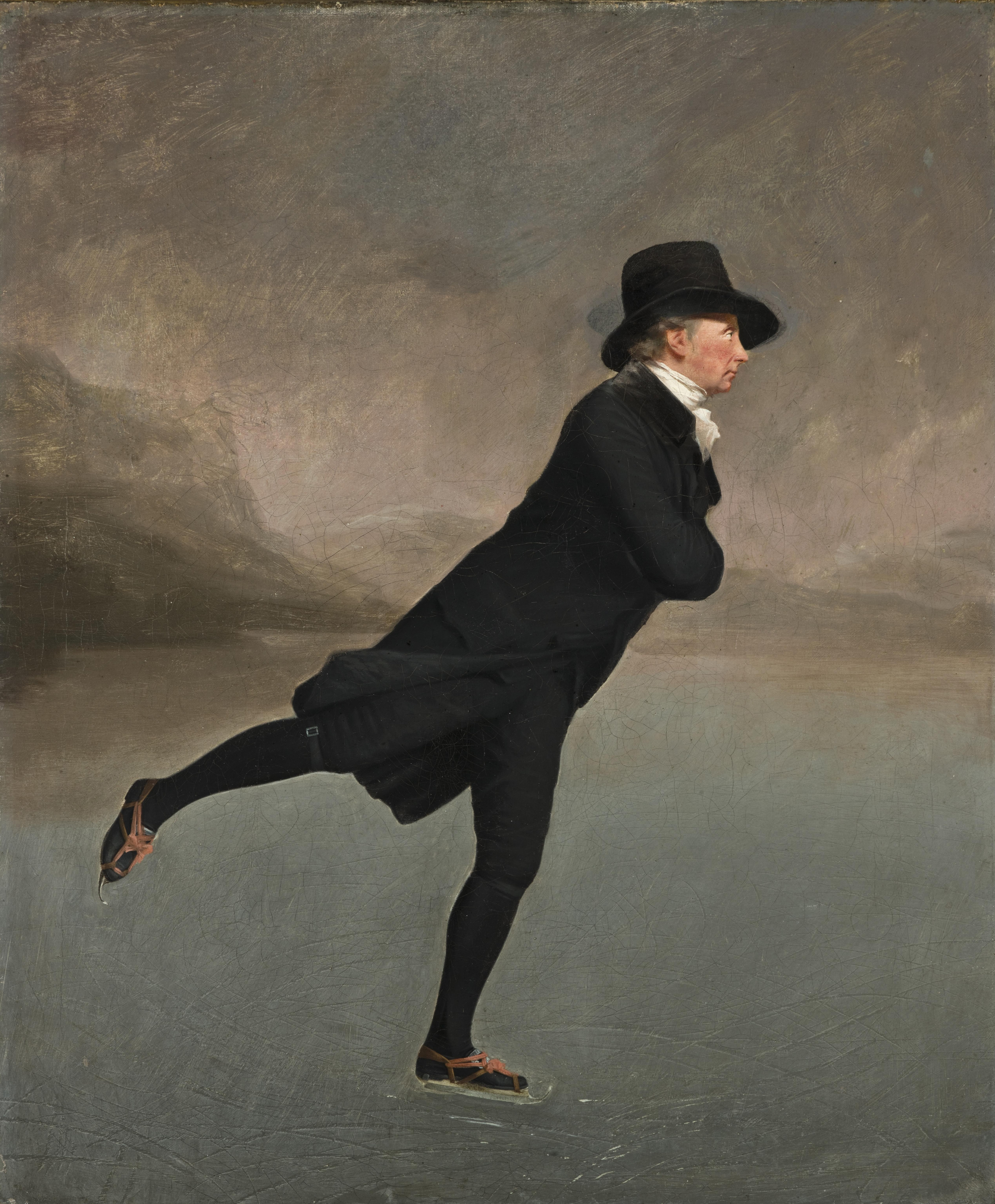
The Reverend Robert Walker Skating on Duddingston Loch, better known as The Skating Minister (1790s), Scottish National Gallery

Although he, personally, may have lost advantages resulting from closer association with the leaders of English art, and from contact with a wider public, Scottish art gained much from his disinclination to leave his native land. He became the acknowledged chief of the school which was growing up in Scotland during the early 19th century, and his example and influence at a critical period were of major importance. So varied were his other interests that sitters used to say of him, "You would never take him for a painter till he seizes the brush and palette."

In 1812, he was elected president of the Society of Artists in Edinburgh; and in 1814 associate, and in the following year full member, of the Royal Scottish Academy. On 29 August 1822, he received a knighthood during the visit of King George IV to Scotland and appointed His Majesty's limner for Scotland at Hopetoun House. He died in Edinburgh not long after on 8 July 1823.

Raeburn had all the essential qualities of a popular and successful portrait painter. He was able to produce a telling and forcible likeness; his work is distinguished by powerful characterisation, stark realism, dramatic and unusual lighting effects, and swift and broad handling of the most resolute sort. David Wilkie recorded that, while travelling in Spain and studying the works of Diego Velázquez, the brushwork reminded him constantly of the "square touch" of Raeburn. Scottish physician and writer John Brown wrote that Raeburn "never fails in giving a likeness at once vivid, unmistakable and pleasing. He paints the truth, and he paints it with love".

Raeburn has been described as a "famously intuitive" portrait painter. He was unusual amongst many of his contemporaries, such as Reynolds, in the extent of his philosophy of painting directly from life; he made no preliminary sketches. This attitude partly explains the often coarse modelling and clashing colour combinations he employed, in contrast to the more refined style of Thomas Gainsborough and Reynolds. However these qualities and those mentioned above anticipate many of the later developments in painting of the 19th century from romanticism to Impressionism.

== Forgotten portrait of Robert Burns on public display for first time ==
The Glasgow Herald reported in January 2026 that a "long-lost" portrait of Robert Burns was being put on display; firstly in Edinburgh's National Galleries. From 21st July, it is scheduled to be transferred to the Robert Burns Birthplace Museum in Alloway. According to the newspaper, the painting, which had been missing for more than 200 years, had been found in a house clearance in Surrey.

Sir Henry Raeburn died in St Bernard's House, Stockbridge, Edinburgh. He is buried in St. Cuthbert's churchyard against the east wall (the monument erected by Raeburn in advance) but also has a secondary memorial in the Church of St John the Evangelist, Edinburgh. His studio on York Place was taken over by the artist Colvin Smith.

== Subjects ==
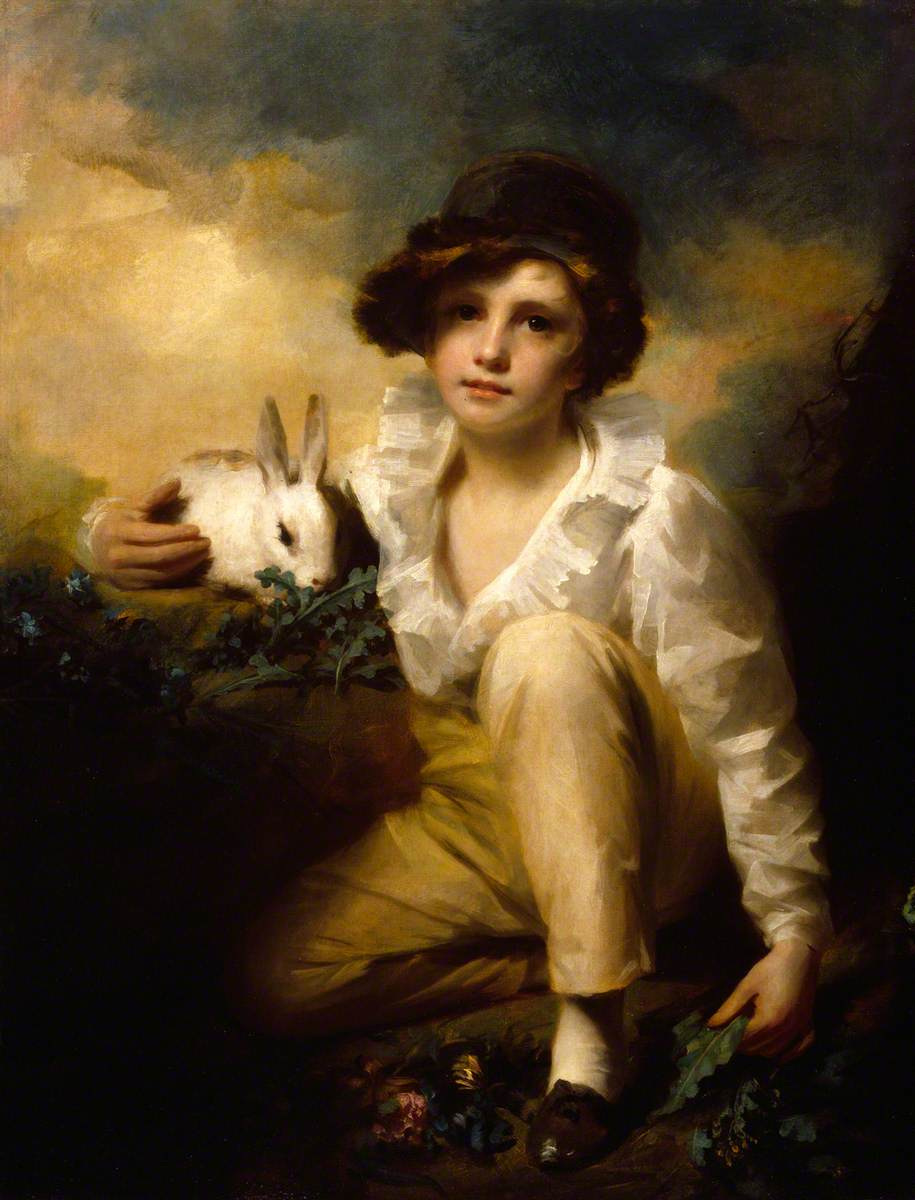
Boy and Rabbit, 1814. His diploma work on his election to the Royal Academy that year

Raeburn made more than a thousand paintings spanning 50 years. His subjects include:

- Rev Robert Dickson
- Sir George Abercromby, 4th Baronet
- Countess of Aboyne, (Lady Mary Douglas, daughter of James, fourteenth Earl of Morton)
- Dr Alexander Adam
- Robert Adam
- Mrs Robert Adam
- Archibald Alison
- Alexander Allan
- David Anderson
- Sir David Baird
- Mrs Henry Balfour (Jane Elliot)
- Lady Belhaven
- Mrs George Bell
- Mrs E Bethune
- The Binning children
- Hugh Blair
- Mrs Irvine J Boswell
- Helen Boyle
- Andrew Buchanon
- John Campbell of John Campbell Snr & Co.
- Colonel Alexander Campbell of Possil
- Mrs Alexander Campbell of Possil
- Sir Duncan Campbell, Scots Guards
- Master John Campbell of Saddell
- Rev. Alexander Carlyle
- Alexander Carre of Cavers
- Master Cathcart
- George Chalmers Esq. of Pittencrief
- Sir Francis Leggatt Chantrey
- Charles Christie
- Miss Jean Christie
- John Clerk, Lord Eldin
- Mrs Jean Cockburn Ross
- Jacobina Copland
- William Creech
- John Crichton-Stuart, 2nd Marquess of Bute
- James Cruikshank
- Mrs James Cruikshank
- John Cuninghame of Craigends
- Mrs Alexander Dirom, (Anne Fotheringham)
- Lady Harriet Don, with her son
- Lord Douglas (Earl of Home), as a student
- Elizabeth Douglas of Brigton (née Graham)
- Margaret Douglas, of Brigton, afterwards Mrs. Hunter, of Burnside
- Rev. Robert Douglas, D.D., of Galashiels; died 1820
- Harley Drummond
- The Drummond children
- George Duff
- James Duff, 4th Earl Fife
- Norwich Duff
- Henry Dundas, 1st Viscount Melville
- Thomas Elder (Lord Provost of Edinburgh)
- Lady Elibank
- James Elphinstone of Logie
- William Fairlie
- Archibald Farquharson of Finzean
- Robert Fergusson and his brother Lieutenant-General Sir Ronald Fergusson, "The Archers" (Royal Company of Archers)
- William Forbes of Callendar (1756–1823), coppersmith and landowner
- Mrs Gevine
- Eleanor Margaret Gibson-Carmichael
- Karl Ludwig Giesecke
- William Glendonwyn
- Mrs Glendowyn and her daughter Mary
- Niel Gow
- John Gray of Carntyne
- Mrs James Gregory (Isabella McLeod)
- Mrs Elizabeth Hamilton (1757–1816), writer and educationalist
- Major James Lee Harvey, Gordon Highlanders
- Thomas Hay-Drummond, 11th Earl of Kinnoull
- Captain Hay of Spot
- Mrs Andrew Hay (Elizabeth Robinson)
- Mrs Alexander Henderson
- Principal George Hill of St Andrews
- Mrs George Hill
- John Home
- Charles Hope-Weir
- Hugh Hope
- Thomas Charles Hope, physician and chemist
- Francis Horner, political economist
- Dr James Hutton, geologist
- Captain Charles Inglis, naval officer
- Sir Patrick Inglis, 5th Baronet of Sunnyside
- John Jameson, founder of Jameson Irish Whiskey, and his wife Margaret Haig
- Francis Jeffrey, Lord Jeffrey
- John Johnstone, Betty Johnstone and Miss Wedderburn
- Mrs Johnston of Straiton
- Mrs Johnstone of Baldovie
- Dr Colin Lauder (1750–1831), FRCS, & Burgess of Edinburgh
- Zepherina Loughnan, Mrs Henry Veitch of Eliock
- William Macdonald of St Martin's
- Colonel Alexander Ranaldson MacDonell of Glengarry (1771–1828)
- Allan MacDougall WS of Gallanach and Hayfield
- Hay MacDowall
- Mrs George Mackay of Bighouse (Louisa Campbell)
- Henry Mackenzie
- Francis MacNab, The MacNab
- Robert McQueen, Lord Braxfield (1722–1799), Lord Justice-Clerk 1798
- George Malcolm
- Mrs Malcolm
- Mrs Hugh Smyth Mercer (née Wilson)
- Captain Patrick Miller
- Robert Scott Moncrieff
- Alexander Monro
- Sir James Montgomery, 2nd Baronet of Stanhope
- Thomas Mure of Warriston
- Sir William Nairne, Lord Dunsinane, 5th Baronet of Nairne
- Sir William Napier, Baronet
- Lord Newton
- Rev. Principal Nicoll, D.D.
- Mrs George Paterson of Huntly Castle
- Mrs James Paterson
- The Patterson children
- John Playfair
- Henry Raeburn
- Lady Raeburn
- Miss Davidson Reid
- John Rennie the Elder, engineer
- Professor William Richardson
- William Robertson
- Adam Rolland of Gask
- Daniel Rutherford
- Colonel Francis James Scott
- Sir Walter Scott
- Alexander Shaw
- Mrs Simpson
- Sir John Sinclair, 1st Baronet
- Dr. Nathaniel Spens
- Andrew Spottiswoode
- Dugald Stewart
- Mrs Anne Stewart
- Lieutenant General William Stuart (1778–1837)
- John Swinton, Lord Swinton
- John Tait and his grandson
- John Tait of Harvieston
- Rev John Thomson (1778–1840) of Duddingston
- Eliza Tod of Drygrange (née Pringle)
- Lady Anne Torphicen
- Captain Willian Tytler
- Miss Eleanor Urquhart
- James Usher of Toftfield
- Robert Walker (1755–1808) Skating on Duddingston Loch
- Dr Wardrop of Torbane Hill
- Sir Henry Moncrieff Wellwood
- Hugh William Williams
- Lord Woodhouselee
- Henry Wynyard
- Dr Rev David Johnston (1934 - 1824) Founder of Edinburgh Asylum for the Industrious Blind (now Royal Blind)

== Gallery ==
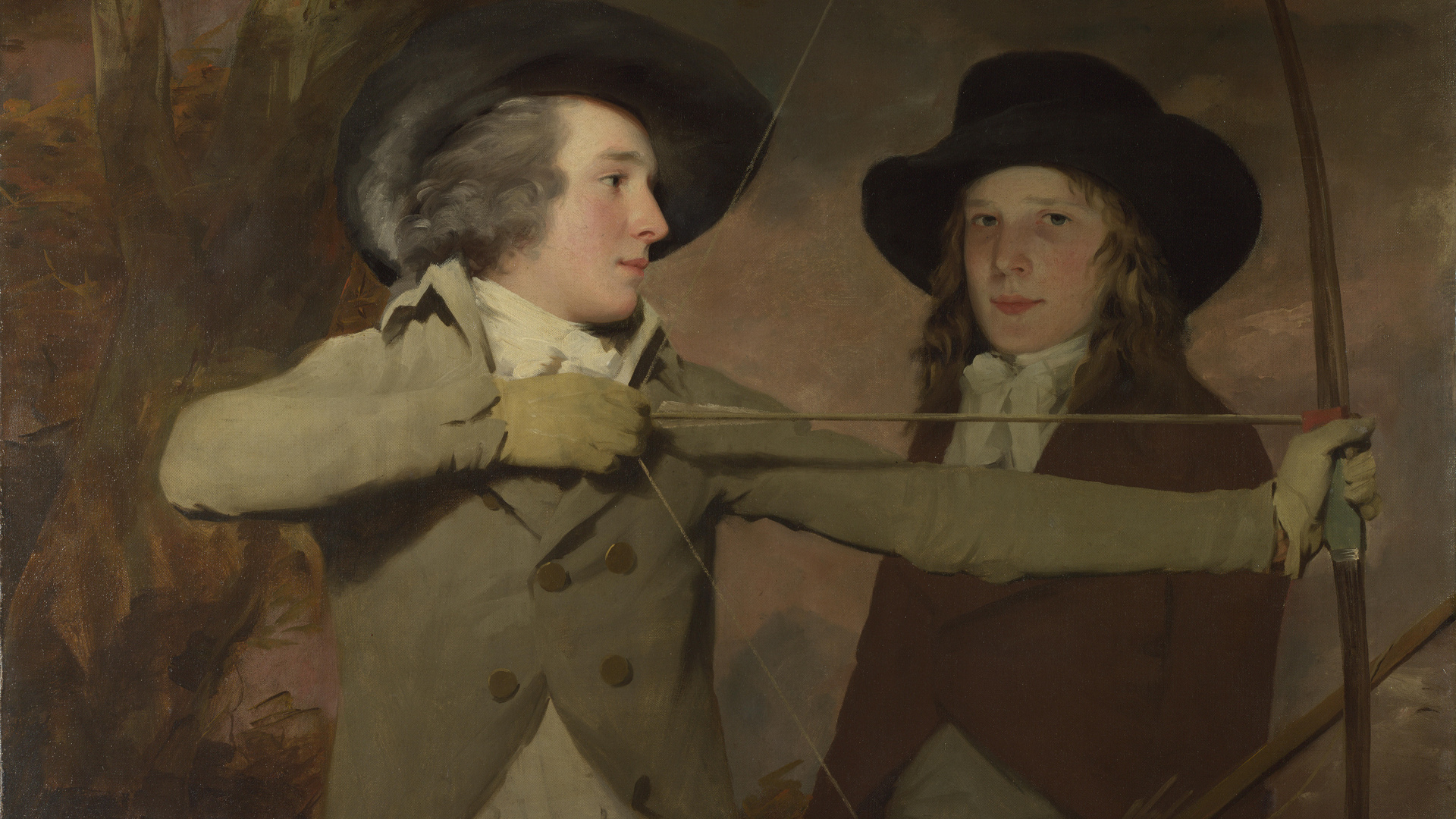
The Archers (between 1787 and 1792), National Gallery

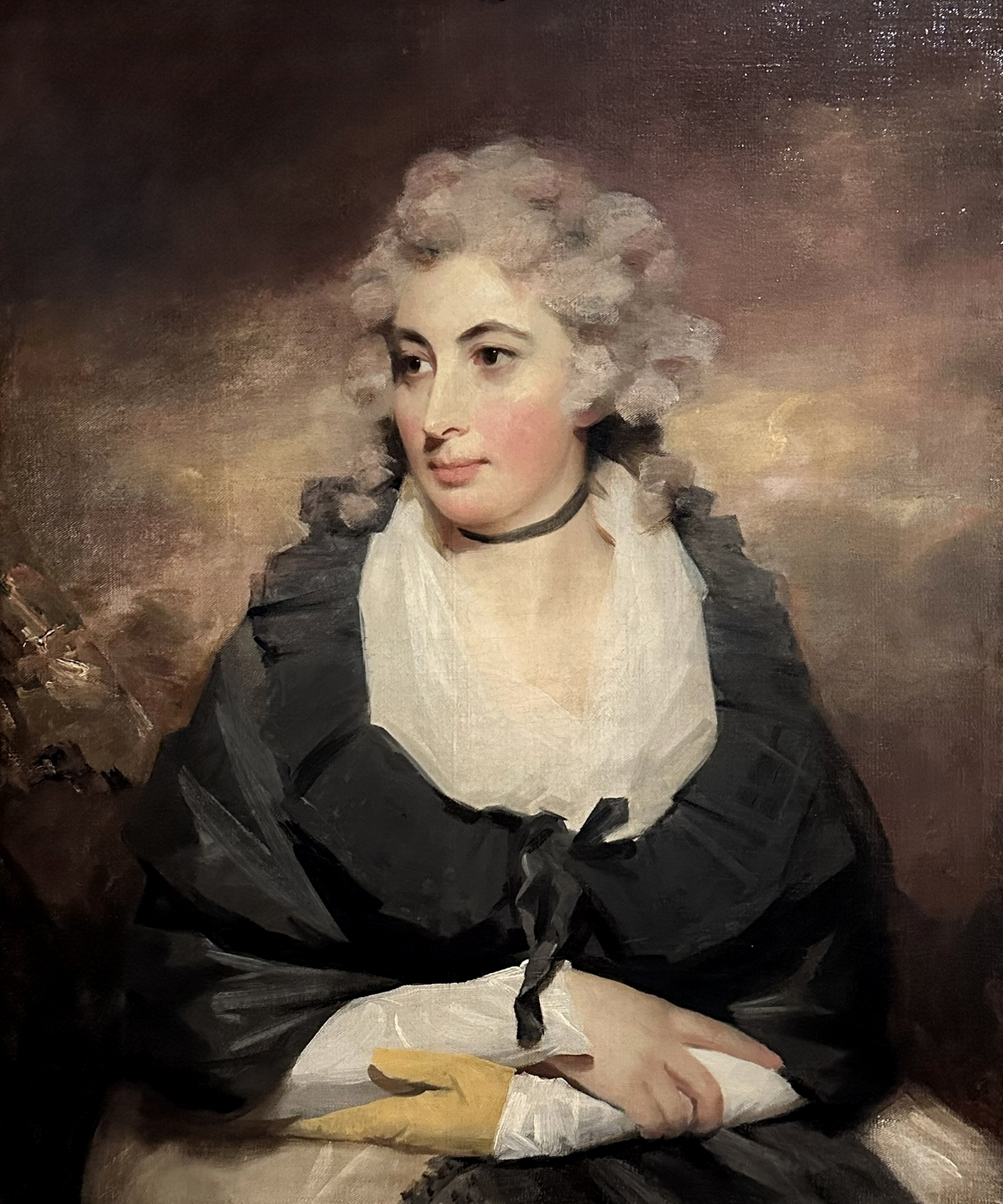
Mrs. Reay of Killingworth Hall, Northumberland (around 1790), Museum of the Shenandoah Valley

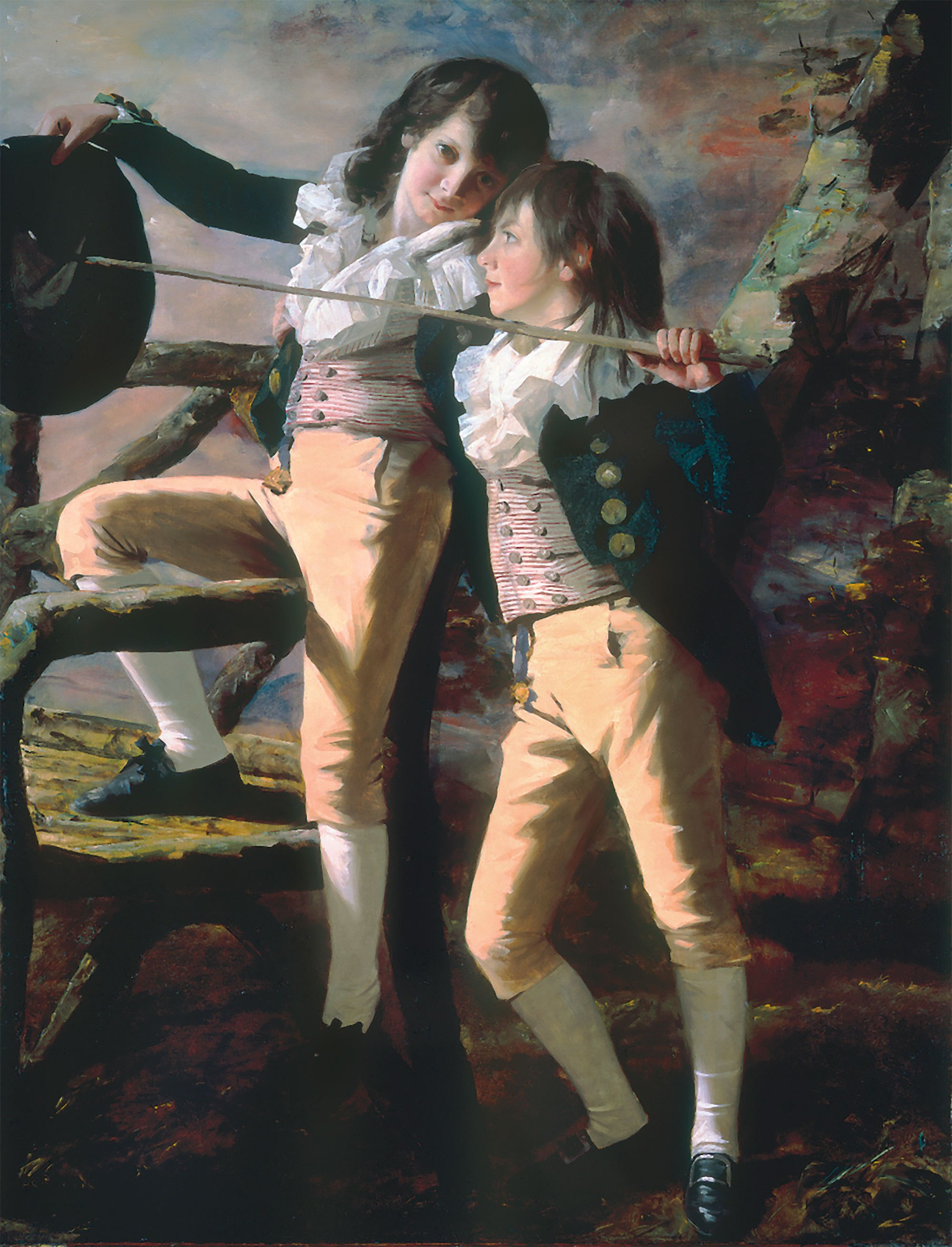
The Allen Brothers (Portrait of James and John Lee Allen) (early 1790s), Kimbell Art Museum

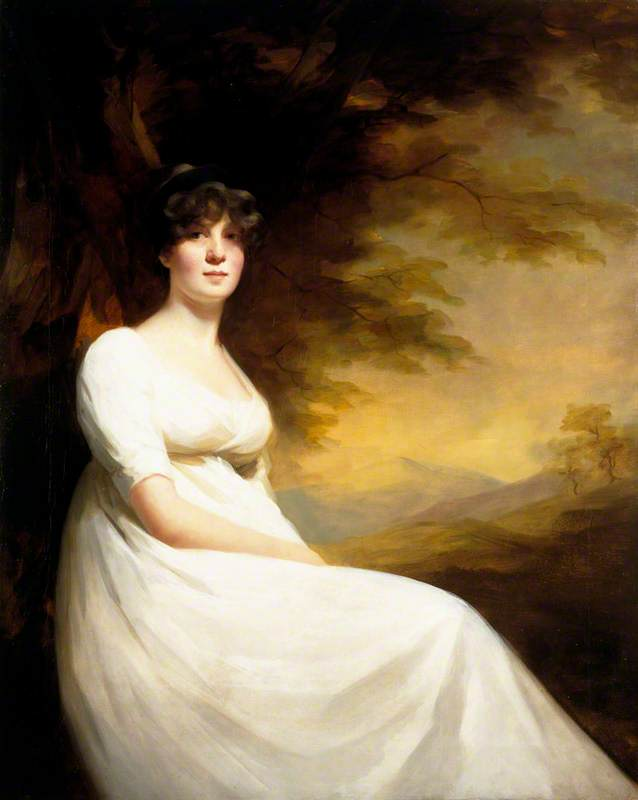
Elizabeth Forbes, Mrs Colin Mackenzie of Portmore (1805), Scottish National Gallery

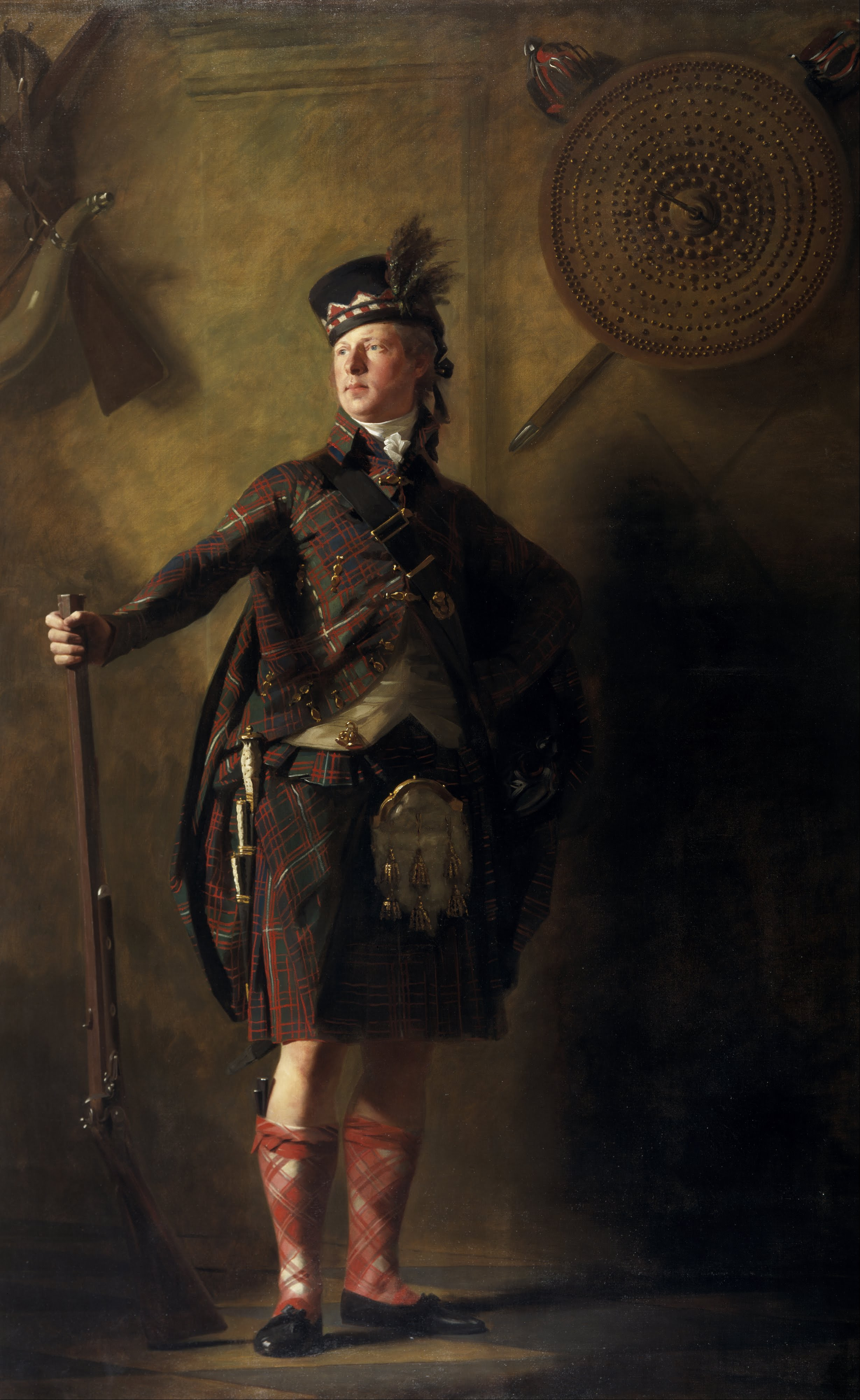
Colonel Alastair Ranaldson Macdonell of Glengarry (1771 - 1828) (1812), Scottish National Gallery

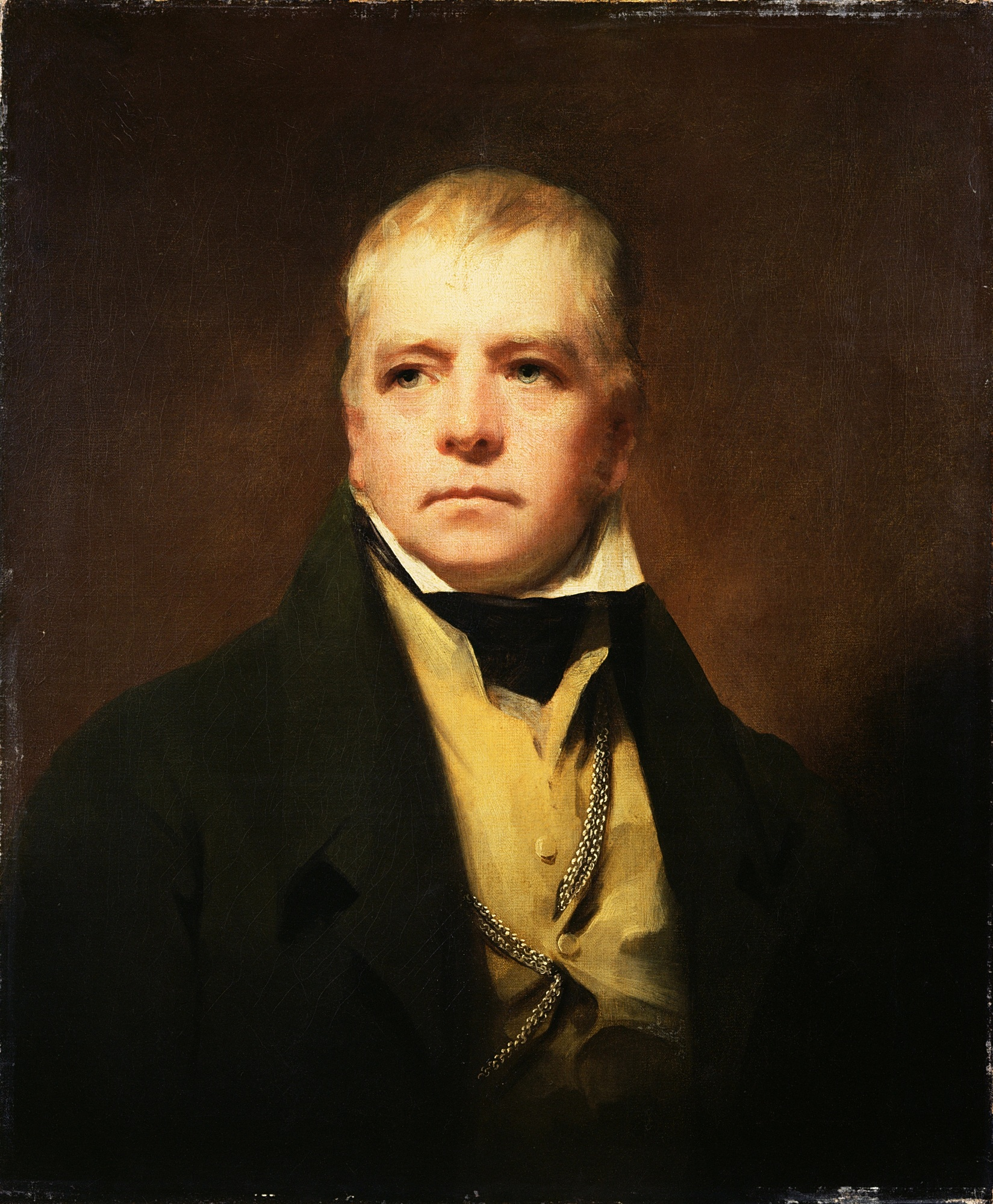
Sir Walter Scott (1822), Scottish National Gallery

== Bibliography ==
- Andrew, William Raeburn. Life of Sir Henry Raeburn, R. A. (London: W. H. Allen & co., 1886).
- Armstrong, Sir W. Sir Henry Raeburn (London, 1901.) – with copper plate reproductions from photographs by Thomas Annan
- Masters in Art, volume 6 (Boston, 1905) p. 423 ff.
- Coltman, V. (2013). Henry Raeburn's Portraits of Distant Sons in the Global British Empire. Art Bulletin, 95(2), 294–311.
- Clouston, R. S. Sir Henry Raeburn (London: G. Newnes, 1907).
- Caw, James Lewis. Raeburn (London, T. C. and E. C. Jack, 1909) – with colour plates of his paintings.
- Greig, James. Sir Henry Raeburn: His Life and Works (London: "The Connoisseur", 1911)
- Macmillan, Duncan (1984), Scottish Painting: Ramsay to Raeburn, in Parker, Geoffrey (ed.), Cencrastus No. 17, Summer 1984, pp. 25 – 29, ISSN 0264-0856
- "Raeburn, Henry" . Dictionary of National Biography. London: Smith, Elder & Co. 1885–1900.
- Coltman, Viccy, Stephen Lloyd, Henry Raeburn: Context, Reception and Reputation, Edinburgh University Press, 2012, 352 p.
