= Governor O'Brien =

Governor O'Brien may refer to:

- Charles O'Brien (colonial administrator) (1859–1935), Acting Governor of the Gambia from 1910 to 1912, Governor of the Seychelles from 1912 to 1918, and Governor of Barbados from 1918 to 1925
- George Thomas Michael O'Brien (1844–1906), Governor of Fiji from 1897 to 1901
- Terence O'Brien (colonial governor) (1830–1903), Acting Governor of British Ceylon from 1863 to 1865, Governor of Heligoland from 1881 to 1888, and Colonial Governor of Newfoundland from 1889 to 1895
- William O'Brien, 2nd Earl of Inchiquin (died 1692), Governor of Tangier from 1675 to 1680
