= James Elphinstone =

James Elphinstone may refer to:

- James Elphinstone, 1st Lord Balmerino (1553?–1612), Scottish nobleman and politician, disgraced in 1609
- James Elphinstone, 18th Lord Elphinstone, British nobleman, farmer, and financier
- James Elphinstone Roe (1818–1897), convict transported to Western Australia
- James Dalrymple-Horn-Elphinstone (1805–1886), British Conservative Party politician
- Sir James Elphinstone, 1st Baronet (c. 1645–1722), of the Elphinstone baronets
- Sir James Elphinstone, 3rd Baronet (c. 1710–1739), of the Elphinstone baronets

== See also ==
- James Elphinston (1721–1809), Scottish educator, orthographer, phonologist, and linguistics expert
