= Alan Sutherland =

Alan Sutherland may refer to:

- Alan Sutherland (artist)
- Alan Sutherland (rugby union)
