= William Elphinstone (disambiguation) =

William Elphinstone (1431–1514) was a Scottish bishop.

William Elphinstone may also refer to:

- Sir William Elphinstone, (died 1645), secretary to Elizabeth Stuart, Queen of Bohemia
- William George Keith Elphinstone (1782–1842), British Army officer
- William Elphinstone, 15th Lord Elphinstone (1828–1893), Scottish peer
- William Fullerton Elphinstone (1740–1834) East India Company ship's captain and Director.

== See also ==
- Elphinstone (surname)
