= Fassfern =

Coordinates: 56.85921°N 5.24294°W

Fassfern: Scottish Gaelic: An Fasadh Feàrna
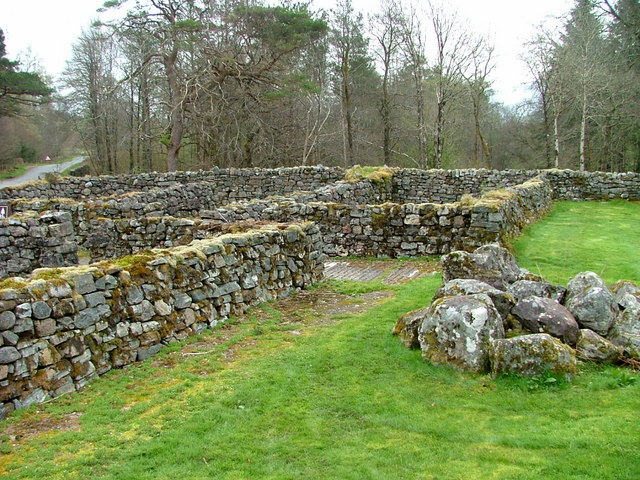

- Location within the Lochaber area
- OS grid reference: NN023788
- Council area: Highland
- Lieutenancy area: Inverness
- Country: Scotland
- Sovereign state: United Kingdom
- Post town: Fort William
- Postcode district: PH33 7
- Police: Scotland
- Fire: Scottish
- Ambulance: Scottish
- UK Parliament: Ross, Skye and Lochaber
- Scottish Parliament: Inverness East, Nairn and Lochaber

Fassfern (Scottish Gaelic: An Fasadh Feàrna) is a hamlet on the north shore of Loch Eil in the Scottish Highlands, at the bottom of Glen Suileag and almost opposite Duisky. Historically it was spelled Fassiefern.

Clan MacPhail as part of the Clan Chattan Federation is thought to have originated in this area around the 13th century but it eventually fell under the authority of Clan Cameron territory. It is just off the A830 from Fort William to Mallaig, and about 6 miles (10 km) west of Fort William in Lochaber, and is in the Scottish council area of Highland.

== See also ==
- John Cameron of Fassiefern
- Cameron baronets
