= John Cameron of Fassiefern =

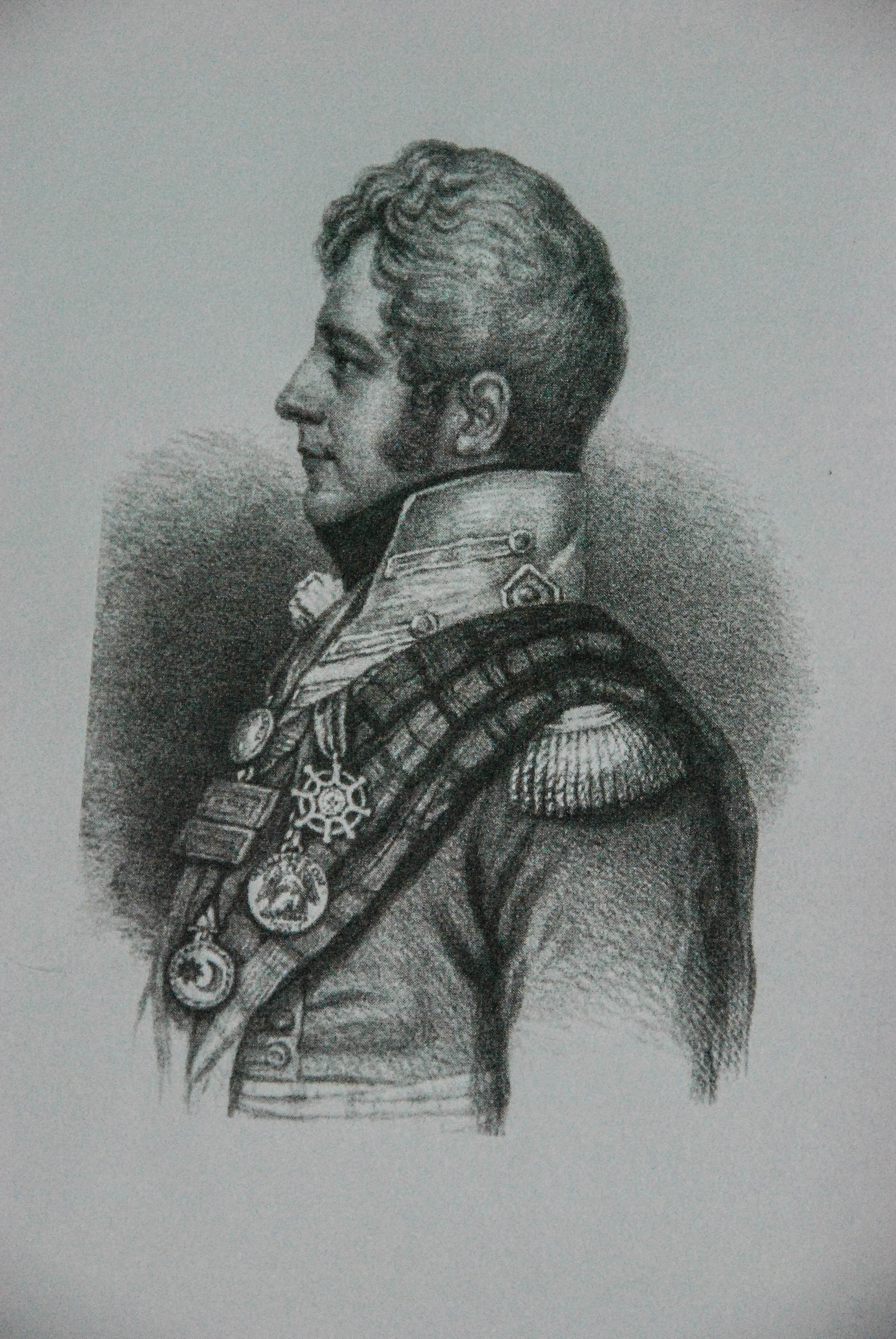
- Colonel Cameron
- Born: 16 August 1771; Inverscadale, Inverness-shire, Scotland
- Died: 16 June 1815 (aged 43); Quatre-Bras, Netherlands (now Genappe, Belgium)
- Burial place: Kilmallie
- Military career
- Allegiance: Great Britain
- Branch: British Army
- Rank: Colonel
- Unit: 92nd Highlanders
- Conflicts: French Revolutionary Wars; Peninsular War; Waterloo campaign

Colonel John Cameron of Fassiefern (1771–1815) of Fassiefern, Inverness-shire, was a celebrated Scottish military commander of the Napoleonic wars. He was a cousin of the Camerons of Lochiel.

Cameron served as Colonel of the Gordon Highlanders and was killed in action at the Battle of Quatre-Bras. The Prince Regent created his father a baronet in 1817 in recognition of Cameron's distinguished military service.

== Early life ==
John Cameron was born in Inverscadale by Loch Linnhe on 16 August 1771. He was one of six children of Sir Ewen Cameron, 1st Baronet, of Fassiefern in the parish of Kilmallie, and his first wife, Louisa (daughter of Duncan Campbell of Barcaldine and Glenure), (Note: John Cameron was a great-grandson of John Cameron 18th of Lochiel and eldest grandson of John Cameron of Fassiefern (1698-1785), (Mosley 2003b, p. 655).) Nursed by the wife of a family retainer whose son, Ewen McMillan, was his foster-brother and faithful attendant through life, young Cameron grew up in close sympathy with the traditions and associations of his home and people, who looked to his father as the representative head of the clan in the enforced absence of the chief of Lochiel. He received his schooling in part at Fort William Grammar School, but chiefly by private tuition, before going to King's College, Aberdeen. Cameron was then articled as a clerk in Edinburgh to James Fraser of Gorthleck, WS.

== French Revolutionary Wars ==
After the outbreak of the French Revolutionary Wars, at his special request, a commission was obtained for Cameron, and he entered the army in May 1793 as Ensign in the 26th Cameronians, before being promoted as lieutenant in a newly-formed Highland Company, attached to the old 93rd Foot (Shirley's, disbanded after Demerara).

In the following year, George, Marquess of Huntly (later George, 5th Duke of Gordon), Captain 3rd Foot Guards, raised a corps of Highlanders at Aberdeen, which originally was numbered as the 100th Foot, but a few years later was redesignated as the now 92nd Gordon Highlanders. Cameron was appointed to command a company in this regiment on 24 June 1794, serving in Corsica and Gibraltar from 1795 to 1797 and in the south of Ireland in 1798. There he is said to have fallen in love with a young Irish woman in Kilkenny, but the match was broken off in submission to his father's wishes.

The next year, 1799 Cameron served in North Holland, where he was wounded in the fierce battle on the sand dunes between Bergen and Egmont-op-Zee on 2 October, one of the last few occasions when bayonets were used in action. He served as a captain in his regiment at the occupation of the Île-d'Houat off Brittany and at Cadiz in 1800 before fighting in Egypt, where he was wounded at the Battle of Alexandria, receiving the Ottoman Porte Gold Medal for the Egyptian Campaign.

== Peninsular War ==
Cameron was promoted to major in the Cameron Highlanders in 1801, before appointment as lieutenant-colonel of a newly-formed second battalion (later disbanded) on 23 June 1808 which served mainly in Ireland.

Upon the return of 1st Battalion Gordon Highlanders from La Coruña, Cameron was transferred to its command and led the regiment in the Walcheren Campaign, subsequently proceeding to Portugal landing there on 8 October 1810. He and his troops distinguished themselves repeatedly during the succeeding campaigns, particularly at the Battle of Fuentes de Oñoro, 5 May 1811; at the Battle of Arroyo dos Molinos, 28 October 1811; at Battle of Almaraz, 19 May 1812; and at Battle of Vittoria, 21 June 1813, where his services appear to have been strangely overlooked in the award of honours; at the Passage of Maya, 13 July 1813; at the battles on the Nive between 9 and 13 December 1813; at the Passage of the Gave at Arriverette, 17 February 1814; and at the Capture of Acre (misprinted "Aire" in some accounts), 2 March 1814. Some particulars of the armorial and other honours bestowed upon Cameron in recognition of his military service can be found in Cannon's Historical Record, 92nd Highlanders and in Burke's Peerage & Baronetage.

== Waterloo Campaign and death at Quatre-Bras ==
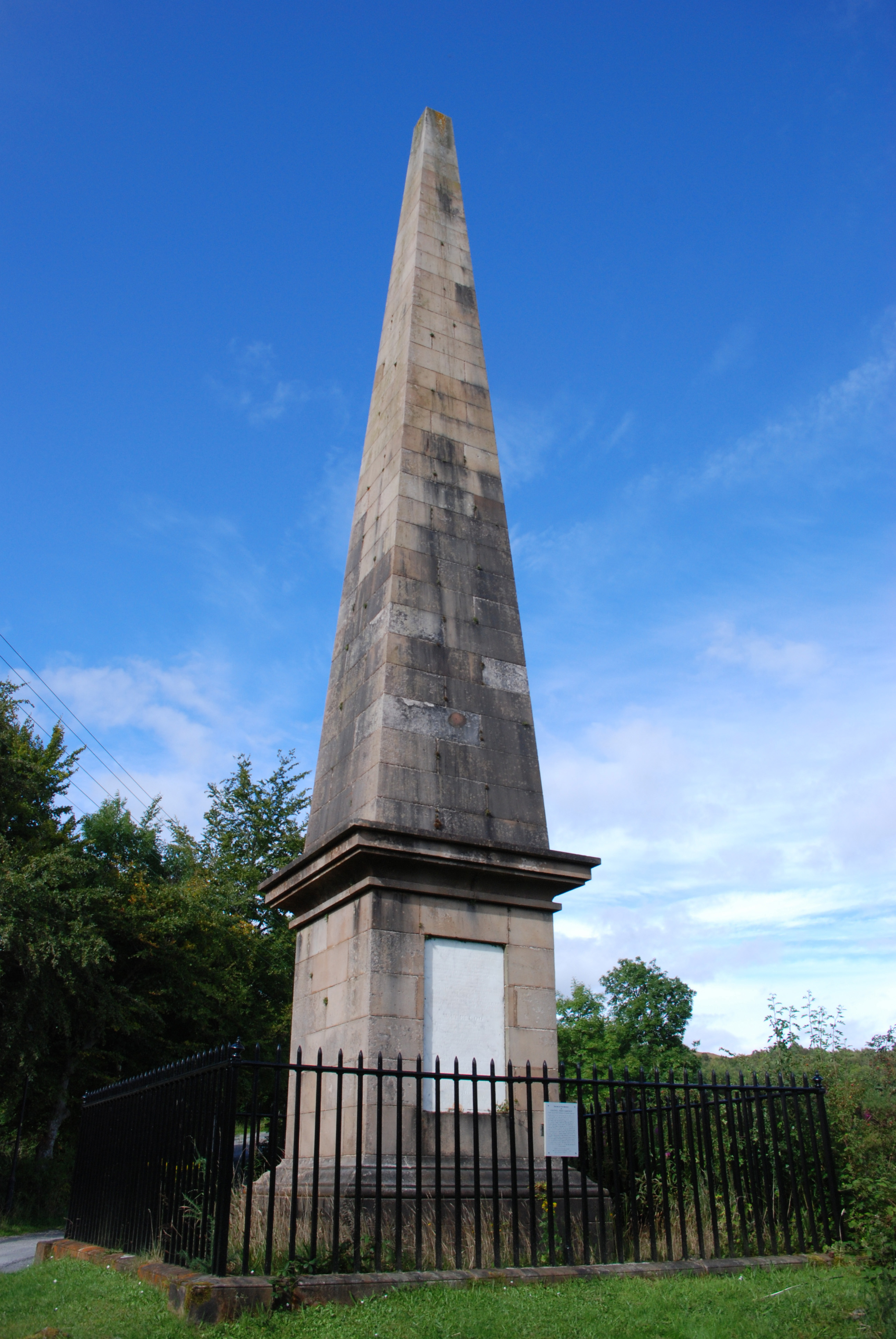
Memorial to Col John Cameron of Fassiefern, near Kilmallie Kirk, Corpach

During the Waterloo Campaign, Cameron's 92nd Foot alongside the 42nd Highlanders, 1st Royals, and 44th East Essex, formed General Pack's 9th Brigade of Sir Thomas Picton's 5th Division, and were among the first troops to march out of Brussels at daybreak on 16 June 1815. On that day, when leading his regiment in an attack on an enemy stronghold on the road to Charleroi near the village of Quatre-Bras, Cameron was mortally wounded. He died the following morning and was buried there at the side of the road to Ghent road, during the great storm of the 17th by his foster brother and faithful attendant, Private Ewen McMillan, (who had followed his fortunes from the first day he joined the Army), James Gordon, Regimental-Paymaster and a close personal friend, and a few soldiers of the regiment whose wounds prevented them engaging in combat on that day. Harold Chisholm played an important part on the day that John Cameron was shot: From the Inverness Courier. Death of a veteran. An old Peninsular soldier, Harold Chisholm of the 92nd Foot, died here last week. Chisholm loved to talk of the bravery of Colonel Cameron of the 92nd, and he assisted in carrying him off the field when fatally wounded at Quatre Bras. On returning from the melancholy task, the party met the Duke of Wellington, and Chisholm conducted the Duke to the house in the village of Quatre Bras where Colonel Cameron lay. The Duke, he said, "was much affected and remained some minutes with the dying officer". Chisholm was known to Wellington because he had saved his life that day. There is also a report in the Dublin University magazine vol 43, page 540, concerning the battle of Quatre Bras. " Private Harold Chisholm unfixed his bayonet and fired at the chasseurs". At the request of his family, Cameron's remains were disinterred soon afterwards, brought home in a man-of-war and, in the presence of a gathering of three thousand highlanders from the then still populous district of Lochaber, were laid to rest in Kilmallie churchyard where an obelisk inscribed with a quotation by Sir Walter Scott marks the site of his grave. (Note: In 1858, a memoir of Cameron was compiled from family sources by the Revd Archibald Clerk LLD, Minister of Kilmallie, two editions of which were privately printed in Glasgow. In addition to many interesting details, which testify to the keen personal interest taken by Cameron in his highland soldiers and to his kindly nature, the work contains a well-executed lithographic portrait of him in regimental full dress, wearing the insignia of the Order of the Tower and Sword, with other decorations, after an engraved portrait taken just before his death, and published by C. Turner, London, 1815 (Clerk 1858; Chichester 1886, p. 298).)

== Family baronetcy ==
In 1817 a baronetcy was created for Ewen Cameron of Fassiefern, as posthumous recognition of his late son's distinguished military service.

Sir Ewen Cameron died in 1828 at the age of ninety, when Cameron's younger brother succeeded as Sir Duncan Cameron, 2nd and last baronet. The Cameron baronetcy of Fassiefern became extinct in 1863.

== Coat of arms ==
Coat of arms of John Cameron of Fassiefern.

Notes
By matriculation with Lord Lyon King of Arms suitably cadenced
Crest
A Sheaf of five Arrows Proper tied with a Band Gules
Helm
A Gentleman's helm
Escutcheon
Gules three Bars Or
Motto
Aonaibh Ri Chéile (Eng: Unite)
(above the Crest)
Orders
Circlet of the Order of St Michael and St George
Other elements
Cameron tartan
Symbolism
Gules three Bars Or on a Bend Ermine a Sphinx between two Wreaths of Laurel Proper and on a Chief embattled a View of a Fortified Town inscribed thereunder Acre (augmentations of honour granted to Cameron by King George III).

== See also ==
- Cameron baronets
- Clan Cameron
- Highlanders (Seaforth, Gordons and Camerons)
