= Cameron baronets of Fassiefern (1817) =

The Cameron baronetcy, of Fassiefern and Callart in the County of Argyll and of Arthurstone in the County of Angus, was gazetted in 1815, but not created until 8 March 1817, for Sir Ewen Cameron whose son was John Cameron of Fassiefern (1771–1815); it was in recognition of John's military service as Colonel of the Gordon Highlanders, and his death in action at the Battle of Quatre-Bras, that the baronetcy was created.

== Cameron baronets, of Fassiefern (1817) ==
- Sir Ewen Cameron, 1st Baronet (1740–1828)
- Sir Duncan Cameron, 2nd Baronet (1775–1863)

Baronetage of the United Kingdom
Preceded by Elphinstone baronets	Cameron baronets of Fassiefern; 8 March 1817	Succeeded by McMahon baronets
