= Edward St John Jackson =

British colonial judge and administrator (1886–1961)

Sir Edward St John Jackson KCMG KBE QC

10th Chief Justice of Cyprus
- In office 19 May 1943 – 1952
- Preceded by: Sir Bernard Arthur Crean
- Succeeded by: Sir Eric Hallman

24th Lieutenant Governor of Malta
- In office 1940–1943
- Preceded by: John Adams Hunter
- Succeeded by: Sir David Campbell

Legal Secretary of Malta
- In office 1937–1940

23rd Attorney General of Ceylon
- In office 12 May 1929 – 1936
- Governor: Herbert Stanley; Bernard H. Bourdillion; Graeme Thomson; Francis Graeme Tyrrell; Edward Stubbs
- Preceded by: Lancelot Henry Elphinstone
- Succeeded by: John Curtois Howard

Personal details
- Born: 14 October 1886
- Died: 29 August 1961 (aged 74)
- Citizenship: British
- Relations: Sir Wilfrid Edward Francis Jackson (brother)
- Parent: Sir Henry Moore Jackson (father)
- Education: Stonyhurst College

Sir Edward St John Jackson, KCMG, KBE, QC (14 October 1886 – 29 August 1961) was a British colonial judge and administrator.

The son of Sir Henry Moore Jackson, and his wife, Emily (née Shea), Edward St John Jackson was raised in his mother's Roman Catholic faith. He was educated at Stonyhurst College and Beaumont College (both Jesuit schools) and at Brasenose College, Oxford, where he read law, graduating in 1908. He was called to the bar by the Inner Temple in 1910.

In 1912, he was appointed legal adviser to the Government of Gambia. In 1918, he was appointed Attorney General of the Nyasaland Protectorate, before being appointed to the High Court of the Nyasaland Protectorate in 1920. He was subsequently Attorney General of Tanganyika Territory between 1924 and 1929. He was the 23rd Attorney General of Ceylon.

He was appointed on 12 May 1929, succeeding Lancelot Henry Elphinstone, and held the office until 1936. He was succeeded by John Curtois Howard.

Between 1937 and 1940, Jackson was Legal Secretary to the Government of Malta, and he was the Colony's Lieutenant Governor between 1940 and 1943. From 1943 to 1951 he was Chief Justice of Cyprus. In 1953 he served as judge, then Chief Judge, to the Supreme Court of the British Zone of Occupation in Germany. He also served on various government boards in relation to Germany.

Jackson was appointed King's Counsel (Ceylon) in 1929. He was made a knight bachelor in 1933, a KBE in 1941 (having previously been appointed an OBE in 1918), and KCMG in 1943.

Legal offices
Preceded by Lancelot Henry Elphinstone	Attorney General of Ceylon; 1929–1936	Succeeded by John Curtois Howard
