= Walter Douglas Phillips Patton-Bethune =

British Army general and landowner

General Walter Douglas Phillips Patton-Bethune
- Born: 1821; Bishop's Hull, Taunton, Somerset, England
- Died: 28 January 1901 (aged 79–80)
- Spouse: Julia Elphinstone (m. 1855)
- Children: 5
- Relatives: Howard Elphinstone (father-in-law)
- Military career
- Branch: British Army
- Rank: General
- Unit: 47th Regiment of Foot
- Commands: 7th Regiment of Foot; Highland Light Infantry 2nd Battalion
- Conflicts: Eighth Kaffir War; Crimean War
- Awards: Order of the Medjidie

General Walter Douglas Phillips Patton-Bethune (1821–1901) was a British soldier and landowner.

== Life ==
Born in 1821 at Bishops Hull House, Bishop's Hull, Taunton, Somerset, he was the eldest son of Thomas Patton (1792–1876), a Captain in the Royal Navy who became a Somerset landowner, and his wife Matilda Winsloe. One of his great-grandmothers was Mary Bethune, who had married Colonel Henry Patton. Thomas and Matilda had nine children while living in Bishop's Hull.

Entering the British Army in 1838, he became an ensign by purchase in the 47th (Lancashire) Regiment of Foot. He served with this regiment in Malta and the West Indies, moving in 1846 as a Captain to the 74th (Highland) Regiment of Foot, with whom he served in all operations of the Eighth Kaffir War, commanding the Regiment from November 1851 until October 1852.

As a brevet Lieutenant-Colonel, he fought in the Crimean War, being present at the Battle of Balaclava, the Battle of Inkerman, and the Siege of Sevastopol, and during the Battle of Alma was with the staff of Lord Raglan. For his services there he was awarded the Ottoman Order of the Medjidie.

After further duties in India, he went on half-pay in 1864 but enjoyed further promotions, culminating in 1877 with the rank of full general. He was colonel of 74th (Highland) Regiment of Foot from 1876 until their amalgamation with the 71st Foot in 1881, after which he was colonel of the 2nd Battalion of the resultant Highland Light Infantry until his death.

Around 1873, he inherited the mansion and estate of Clayton Priory in Sussex; and in 1882, he received royal permission to add the surname of Bethune after that of Patton.

Patton-Bethune died on 28 January 1901 at Clayton Priory. His will was proved in London on 24 August 1903, showing effects of £12,000 (equivalent to £1,300,000 in 2025).

== Family ==
On 23 April 1855, in the British Embassy in Paris, he married Julia Elphinstone (1835–1909), daughter of Sir Howard Elphinstone, 2nd Baronet, and his wife Elizabeth Julia Curteis. They had five children.
