= Lancelot Elphinstone =

Lancelot Henry Elphinstone

22nd Attorney General of Ceylon
- In office 6 October 1924 – 1929
- Governor: William Manning
- Preceded by: Henry Gollan
- Succeeded by: Edward St. John Jackson

Personal details
- Born: 2 September 1879
- Died: 11 October 1965 (aged 86)
- Parent: Howard Elphinstone (father)
- Education: Trinity College, Cambridge

Sir Lancelot Henry Elphinstone (2 September 1879 – 11 October 1965) was the 22nd Attorney General of Ceylon.

The son of Sir Howard Elphinstone, 3rd Baronet and Husband of Jane E Jamieson. Elphinstone was educated at Eton and Trinity College, Cambridge. He was appointed Attorney General of British Honduras in 1913, Solicitor General of Trinidad in 1919, and Attorney General of Tanganyika Territory in 1921. He was appointed Attorney General of Ceylon on 6 October 1924, succeeding Henry Gollan, and held the office until 1929. He was succeeded by Edward St. John Jackson.

From 1929 to 1932 he was the Chief Judge of the Federated Malay States. He was knighted in the 1931 New Year Honours.

Legal offices
Preceded by Henry Gollan	Attorney General of Ceylon; 1924–1929	Succeeded by Edward St. John Jackson
