= Elphinstone Engineering =

- Industry: Transport engineering
- Founded: 1976
- Founder: Graeme Elphinstone
- Headquarters: Triabunna, Tasmania, Australia
- Key people: Graeme Elphinstone; Grant Elphinstone
- Products: Truck weighing systems, specialised trailers
- Website: www.elph.com.au

Elphinstone Engineering is an Australian company which manufactures specialised trailers for the transport industry and equipment for weighing trucks, including on-board scales that weigh the load. It focuses particularly on support for forestry. It has facilities at Triabunna in Tasmania and Sunshine West in Victoria. The company was founded by Graeme Elphinstone in 1976. Graeme Elphinstone's brother Dale owns a similarly named company based in Burnie.

Elphinstone produces skeleton trailers and B-doubles for the timber industry that fold up for easier transport when empty, and that can weigh the load.
