= David Elphinstone =

Australian architect

David Elphinstone (15 January 1846– 9 May 1916) was an Australian architect and builder. Elphinstone built many buildings in Glebe, New South Wales and Ashfield, New South Wales at the end of the 19th century.

== Biography ==
A member of a family of architects and builders, David Elphinstone was the son of William and Janet (née Leckie) Elphinstone.

Elphinstone joined the building industry in 1868 as a carpenter under the tutelage of his father. He was first listed as a builder in Glebe in 1873 and served as a local alderman from 1881 to 1886.

By 1879, he had become an architect and builder. His development of the Saint Philip's Church lands in Glebe made him Glebe's largest building contractor.

His son, David Bruce Elphinstone (born 1880), also became an architect.
