= Charles O'Brien (colonial administrator) =

British Army officer and colonial administrator

Lieutenant-Colonel Sir Charles O'Brien KCMG
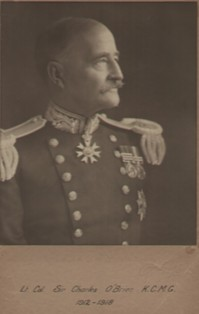
- Born: Charles Richard Mackey O'Brien; 13 December 1859
- Died: 29 December 1935 (aged 76)
- Education: Felsted School, Royal Military College, Sandhurst
- Occupations: British Army Officer, Colonial Administrator
- Known for: Colonial Administrator in Gambia, Seychelles, Barbados, Sierra Leone
- Awards: Companion and Knight Commander of the Order of St Michael and St George

Lieutenant-Colonel Sir Charles Richard Mackey O'Brien KCMG (13 December 1859 – 29 November 1935) was a British Army officer and colonial administrator.

O'Brien was the youngest son of Sir Terence O'Brien, Governor of Heligoland and afterwards of Newfoundland. He was educated at Felsted School and the Royal Military College, Sandhurst, from which he was commissioned into the 30th Regiment of Foot (later the East Lancashire Regiment) in May 1878.

On 3 September 1878, in company with five other ensigns of his regiment, he was returning from Gravesend to Woolwich following musketry training, but they missed their ferry, the SS Princess Alice, by seconds. In Gallion's Reach the Princess Alice collided with the steamer SS Bywell Castle and sank with the loss of nearly 700 of her 800 passengers, one of the worst maritime disasters in British history. All six ensigns later went on to become distinguished senior officers and held occasional reunion dinners to commemorate their luck that day.

O'Brien was promoted lieutenant in September 1880, captain in May 1887, and major in October 1897. From April 1886 to January 1890 he served as adjutant of the Moulmein Volunteer Rifle Corps in Burma and from April 1894 to 1899 he was adjutant of the 1st Royal Guernsey Light Infantry (Militia). He served with the 1st Battalion, East Lancashire Regiment in the Second Boer War, seeing considerable combat and later being appointed president of the military tribunal in Johannesburg, for which he was twice mentioned in dispatches. He then served as Deputy Commissioner of the Transvaal Town Police from 1901 to 1908, during which time he frequently acted as Commissioner. He was promoted brevet lieutenant-colonel in the South African honours list published on 26 June 1902, and retired from the Army in March 1903.

In 1910 he was appointed Colonial Secretary of the Gambia, often acting as governor. In October 1912 he was appointed Governor of the Seychelles and in April 1918 Governor of Barbados. He retired in September 1925, but from May to July 1926 he served as Special Government Commissioner in Sierra Leone and on the Colonial Films Committee from 1929 to 1930.

O'Brien was appointed Companion of the Order of St Michael and St George (CMG) in 1908 and Knight Commander of the Order of St Michael and St George (KCMG) in the 1920 New Year Honours.

O′Brien married at the Anglican Cathedral in Bloemfontein on 26 December 1902 Selina Beatrice Elphinstone, fourth daughter of Sir Howard Elphinstone, 3rd Baronet.

== Footnotes ==
Government offices
Preceded by Walter E. Davidson	Governor of the Seychelles; 1912–1918	Succeeded by Eustace Fiennes
