= Cameron baronets =

There have been two baronetcies created for persons named Cameron, both in the baronetage of the United Kingdom. Both titles are extinct.

- Cameron baronets of Fassiefern (1817)
- Cameron baronets of Balclutha (1893)
