= Sir Howard Elphinstone, 1st Baronet =

British Royal Engineers commander (1773–1846)

Major-General Sir Howard Elphinstone Bt CB
- Born: 4 March 1773
- Died: 28 April 1846 (aged 73); Ore, Sussex, England
- Spouse: Frances Warburton (m. 1803)
- Children: 4, including Howard
- Relatives: John Elphinstone (father); Howard Elphinstone (grandson); William Masters Smith (son-in-law)
- Military career
- Branch: Royal Engineers
- Rank: Major-General
- Conflicts: French Revolutionary Wars; Napoleonic Wars: Peninsular War
- Awards: Companion of the Order of the Bath

Major-General Sir Howard Elphinstone, 1st Baronet, CB (4 March 1773 – 28 April 1846) was a commander of the Royal Engineers in the Peninsular War.

Elphinstone was the youngest son of John Elphinstone, a captain in the Royal Navy and for a period a vice-admiral in the Russian Navy. His mother was Amelia, daughter of John Warburton.

== Military service ==
On 24 April 1793, Elphinstone was appointed a second lieutenant in the Royal Engineers. He was present for the expedition that took the Cape of Good Hope in 1795, and was promoted to lieutenant on 5 February 1796 and captain on 1 July 1800. Elphinstone commanded the engineers in Sir David Baird's Indian army sent to help expel the French from Egypt in 1801. Sent on a mission to Brazil in 1806, he was the commanding engineer at the Battle of Montevideo in 1807, under the overall command of John Whitelocke. He was posted to Portugal in 1808, commanding the Royal Engineers of the Peninsular army.

He saw his first service in the Peninsular War at the Battle of Roliça, where he was badly wounded and subsequently left the theatre. On 1 January 1812, he was breveted major and returned to the Peninsula, where he served until the end of the war. Promoted regimental lieutenant-colonel on 21 July 1813, after the battles of Nivelle and the Nive, Elphinstone commanded the engineers at the crossing of the Adour and the siege and battle of Bayonne.

After the war, the Peninsular commanders were honoured, and Elphinstone was no exception. He was created 1st Baronet of Elphinstone, of Sowerby in the County of Cumberland, in the Baronetage of the United Kingdom on 25 May 1816, and nominated a Companion of the Order of the Bath. He saw no further active service, but was promoted regimental colonel on 2 December 1824 and major-general on 10 January 1837.

== Family ==
Elphinstone married his first cousin Frances Warburton (daughter of John Warburton, junior, and niece of John Clater Aldridge) on 14 February 1803. They had one son and three daughters:

- Sir Howard Elphinstone, 2nd Baronet (1804–1893)
- Frances Elphinstone (d. 31 October 1905), married on 6 September 1836 to William Masters Smith
- Harriet Elphinstone (d. 13 February 1892), married on 25 April 1849 to Rev. William Twiss Turner
- Louisa Elphinstone (d. 3 October 1903), married first on 1 October 1832 to Robert Anstruther (1805–1856), of Thirdpark, married second on 15 August 1861 to Andrew Bonar

Elphinstone died at Ore Place, at Ore, Sussex (near Hastings) on 28 April 1846.

Baronetage of the United Kingdom
New creation	Baronet (of Sowerby); 1816–1846	Succeeded by Howard Elphinstone
