= Alan Sutherland (artist) =

Scottish artist (1931–2019)

- Born: Alan Gordon Dunnett Sutherland; 23 December 1931; Bombay, India
- Died: 27 June 2019 (aged 87)
- Citizenship: British
- Known for: Portrait Painting

Alan Sutherland (born 1931, in Bombay, India) was a Scottish artist based in Edinburgh. He died on 27 June 2019 at the age of 87.

== Early life ==
He was born in Bombay, India in 1931, and lived there for the first three years of his life. Shortly after his 3rd birthday, his parents moved back to Edinburgh where Alan spent his early years being educated at Loretto School in Musselburgh. He was only thirteen when he had his first picture accepted for the Society of Scottish Artists and by the age of twenty two he had three portraits exhibited in the Royal Scottish Academy. He graduated from Edinburgh College of Art in 1952.

== Career ==
Significant portrait sitters include Quentin Crisp, Lord Cameron, Sir Conolly Abel Smith, Sir Nicholas Fairbairn QC, Prince Philip, Duke of Edinburgh, Alec Douglas-Home, Angus Douglas-Hamilton, 15th Duke of Hamilton, Henry Thynne, 6th Marquess of Bath, and William Maxwell "Max" Aitken, 1st Baron Beaverbrook.

To mark the bicentennial in 1987 the New Club in Edinburgh, on recommendation from the Royal Society of Portrait Painters, commissioned Alan for a portrait of their Patron Prince Philip. The sittings took place in Holyrood Palace and the portrait of the Duke currently hangs in the New Club Morning Room.

Other notable works include the ceiling fresco at Invercreran House in Argyll, Scotland.

He has exhibited in The Royal Academy London, the Chelsea Society, the Society of Scottish Artists, the Paris Salon, the Royal Society of Portrait Painters, the Royal Scottish Academy, the Royal Glasgow Institute of the Fine Arts and Prouds Art Gallery Sydney.
