= Mount Elphinstone Provincial Park =

Provincial park in British Columbia

- IUCN category II (national park)
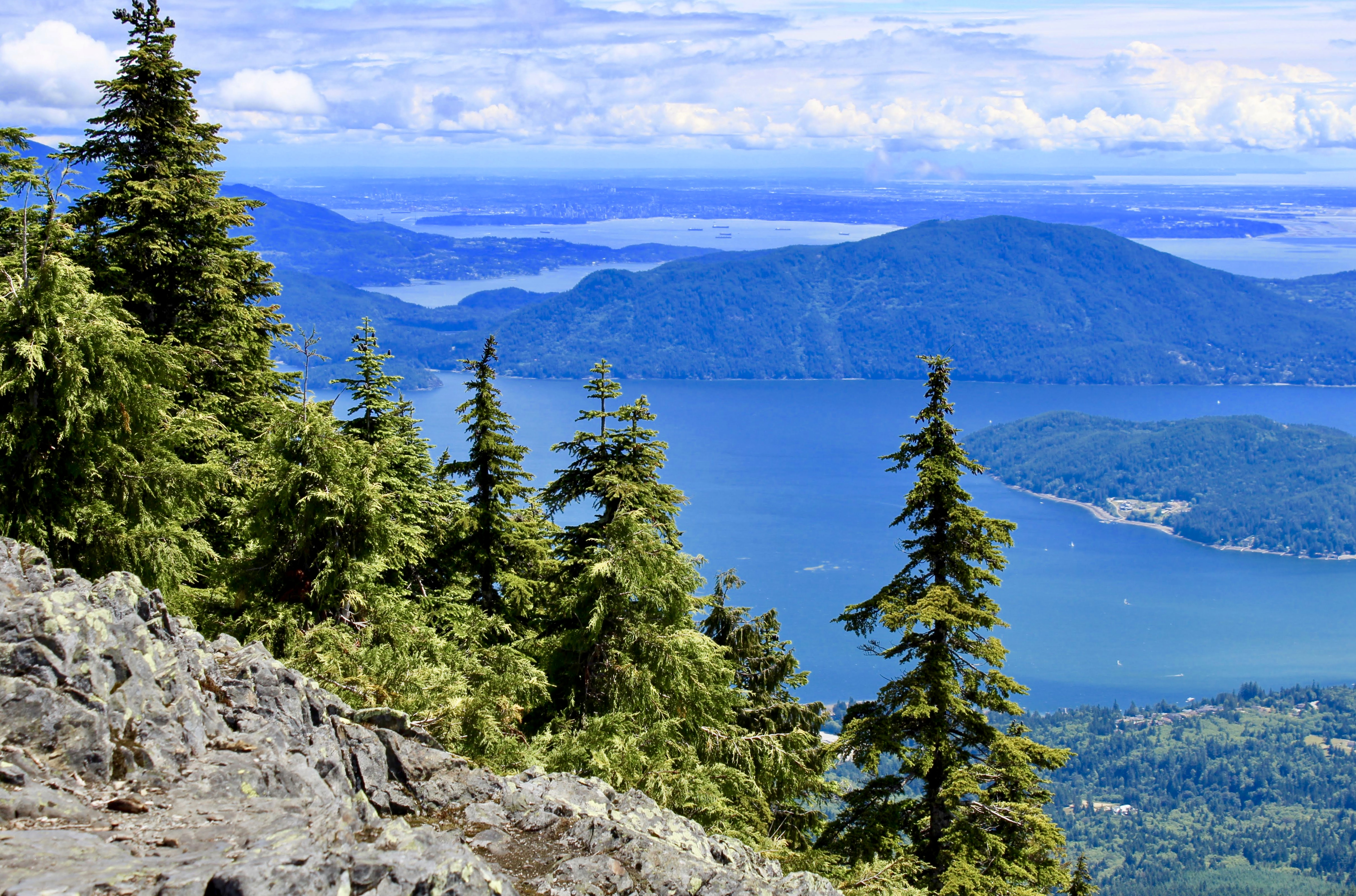
- Panoramic view

- Location within British Columbia
- Interactive map of Mount Elphinstone Provincial Park
- Location: British Columbia, Canada
- Nearest city: Sechelt
- Coordinates: 49°25′56″N 123°36′44″W
- Area: 1.41 km^{2} (0.54 sq mi)
- Established: June 29, 2000
- Governing body: BC Parks

Mount Elphinstone Provincial Park is a provincial park located near BC Highway 101, in British Columbia, Canada. Located near Mount Elphinstone, the park is on the west side of Howe Sound and north of the town of Gibsons and near the community of Roberts Creek. Created in 2000, the park is approximately 141 hectares in size.

== See also ==
- List of British Columbia provincial parks
