= Sir Howard Elphinstone, 2nd Baronet =

British Whig politician (1804-1893)

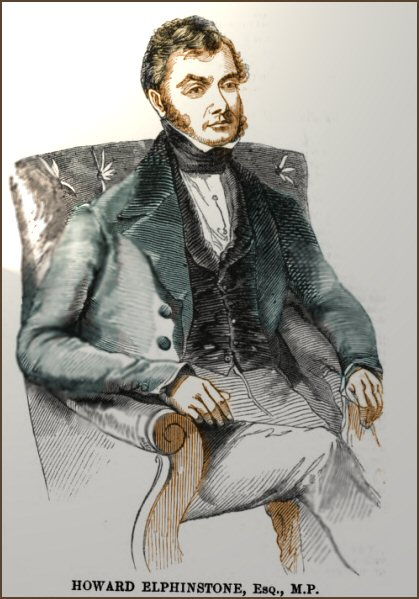
- Elphinstone in 1843, Illustrated London News

Member of Parliament for Lewes
- In office 1841-1847

Member of Parliament for Hastings
- In office 1835-1837

Personal details
- Born: 9 June 1804
- Died: 16 March 1893 (aged 88)
- Party: Whig
- Spouse: Elizabeth Curteis (m. 1829)
- Children: 2, including Howard
- Parent: Sir Howard Elphinstone (father)
- Relatives: Walter Patton-Bethune (son-in-law)

Sir Howard Elphinstone, 2nd Baronet (9 June 1804 – 16 March 1893) was a British Whig politician.

== Education and career ==
Born in Plymouth, Elphinstone was educated at the High School of Edinburgh and Trinity College, Cambridge, where he graduated BA in 1826. He was elected as member of parliament (MP) for Hastings at the 1835 general election, having unsuccessfully contested the seat in 1832. He did not stand for re-election in Hastings at the 1837 general election, but stood instead in Liverpool, where he did not win a seat. He returned to the House of Commons at the 1841 general election, when he won one of the two seats in Lewes. He did not stand again in 1847.

He was elected a Fellow of the Royal Society in June 1832.

== Family ==
Elphinstone was the son of Lt.-Gen. Sir Howard Elphinstone, 1st Baronet (1773–1846) and Frances Warburton (died 1858). He was a barrister, and had the degrees of MA and Doctor of Civil Law (D.C.L.). He married Elizabeth Julia Curteis, in 1829, and they had two children.

He succeeded to his father's baronetcy in 1846, and on his death was succeeded by his son Howard Warburton Elphinstone (1830–1917).

Parliament of the United Kingdom
Preceded by John Ashley Warre; Frederick North	Member of Parliament for Hastings; 1835 – 1837; With: Frederick North	Succeeded by Joseph Planta; Robert Hollond
Preceded by Viscount Cantelupe; Henry Fitzroy	Member of Parliament for Lewes; 1841 – 1847; With: Summers Harford to 1842; Henry Fitzroy from 1842	Succeeded by Robert Perfect; Henry Fitzroy
Baronetage of the United Kingdom
Preceded by Howard Elphinstone	Baronet (of Sowerby); 1846–1893	Succeeded by Howard Elphinstone
