= William Beardmore (cricketer) =

Scottish cricketer and soldier

Personal information
- Full name: William Joseph Montague Beardmore
- Born: 18 July 1894; Renfrew, Renfrewshire, Scotland
- Died: 29 December 1978 (aged 84); Haywards Heath, Sussex, England
- Batting: Right-handed

Domestic team information
- Years: Team
- 1938–1952: Scotland

Career statistics
Competition	First-class
Matches	1
Runs scored	5
Batting average	2.50
100s/50s	–/–
Top score	3
Catches/stumpings	–/–
- Source: Cricinfo, 9 July 2022

William Joseph Montague Beardmore (18 July 1894 – 29 December 1978) was a Scottish first-class cricketer and British Army officer.

Beardmore was born in July 1894 at Renfrew. He was educated at the Loretto School, before matriculating to Clare College, Cambridge. Beardmore served in the First World War and was commissioned into the Gordon Highlanders as a second lieutenant in January 1915. He was promoted to lieutenant in March 1916, before being promoted to captain in June 1917. He was wounded in action during the war.

A club cricketer for the West of Scotland Cricket Club, Beardmore made a single appearance in first-class cricket for Scotland against the touring South Africans at Glasgow in 1924. Batting twice in the match, he was dismissed for 2 runs by Cec Dixon in the Scotland first innings, while in their second innings he was dismissed for 3 runs by the same bowler. He later moved to London, where he was the manager of the London arm of William Beardmore and Company. Beardmore died at Haywards Heath in December 1978.
