= Loretto School =

School in Musselburgh, East Lothian, Scotland

Location
- Linkfield Road; Musselburgh, East Lothian, EH21 7AF; Scotland

Information
- Type: Public school Private School; Boarding school Day School
- Established: 1827; 199 years ago
- Founder: Thomas Langhorne
- Headmaster: Peter Richardson
- Staff: c. 200
- Gender: co-educational
- Age: 3 to 18
- Enrolment: c. 500
- Houses: School, Pinkie, Hope, Seton, Balcarres, Holm, Eleanora Almond
- Colours: Langhorne, Tristram, Greenlees, Mackintosh.
- Publication: The Lorettonian
- Alumni: Old Lorettonians
- Website: www.lorettoschool.co.uk

Loretto School, founded in 1827, is a private boarding and day school for boys and girls aged 3 to 18. The campus occupies 85 acres (34 hectares) in Musselburgh, East Lothian, Scotland.

== History ==
The school was founded by the Reverend Thomas Langhorne in 1827. Langhorne came from Crosby Ravensworth in Westmorland. He named the school for Loretto House, his then home, which was itself named for a medieval chapel dedicated to Our Lady of Loreto, which had formerly stood on the site of the school. The school was later taken over by his son, also named Thomas Langhorne. The last link with the Langhorne family was Thomas' son John, who was a master at Loretto from 1890 to 1897, and later headmaster at John Watson's Institution. Loretto was later under the headmastership of Dr. Hely Hutchinson Almond from 1862 to 1903.

In the 1950s the school increased the accommodation in science laboratories, established arts as a part of the curriculum and introduced the chapel service as part of the daily school life.

The school originally accepted only boys, but in 1981 girls joined the sixth form and in 1995 the third form, so making the school fully co-educational by 1997.

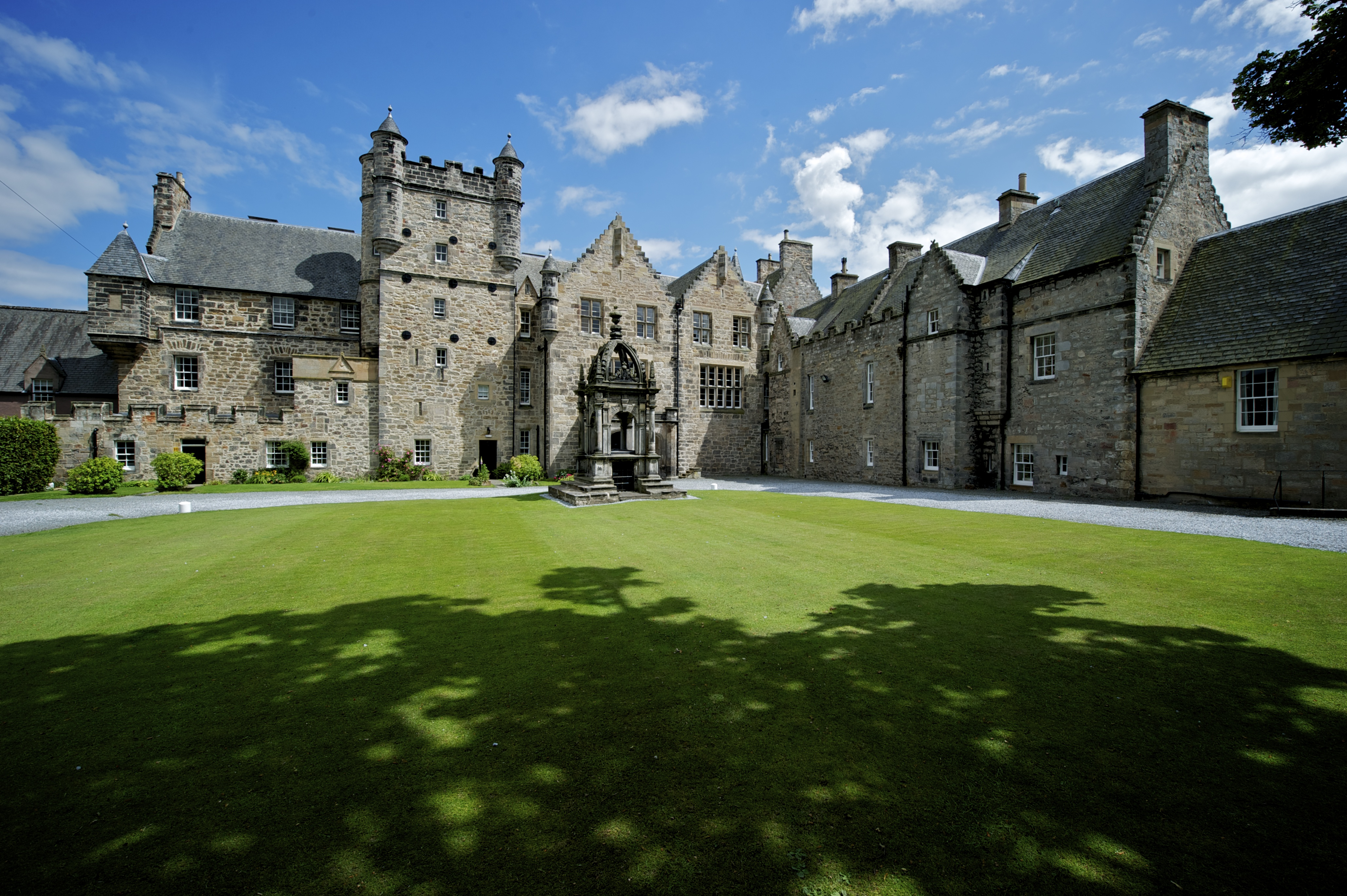
Loretto school's Pinkie House, built in the Scots baronial style

In 2001 the film director Don Boyd published an article in The Observer detailing his systematic sexual abuse by a teacher in the school in the 1960s. The revelation led to further allegations about the teacher from other former pupils and subsequent calls for the teacher's prosecution. The teacher, then 79 years old, was charged, but the case was dropped on the grounds of his ill health. The teacher later died. In 2017, it was announced that the school would be investigated as part of Lady Smith's inquiry into child sexual abuse.

In 2021, Boyd told the Scottish Child Abuse Inquiry that the late Guy Ray-Hills, a French teacher at Loretto, raped him in 1958 when Boyd was 10 years old. Loretto School admitted to the Inquiry that pupils had been abused by one of its teachers in the 1950s and 1960s. Angus Bell, a former pupil, gave evidence and later sued the school for £1 million for extensive sexual, emotional and physical abuse suffered in the 1990s mostly at the hands of older pupils under the "fagging" system. David Stock, a teacher, also gave evidence and said he informed the Loretto school authorities of the abuse but was targeted, forced to resign and sign a non-disclosure agreement. The Inquiry, which spanned a period from 1945 to 2021, published its findings in April 2023, upon which Loretto offered an unreserved apology and deep regret for abuse experienced by children under its care, at both the junior and senior schools.

In 2010 the school was sued by an employee for sex discrimination: the employee felt she had been treated unfavourably following the announcement of her pregnancy. Judge Stewart Watt rejected the sexual discrimination claim asserting that 'there appears to have been no ulterior motive to make [the employee] redundant during the review of the department; the only motive was to try to better organise the school', but he stated that the school had breached maternity regulations. The claimant was awarded £8,000 for loss of earnings and emotional stress.

In 2013, Loretto School was informed by the Scottish Charity Regulator that it did not qualify for charitable status for failing to provide sufficient public benefit. Subsequently, the school modified its means-tested bursary provision and has remained a registered charity ever since.

Former Scotland rugby captain Jason White took his first steps into teaching with a role at the school in September 2017. In the same month it was announced that Jacob Slater, 15, a pupil at the school, would appear in the American-Scottish historical action drama Outlaw King about Robert the Bruce and the Wars of Scottish Independence.

Jamie Parker, former Loretto School pupil and Royal Academy of Dramatic Art student, was named Best Actor at the Olivier Awards in April 2017 for his performance as Harry Potter.

In September 2018, the employment of a teacher at the school, who had been accused of inappropriate behaviour towards students, was terminated.

Loretto School was listed as the fourth-highest Scottish independent school in the 2018 A level league tables.

== Facilities ==
Loretto School is set in an 85-acre (34-hectare) campus and is made up of two parts: the Junior School ("The Nippers") for children aged 3–12, and the Senior School for those aged 12–18.

== Loretto Golf Academy ==
The Loretto Golf Academy, established in 2002, offers golf to over 250 pupils using the local links courses and the School's new Indoor Golf Performance Centre.

== Heads of School ==
- 1825–1862 Langhorne family (Thomas, Thomas II, John)
- 1862–1903 Hely Hutchinson Almond
- 1903–1908 Henry Barrington Tristram
- 1908–1926 Allan Ramsey Smith
- 1926–1945 Dr James Robertson Campbell Greenlees
- 1945–1960 David Forbes Mackintosh
- 1960–1976 Rab Brougham Bruce Lockhart
- 1976–1984 David Bruce McMurray
- 1984–1995 The Rev. Norman Walker Drummond
- 1995–2000 Keith Joseph Budge
- 2001–2008 Michael Barclay Mavor
- 2008–2013 Peter A. Hogan
- 2013–2014 Elaine Logan (Acting Head)
- 2014–2024 Dr Graham Hawley
- 2024–present Peter Richardson

== Notable alumni ==
- Ralph Arnold – author and publisher
- Sir A. G. G. Asher – international cricketer and rugby player
- William Beardmore – cricketer
- Don Boyd – film director, producer, screenwriter, novelist
- Alexander Bruce, Lord Balfour of Burleigh – Unionist representative peer, Secretary for Scotland, Governor of the Bank of Scotland, Chancellor of the University of St Andrews, and leading figure in the Church of Scotland
- A. B. Carmichael – international rugby player
- Charles Walker Cathcart – international rugby player and surgeon
- Alexander Cary, Master of Falkland – nobleman and screenwriter
- Jim Clark – Formula One Champion (twice), Grand Prix winner and world champion
- Paul Clauss – international rugby player
- George Bertram Cockburn – pioneer aviator* Alistair Darling – former Labour Chancellor of the Exchequer
- Iain Conn – CEO Centrica
- Air Marshal Sir Patrick Dunn – Royal Air Force officer who served as Air Officer Commanding-in-Chief of Flying Training Command
- Fergus Ewing – SNP politician
- Sir Nicholas Fairbairn – Conservative politician, former Solicitor General for Scotland
- Sir Denis Forman – Chair of the British Film Institute; Chairman and Managing Director of Granada Television
- Peter Fraser, Baron Fraser of Carmyllie – Conservative politician, former Solicitor General for Scotland
- Keith Geddes – Scottish Rugby Union player who fought in the Battle of Britain
- Stephen Gilbert (1912–2010) – Northern Irish novelist
- Major George Howson – founder of the Royal British Legion Poppy Factory
- Alan Johnston, Lord Johnston – Senator of the College of Justice
- William Alexander Kerr – Victoria Cross recipient
- William Laidlay – Scottish artist, barrister and cricketer
- Hector Laing, Baron Laing of Dunphail – businessman and peer
- Norman Lamont, Baron Lamont of Lerwick – former Conservative Chancellor of the Exchequer
- Hew Lorimer – sculptor
- Donald Mackenzie Scottish judge, styled Lord Mackenzie
- Andrew Marr – journalist
- Edward Powys Mathers – translator, poet, and pioneer cryptic crossword setter
- James Broom Millar – first Director General of the Ghana Broadcasting Corporation (1954–1960)
- James, Duke of Montrose – nobleman
- Robin Orr – composer
- Jamie Parker – actor and singer
- Sir Robert Pearson – cricketer, advocate and chairman of the London Stock Exchange
- Hugo Rifkind – columnist
- Calum Semple – epidemiologist
- Rev. Henry Holmes Stewart (1847–1937) FA Cup winner in 1873
- Rob Strachan – Commander of Clan Strachan
- David Strang – former Chief Constable of Lothian and Borders, and Chief Inspector of Scottish Prisons
- Alan Sutherland – artist

== Motto ==
The motto of the school, Spartam nactus es, hanc exorna, means literally "You have obtained Sparta: embellish it". The Latin is a mistranslation by Erasmus of a line from a Greek play, Telephus by Euripides. The words have been interpreted as meaning "You were born with talents: develop them" or "Develop whatever talents you have inherited".

In the late 18th century, the words were quoted by Edmund Burke in his pamphlet, Reflections on the Revolution in France:

"There is something else than the mere alternative of absolute destruction, or unreformed existence. Spartam nactus es; hanc exorna. This is, in my opinion, a rule of profound sense, and ought never to depart from the mind of an honest reformer. I cannot conceive how any man can have brought himself to that pitch of presumption, to consider his country as nothing but carte blanche, upon which he may scribble whatever he pleases ... a good patriot, and a true politician, always considers how he shall make the most of the existing materials of his country. A disposition to preserve, and an ability to improve, taken together, would be my standard of a statesman.

== Sources ==
- Marshall, Howard; Jordon, J.P. (1951). Oxford v Cambridge, The Story of the University Rugby Match. London: Clerke & Cockeran.

== Gallery ==
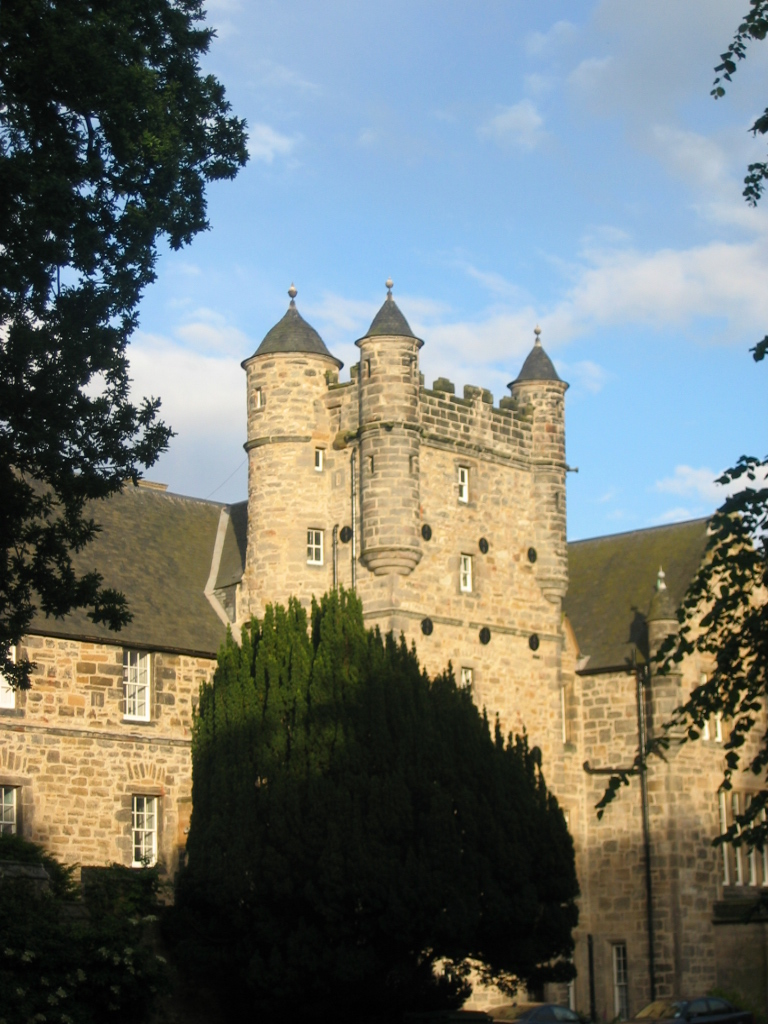
Pinkie House

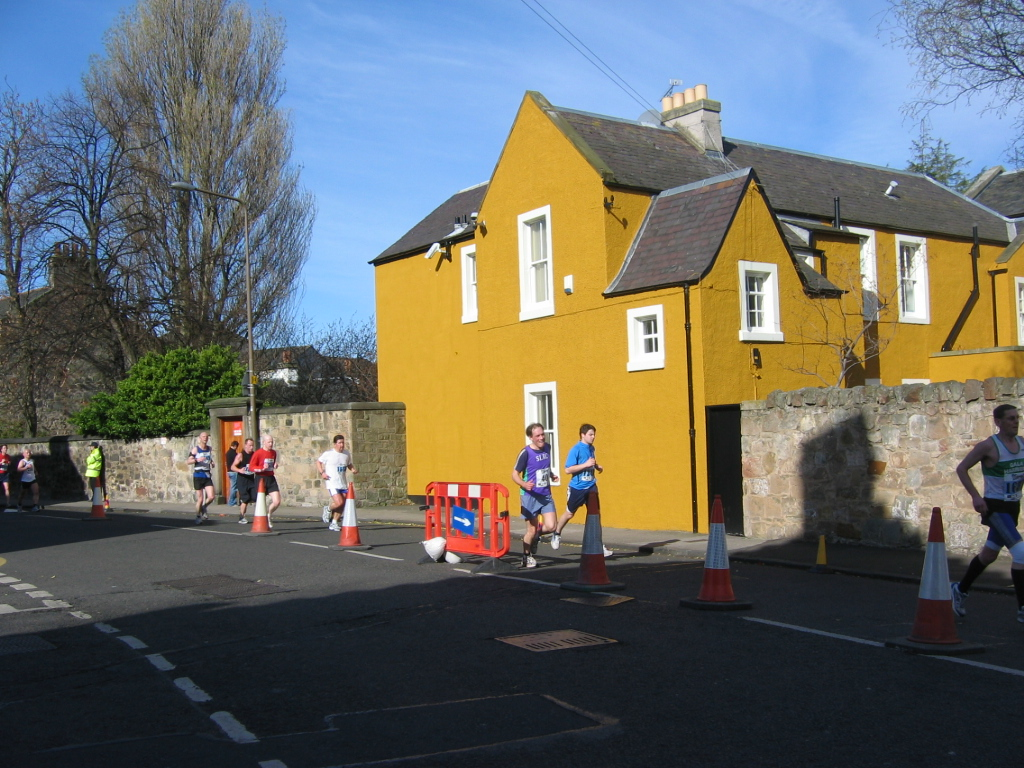
Balcarres House and Holm House

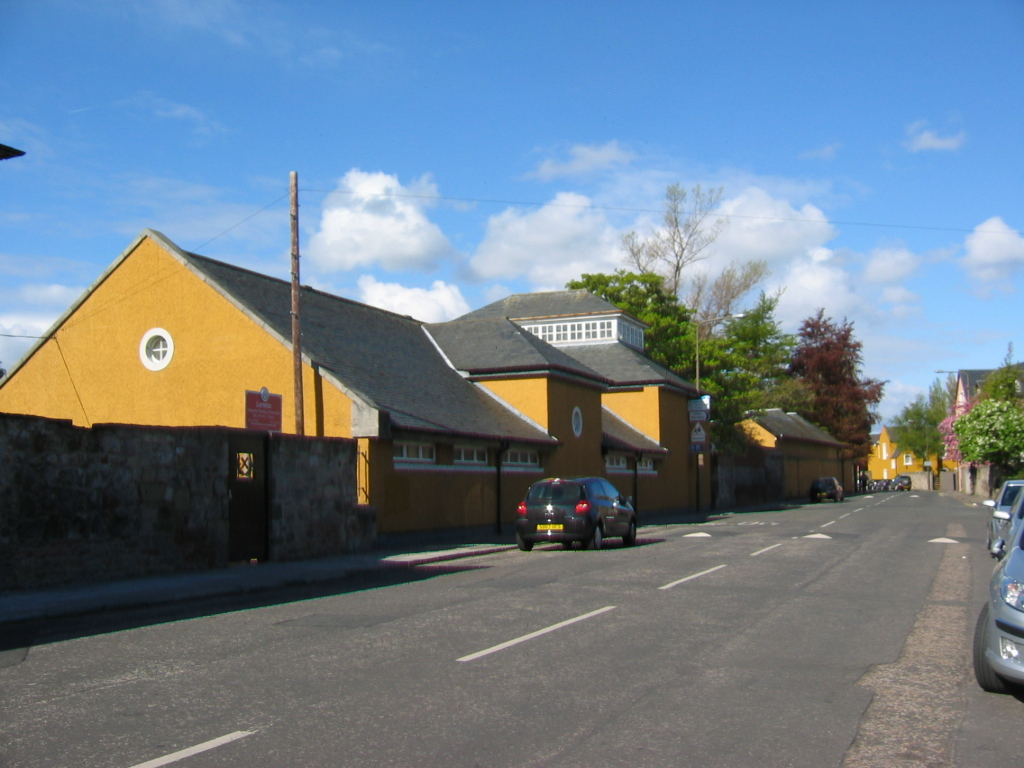
Millhill entrance at Loretto
