= James Elphinston =

British linguist

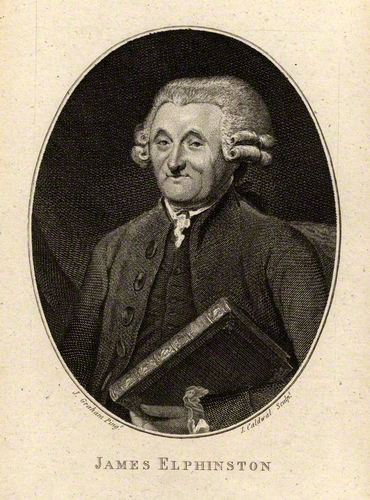
James Elphinston

James Elphinston (December 6, 1721 – October 8, 1809) was a well noted 18th-century Scottish educator, orthographer, phonologist and linguistics expert.

== Life ==
Elphinston was a good friend of Samuel Johnson as stated in Life of Samuel Johnson, LL.D. (1904, Oxford edition), Chapter IV [1750], and tutor of Alexander James Dallas.

"Mr. James Elphinston, who has since published various works, and who was ever esteemed by Johnson as a worthy man, happened to be in Scotland while the Rambler was coming out in single papers at London. With a laudable zeal at once for the improvement of his countrymen, and the reputation of his friend, he suggested and took the charge of an edition of those Essays at Edinburgh, which followed progressively the London publication."

Thirty-six of Elphinston's translations of mottoes appear in Johnson's Rambler, as part of a revised, corrected edition in July 1752 and subsequently. Johnson's affection for Elphinston is evident from a letter from early 1752 in which he wrote, "I beg of You to write soon, and to write often, and to write long letters, which I hope in time to repay you, but you must be a patient Creditor".

In 1792, Elphinston moved to live in Elstree and finally to Hammersmith in 1806, where he died in 1809. Robert Charles Dallas was Elphinston's biographer in the 1809 edition of Gentleman's Magazine no. 79.

His translation of the Roman poet Martial has been criticised for its bowlderization and perceived low poetic value, for example Robert Burns wrote a critical poem describing "laurell'd Martial calling Murther!" upon seeing the Elphinston translation.

== Bibliography ==
- Propriety Ascertained in Her Picture, (or English Speech and Spelling Rendered Mutual Guides, Secure Alike from Distant, and from Domestic, Error)(1786, 1787) [2 volumes]
- The Principles of the English Language Digested for the use of Schools (1766)
- Inglish Orthography Epittomized (1790)
- Miniature of English Orthography (1795)

Co-author of:

- The Epigrams of Marcus Valerius Martialis in twelve books: with commentary and translation into English by James Elphinston (1782)
