= Elphinstone baronets of Logie (1701) =

The Elphinstone baronetcy, of Logie in the County of Aberdeen, was created in the Baronetage of Nova Scotia on 2 December 1701 for James Elphinstone, with remainder to heirs male whatsoever. The title became dormant on the death of the 4th Baronet in 1743.

In 1927 Alexander Logie Elphinstone, managed to claim the title as the 10th Baronet,.

== Elphinstone (Elphinston) baronets, of Logie (1701) ==
- Sir James Elphinstone, 1st Baronet (c. 1645–1722)
- Sir John Elphinstone, 2nd Baronet (1675–1732)
- Sir James Elphinstone, 3rd Baronet (c. 1710–1739)
- Sir John Elphinstone, 4th Baronet (c. 1717–1743) (dormant)
- Sir John Elphinstone, de jure 5th Baronet (1665–1758)
- Sir Alexander Elphinstone, de jure 6th Baronet (died 1795)
- Sir John Elphinstone, de jure 7th Baronet (1771–1835)
- Sir Alexander Elphinstone, de jure 8th Baronet (1801–1888)
- Sir John Elphinstone, de jure 9th Baronet (1834–1893)
- Sir Alexander Logie Elphinstone, 10th Baronet (1880–1970) (claimed title 1927)
- Sir John Elphinston, 11th Baronet (1924–2015)
- Sir Alexander Elphinston, 12th Baronet (born 1955)

The heir apparent to the baronetcy is the 12th baronet's eldest son, Daniel John Elphinston (born 1989).
