= Sir Howard Elphinstone, 3rd Baronet =

British baronet and academic

Sir Howard Elphinstone Bt.
- Born: 26 July 1830; Westminster, London, England
- Died: 3 January 1917 (aged 86); Wimbledon, London, England
- Education: Trinity College, Cambridge
- Occupations: Lawyer, educator
- Spouse: Constance Hankey (m. 1860)
- Children: 11, including Lancelot
- Father: Howard Elphinstone
- Relatives: Howard Elphinstone (grandfather); Charles O'Brien (son-in-law)

Sir Howard Warburton Elphinstone, 3rd Baronet (26 July 1830 – 3 January 1917) was an English barrister and legal academic.

== Biography ==
Born in Westminster, Elphinstone was the eldest son of Sir Howard Elphinstone, 2nd Baronet, and educated at Eton and Trinity College, Cambridge, where he took a scholarship. In his thirties, he was called to the Bar at Lincoln's Inn, later becoming a lecturer for the Law Society and then the Professor of Real Property Law to the Inns of Court. He died in Wimbledon Park.

== Family ==
On 4 August 1860 he married Constance Mary Alexander Hankey, third daughter of John Alexander Hankey. They had six sons and five daughters. He was succeeded in the baronetcy by his grandson, Howard Graham Elphinstone, the son of Graham Warburton Elphinstone, the 3rd baronet's second son:

- Howard John Elphinstone (1862–1895); who married in 1889 Katherine Curteis, and had issue.
- Graham Warburton Elphinstone (1866–1903); who served in Madras as part of the Indian Civil Service; he married in 1896 Susan Harley, daughter of H. C. R. Harley, of India, and had a son and a duaghter including Howard Graham Elphinstone, who succeeded his grandfather.
- Douglas Bonar Elphinstone (1871–1892).
- Rev. Maurice Curteis Elphinstone (1874–1969).
- Kenneth Vaughan Elphinstone (1878–1963), a colonial official.
- Sir Lancelot Henry Elphinstone (1879–1965).
- Constance Julia Elphinstone (1864–1958); who married in 1889 Captain John Russell Compton Domvile (d. 1893), and had issue.
- Frances Mary Elphinstone (1865–1946); who married in 1891 Edward Alfred Chandler, and had issue.
- Isabel Harriet Elphinstone (1868–1942)
- Selina Beatrice Elphinstone (1875–1965); who married at the Anglican Cathedral in Bloemfontein on 26 December 1902 Charles O'Brien, who was later Governor of Seychelles and knighted as a KCMG.
- Gladys Christine Elphinstone (1884–1985).

Baronetage of the United Kingdom
Preceded by Howard Elphinstone	Baronet (of Sowerby); 1893–1917	Succeeded by Howard Graham Elphinstone
