= Elphinstone baronets =

Set index for Elphinstone baronets

There have been three baronetcies created for persons with the surname Elphinstone, two in the Baronetage of Nova Scotia and one in the Baronetage of the United Kingdom. As of 2026 two of the creations are extant.

- Elphinstone baronets of Elphinstone (1628): see Sir William Elphinstone, 1st Baronet (died 1645)
- Elphinstone baronets of Logie (1701)
- Elphinstone baronets of Sowerby (1816)
