= Philip Lybbe Powys Lybbe =

Philip Lybbe Powys Lybbe (12 June 1818 – 12 September 1897) was an English rower, barrister and Conservative politician who sat in the House of Commons between 1859 and 1865.

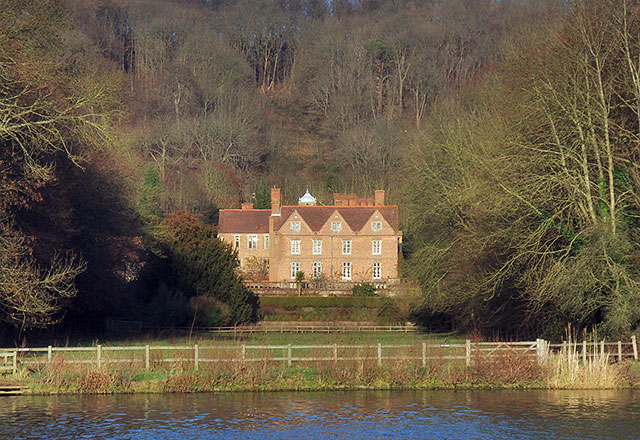
Hardwick House on the banks of the Thames

== Life ==
He was born as Powys at Broomfield House, Southgate, Middlesex, the son of Henry Philip Powys and his wife Julia Barrington. The Powys family lived at Hardwick House near Whitchurch-on-Thames which they had inherited some generations earlier from a marriage with the heiress to the Lybbes who had been its owners. He was educated at Eton College, and matriculated at Balliol College, Oxford in 1836, where he graduated B.A. in 1839 and M.A. in 1843.

Philip Powys became a barrister and was J.P. for Oxfordshire. At the 1859 general election, Powys was elected as a Conservative Member of Parliament for Newport Isle of Wight. In a law case reported in the Reading Mercury of 15 November 1862, it was reported that he was lame and always walked with a heavy stick, with which he was said to have assaulted a defaulting tenant.

Powys obtained a Royal Licence to change his name on 18 February 1863. Subsequently he used the final name Lybbe. He held his seat in parliament until the 1865 general election.

Philip Lybbe died aged 79 at The Den, Patcham, Sussex and was buried at the church of St. Mary the Virgin, Whitchurch on Thames.

== Oarsman ==
Powys stated "I have been an oarsman since my boyhood; could row probably before I could write. I was reared on the banks of Thames. My father was a very good oarsman at St John's, Oxford, and put me to work going down in the boat to Mapledurham church on Sunday afternoons". He also noted "I rowed all through my Eton and Oxford life" and "I found my College Boat the cheapest amusement in Oxford. I never hunted, but always rowed".

In 1839 Powys rowed number 7 in the Oxford boat in the Boat Race. In 1841 and 1842 as a member of The Midge, Oxford Club, London, he was a member of the winning crew in the Stewards' Challenge Cup at Henley.

== Family ==
Philip Powys married Ann Phillis Greenwood at Tilehurst, Berkshire on 11 June 1844 and they had five children, all surnamed Powys; there was no divorce between Philip and Ann. Around 1862 he began a relationship with Fanny Worth; they had three children, all surnamed Lybbe.

== See also ==
- List of Oxford University Boat Race crews

Parliament of the United Kingdom
| Preceded by Charles Buxton; Charles Mangles | Member of Parliament for Newport; 1859 – 1865; With: Robert Kennard | Succeeded by Charles Wykeham Martin; Robert Kennard |
