= Richard Sutton (MP, died 1634) =

English politician

Richard Sutton (died 26 April 1634), of Lincoln's Inn and later of Acton, Middlesex, was an English politician, courtier and lawyer.

He was a Member (MP) of the Parliament of England for Newport, Isle of Wight in 1586 and for Newtown, Isle of Wight in 1589. He served as Auditor of the Exchequer from 1600.

He owned homes in the City of London and at Acton, west London, and also the manors of Sapperton, Lincolnshire, North Bersted and Shripney in Sussex.

Sutton and his wife Elizabeth (d.1625) had a daughter, also named Elizabeth, who married three times. Firstly to Sir James Altham (d.1617), Baron of the Exchequer; secondly to Sir John Ashfield (d.1635), who served as Gentleman of the Privy Chamber to Charles I; and thirdly to the Master of Sidney Sussex College, Sir Richard Minshull. Lady Sutton is buried in St Mary's Church, Acton.

Parliament of England
Preceded by Ralph Bourchier; Edmund Carey	Member of Parliament for Newport, Isle of Wight; 1586; With: Richard Hardy (MP)	Succeeded by Edmund Carey; Richard Hardy
Parliament of England
Preceded by Richard Huyshe; Richard Dillington (died 1604)	Member of Parliament for Newtown, Isle of Wight; 1589; With: Richard Huyshe	Succeeded by Thomas Dudley; Richard Browne
