= William Cotton (MP for Newport, Isle of Wight) =

English politician

Member of Parliament for Newport
- In office 1593–1601 Serving with Richard Huyshe; Richard James
- Preceded by: Sir Edmund Carey; Richard Hardy
- Succeeded by: Thomas Crompton

Member of Parliament for Yarmouth
- In office 1601–1604 Serving with Stephen Theobald
- Preceded by: Benedict Barnham; John Snow
- Succeeded by: Arthur Bromfield; Thomas Cheeke

Personal details
- Born: c. 1553
- Spouse: Anne Cotton (nee Smith)
- Parents: Sir Richard Cotton (father); Jane Cotton (nee Onley) (mother)
- Education: Magdalen College

William Cotton was an English politician who served as MP for Newport and then Yarmouth in the Isle of Wight.
