= 1870 Newport (Isle of Wight) by-election =

UK Parliamentary by-election

The 1870 Newport (Isle of Wight) by-election was fought on 23 November 1870. The by-election was fought due to the Death of the incumbent MP of the Liberal Party, Charles Wykeham Martin. It was won by the Liberal candidate Charles Cavendish Clifford.
