= Charles Buxton =

English brewer, philanthropist, writer and politician

Charles Buxton (18 November 1822 – 10 August 1871) was an English brewer, philanthropist, writer and member of Parliament.

== Personal life and architectural legacy ==
Buxton was born on 18 November 1822 in Cromer, Norfolk, the third son of Sir Thomas Buxton, 1st Baronet, a notable brewer, MP and social reformer, and followed in his father's footsteps, becoming a partner in the brewery of Truman, Hanbury, Buxton, & Co in Brick Lane, Spitalfields, London, and then an MP. He served as Liberal MP for Newport, Isle of Wight (1857–1859), Maidstone (1859–1865) and East Surrey (1865–1871). His son Sydney Buxton was also an MP and governor of South Africa.

On 7 February 1850, he married Emily Mary Holland, the eldest daughter of physician Henry Holland (physician to Queen Victoria and later president of the Royal Institution).

Around 1850, he commissioned construction of a small detached, but ornate, house, Foxholm (Grade II-listed architecturally) on Redhill Road, then in Wisley but now in Cobham, for the Chaplain to Queen Victoria.

On 4 May 1860 he was commissioned Lieutenant in the part-time 3rd (Truman, Hanbury, Buxton) Tower Hamlets Rifle Volunteer Corps raised by his nephew Sir Fowell Buxton, 3rd Baronet from employees of the family brewery. The unit became part of the 1st Administrative Battalion, Tower Hamlets Rifle Volunteer Corps in which Charles Buxton became Major and then Lieutenant-Colonel on 1 June 1861. He left the unit in the later 1860s but was appointed Honorary Colonel of the 1st (Poplar) Tower Hamlets Artillery Volunteer Corps on 15 August 1870.

In 1860 he had his own house, Foxwarren Park, built on the neighbouring estate between a golf course and the Site of Special Scientific Interest which is Ockham and Wisley Commons. It is a Grade II* listed building. The building is stark Neo-Gothic: polychrome brickwork, red with blue diapering, and terracotta dressings, renewed plain-tiled roofs with crow-stepped gables.

He died on 10 August 1871. His probate was sworn in 1871 in a broad bracket of "under £250,000 (equivalent to about £29,400,000 in 2023)".

His younger son was first and last Earl Buxton: Sydney Buxton, 1st Earl Buxton.

== Anti-slavery parliamentary campaigners' memorial fountain ==
Following his father's death, Buxton commissioned architect Samuel Sanders Teulon to design the Buxton Memorial Fountain to commemorate his father's role, with others, in the abolition of slavery. The fountain was initially erected in Parliament Square but was later moved to its current position in Victoria Tower Gardens, Westminster. It carries the dedication:

Erected in 1865 by Charles Buxton MP in commemoration of the emancipation of slaves 1834 and in memory of his father, Sir T Fowell Buxton, and those associated with him: Wilberforce, Clarkson, Macaulay, Brougham, Dr Lushington and others.

== Published works ==
He produced Memoirs of Sir Thomas Fowell Buxton, Baronet, with Selections from his Correspondence, first published in 1848. He later wrote a history, Slavery and Freedom in the British West Indies, published in 1860.

Parliament of the United Kingdom
Preceded by William Nathaniel Massey; Robert William Kennard	Member of Parliament for Newport; 1857–1859; With: Charles Edward Mangles	Succeeded by Philip Lybbe Powys; Robert William Kennard
Preceded by Alexander Beresford Hope; Edward Scott	Member of Parliament for Maidstone; 1859–1865; With: William Lee	Succeeded by William Lee; James Whatman
Preceded by Peter John Locke King; Thomas Alcock	Member of Parliament for East Surrey; 1865–1871; With: Peter John Locke King	Succeeded by Peter John Locke King; James Watney
