= William Mount (Isle of Wight MP) =

British Tory politician (1787–1869)

William Mount DL of Wasing Place, Berkshire (21 November 1787 – 10 April 1869) was a British Tory politician.

He was the son of William Mount (3 January 1753 – 15 June 1815) and his wife (m. 4 October 1781) Jenny (? – 11 October 1843), daughter of Thomas Page. His paternal grandfather, John Mount (? – 1786; son of William Mount and Jane Huckell), High Sheriff of Berkshire in 1770, built Wasing Place. The Mount family were in business as stationers at Tower Hill, London from the late seventeenth century.

He is the great-great-grandfather of Ferdinand Mount and the great-great-great-grandfather of Prime Minister of the United Kingdom David Cameron. He was educated at Eton College (1802–05) and Oriel College, Oxford (1805).

William Mount was the Member of Parliament (MP) for Yarmouth from 1818 to 1819 and for Newport, Isle of Wight from 1831 to 1832. He was appointed High Sheriff of Berkshire for 1826–27.

He married, on 27 June 1818, Charlotte (d. 17 January 1879), the daughter and coheiress of George Talbot of Temple Guiting, Gloucestershire. They had two sons, including William George Mount, and two daughters.

His wife was the daughter of George Talbot (1763–1836) and wife (m. 4 January 1789) Charlotte Elizabeth Drake (? – 1817), paternal granddaughter of The Hon. Rev. George Talbot (a son of the 1st Baron Talbot), of Guiting, Gloucester (d. 1765 or 19 November 1782) and wife (m. 3 January 1761) The Hon. Anne de Bouverie (1729 – 31 December 1813) (a daughter of the 1st Viscount Folkestone), and maternal granddaughter of The Rev. Thomas Drake and wife.

Parliament of the United Kingdom
| Preceded by John Leslie Foster; John Singleton Copley | Member of Parliament for Yarmouth; 1818–1819; With: John Taylor | Succeeded by Sir Peter Pole; John Wilson Croker |
| Preceded by Spencer Perceval; Horace Twiss | Member of Parliament for Newport; 1831 – 1832; With: James Joseph Hope-Vere | Succeeded by John Heywood Hawkins; William Henry Ord |
