= James Francis Hollings =

English historian (1806 – 1862)

- Born: 15 April 1806; Chelsea, England
- Died: September 15, 1862 (aged 56); Stoneygate, England
- Occupation: Historian
- Spouse: Sarah Biggs (m. 1849)

James Francis Hollings (1806 – 1862) was an English historian, poet and writer.

He is famous mostly for his biographies of Marcus Tullius Cicero and the Swedish king Gustavus Adolphus.

== Biography ==
Hollings was born on April 15, 1806.

In 1837, Hollings moved to Leicester, where he worked as a schoolteacher at the Proprietary School on New Walk, which "declared itself to be unsectarian, liberal and utilitarian". Circa 1846, Hollings became the school's headmaster, though the school eventually closed in the winter of 1847.

While in Leicester, Hollings became involved with the Literary and Philosophical Society. In 1841, the Society opened the New Hall, which became the location for the museum and Mechanics' Institute, where Hollings would later lecture. After the Proprietary School on New Walk closed, Hollings served as the Society's president, first from 1846-47, then returning to the role in 1853-54 and 1858-59.

In 1849, Hollings married Sarah Biggs (1815-1862), who came from a hosiery family known for their Chartist politics. Her brothers were Liberal and Radical politicians John Biggs and William Biggs, who served in the House of Commons. After their marriage, Hollings and Sarah moved into the Biggs's Stoneygate estate.

In November 1851, Hollings qualified as barrister-at-law, though he did not practice.

In 1854, Hollings became the editor of the Leicester Mercury.

Three years later, Hollings became a local magistrate, and in November, won a seat on the Town Council for Middle St Margarets ward. He resigned three years later.

Sarah died of typhus on 22 May 1862, the fourth death in the Biggs's family in a year and a half. Due to decreasing financial capacity, Hollings list the Biggs's estate for sale. Before the house sold, he died by suicide on September 15, 1862.

Two years after Hollings's death, British architect John Henry Chamberlain designed a memorial in Hollings's honour, which later became known as "Leicester's little Clock Tower". By 1955, the monument was found to be in disrepair, leading to its destruction.

== Publications ==
He is the author of several notable books:

- The life of Gustavus Adolphus, surnamed the Great, King of Sweden.
- The life of Marcus Tullius Cicero
- The History of Leicester During the Great Civil War
