= John Heywood Hawkins =

British politician and barrister

John Heywood Hawkins (21 May 1802 – 27 June 1877) was a British politician and barrister.

The son of John Hawkins, Hawkins largely grew up at Bignor Park in West Sussex. Hawkins was educated at Eton College, and then at Trinity College, Cambridge, qualifying as a barrister. He had a keen interest in architecture and landscape gardening.

Hawkins was the nephew of Christopher Hawkins, who controlled the rotten borough of Mitchell in Cornwall. At the 1830 UK general election, John was elected in Mitchell, but unlike his uncle, he was a Whig, and supported the Great Reform Act.

Hawkins lost the Mitchell seat at the 1831 UK general election, but government ministers were keen to retain him, and he won Tavistock a few weeks later. He supported the Reform Act 1832, although he opposed the enfranchisement of tenants who paid at least £50 in annual rent. At the 1832 UK general election, he switched to contest Newport (Isle of Wight). He held the seat until 1841, when he stood down.

He was the last known owner of the missing Anglo-Saxon Witham bowl.

Parliament of the United Kingdom
Preceded by Henry Labouchere; William Leake	Member of Parliament for Mitchell; 1830–1831; With: Hon. Lloyd Kenyon	Succeeded by William Best; Hon. Lloyd Kenyon
Preceded by William Russell; John Russell	Member of Parliament for Tavistock; 1831–1832; With: William Russell (1831); Francis Russell (1831–1832)	Succeeded by Charles Richard Fox; William Russell
Preceded by James Joseph Hope-Vere; William Mount	Member of Parliament for Newport (Isle of Wight); 1832–1841; With: William Henry Ord (1832–1837); William John Blake (1837–1841)	Succeeded by Charles Wykeham Martin; William Hamilton
