= William Nathaniel Massey =

British barrister, author and Member of Parliament

The Right Honourable William Nathaniel Massey
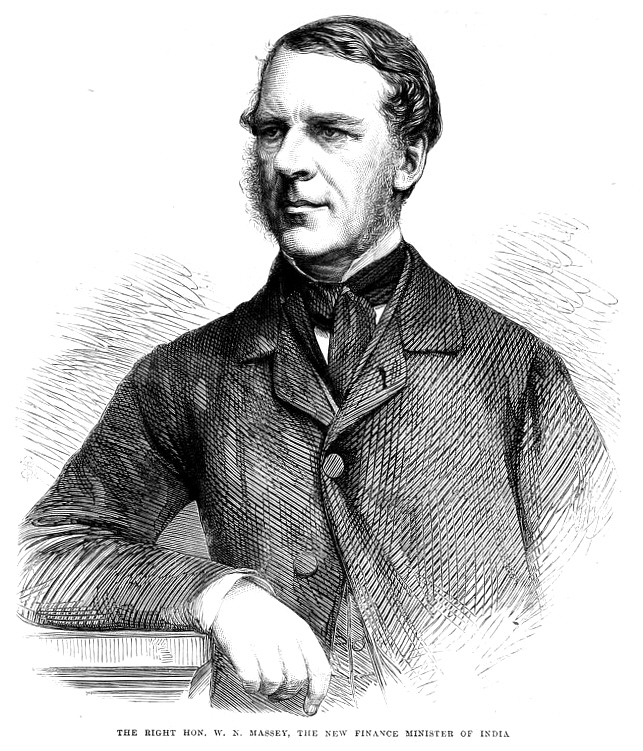

Under-Secretary of State for the Home Department
- In office 1855–1858
- Preceded by: William Cowper
- Succeeded by: Gathorne Hardy

Personal details
- Born: 3 June 1809
- Died: 25 October 1881 (aged 72) London, England

William Nathaniel Massey (3 June 1809 – 25 October 1881) was a British barrister, writer and Liberal Member of Parliament.

== Early life ==
Massey studied law, being admitted as a student at the Inner Temple in November 1826, and was called to the bar in January 1844. He married firstly in 1833, Frances Carleton, daughter of Rev John Orde. Massey practised on the Western Circuit and in 1852 was appointed recorder of Portsmouth and in 1855 of Plymouth.

== In politics ==
He first entered the House of Commons in July 1852 as a Liberal member for Newport, Isle of Wight. In April 1857 he became MP for Salford. In August 1855 he was appointed Under-Secretary of State for the Home Department during the first ministry of Lord Palmerston, and became a member of Brooks's. He held the office until March 1858 when the Conservatives came to power, and Lord Derby formed his second government. He continued to represent Salford in the Commons until 1865, and was appointed Chairman of Committees of the Whole House. He purchased the old ruined estate at Old Basing House, Hampshire.

In January 1865 Massey left parliament to become a member of the Council of the Governor-General of India. He was nominated to the position of Minister for Finance in the British Raj, and was sworn onto the Privy Council. He retired from the council in 1868. As a "City Liberal" club member, Massey contested the constituency of Liverpool on 17 November 1868. He was finally returned to parliament in November 1872 as MP for Tiverton, a seat he held until his death.

== Later life ==
In 1869 Massey became chairman of the National Bank (later part of the Royal Bank of Scotland), a post he held for the rest of his life. He was a member of the Athenaeum Club; and was chairman of St John's Hospital for Diseases of the Skin. He died at his London home, 96 Portland Place, in October 1881.

== Works ==
Massey's major work was A History of England under George III, which was published in four volumes between 1855 and 1863, by J. W. Parker & Son. It was unfinished, and drew on research of Edward Hawke Locker on George II. He also wrote:

- Common Sense versus Common Law. London, Longman, Brown, Green, and Longmans, 1850.

== Family ==
His first wife was Frances Carleton Orde (3 November 1806 – 11 July 1872) daughter of John Orde and Frances Carleton, and their son was Charles Carleton Massey (23 December 1838 –29 March 1905), the writer on spiritualism, psychic phenomena, mysticism and theosophy.

In 1880, shortly before his last illness, Massey married Helen Henrietta, youngest daughter of the late Patrick Grant, Esq., Sheriff-Clerk of Inverness.

Political offices
Preceded by William Cowper	Under-Secretary of State for the Home Department; 1855 – 1858	Succeeded by Gathorne Hardy
Parliament of the United Kingdom
Preceded by Charles Martin; William Plowden	Member of Parliament for Newport, Hants; 1852 – 1857; With: William Biggs	Succeeded by Charles Mangles; Charles Buxton
Preceded by Edward Ryley Langworthy	Member of Parliament for Salford; 1857 – February 1865	Succeeded by John Cheetham
Preceded by George Denman; John Heathcoat-Amory	Member of Parliament for Tiverton; 1872 – 1881; With: John Heathcoat-Amory	Succeeded by Viscount Ebrington; John Heathcoat-Amory
