= William John Blake =

English Whig politician

Member of Parliament for Newport (Isle of Wight)
- In office 26 July 1837 – 1 July 1841 Serving with John Heywood Hawkins
- Preceded by: John Heywood Hawkins; William Henry Ord
- Succeeded by: Charles Wykeham Martin; William Hamilton

Personal details
- Born: 1805
- Died: 15 September 1875 (aged 69–70)
- Party: Whig

William John Blake (1805 – 15 September 1875) was a British Whig politician.

The first-born son of William Blake and Mary Nash, he was educated at Christ Church, Oxford, where he was a president of the United Debating Society, and at Lincoln's Inn.

Blake was elected a Whig Member of Parliament for Newport (Isle of Wight) at the 1837 general election but held the seat for just one term until 1841, when he stood but ended bottom of four candidates. He stood again for election at the 1847 general election, but he was unsuccessful, ending third of four candidates.

Parliament of the United Kingdom
Preceded by John Heywood Hawkins; William Henry Ord	Member of Parliament for Newport (Isle of Wight); 1837–1841; With: John Heywood Hawkins	Succeeded by Charles Wykeham Martin; William Hamilton
