= Newport (Isle of Wight) (constituency) =

Former parliamentary constituency in the United Kingdom

Newport
- Former borough constituency for the House of Commons
- County: Isle of Wight
- Major settlements: Newport

1584–1885
- Seats: 1584–1868: Two; 1868–1885: One
- Created from: Hampshire
- Replaced by: Isle of Wight

1295–1298
- Seats: Two
- Type of constituency: Borough constituency
- Replaced by: Hampshire

Newport was a parliamentary borough located in Newport (Isle of Wight), which was abolished in for the 1885 general election. It was occasionally referred to by the alternative name of Medina.

(Prior to the Reform Act 1832 there was also a separate Newport parliamentary borough in Cornwall.)

== History ==
The borough was first represented in the parliament of 1295, and returned two members of parliament (MPs) from 1584 to 1868. At the 1868 election the Second Reform Act reduced its representation to a single seat, and under the Redistribution of Seats Act 1885 the constituency was abolished altogether with effect from the 1885 general election. Newport's re-enfranchisement in 1584, like that of the other Isle of Wight boroughs (Newtown and Yarmouth) seems to have been at the urging of the new Governor of the island, Sir George Carey, a relative of the Queen. In token of thanks, the borough granted him for life the right to nominate one of the two MPs – which seems to have been the reward he expected and the motive for his petition to the Queen in the first place.

Between 1807 and 1811 its two seats were held by two future Prime Ministers: Arthur Wellesley, later to become the Duke of Wellington (who also found himself elected to two other seats at the same time), and Henry Temple (later Lord Palmerston), who would go on to become one of the United Kingdom's most notable Prime Ministers. Palmerston's late father had been unable to convert his Irish title into a United Kingdom peerage, therefore the young politician was able to enter the Commons. The local patron arranging the deal was Sir Leonard Holmes, who made it a condition that they never visited the borough.

The borough was also represented by two other future Prime Ministers in the 1820s. George Canning was MP for Newport when appointed Prime Minister in 1827; however, under the law as it then stood a minister accepting office automatically vacated his seat and had to stand for re-election to the Commons, and Canning chose to stand at Seaford, a government pocket borough in Sussex, rather than fight Newport again. In the by-election that followed at Newport, the vacancy was filled by the election of the Honourable William Lamb, later 2nd Viscount Melbourne, whose father had also represented the borough in the 1790s. However, Lamb remained MP for Newport for only two weeks before also being elected for Bletchingley, which he preferred to represent.

Before the Great Reform Act 1832, the right to vote was vested in the mayor and corporation (consisting of 11 aldermen and 12 burgesses). For much of the previous century the borough was "managed" for the government by the Holmes family, meaning that ministers could generally secure the election of their favoured candidates, but often only at the expense of considerable "gratuities" to the voters – in 1754, this apparently amounted to a payment of £600 for each candidate. The borough consisted of the parish of Newport and of Castle Hold in the parish of St Nicholas, thereby excluding that part of the town which extended over the boundary into Carisbrooke parish; this gave the borough a population of 4,398 in 1831. The 1832 reforms extended the borough to take in the rest of the town, raising the population to 6,700, though the electorate was still only 421.

Newport's representation was reduced from two members to one by the Second Reform Act for the 1868 general election, and abolished altogether in 1885, leaving the town represented as part of the Isle of Wight county constituency.

== Members of Parliament ==
=== MPs 1584–1660 ===
Parliament	First member	Second member
1584	Sir Ralph Bourchier	Edmund Carey
1586	Richard Sutton	Richard Hardy
1588	Sir Edmund Carey	Richard Hardy
1593	William Cotton	Richard Huyshe
1597	William Cotton	Richard James
1601	Thomas Crompton	Richard James
1604	Richard James	John Ashdell
1614	Sir Richard Worsley, 1st Baronet	John Searle
1621–1622	Sir Richard Worsley, 1st Baronet died 1621 and replaced by Philip Fleming	Sir William Uvedale
1624	Philip Fleming	Christopher Brooke, sat for York and replaced by John Danvers
1625	Sir Nathaniel Rich	Philip Fleming
1626	Christopher Yelverton	Philip Fleming
1628–1629	Christopher Yelverton	Philip Fleming
1629–1640	No Parliaments summoned	
1640 (Apr)	The Viscount Falkland	Sir Henry Worsley, 2nd Baronet
1640 (Nov)	The Viscount Falkland disabled to sit, September 1642	Sir Henry Worsley, 2nd Baronet
1645	Sir Henry Worsley, 2nd Baronet excluded in Pride's Purge, December 1648	William Stephens
1653–1659	Newport was unrepresented in the Barebones and First and Second Protectorate Parliaments	
1659	Thomas Boreman (of Broke)	Sir Robert Dillington, 2nd Baronet
1659–1660	Sir Henry Worsley, 2nd Baronet	William Stephens

=== MPs 1660–1868 ===
Election	First member	First party	Second member	Second party
1660	Robert Dillington		William Oglander	
1661	William Glascock		William Oglander	
1670	William Glascock		Sir Robert Dillington	
February 1679	Admiral Sir Robert Holmes		Sir Robert Dillington	
August 1679	John Leigh		Sir Robert Dillington	
1685	Admiral Sir Robert Holmes		Sir William Stephens	
January 1689	Sir Robert Dillington		Sir William Stephens	
June 1689	Edward Dillington		Sir William Stephens	
1690	Admiral Sir Robert Holmes		Sir William Stephens	
1692	Brigadier Richard Leveson		Sir William Stephens	
November 1695	Brigadier The Lord Cutts		Sir Robert Cotton	
December 1695	Sir Henry Colt		Sir Robert Cotton	
1698	Major-General The Lord Cutts		Sir Robert Cotton	
1699	Henry Greenhill		Sir Robert Cotton	
January 1701	Major-General The Lord Cutts		Samuel Shepheard	
March 1701	Henry Greenhill		Samuel Shepheard	
December 1701	Major-General The Lord Cutts		Edward Richards	
March 1702	Colonel James Stanhope	Whig	Edward Richards	
July 1702	Major-General The Lord Cutts		William Stephens	
1707	Sir Tristram Dillington		William Stephens	
October 1710	Lieutenant-General John Richmond Webb	Tory	William Stephens	
December 1710	Lieutenant-General William Seymour		William Stephens	
1713	General John Richmond Webb	Tory	William Stephens	
1715	Anthony Morgan		William Stephens	
April 1717	Lieutenant-General James Stanhope	Whig	William Stephens	
July 1717	Lieutenant-Colonel Sir Tristram Dillington		William Stephens	
1721	Thomas Stanwix		William Stephens	
March 1722	Earl of March		The Lord Whitworth	
October 1722	Colonel Charles Cadogan		The Lord Whitworth	
1726	Colonel Charles Cadogan		George Huxley	
January 1727	Sir William Willys		George Huxley	
August 1727	William Fortescue		George Huxley	
1736	The Viscount Boyne		George Huxley	
May 1741	Anthony Chute		Monoux Cope	
July 1747	Captain Bluett Wallop		Thomas Lee Dummer	
1749	Ralph Jenison		Thomas Lee Dummer	
1758	Rear-Admiral Charles Holmes		Thomas Lee Dummer	
1762	William Rawlinson Earle		Thomas Lee Dummer	
1765	William Rawlinson Earle		Thomas Dummer	
1768	John Eames		Hans Sloane	
1773	Hon. John St. John		Hans Sloane	
1774	Sir Richard Worsley		Hans Sloane	
1780	Sir Richard Worsley		Hon. John St. John	
1784	Edward Rushworth		Captain the Hon. Hugh Seymour-Conway	
1786	Edward Rushworth		Hon. John Townshend	
January 1790	Edward Rushworth		George Byng	
June 1790	The Viscount Palmerston		The Viscount Melbourne	
1793	The Viscount Palmerston		Peniston Lamb	
May 1796	Jervoise Clarke Jervoise		Edward Rushworth	
November 1796	William Hamilton Nisbet		Andrew Strahan	
1800	Sir George Dallas		Andrew Strahan	
1802	John Blackburn		Richard Gervas Ker	
1806	Isaac Corry		Major General Sir John Doyle	
1807	The Viscount Palmerston	Tory	Sir Arthur Wellesley	Tory
1809	The Viscount Palmerston	Tory	Sir Leonard Worsley-Holmes	
1811	Cecil Bisshopp		Sir Leonard Worsley-Holmes	
1812	Richard Worsley-Holmes		Sir Leonard Worsley-Holmes	
1814	John Delgarno		Sir Leonard Worsley-Holmes	
1816	George Watson-Taylor		Sir Leonard Worsley-Holmes	
1818	Charles Duncombe		Sir Leonard Worsley-Holmes	
1825	Charles Duncombe		Hon. John Stuart	
1826	George Canning	Tory	Hon. William Scott	Tory
April 1827	Hon. William Lamb	Whig	Hon. William Scott	Tory
May 1827	Spencer Perceval	Tory	Hon. William Scott	Tory
1830	Spencer Perceval	Tory	Horace Twiss	Tory
1831	William Mount	Tory	James Joseph Hope-Vere	Tory
1832	John Heywood Hawkins	Whig	William Henry Ord	Whig
1837	John Heywood Hawkins	Whig	William John Blake	Whig
1841	Charles Wykeham Martin	Conservative	William Hamilton	Conservative
1847	Charles Wykeham Martin	Peelite	William Plowden	Peelite
1852	William Biggs	Radical	William Nathaniel Massey	Radical
February 1857	Robert Kennard	Conservative	William Nathaniel Massey	Radical
March 1857	Charles Edward Mangles	Whig	Charles Buxton	Whig
1859	Robert Kennard	Conservative	Philip Lybbe Powys	Conservative
1865	Robert Kennard	Conservative	Charles Wykeham Martin	Liberal
1868	Representation reduced to one member			

=== MPs 1868–1885 ===
Election	Member	Party
1868	Charles Wykeham Martin	Liberal
1870	Charles Clifford	Liberal
1885	constituency abolished	

== Election results ==
=== Elections in the 1830s ===
General election 1830: Newport
Party	Candidate	Votes	%
Tory	Spencer Perceval	Unopposed	
Tory	Horace Twiss	Unopposed	
Registered electors		24	
Tory hold			
Tory hold			

General election 1831: Newport
Party	Candidate	Votes	%
Tory	William Mount	Unopposed	
Tory	James Joseph Hope-Vere	Unopposed	
Registered electors		24	
Tory hold			
Tory hold			

General election 1832: Newport
Party	Candidate	Votes	%
Whig	John Heywood Hawkins	216	36.4
Whig	William Henry Ord	216	36.4
Tory	James Willoughby Gordon	161	27.2
Majority		55	9.2
Turnout		365	86.7
Registered electors		421	
Whig gain from Tory			
Whig gain from Tory			

General election 1835: Newport
Party	Candidate	Votes	%	±%
Whig	William Henry Ord	233	26.0	−10.4
Whig	John Heywood Hawkins	230	25.6	−10.8
Conservative	James Willoughby Gordon	229	25.5	+11.9
Conservative	William Hamilton	205	22.9	+9.3
Majority		1	0.1	−9.1
Turnout		c. 449	c. 89.7	c. +3.0
Registered electors		500		
Whig hold		Swing	−10.5	
Whig hold		Swing	−10.7	

Ord was appointed as a Lord Commissioner of the Treasury, requiring a by-election.

By-election, 27 April 1835: Newport
Party	Candidate	Votes	%
Whig	William Henry Ord	Unopposed	
Whig hold			

General election 1837: Newport
Party	Candidate	Votes	%	±%
Whig	John Heywood Hawkins	265	26.3	+0.7
Whig	William John Blake	263	26.1	+0.1
Conservative	Charles Wykeham Martin	244	24.2	−1.3
Conservative	William Hamilton	236	23.4	+0.5
Majority		19	1.9	+1.8
Turnout		506	79.9	c. −9.8
Registered electors		633		
Whig hold		Swing	+0.6	
Whig hold		Swing	+0.3	

=== Elections in the 1840s ===
General election 1841: Newport
Party	Candidate	Votes	%	±%
Conservative	Charles Wykeham Martin	254	26.4	+2.2
Conservative	William Hamilton	252	26.2	+2.8
Whig	Thomas Gisborne	229	23.8	−2.5
Whig	William John Blake	226	23.5	−2.6
Majority		23	2.4	N/A
Turnout		485	64.7	−15.2
Registered electors		750		
Conservative gain from Whig		Swing	+2.4	
Conservative gain from Whig		Swing	+2.7	

General election 1847: Newport
Party	Candidate	Votes	%	±%
Peelite	William Plowden	262	26.1	−0.1
Peelite	Charles Wykeham Martin	252	25.1	−1.3
Whig	William John Blake	250	25.0	+1.5
Whig	Charles Crompton	238	23.8	—
Majority		2	0.1	−2.3
Turnout		501 (est)	77.6 (est)	+12.9
Registered electors		646		
Peelite gain from Conservative		Swing	−0.4	
Peelite gain from Conservative		Swing	−1.0	

=== Elections in the 1850s ===
General election 1852: Newport
Party	Candidate	Votes	%	±%
Radical	William Biggs	310	27.4	+2.4
Radical	William Nathaniel Massey	306	27.1	+3.3
Peelite	Charles Wykeham Martin	257	22.7	−2.4
Peelite	William Plowden	257	22.7	−3.4
Majority		49	4.4	N/A
Turnout		565 (est)	79.9 (est)	+2.3
Registered electors		707		
Radical gain from Peelite		Swing	+2.7	
Radical gain from Peelite		Swing	+3.1	

Biggs resigned, causing a by-election.

By-election, 11 February 1857: Newport
Party	Candidate	Votes	%	±%
Conservative	Robert Kennard	289	54.3	+8.9
Radical	Charles Seely	243	45.7	−8.8
Majority		46	8.6	N/A
Turnout		532	81.3	+1.4
Registered electors		654		
Conservative gain from Radical		Swing	+8.9	

General election 1857: Newport
Party	Candidate	Votes	%	±%
Whig	Charles Edward Mangles	305	26.8	−0.6
Whig	Charles Buxton	294	25.8	−1.3
Conservative	Robert Kennard	283	24.8	+2.1
Conservative	William Anderson Rose	257	22.6	−0.1
Majority		11	1.0	N/A
Turnout		570 (est)	87.1 (est)	+7.2
Registered electors		654		
Whig gain from Radical		Swing	−0.8	
Whig gain from Radical		Swing	−1.2	

General election 1859: Newport
Party	Candidate	Votes	%	±%
Conservative	Robert Kennard	319	37.1	+12.3
Conservative	Philip Lybbe Powys	312	36.3	+13.7
Liberal	Robert Charles	228	26.5	−26.1
Majority		84	9.8	N/A
Turnout		544 (est)	84.0 (est)	−3.1
Registered electors		647		
Conservative gain from Liberal		Swing	+12.7	
Conservative gain from Liberal		Swing	+13.4	

=== Elections in the 1860s ===
General election 1865: Newport
Party	Candidate	Votes	%	±%
Liberal	Charles Wykeham Martin	309	36.5	+10.0
Conservative	Robert Kennard	307	36.3	−0.8
Conservative	Auberon Herbert	230	27.2	−9.1
Majority		79	9.3	N/A
Turnout		578 (est)	89.8 (est)	+5.8
Registered electors		643		
Liberal gain from Conservative		Swing	+10.0	
Conservative hold		Swing	−2.9	

Seat reduced to one member

General election 1868: Newport
Party	Candidate	Votes	%	±%
Liberal	Charles Wykeham Martin	Unopposed		
Registered electors		965		
Liberal hold				

=== Elections in the 1870s ===
Martin's death caused a by-election.

By-election, 23 November 1870: Newport
Party	Candidate	Votes	%	±%
Liberal	Charles Clifford	437	55.5	N/A
Conservative	Henry Martyn Kennard	351	44.5	New
Majority		86	11.0	N/A
Turnout		788	81.7	N/A
Registered electors		965		
Liberal hold		Swing	N/A	

General election 1874: Newport
Party	Candidate	Votes	%	±%
Liberal	Charles Clifford	522	52.4	N/A
Conservative	Henry Robert Twyford	475	47.6	N/A
Majority		47	4.8	N/A
Turnout		997	85.5	N/A
Registered electors		1,166		
Liberal hold		Swing	N/A	

=== Elections in the 1880s ===
General election 1880: Newport
Party	Candidate	Votes	%	±%
Liberal	Charles Clifford	618	52.5	+0.1
Conservative	Henry Robert Twyford	560	47.5	−0.1
Majority		58	5.0	+0.2
Turnout		1,178	86.5	+1.0
Registered electors		1,362		
Liberal hold		Swing	+0.1	

== See also ==
- Isle of Wight
- Newtown
- Politics of the Isle of Wight
- Parliamentary representation from Isle of Wight

== Notes and references ==
- Robert Beatson, A Chronological Register of Both Houses of Parliament (London: Longman, Hurst, Res & Orme, 1807)
- D Brunton & D H Pennington, "Members of the Long Parliament" (London: George Allen & Unwin, 1954)
- Michael Brock, The Great Reform Act (London: Hutchinson, 1973)
- F W S Craig, British Parliamentary Election Results 1832–1885 (2nd Ed) (Aldershot: Parliamentary Research Services, 1989)
- D Englefield, J Seaton & I White, Facts About the British Prime Ministers (London: Mansell, 1995)
- J E Neale, The Elizabethan House of Commons (London: Jonathan Cape, 1949)
- J Holladay Philbin, Parliamentary Representation 1832 – England and Wales (New Haven: Yale University Press, 1965)
- Henry Stooks Smith, "The Parliaments of England from 1715 to 1847" (2nd edition, edited by FWS Craig – Chichester: Parliamentary Reference Publications, 1973)
- Robert Walcott, English Politics in the Early Eighteenth Century (Oxford: Oxford University Press, 1956)
- Frederic A Youngs, Jr, Guide to the Local Administrative Units of England, Volume I (London: Offices of the Royal Historical Society, 1979)
- Leigh Rayment's Historical List of MPs – Constituencies beginning with "N" (part 1)
