= Philip Fleming =

Philip Fleming may refer to:

- Philip Fleming (MP) (born c. 1587), English lawyer and politician
- Philip Bracken Fleming (1887–1955), American army general and diplomat
- Philip Fleming (banker) (1889–1971), British merchant banker and Olympic rower
