= John Carey, 3rd Baron Hunsdon =

English peer and politician

John Carey KG

3rd Baron Hunsdon
- Reign: 1603–1617
- Predecessor: George Carey, 2nd Baron Hunsdon
- Successor: Henry Carey, 1st Earl of Dover
- Born: c. 1556
- Died: 1617; Hunsdon, Hertfordshire
- Offices: Governor of Berwick-upon-Tweed
- Spouse: Mary Hyde
- Issue: Henry Carey; Henry Carey, 1st Earl of Dover; Charles Carey; Blanche Hunsdon; Anne Carey
- Father: Henry Carey, 1st Baron Hunsdon
- Mother: Anne Morgan

John Carey, 3rd Baron Hunsdon (born c. 1556, died 1617) was an English peer, politician and Governor of Berwick-upon-Tweed.

== Life ==
He was a son of Henry Carey, 1st Baron Hunsdon and Anne Morgan, the younger brother of George Carey, 2nd Baron Hunsdon and a grandson of Mary Boleyn. It is alleged that his father was the illegitimate son of Henry VIII of England born of Mary Boleyn when she was a royal mistress. He was educated at Trinity College, Cambridge. He was knighted in 1598 and succeeded his brother as third Baron Hunsdon in 1603.

He held a number of court and public offices including Gentleman pensioner from 1573 to 1603, Chamberlain of Berwick-upon-Tweed in 1585, Deputy Warden of East March, Justice of the Peace for Cambridgeshire in 1594, and Marshal of Berwick-upon-Tweed from 1596 to 1598 and again in 1603. He was elected MP for Buckingham in 1584, 1589 and 1593.

Carey's letters from Berwick describe the arrest of Jacob Kroger, a goldsmith working for Anne of Denmark and he identifies Anne Murray as the mistress of James VI of Scotland.

Lord Home invited Carey to come from Berwick to meet James VI at Dunglass Castle in January 1595, but he refused to make the trip. Carey wrote in April that James VI and Anne of Denmark planned to come on a progress towards Berwick, including a visit to "Holliday" (Halidon) Hill which overlooked the town and its fortifications. He wrote to his father wondering if the town should give them a cannon salute.

Carey relayed news of Humphrey Dethick, a former employee of Baptist Hicks who came to Dunfermline Palace and killed a man. Carey himself was responsible for the brutal murder of Jock Dalgleish, a Border reiver, who had stolen some horses included one of Carey's, whom he "cutt himself all in peces". As Elizabeth I was shocked and described this as "verie barbarous and seldom used emonge the Turckes", Carey proceeded to justify himself by describing other brutal killings in the Borders and justifying himself that Dalgleish was "not cutt in verie many peeces!".

In June 1603, after the Union of the Crowns and hearing rumours that the Berwick garrison would be downsized and Lord Home made governor, Carey wrote to Robert Cecil that someone should have charge of Berwick, "considering how many distressed and discontented hearts and minds there be in it.

John Carey died at Hunsdon, Hertfordshire in 1617. He was succeeded by his son, Henry Carey, 1st Earl of Dover.

== Family ==
He married Mary, the daughter of Leonard Hyde of Hyde Hall and Throcking, Hertfordshire, widow of Richard Peyton of Little Chesterford, Essex. They had three sons and two daughters.

- Henry Carey, died an infant in 1577.
- Henry Carey, 1st Earl of Dover
- Charles Carey, married Elizabeth Whitbroke
- Blanche Carey (d. 6 November 1651), married 1) Christopher Peyton and 2) Sir Thomas Wodehouse
- Anne Carey (bur. 6 December 1622). She was a maid of honour at the court of Elizabeth I in 1600, and later married Sir Francis Lovell of East Harling

Peerage of England
Preceded by George Carey	Baron Hunsdon; 1603–1617	Succeeded by Henry Carey
