= William Hamilton (geologist) =

British geologist and MP

William Hamilton FRS

Member of Parliament for Newport
- In office 22 July 1841 – 26 August 1847 Serving with John Heywood Hawkins
- Prime Minister: Robert Peel
- Preceded by: William John Blake; Charles Wykeham Martin
- Succeeded by: William Plowden; Charles Wykeham Martin

Personal details
- Born: William John Hamilton; 5 July 1805 Wishaw, Lanarkshire
- Died: 27 June 1867 (aged 61) London
- Party: Conservative
- Spouses: Martin Trotter (m. 1832; died 1833); Margaret Frances Florence Dillon (m. 1838)
- Relations: Frederick W. Hamilton (brother); Frederick Hamilton (nephew); John Udny (grandfather)
- Children: Robert William Hamilton; Margaret Wilhelmina Hamilton; Florence Selina Hamilton; Victoria Henrietta Hamilton; Alexander Charles Hamilton; Constantine Henry Hamilton; Archibald William Hamilton
- Parent(s): William Richard Hamilton; Julia Udny
- Education: Charterhouse School
- Alma mater: University of Göttingen
- Occupation: Geologist

William John Hamilton FRS (5 July 1805 – 27 June 1867) was a British geologist who served as a Conservative Member of Parliament.

== Early life ==
Hamilton was born in Wishaw, Lanarkshire on 5 July 1805. He was the eldest son of William Richard Hamilton, FRS, and the former Julia Udny. His younger brothers were Alexander Edmund Hamilton (who drowned in India in 1827), Capt. Henry George Hamilton of the Royal Navy (father of Adm. Sir Frederick Hamilton), Charles Anthony Hamilton (who worked in the Privy Council office), Arthur Richard Hamilton, and Gen. Frederick William Hamilton.

His paternal grandfather was Anthony Hamilton, the Archdeacon of Colchester. His maternal grandparents were John Udny, British Counsul at Venice and Leghorn, and Selina Shore Clevland (a daughter of John Clevland MP). His uncle, Lt.-Col. John Robert Fullerton Udny inherited Udny Castle in Aberdeen from his uncle, Robert Udny, the prominent merchant and art collector.

He was educated at Charterhouse School and the University of Göttingen.

== Career ==
He became a fellow of the Geological Society of London in 1831. In 1835 he made a geological tour of the Levant with Hugh Edwin Strickland, continuing on his own through Armenia and across Asia Minor. This journey was described in Researches in Asia Minor, Pontus, and Armenia (1842). Hamilton was the first known person to have successfully climbed Mount Erciyes.

He was a Conservative Member of Parliament (MP) for Newport, Isle of Wight, from 1841 to 1847.

Hamilton was president of the Royal Geographical Society between 1848 and 1849, of the Geological Society between 1854 and 1866, and of the Palaeontographical Society between 1855 and 1867. He was elected a Fellow of the Royal Society in 1855. He was elected as a member of the American Philosophical Society in 1862.

He made excursions in France and Belgium and wrote on the rocks and minerals of Tuscany, the agate quarries of Oberstein, and on the geology of the Mayence basin and the Hesse-Kassel (or Hesse-Cassel) district.

== Personal life ==
On 26 April 1832, Hamilton married Martin Trotter, a daughter of John Trotter. Before her death in March 1833, they had a son:

- Robert William Hamilton (1833–1883), who married Charlotte Maria Palmer, a daughter of Lt.-Col. George Palmer.

On 26 July 1838, he married the Hon. Margaret Frances Florence Dillon, a daughter of Henry Augustus Dillon-Lee, 13th Viscount Dillon, and Henrietta Browne (sister to Dominick Browne, 1st Baron Oranmore and Browne). They had six children:

- Margaret Wilhelmina Hamilton (d. 1915), who married Louis Eric Ames, son of Henry Ames of Linden.
- Florence Selina Hamilton (d. 1904), who married Sir Thomas Villiers Lister, son of Thomas Henry Lister, in 1877.
- Victoria Henrietta Hamilton (d. 1917), who married James Graham Goodenough (parents of Adm. Sir William Edmund Goodenough).
- Alexander Charles Hamilton (1840–1920), who successfully claimed the title of 10th Lord Belhaven and Stenton.
- Constantine Henry Hamilton (1843–1885), a Lieutenant-Colonel in the Royal Artillery who died unmarried.
- Archibald William Hamilton (1847–1886), who married Elizabeth Ann Billyard, daughter of W. Billyard, in 1869.

Hamilton died in London in 1867; his wife survived him.

=== Descendants ===
As his son Alexander died without surviving male issue, his grandson Robert Hamilton-Udny (son of his youngest son Archibald), inherited the title of 11th Lord Belhaven and Stenton.

Parliament of the United Kingdom
Preceded by William John Blake; Charles Wykeham Martin	Member of Parliament for Newport; 1841–1847; With: John Heywood Hawkins	Succeeded by William Plowden; Charles Wykeham Martin
