= John Cutts, 1st Baron Cutts =

English Army officer, author and politician (1661–1707)

Lieutenant-General The Right Honourable The Lord Cutts PC (Ire)
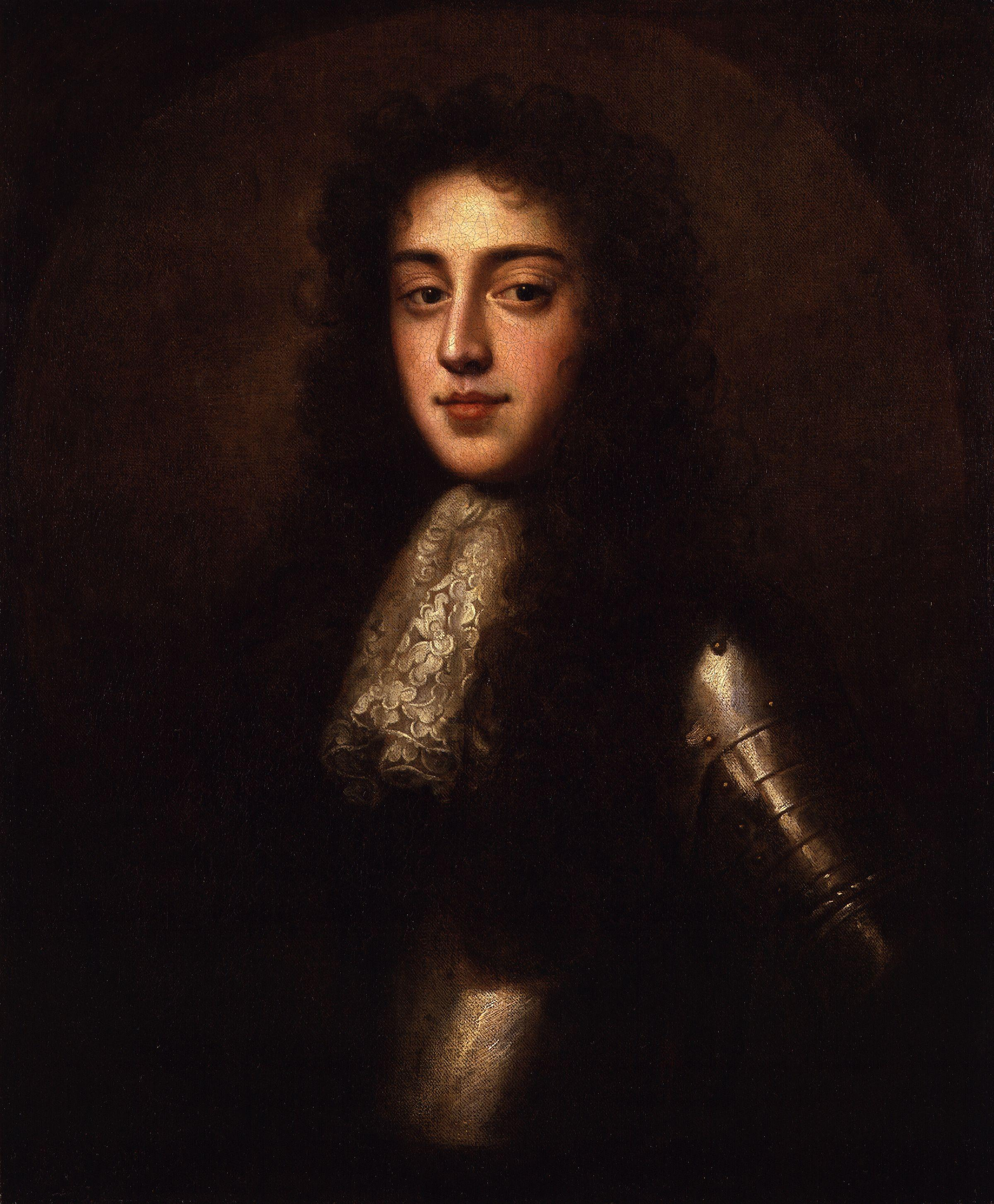
- Portrait by the studio of Willem Wissing, c. 1685
- Born: 1661
- Died: 25 January 1707 (aged 45–46)
- Military career
- Allegiance: England
- Branch: English Army
- Rank: Lieutenant-General
- Commands: Ireland
- Conflicts: Williamite War in Ireland; Nine Years' War; War of the Spanish Succession

Lieutenant-General John Cutts, 1st Baron Cutts, PC (Ire) (1661 – 25 January 1707) was an English Army officer, author and politician.

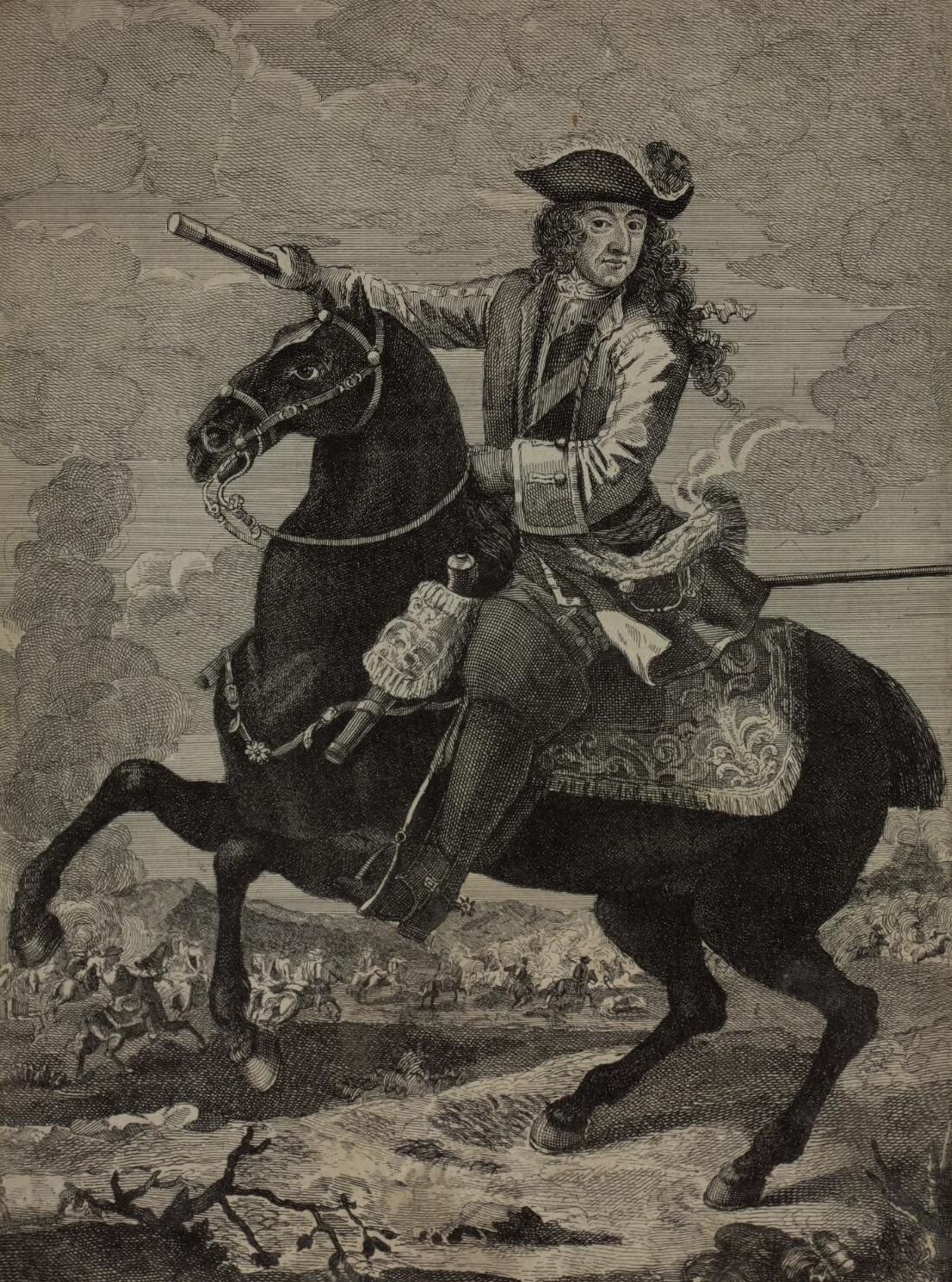
John Cutts in battle

== Early life ==
Cutts was born about 1661 at Woodhall, Arkesden, Essex, the second son of Richard Cutte or Cuttes and Joan Everard (daughter of Sir Richard Everard). The family descended from Sir John Cutts, who served King Henry VIII as Treasurer of the Household. After a short university career at Catharine Hall, Cambridge, he inherited the family estates, but showed a distinct preference for the life of court and camp.

== Career ==
The double ambition for military and literary fame inspired his first work, which appeared in 1685 under the name La Muse de cavalier, or An Apology for such Gentlemen as make Poetry their Diversion not their Business. The next year saw Cutts serving as a volunteer under the Duke of Lorraine in Hungary, and it is said that he was the first to plant the imperial standard on the walls at the storming of Buda (July 1686). In 1687 he published a book of Poetical Exercises. The following year he was serving as lieutenant-colonel in Holland. General Hugh Mackay described Cutts about this time as "pretty tall, lusty and well shaped, an agreeable companion with abundance of wit, affable and familiar, but too much seized with vanity and self-conceit".

Lieutenant-Colonel Cutts was one of William III's companions in the English Revolution of 1688, and in 1690 he went in command of a regiment of foot in Ireland, where he served with distinction. He served with distinction at the Battle of the Boyne (July 1690), and at the siege of Limerick (1690) (where he was wounded), and King William created him Baron Cutts, of Gowran, in the Peerage of Ireland, on 12 December 1690. In 1691 he succeeded to the command of the brigade of the prince of Hesse (wounded at Aughrim in July 1691), and on the surrender of Limerick was appointed commandant of the town. In the following year he served again in Flanders as a brigadier. His brigade of Mackay's division had been almost destroyed at Steinkirk in August 1692. At this battle Cutts himself was wounded.

From 1694 to 1707 Lord Cutts was Governor of the Isle of Wight, including the overall command of the island's militia; he was colonel of the East Medina Regiment. He returned to active service in 1694, holding a command in the disastrous Brest expedition of June 1694. He was one of Carmarthen's companions in the daring reconnaissance of Camaret Bay, and was soon afterwards again wounded. As colonel of the Coldstream Guards Cutts succeeded Talmash, commander of the expedition, who died of his wounds. He served as a commissioner for settling the bank of Antwerp in the following year, distinguishing himself again at the famous Siege of Namur (1695), winning the name "Salamander" by his indifference to the heaviest fire. Though shot in the head while leading an attack against the citadel, he recovered to lead his men to the capture of the works. Thereafter court service and war service alternated.

Cutts was deep in the confidence of William III, and acted as a diplomatic agent in the negotiations which ended in the Peace of Ryswick of 1697. On the occasion of the great fire in Whitehall (1698) Cutts, at the head of the Coldstreamers, earned afresh the honourable nickname of "the Salamander". Later Captain Richard Steele worked as his private secretary. In 1702, as a major-general, Cutts served under Marlborough in the opening campaign of the War of the Spanish Succession of 1701-1714, and at the 1702 siege of Venlo, conspicuous as usual for romantic bravery, he led the stormers at Fort Saint Michael. His enemies, and even the survivors of the assault, were amazed at the success of a seemingly hare-brained enterprise. Probably, however, Cutts, who was now a veteran of great and varied experience, measured the factors of success and failure better than his critics. On this occasion Swift lampooned the lieutenant-general in his Ode to a Salamander. Cutts made the campaign of 1703 in Flanders, and in 1704, after a visit to England, he rejoined Marlborough on the banks of the Danube. At the Battle of Blenheim (August 1704) he held third place in the command of the Allied forces, and his division bore the brunt of the desperate fighting at the village of Blenheim. Blenheim was Cutts's last battle. On 23 March 1705 he was appointed Commander-in-Chief, Ireland, his last appointment. He retained formal command of the Irish army until his death.

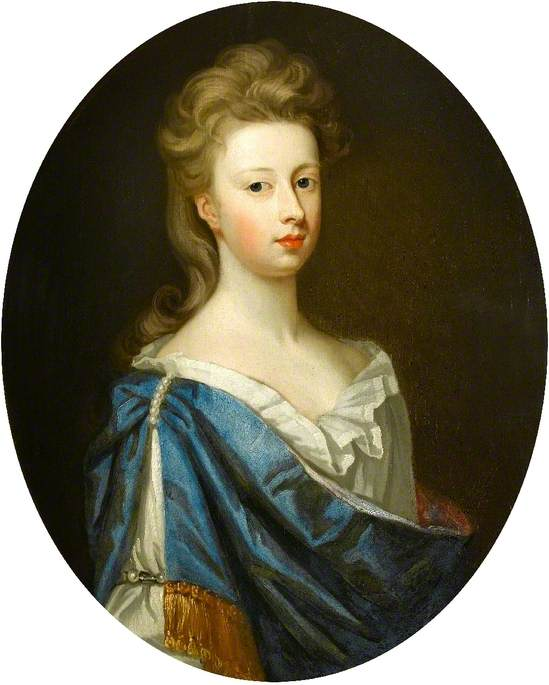
Elizabeth Cutts, John Cutts' second wife

== Later years ==
His remaining years were spent at home, and, at the time of his death, he was the holder of eight distinct political and military offices. He sat in five parliaments for the county of Cambridge, and in Queen Anne's first Parliament he was returned for Newport in the Isle of Wight, for which he sat until the time of his death. He was twice married, but left no issue.

Cutts' old Cambridge college, St Catharine's, organised a dinner to commemorate the tercentenary of his death, held in January 2007.

Parliament of England
Preceded by Sir Levinus Bennet, Bt; Sir Robert Cotton	Member of Parliament for Cambridgeshire; 1693–1702; With: Sir Robert Cotton 1693–1695; Edward Russell 1695–1697; Sir Rushout Cullen, Bt 1697–1702	Succeeded by Sir Rushout Cullen, Bt; Granado Pigot
Preceded by Sir William Stephens; Richard Leveson	Member of Parliament for Newport (Isle of Wight); 1695; With: Sir Robert Cotton	Succeeded by Sir Robert Cotton; Sir Henry Dutton Colt, Bt
Preceded by Sir Robert Cotton; Sir Henry Dutton Colt, Bt	Member of Parliament for Newport (Isle of Wight); 1698–1699; With: Sir Robert Cotton	Succeeded by Sir Robert Cotton; Henry Greenhill
Preceded by Sir Robert Cotton; Henry Greenhill	Member of Parliament for Newport (Isle of Wight); 1701; With: Samuel Shepheard	Succeeded by Samuel Shepheard; Henry Greenhill
Preceded by Samuel Shepheard; Henry Greenhill	Member of Parliament for Newport (Isle of Wight); 1701–1702; With: Edward Richards	Succeeded by Edward Richards; James Stanhope
Preceded by Edward Richards; James Stanhope	Member of Parliament for Newport (Isle of Wight); 1702 – 1707; With: William Stephens	Succeeded by William Stephens; Sir Tristram Dillington, Bt
Military offices
Preceded by Hon. Thomas Tollemache	Governor of the Isle of Wight; 1694–1707	Succeeded by The Duke of Bolton
Preceded by Hon. Thomas Tollemache	Colonel of the Coldstream Regiment of Foot Guards; 1694–1707	Succeeded by Charles Churchill
Peerage of Ireland
New creation	Baron Cutts; 1690–1707	Extinct
