= Sir Charles Clifford, 4th Baronet =

Sir Charles Cavendish Clifford, 4th Baronet (7 January 1821 – 22 November 1895) was an English barrister and Liberal Party politician. He was a member of parliament (MP) for over 20 years, representing seats on the Isle of Wight, and served as private secretary to the Liberal statesman Viscount Palmerston.

== Family and early life ==
Clifford was the third son of Admiral Sir Augustus Clifford, 1st Baronet and his wife Elizabeth Frances, the second daughter of the Whig parliamentarian Lord John Townshend. He was educated at Charterhouse School and at Christ Church, Oxford where he graduated in 1843 with a 4th-class Bachelor of Arts (B.A.) degree in classics. He became a Fellow of All Souls in 1845 and was called to the bar at the Inner Temple in 1846.

He lived at Westfield House, Ryde, on the Isle of Wight. He succeeded to his father's baronetcy in 1893, but the title became extinct on his death in 1895.

== Political career ==
Clifford was elected at the 1857 general election as the Member of Parliament (MP) for the Isle of Wight, and re-elected in 1859, but did stand again at the 1865 general election. He was returned to the House of Commons at a by-election in November 1870 for the borough of Newport, and held that seat until the borough was disenfranchised at the 1885 general election.

He was private secretary for many years to the Liberal statesman Viscount Palmerston, who served as Foreign Secretary, Home Secretary and Prime Minister.

He also held several local ceremonial appointments: he was appointed as a Deputy Lieutenant of Hampshire in 1847, and as a Lieutenant of the Isle of Wight Rifle Volunteers in January 1860, but had resigned the latter commission by February 1863.

== Works ==
Clifford was the author of translations of Aristophanes' Ranae and of the Aeschylus's Prometheus Vinctus.

Parliament of the United Kingdom
Preceded by Francis Venables-Vernon-Harcourt	Member of Parliament for Isle of Wight; 1857 – 1865	Succeeded by John Simeon
Preceded by Charles Wykeham Martin	Member of Parliament for Newport (Isle of Wight); 1870 – 1885	Constituency abolished
Baronetage of the United Kingdom
Preceded by Robert Cavendish Spencer Clifford	Baronet of the Navy; 1892–1895	Extinct
