= Sir Henry Worsley, 2nd Baronet =

English politician

Sir Henry Worsley, 2nd Baronet (1613 – 11 September 1666), was an English politician who sat in the House of Commons of England in 1640 and from 1660 to 1666. He supported the Parliamentarian side in the English Civil War.

Worsley was the son of Sir Richard Worsley, 1st Baronet, and his wife Frances Neville, daughter of Sir Henry Neville of Billingbere, Berkshire. He inherited the Worsley baronetcy on the death of his father in 1621.

In April 1640, Worsley was elected Member of Parliament for Newport (Isle of Wight) for the Short Parliament. He was re-elected for Newport in November 1640 for the Long Parliament and held the seat until he was excluded under Pride's Purge in 1648. He was High Sheriff of Hampshire in 1658.

After the Restoration in 1660, Worsley was elected MP for Newtown and held the seat until his death in 1666.

Worsley died at Compton Hampshire at the age of 53.

Worsley married Bridget Wallop, daughter of Sir Henry Wallop in 1634. His son Robert succeeded to the baronetcy.

Parliament of England
Parliament suspended since 1629	Member of Parliament for Newport (Isle of Wight); 1640–1648; With: The Viscount Falkland; William Stephens	Succeeded by William Stephens
Not represented in restored Rump	Member of Parliament for Newtown; 1660–1666; With: Sir John Barrington, Bt	Succeeded by Sir John Barrington, Bt; Sir Robert Worsley, Bt
Baronetage of England
Preceded by Richard Worsley	Baronet (of Appuldurcombe); 1621–1666	Succeeded by Robert Worsley
