= Robert Cotton (MP, born 1644) =

English politician

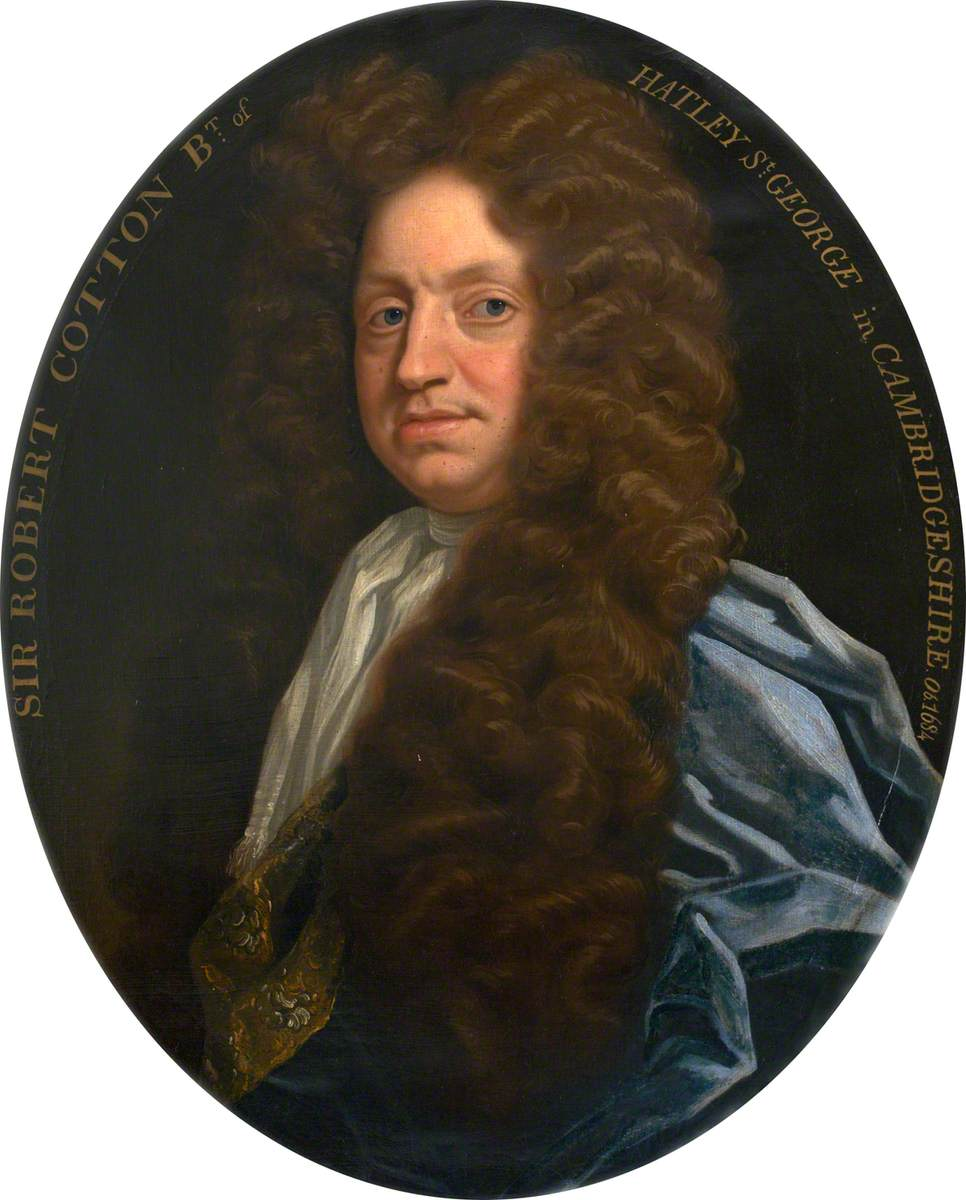
John Closterman (1660-1711) (style of) - Sir Robert Cotton of Hatley St George (1644–1717)

Sir Robert Cotton (2 May 1644 – 17 September 1717) was an English politician. He sat as a Member of Parliament from 1679 to 1701 and briefly in 1702.

== Life ==
He was the third son of Sir Thomas Cotton, 2nd Baronet, the second son by Sir Thomas's second wife Alice. He was granted the manor of Hatley, Cambridgeshire by his half-brother in 1662, the year of his father's death.

He sat as a Member of Parliament for Cambridgeshire from 1679 to 1695, for Newport, Isle of Wight from 1695 to 1701 and briefly for Truro in 1702. He was selected as High Sheriff of Cambridgeshire and Huntingdonshire for Jan–Nov 1688.

A Tory, he was one of the joint holders of the Postmaster General position from 1691, after the dismissal of John Wildman, until he retired in 1708.

Parliament of England
Preceded by Gerard Russell; Edward Partherich	Member of Parliament for Cambridgeshire; 1679–1695; With: Sir Levinus Bennet, Bt 1679–1693; The Lord Cutts 1693–1695	Succeeded by The Lord Cutts; Edward Russell
Preceded by Sir William Stephens; Richard Leveson	Member of Parliament for Newport (Isle of Wight); 1695–1701; With: The Lord Cutts 1695 & 1698–1699; Sir Henry Dutton Colt, Bt 1695–1698; Henry Greenhill 1699–1701	Succeeded by The Lord Cutts; Samuel Shepheard
Preceded by Henry Vincent; Sir William Scawen	Member of Parliament for Truro; 1702; With: Henry Vincent	Succeeded by Henry Vincent; Sir Thomas Powys
