= Henry Greenhill =

British mariner, commissioner of the navy and Member of Parliament

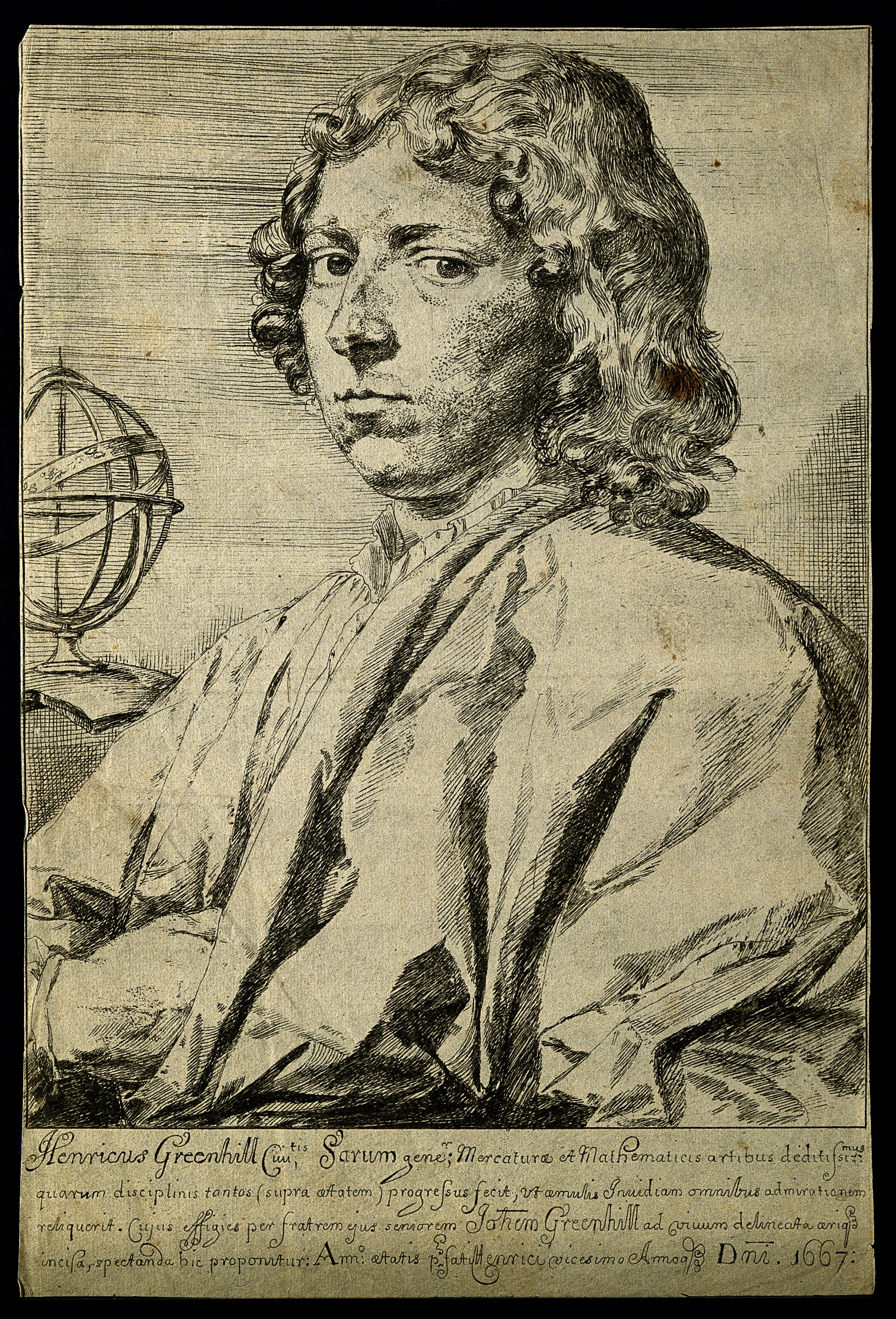
- Portrait of Henry Greenhill by his brother, John Greenhill (Wellcome Collection)
- Born: 21 June 1646; Salisbury, Wiltshire
- Died: 24 May 1708 (aged 61)

Henry Greenhill (21 June 1646 – 24 May 1708) was a British mariner, Governor of the Gold Coast, commissioner of the navy and Member of Parliament.

== Early life ==
Greenhill was a son of John Greenhill, registrar of the diocese of Salisbury, and Penelope Champneys, daughter of Richard Champneys of Orchardleigh, Somerset. His father was connected through his brothers with the East India trade. His grandfather was Henry Greenhill of Steeple Ashton in Wiltshire. His elder brother was the painter John Greenhill.

The young Greenhill received an education in grammar and music at Salisbury Cathedral School.

== Career ==
After leaving school, Greenhill went to sea. He distinguished himself in the merchant service in the West Indies and was rewarded by the Admiralty. He was appointed Governor of the Gold Coast by the Royal African Company. In 1685 he was elected an elder brother of Trinity House, in 1689 a commissioner of the Transport Office, and in 1691 one of the principal commissioners of the navy, based at Plymouth and then at Portsmouth. The building of Plymouth Dockyard was completed under his direction. He received a mourning ring under Samuel Pepys's will.

Greenhill was a Member of Parliament for Newport, Isle of Wight, from 1699 to January 1701 and again from March to November 1701.

== See also ==
- HMNB Devonport

Parliament of England
| Preceded by Lord Cutts; Sir Robert Cotton | Member of Parliament for Newport (Isle of Wight); 1699–1701; With: Sir Robert Cotton | Succeeded by Lord Cutts; Samuel Shepheard |
| Preceded by Lord Cutts; Samuel Shepheard | Member of Parliament for Newport (Isle of Wight); 1701; With: Samuel Shepheard | Succeeded by Lord Cutts; Edward Richards |
