= William Biggs =

British politician and hosier

William Biggs (1804 – 3 October 1881) was a British politician and hosier. He was elected as a councillor for Leicester City Council on 26 December 1835 and served as Mayor of Leicester on three occasions in 1842, 1848 and 1859. In 1852 he was elected to Parliament as the member for Newport. He resigned from Parliament on 7 January 1857 through appointment as Steward of the Chiltern Hundreds.

He was President of the Leicester Literary and Philosophical Society in 1849.

Born in Leicester in 1804, he was the younger brother of John Biggs who was also a politician and hosier. He died in Liverpool on 3 October 1881 at the age of 77.

Parliament of the United Kingdom
Preceded by Charles Wykeham Martin; William Plowden	Member of Parliament for Newport, Hants; 1852–1857; With: William Massey	Succeeded by William Massey; Robert Kennard
