= William Plowden (Conservative politician) =

English politician

William Henry Chicheley Plowden FRS (21 April 1787 – 29 March 1880) was an English politician and Conservative Member of Parliament (MP) for Newport, Isle of Wight.

Plowden was the son of Richard Plowden, and lived at Ewhurst Park, Basingstoke. He was a director of the Honourable East India Company.

He was appointed Second Superintendent of British Trade in China by King William IV on 10 December 1833 but in his absence the role passed to John Francis Davis instead.

In 1847 he was elected a Fellow of the Royal Society, his candidature certificate saying that he was "an active promoter of the Trigonometrical Surveys of India, and other scientific operations carried on by the East India Company; and generally attached to science and anxious to promote its progress".

In 1847 he was elected as Member of Parliament for Newport, Isle of Wight but only held the seat for one term.

He was married twice - firstly in 1818 to Katherine Harding, daughter of William Harding of Baraset. After her death in 1827 he was married again in 1830 to Jane Annette Campbell, daughter of Edward Campbell. Their son William Chichele Plowden was an administrator in India and also a Member of Parliament. Their granddaughter Pauline Georgiana Plowden married Henry Haversham Godwin-Austen of the Trigonometrical Survey of India.

Parliament of the United Kingdom
Preceded by Charles Wykeham Martin; William Hamilton	Member of Parliament for Newport, Hants; 1847–1852; With: Charles Wykeham Martin	Succeeded by William Nathaniel Massey; William Biggs
