= Samuel Shepheard (died 1719) =

Samuel Shepheard (c. 1648 – 4 January 1719), of St Magnus-the-Martyr, and Bishopsgate Street, London, was an English Member of Parliament for Newport 8 January to 15 April 1701 and London 1705–1708.

Shepheard was a vintner. He went into partnership with Basil Firebrace.

Shepheard was elected to the Court of Common Council of the City of London Corporation for Bridge ward, 1688–9.

Shepheard was one of the "interlopers" who organised a syndicate who in 1697 used their political links with the Whigs to set up the new East India Company. Shepheard used his connections with Charles Montagu, the Chancellor of the Exchequer, to gain royal approval of the establishment of the new corporation through the passage of the East India Company Act 1697 (9 Will. c. 44).

Parliament of England
Preceded by Sir Robert Cotton; Henry Greenhill	Member of Parliament for Newport (Isle of Wight); January - December 1701; With: Lord Cutts (Jan-March 1701); Henry Greenhill (March - Dec 1701)	Succeeded by Lord Cutts; Edward Richards
