= Henry Carey, 1st Baron Hunsdon =

English peer and courtier (1526–1596)

The Right Honourable The Lord Hunsdon KG PC
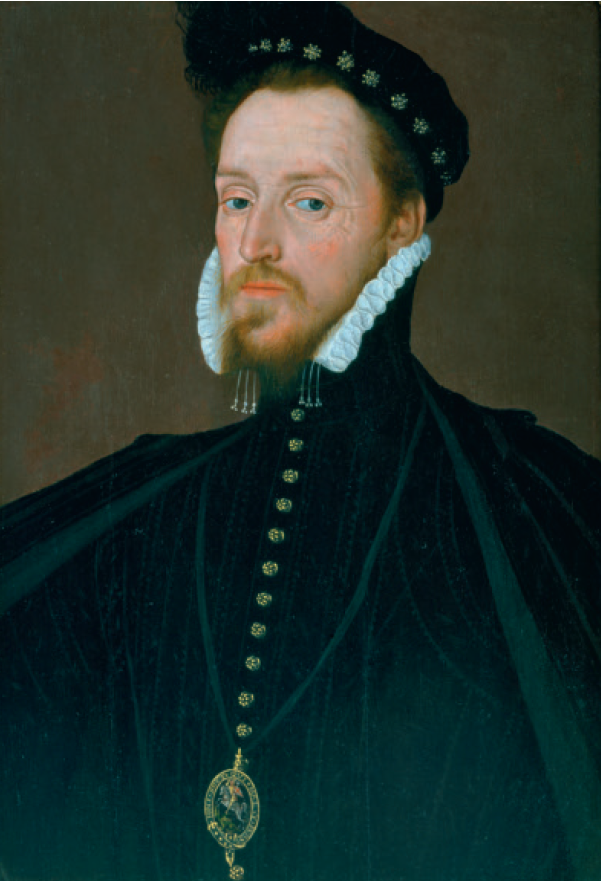
- Henry Carey, 1st Baron Hunsdon, by Steven van Herwijck, c. 1561–63. Private collection, on loan to the Globe Theatre.

Justice in Eyre South of the Trent
- In office 1589–1596
- Preceded by: The Earl of Leicester
- Succeeded by: The Lord Howard of Effingham

Personal details
- Born: 4 March 1526
- Died: 23 July 1596 (aged 70) Somerset House, London, England
- Spouse: Anne Morgan
- Children: George Carey, 2nd Baron Hunsdon; John Carey, 3rd Baron Hunsdon; Robert Carey, 1st Earl of Monmouth; Edmund Carey; Catherine Carey, Countess of Nottingham; Philadelphia Carey, Lady Scrope; Others
- Parent(s): William Carey or Henry VIII; Mary Boleyn

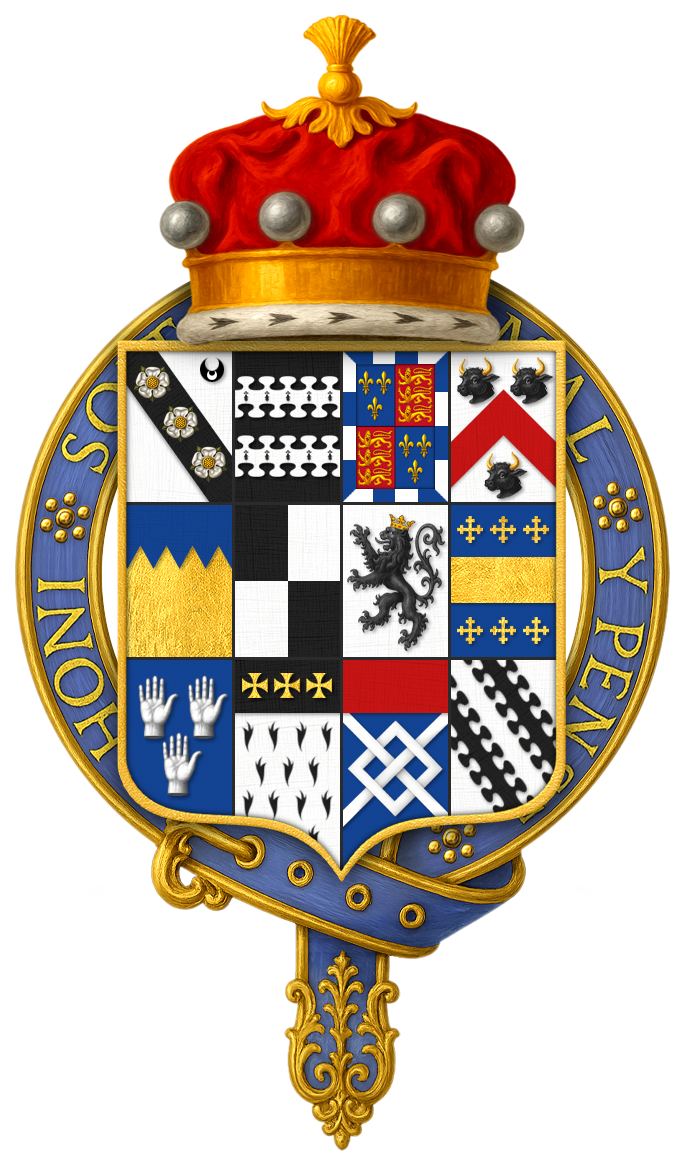
Quartered Arms of Sir Henry Carey, 1st Baron Hunsdon, as displayed on his Order of the Garter stallplate in St. George's Chapel (S7/5)

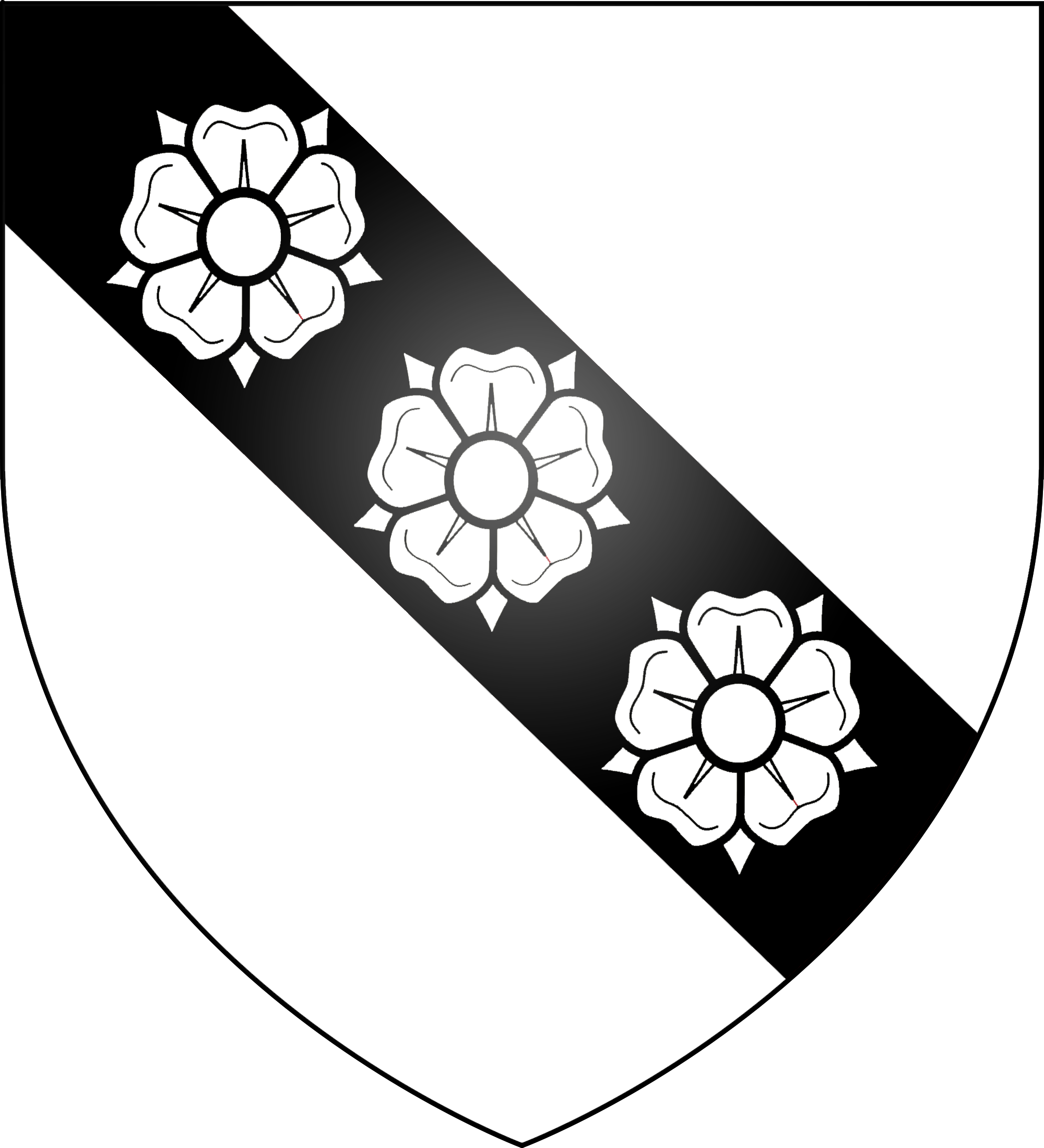
Arms of Cary: Argent, on a bend sable three roses of the field

Henry Carey, 1st Baron Hunsdon (4 March 1526 – 23 July 1596) was an English peer and courtier. He was the patron of the Lord Chamberlain's Men, William Shakespeare's playing company. The son of Mary Boleyn, he was a cousin of Elizabeth I.

== Early life ==
Henry Carey was the second child of William Carey and Mary Boleyn, who was the sister of Anne Boleyn, the second wife and Queen of Henry VIII. Carey and his elder sister Catherine came under the wardship of their maternal aunt, Anne Boleyn, who was engaged to Henry VIII at the time. The children still had active contact with their mother, who remained on good terms with her sister, until Mary's secret elopement with a soldier, William Stafford (later Lord of Chebsey), in 1535.

Anne Boleyn acted as her nephew's patron and provided him with an excellent education at a prestigious Cistercian monastery. He was also tutored at some point by the French poet Nicholas Bourbon, whose life had been saved from the French Inquisition after Queen Anne Boleyn's intervention.

Carey's royal aunt was beheaded in May 1536, when he was ten years old. His mother died seven years later, in 1543, on her estate in Essex. On 21 May 1545, he married Anne Morgan, daughter of Sir Thomas Morgan, of Arkestone, Herefordshire, and Anne Elizabeth Whitney.

== Royal appointments ==
Carey served twice as Member of Parliament, representing Buckingham during 1547–1550—entering when he was 21—and 1554–1555. He was knighted in November 1558 and created Baron by his first cousin Elizabeth I on 13 January 1559. His sister, Catherine, was one of Elizabeth's favourite ladies-in-waiting and the Queen was very generous to her Carey relatives.

Carey's Baronial estate consisted of the manors of Hunsdon and Eastwick, Hertfordshire and possessions in Kent. Hunsdon had previously belonged to Elizabeth's predecessor Mary I. Carey was also granted an annual pension of £400. On 31 October 1560 he was appointed master of the queen's hawks with a salary of £40 a year. On 20 April 1561, Carey also became a Knight of the Garter.

In 1564, Elizabeth appointed Carey Captain of the Gentlemen Pensioners, a position making him effectively her personal bodyguard for four years. He accompanied her to Cambridge University in 1564, for which he was awarded an MA. On 25 August 1568, Carey was appointed Governor of Berwick-upon-Tweed, Northumberland.

== Trouble on the border ==
Carey and William Drury heard that trouble on the Scottish borders was caused by Dan Carr or Ker of Shilstoke-Bray, who was said to have visited Mary, Queen of Scots, at Carlisle Castle. She was supposed to have encouraged Carr to make trouble in Teviotdale, Liddesdale, and the West borders, and to spread seditious literature to make difficulties for Regent Moray, who now ruled Scotland. Carey set men to watch for him, and Carr was eventually captured by Walter Ker of Cessford. Mary told Carey's son, George Carey, that the unrest was caused by her enemies, who hoped for English reprisals against her supporters.

== Northern Rebellion ==
The year 1569 was the beginning of the Rising of the North (November 1569 – February 1570), a major uprising instigated by Thomas Howard, 4th Duke of Norfolk, Charles Neville, 6th Earl of Westmorland and Thomas Percy, 7th Earl of Northumberland. The rebellion expected the support of the Roman Catholic Pope Pius V.

Carey was appointed Lieutenant General of the forces loyal to the Queen. His February victory over Sir Leonard Dacre near Gelt Bridge between Naworth and Carlisle was instrumental in crushing the rebellion. Nearly three thousand rebels ambushed Carey's party of half that size, but Carey was nonetheless victorious in fending off the assault.

A number of the rebels crossed the border to Scotland but were there targeted by the forces of the Scottish leader, Regent Lennox. Carey could still appreciate the courage of Dacre's soldiers. In his letter to the Queen detailing the victory, he made mention of the rebel charge "the bravest charge that ever I saw!". He was rewarded with a personal note of thanks from Queen Elizabeth I that read in part:

"I doubt much, my Harry, whether that the victory were given me, more joyed me, or that you were by God appointed the instrument of my glory; and I assure you that for my country's good, the first must suffice, but for my heart's contention the second pleased me . . you have done much for honour . . Your loving kinswoman, Elizabeth R."

The victorious Carey was appointed Warden of the Eastern March and represented the Queen in signing a treaty with Regent Mar on 23 October 1571. He was made keeper of Somerset House and its gardens on the Strand on 31 July 1574. He was then named a Privy Counsellor in 1577. On 16 January 1581, Carey was appointed Captain-General of the forces responsible for the safety of English borders. He was appointed Lord Chamberlain of the Household in July 1585 and would hold this position until his death. This did not prevent Elizabeth from appointing him Lord Chamberlain Lieutenant, Principal Captain and Governor of the army "for the defence and surety of our own Royal Person". The appointment occurred on 20 July 1588 in Tilbury.

Carey also served as Chief Justice in Eyre, south of the River Trent between 1589 and his death. He was Joined Commissioner of the Office Earl Marshal and High Steward of Ipswich and Doncaster. He served as Chief Justice of the Royal Forces between 20 December 1591 and his death. On 2 March 1592 Carey was appointed High Steward of Oxford for life.

== Affair with Emilia Lanier ==
In 1587, Carey began an affair with Emilia Lanier (1569–1645), who was the daughter of a Venetian-born court musician. Carey, 45 years older than Lanier, was Elizabeth's Lord Chamberlain at the time of their affair and a patron of the arts and theatre (he was the patron of Shakespeare's theatre company, known as the Lord Chamberlain's Men, but not until two years after their affair was over).

Records indicate that Carey gave Lanier a pension of £40 a year. Lanier apparently enjoyed her time as Carey's mistress. An entry from Simon Forman's diary reads "[Lanier] hath bin married 4 years/ The old Lord Chamberlain kept her longue She was maintained in great pomp... she hath 40£ a yere & was welthy to him that married her in monie & Jewells". In 1592, when she was 23, Lanier became pregnant with Carey's child. Carey paid her off with a sum of money and then married her off to her first cousin once removed, Alfonso Lanier, a Queen's musician. Church records show the two were married in St. Botolph's church, Aldgate, on 18 October 1592. In 1593, Lanier gave birth to Carey's son, Henry, presumably named after his father.

== Death ==
Carey died at Somerset House, Strand on 23 July 1596 and was buried on 12 August 1596 at Westminster Abbey. On his deathbed he refused his cousin Elizabeth I's offer to make him Earl of Wiltshire, saying: "Madam, as you did not count me worthy of this honour in life, then I shall account myself not worthy of it in death."

Two of his sons, George, and John, successively followed him as Baron Hunsdon.

== Relation to Henry VIII ==
Carey's mother, Mary Boleyn, was mistress to King Henry VIII from 1520. The exact dates when the affair started and ended are unknown, although it is believed to have ended by the time Carey was born on 4 March 1526.

Contemporary rumours stated that Carey was an illegitimate child of Henry VIII. Some ten years after the Carey was born, John Hales, vicar of Isleworth, remarked that he had met a "young Master Carey", whom some monks believed to be the king's son. However, as Eric Ives has pointed out, the vicar was hostile towards the Boleyn family and may just have been causing trouble. The idea that Carey was Henry VIII's secret son has inspired modern historical fiction, such as the novel The Other Boleyn Girl. Alison Weir in her biography of Mary Boleyn concluded that the preponderance of evidence points to Henry Carey's sister, Catherine Carey, as being the only offspring of Mary's relations with Henry VIII.

== Issue ==
Carey and Anne Morgan's marriage resulted in the birth of thirteen children:

- Sir George Carey, 2nd Baron Hunsdon (1547 – 8 September 1603). He was married on 29 December 1574 to Elizabeth Spencer, daughter of Sir John Spencer, Member of Parliament representing Northamptonshire, and Katherine Kitson.
- Michael Carey (1550–1581)
- Catherine Carey (c. 1550 – 25 February 1603). She was wife of Charles Howard, 1st Earl of Nottingham.
- Sir John Carey, 3rd Baron Hunsdon (c. 1551 – April 1617). He was married on 20 December 1576 to Mary Hyde, daughter of Leonard Hyde of Throcking, Hertfordshire. They were parents of Henry Carey, 1st Earl of Dover.
- William Carey (1552–1552)
- William Carey (1 July 1553 – 1593)
- Thomas Carey. (1555–1556), died in infancy.
- Thomas Carey. (11 October 1556) Still active in 1587.
- Sir Edmund Carey (c. 1558 – 1637). He was married three times: first to Mary Crocker, second to Elizabeth Neville and third to Judith Humphrey. He was father of a younger Sir Robert Carey but it is not certain which wife gave birth to him.
- Robert Carey, 1st Earl of Monmouth (1560 – 12 April 1639). He was married on 20 August 1593 to Elizabeth Trevannion, daughter of Sir Hugh Trevannion and Sybilla Morgan. They were parents of Henry Carey, 2nd Earl of Monmouth.
- Henry Carey (? – 1599). MP for Berwick and Buckingham.
- Philadelphia Carey (December 1563 – 1629), who married Thomas Scrope, 10th Baron Scrope and was mother of Emanuel Scrope, 1st Earl of Sunderland.
- Margaret Carey (30 November 1564 – 30 November 1605). She was married to Sir Edward Hoby, son of Thomas Hoby and Elizabeth Cooke.

In addition, Carey had several illegitimate children, including Valentine Cary (c.1570–1626), who became a clergyman, and ultimately Bishop of Exeter.

== Notes ==
Political offices
| Preceded by The Earl of Sussex | Captain of the Gentlemen Pensioners; 1564–1596 | Succeeded by The Lord Hunsdon |
| Preceded by The Earl of Sussex | Lord Chamberlain; 1585–1596 | Succeeded by The Lord Cobham |
| Unknown | Lord Lieutenant of Norfolk; 1585–1596 | Vacant Title next held by The Earl of Northampton |
| Vacant Title last held by The Earl of Sussex | Lord Lieutenant of Suffolk; 1585–1596 | Vacant Title next held by The Earl of Suffolk |
Legal offices
| Preceded by The Earl of Leicester | Justice in Eyre south of the Trent; 1589–1596 | Succeeded by The Lord Howard of Effingham |
Peerage of England
| New creation | Baron Hunsdon; 1559–1596 | Succeeded by George Carey |
