= Spencer Perceval (junior) =

British Member of Parliament

Spencer Perceval (11 September 1795 – 16 September 1859) was a British Member of Parliament, the eldest son of Prime Minister Spencer Perceval and Jane Wilson. He was also one of the twelve apostles recognized by the movement associated with Edward Irving and known as the Catholic Apostolic Church.

Perceval was educated at Harrow School and Trinity College, Cambridge. Aged 16 when his father was assassinated in May 1812, he was compensated to the point of becoming, in Lord Teignmouth's words, "the spoiled child of the nation": he was granted free legal training by Lincoln's Inn, a £1,000 annuity by Parliament, and was appointed a Teller of the Exchequer in February 1813.

He served as MP for Ennis (1827–28), Newport (1827–31), and Tiverton (1831–32).

Perceval married Anna Eliza Macleod, and had several children. One daughter, Eleanor Irving Perceval (d. 1879), married Sir Alexander Matheson, 1st Baronet. One of his grandsons was Sir Edward Marsh.

Another of his children, John Spencer Perceval, served as a lieutenant in the 1st Waikato Regiment during the Waikato War in New Zealand. He was killed in action during the skirmish at Titi Hill, near Mauku. After he fell, several of his men attempted to move him from the field, but he would not allow this and told the men to "Leave me alone; revenge my death."

Parliament of the United Kingdom
Preceded by William FitzGerald	Member of Parliament for Ennis; 1818–1820	Succeeded by Sir Ross Mahon
Preceded by William Henry John Scott; William Lamb	Member of Parliament for Newport; 1827–1831; With: William Henry John Scott 1827–1830; Horace Twiss 1830–1831	Succeeded by William Mount; James Hope-Vere
Preceded by Viscount Sandon; Granville Ryder	Member of Parliament for Tiverton; 1831–1832; With: Granville Ryder	Succeeded by John Heathcoat; James Kennedy
Political offices
Preceded by The Marquess of Buckingham	Teller of the Exchequer; 1813–1834	Office abolished
Military offices
Preceded by Sir George Clerk, Bt	Clerk of the Ordnance; 1828–1830	Succeeded by Charles Tennyson
