= Sir Richard Worsley, 1st Baronet =

English landowner and politician

Sir Richard Worsley, 1st Baronet (c. 1589 – 27 June 1621), was an English landowner and politician who sat in the House of Commons between 1614 and 1621.

Worsley was the son of Thomas Worsley, of Appuldurcombe, Isle of Wight, and his wife Barbara St John, daughter of William St John, of Farley, Hampshire. In 1604, he succeeded to the family estate on the death of his father. He matriculated at Magdalen College, Oxford, on 10 May 1605, aged 16. He was knighted at Whitehall on 8 February 1611 and was created a baronet, of Appuldurcombe, on 29 June 1611.

In 1614, Worsley was elected Member of Parliament for Newport (Isle of Wight). He was High Sheriff of Hampshire from 1616 to 1617. In 1621 he was re-elected MP for Newport and sat until his death in June 1621.

Worsley died at the age of about 32 and was buried at Godshill, Isle of Wight.

Worsley married Frances Neville daughter of Sir Henry Neville, of Billingbeare, Berkshire, in about 1610. He was succeeded in the baronetcy by his son Henry. His daughter Elizabeth married Sir John Meux, 1st Baronet.

Parliament of England
Preceded by Richard James; John Ashdell	Member of Parliament for Newport (Isle of Wight); 1614–1621; With: John Searle 1614; Sir William Uvedale 1621	Succeeded by Sir William Uvedale; Philip Fleming
Baronetage of England
New creation	Baronet (of Appuldurcombe); 1611–1621	Succeeded by Henry Worsley
