= John Greenhill =

English painter (c. 1644 – 1676)

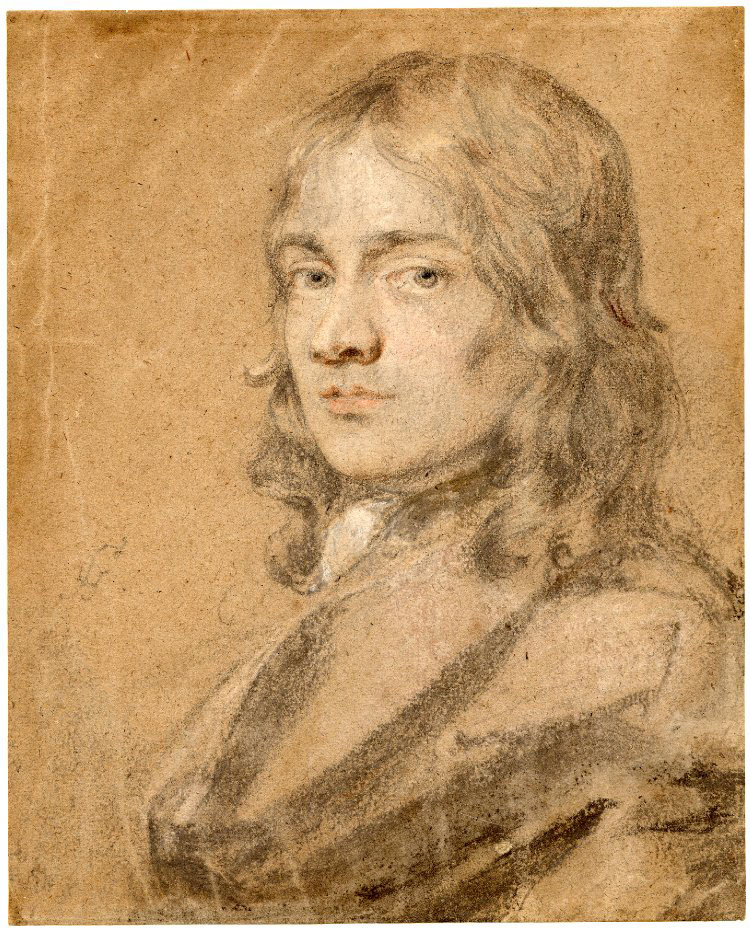
Self-portrait, 1660s–1676

John Greenhill (c. 1644 – 19 May 1676) was an English portrait painter, a pupil of Peter Lely, who approached his teacher in artistic excellence, but whose life was cut short by a dissolute lifestyle.

== Life and work ==
Greenhill was born at Salisbury, Wiltshire, around 1644, the eldest son of John Greenhill, registrar of the diocese of Salisbury, and Penelope Champneys, daughter of Richard Champneys of Orchardleigh, Somerset. His father was connected through his brothers with the East India trade. John's younger brother, Henry, became Governor of the Gold Coast and a commissioner of the Navy.

Greenhill was educated at Salisbury Cathedral School. His first attempt at a portrait was one of his paternal uncle James Abbott of Salisbury, whom he is said to have sketched surreptitiously, as the old man would not sit for him. In 1662, he moved to London and became a pupil of Peter Lely. His progress was rapid, and he acquired some of Lely's skill and method. He carefully studied Vandyck's portraits. George Vertue commented that he copied Vandyck's portrait of "Thomas Killigrew and his dog" so closely that it was difficult to know which was the original. Vertue also says that his progress excited Lely's jealousy.

Greenhill was at first industrious and married early. But a taste for poetry and drama, and living in Covent Garden near the theatres, led him to associate with many members of the free-living theatrical world, and he fell into "irregular habits." On 19 May 1676, while returning from the Vine Tavern (in Holborn) in a state of intoxication, he fell into the gutter in Long Acre and was carried to his lodgings in Lincoln's Inn Fields, where he died the same night. He was buried in St Giles in the Fields church. He left a widow and family, to whom Lely gave an annuity.

Among Greenhill's admirers was dramatist Aphra Behn, who kept up an amorous correspondence with him and lamented his early death in a fulsome panegyric.

== Portraits ==
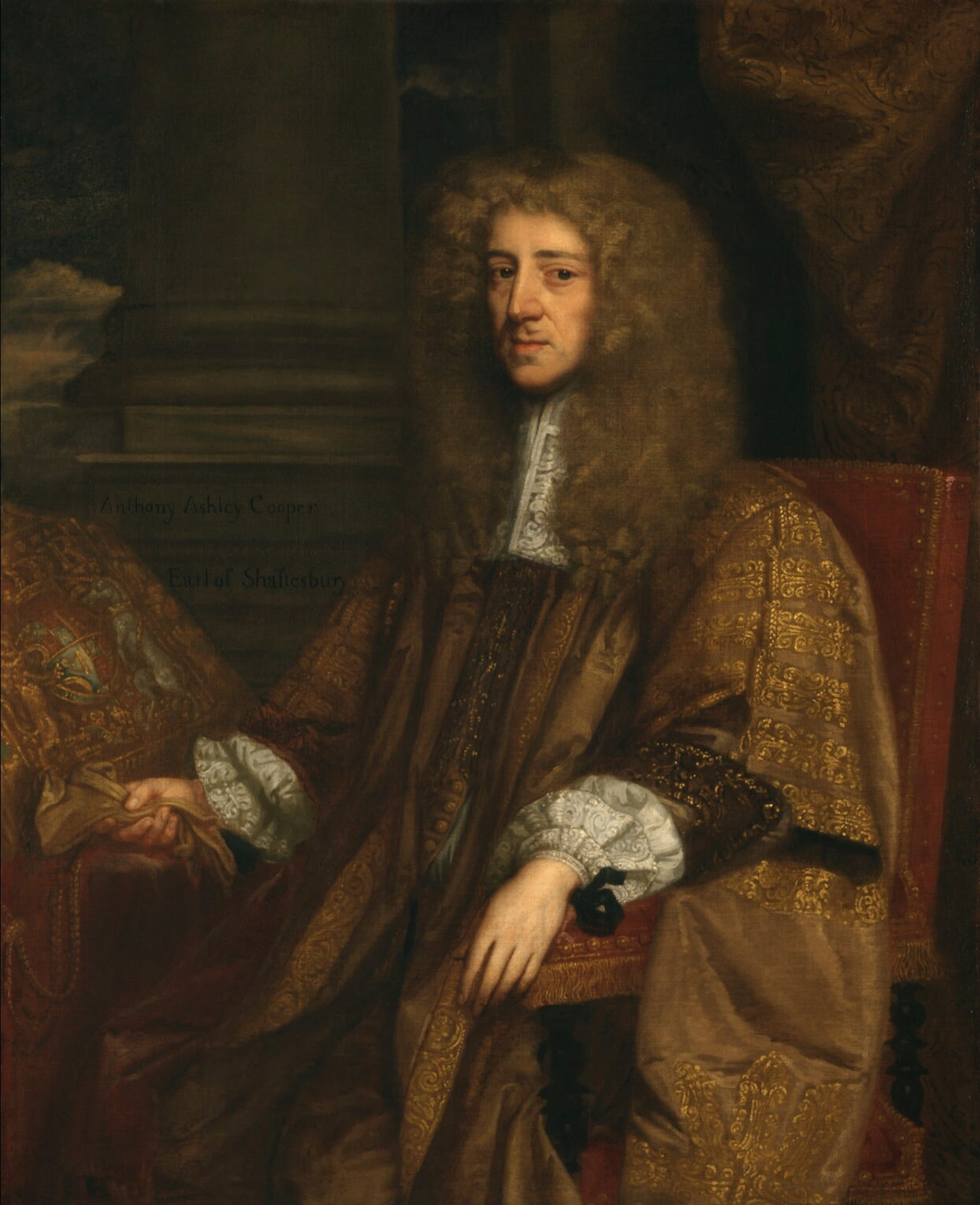
Portrait of Anthony Ashley Cooper, 1st Earl of Shaftesbury (1672–73)

Greenhill's portraits are of great merit, often approaching those of Lely in excellence. Among his chief sitters were Bishop Seth Ward, in the Guildhall at Salisbury, painted in 1673; Anthony Ashley Cooper, 1st Earl of Shaftesbury, painted more than once during his chancellorship in 1672 (engraved by Abraham Blooteling); John Locke, who wrote some verses in Greenhill's praise (engraved by Pieter van Gunst); Sir William D'Avenant (engraved by William Faithorne); Philip Woolrich (engraved in mezzotint by Francis Place); poet Abraham Cowley, Admiral Edward Spragge and others.

Greenhill painted a self-portrait, now hanging in the Dulwich Picture Gallery in London (engraved in Wornum's edition of Horace Walpole's "Anecdotes of Painting"). He also drew a portrait of himself, as did Lely.

== Sources ==
- Jeffree, Richard (2003). "Greenhill, John". Grove Art Online.
