= Anne Morgan, Baroness Hunsdon =

English noblewoman (c. 1529–1607)

Anne Morgan
- Baroness Hunsdon
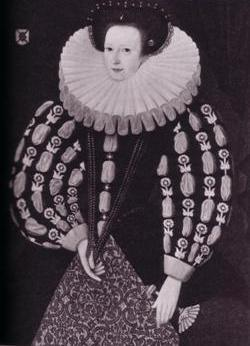
- Portrait of Anne Morgan, Baroness Hunsdon, painted by a follower of George Gower. It is displayed at Hatfield House
- Born: c.1529 Arkestone, Herefordshire, England
- Died: 19 January 1607 (aged 77–78)
- Buried: Westminster Abbey, London
- Spouse: Henry Carey, 1st Baron Hunsdon
- Issue Among others: George Carey, 2nd Baron Hunsdon; John Carey, 3rd Baron Hunsdon; Robert Carey, 1st Earl of Monmouth; Edmund Carey; Katherine Carey, Countess of Nottingham; Philadelphia Carey, Lady Scrope
- Father: Sir Thomas Morgan
- Mother: Anne Elizabeth Whitney
- Occupation: Lady of the Privy Chamber; Keeper of Somerset House

Anne Morgan, Baroness Hunsdon (c. 1529 – 19 January 1607) was an English official. She was the wife of Henry Carey, 1st Baron Hunsdon, by whom she had a total of 13 children. On 14 December 1595, she was appointed by Queen Elizabeth I of England to the office of Keeper of Somerset House; a post which she held for life. She also served the Queen as a Lady of the Privy Chamber.

== Family ==
Anne was born c. 1529 at Arkestone, Herefordshire, the daughter of Sir Thomas Morgan and Anne Elizabeth Whitney, herself the daughter of Sir James Whitney and Blanche Milbourne. The Morgan family was of Welsh origin.

== Marriage and issue ==
On 21 May 1545, a licence was obtained for the marriage of Anne to Henry Carey, son of Sir William Carey and Mary Boleyn, the elder sister of Queen consort Anne Boleyn. As Carey's mother had once been the mistress of King Henry VIII, many people, including John Hales, vicar of Isleworth, speculated that he was in point of fact, the King's illegitimate son.

Carey was created Baron Hunsdon on 13 January 1559; from that time onward, Anne was styled Baroness Hunsdon. Following her elevation to the rank of a peer's wife, Anne was appointed a Lady of the Privy Chamber to Queen Elizabeth I, who was also her husband's first cousin and held the couple in high favour. Carey was soon afterward appointed Captain of the Gentlemen-at-Arms, making him in actuality, the Queen's personal bodyguard.

A painting by an unknown artist was done to commemorate a visit by the Queen to Anne and Carey at their manor, Hunsdon House in Hertfordshire in September 1571; Anne is believed to be depicted among the Queen's Ladies in the royal procession, as the foremost lady dressed in white.

Anne's portrait was painted by a follower of George Gower, and is displayed at Hatfield House.

Henry Carey and Anne Morgan's marriage resulted in the birth of thirteen children, two of whom died in infancy.

- Sir George Carey, 2nd Baron Hunsdon (1547 – 8 September 1603). He was married on 29 December 1574 to Elizabeth Spencer, daughter of Sir John Spencer, Member of Parliament representing Northamptonshire, and Katherine Kitson.
- Michael Carey (1550–1581)
- Catherine Carey (c. 1550 – 25 February 1603). She was wife to Charles Howard, 1st Earl of Nottingham.
- Sir John Carey, 3rd Baron Hunsdon (25 Dec 1551 – buried 7 Apr 1617). He was married on 20 December 1576 to Mary Hyde, daughter of Leonard Hyde of Throcking, Hertfordshire. They were parents of Henry Carey, 1st Earl of Dover.
- William Carey.(b. ?1552-)
- William Carey (1 July 1553 – 1593)
- Thomas Carey. (1555) Died in infancy.
- Thomas Carey. (11 October 1556) Presumably named after deceased brother. Still active in 1587.
- Sir Edmund Carey (c. 1558– 12 Sept 1637). He was married three times. First to Mary Crocker, second to Elizabeth Neville and third to Judith Humphrey. He was father to a younger Sir Robert Carey but it is not certain which wife gave birth to him.
- Robert Carey, 1st Earl of Monmouth (1560 – 12 April 1639). He was married on 20 August 1593 to Elizabeth Trevannion, daughter of Sir Hugh Trevannion and Sybilla Morgan. They were parents to Henry Carey, 2nd Earl of Monmouth.
- Henry Carey. (d. 1599) MP for Berwick and Buckingham.
- Philadelphia Carey, Lady Scrope (December 1563 – 1629) She was married to Thomas Scrope, 10th Baron Scrope and was mother to Emanuel Scrope, 1st Earl of Sunderland.
- Margaret Carey (30 Nov 1564 – 30 Nov 1605) She was married to Sir Edward Hoby, son of Thomas Hoby and Elizabeth Cooke

Anne's husband had several illegitimate children, including Valentine Carey. One of his mistresses was Emilia Bassano, believed by some, including A. L. Rowse to have been the inspiration for William Shakespeare's sonnet The Dark Lady, due to her black hair and dark complexion. Her son Henry, born in 1592 was possibly mothered by her, although she was 63 years old at the time of the child's birth.

== Widowhood ==
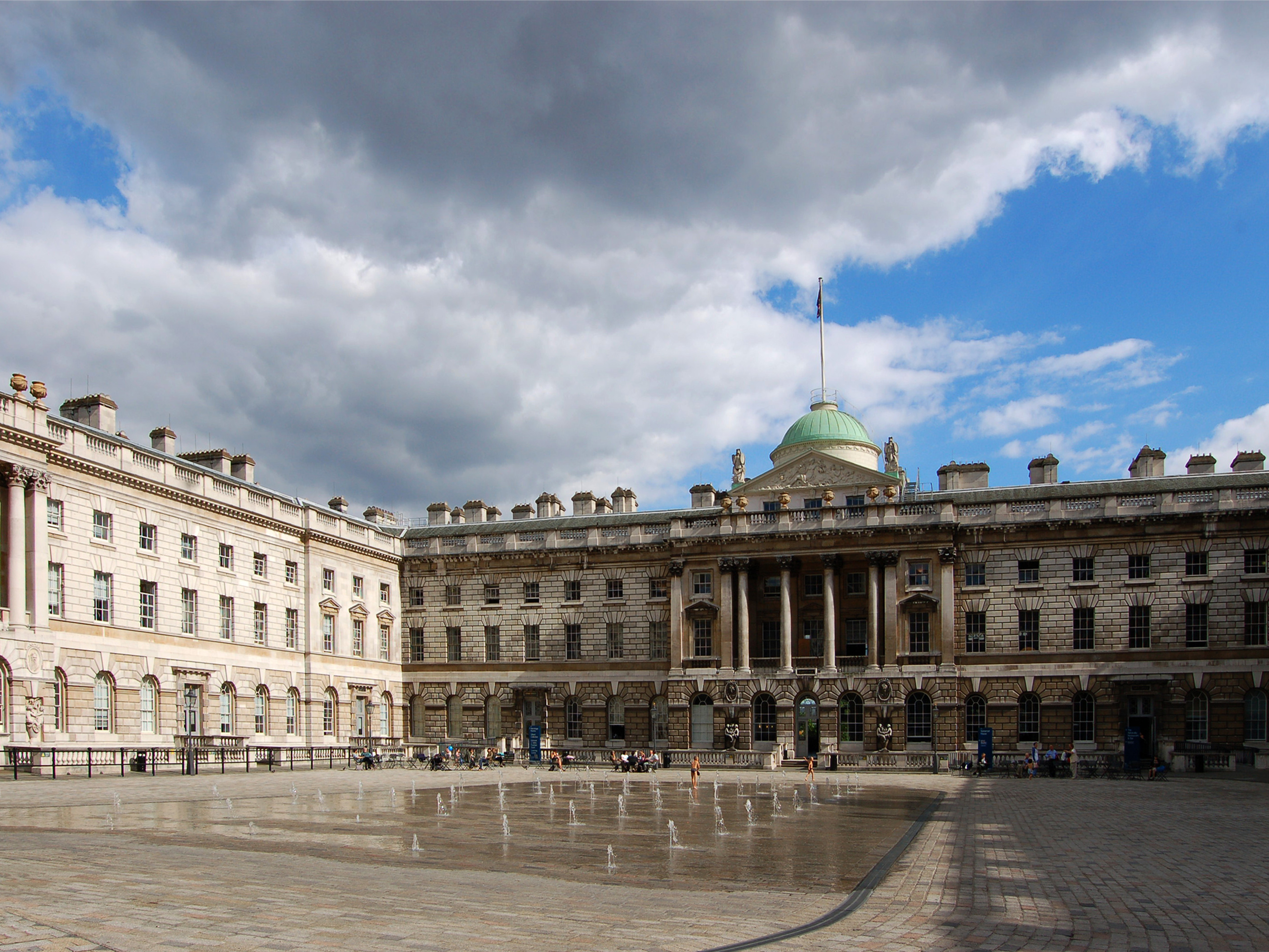
In 1595, Anne was appointed Keeper of Somerset House, a post she held for life

When Anne's husband died on 23 July 1596, he left his family in debt. Queen Elizabeth paid for his funeral expenses, and gave Anne a gift of £400, as well as an annual pension of £200 from the Exchequer. Anne used some of the money to erect a monument to her husband in Westminster Abbey.

On 14 December 1595, seven months before Carey's death, Queen Elizabeth had appointed Anne to the office of Keeper of Somerset House, a royal residence where the Queen had lived prior to her accession to the throne; Anne held the post for life. In 1574, her husband had been made Keeper.

Anne died on 19 January 1607, and was buried in Westminster Abbey. Her will, which was dated 10 January 1607, was proved on 22 January.
