= Philip Fleming (MP) =

English lawyer and politician

Philip Fleming (born c. 1587) was an English lawyer and politician who sat in the House of Commons at various times between 1614 and 1629.

Fleming was the son of Sir Thomas Fleming and his wife Mary James, the daughter of Dr Mark James. He matriculated at Christ Church, Oxford on 8 June 1604 aged 17. In 1612 he was called to the bar at Lincoln's Inn. In 1614, he was elected Member of Parliament for Lymington. He became steward of the Isle of Wight. In 1621, he was elected MP for Newport (Isle of Wight) in a by-election. He was elected MP for Newport in another by-election in 1624. He was elected MP for Newport again in 1626 and 1628 and sat until 1629 when King Charles decided to rule without parliament for eleven years.

Parliament of England
| Preceded by Thomas Marshal; Thomas South | Member of Parliament for Lymington; 1614; With: Charles Thynne | Succeeded by Sir William Doddington; Henry Crompton |
| Preceded by Sir Richard Worsley, Bt; Sir William Uvedale | Member of Parliament for Newport (Isle of Wight); 1621–1629; With: Sir William Uvedale 1621–1622; John Danvers 1624; Sir Nathaniel Rich 1625; Sir Christopher Yelverton 1626 | Parliament suspended until 1640 |
