= George Carey, 2nd Baron Hunsdon =

English noble and politician

The Right Honourable The Lord Hunsdon KG
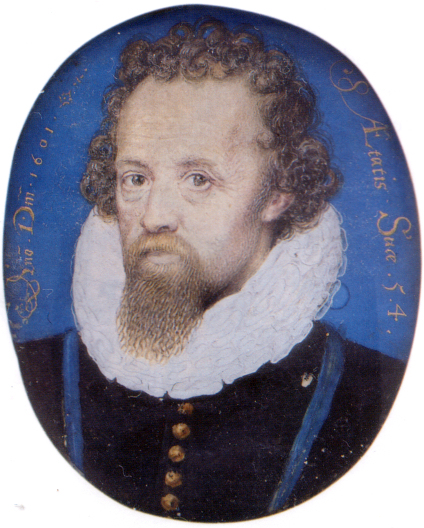
- George Carey, 2nd Baron Hunsdon, by Nicholas Hilliard, 1601

2nd Baron Hunsdon
- Reign: 1596–1603
- Predecessor: Henry Carey
- Successor: John Carey
- Born: 1547
- Died: 9 September 1603 (aged 55–56)
- Spouse: Elizabeth Spencer
- Issue: Elizabeth Carey, Lady Berkeley
- Father: Henry Carey, 1st Baron Hunsdon
- Mother: Anne Morgan

George Carey, 2nd Baron Hunsdon (1547 – 9 September 1603) was the eldest son of Henry Carey, 1st Baron Hunsdon and Anne Morgan. His father was first cousin to Elizabeth I of England. In 1560, at the age of 13, George matriculated at Trinity College, Cambridge.

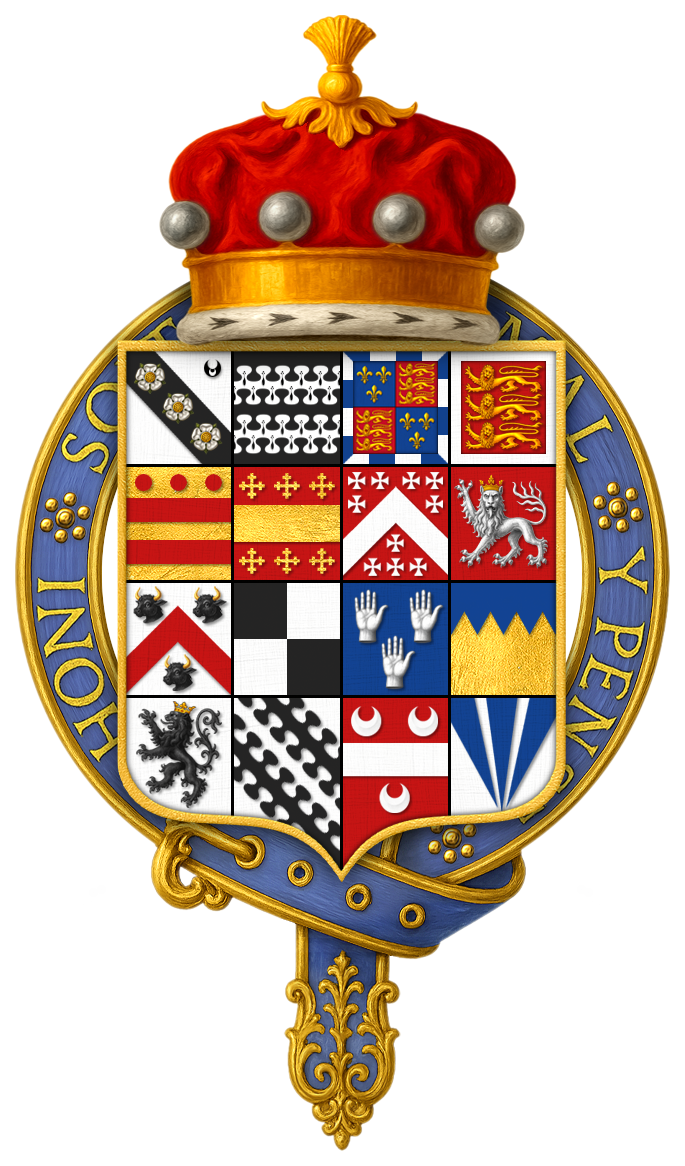
Arms of Sir George Carey, 2nd Baron Hunsdon, KG

== Military and political career ==
In December 1566 he accompanied the Earl of Bedford on an official mission to Scotland, to attend the baptism of the future King James. Mary, Queen of Scots gave him a ring and a chain with her miniature portrait.

George was sent by his father to see Mary, Queen of Scots, at Bolton Castle in August 1568. They discussed border issues connected with Lord Hunsdon's wardenry. Mary believed that her enemies made false reports against her supporters in the Scottish Borders, hoping the English authorities would make reprisals.

During the Northern Rebellion of 1569, George was knighted in the field by Thomas Radcliffe 3rd Earl of Sussex for bravery. George had challenged Lord Fleming, the commander of Dunbar Castle, to single combat.

Ivory seal matrix, c.1586, of George Carey, 2nd Baron Hunsdon, with 20 quarterings (most notably Beaufort, 3rd quarter), inscribed: SIGIL(LUM) GEO(RGII) CAREY MIL(ITIS) CAPP(ITANUS) INS(ULAE) VECTIS E(..) ADMIRALLUS COM(ITATIS) SOWTHAMTO(N) ("Seal of George Cary, Knight, Captain of the Isle of Wight and Admiral of the County of Southampton"). British Museum. (This photo a mirror image to display arms correctly, matrix designed to impress corrected image in wax)

George served as a member of Parliament in the Commons for several terms (for Hertfordshire in 1571, for Hampshire in 1584, 1586, 1589, and 1593). He was created Knight Marshal in 1578. He was given the tenure of the lands of the Cornish recusant Francis Tregian when the latter was convicted of praemunire in 1577 for aiding and abetting the missionary priest Cuthbert Mayne.

George Carey was given mining rights in Wales and on properties belonging to the Duchy of Lancaster in 1580. In September 1582, following the Raid of Ruthven, Carey was sent as ambassador to Scotland and joined Robert Bowes at the court of James VI at Stirling Castle. They were given intelligence about the French ambassador Michel de Castelnau. Carey wrote to William Cecil that correspondence between Castelnau and the Duke of Lennox would be intercepted, "lime twigs are laid to catch both their hasty messengers".

Carey went to Carisbrooke Castle on the Isle of Wight. In 1586, French diplomats complained that as Governor of the Isle he profited from goods taken from merchant ships, including velvet, satin, leather, cardamom, and ivory. He was the commander of the Isle's defenses during the Spanish Armada threat.

In July 1596, when his father died, George became the second Baron Hunsdon, and the following year he was appointed Lord Chamberlain of the Royal Household, a position which had been held by his father.

== Theatre ==
Both Henry and George Carey were patrons of the professional theatre company in London known as "the Lord Chamberlain's Men". Talents such as William Shakespeare and Richard Burbage were among the writers and performers of the company. In 1597 George was invested as a Knight of the Garter, and it is sometimes proposed that the first performance of William Shakespeare's Merry Wives of Windsor was held to commemorate the occasion.

== Family ==
George married Elizabeth Spencer (related to poet/author Edmund Spenser), who like her husband was a patron of the arts. They had one daughter, Elizabeth.

== Death ==
George Carey died on 9 September 1603 (from venereal disease and mercury poisoning), and his brother John (the next eldest) became the third Lord Hunsdon.

Carey made a will in 1599, which mentions an agate jewel depicting the legend of Perseus and Andromeda, and other jewels left to his wife. James VI and I had given him a salt and a clock set with diamonds and rubies in 1583 when he was ambassador to Scotland, and he bequeathed these items to his daughter Elizabeth Berkeley.

Political offices
Preceded by Sir Francis Walsingham	Custos Rotulorum of Hampshire; 1590–1603	Succeeded by The Earl of Southampton
Preceded by The Lord Hunsdon	Captain of the Gentlemen Pensioners; 1596–1603	Succeeded by The Earl of Northumberland
Preceded by The Marquess of Winchester; The Lord Blount	Lord Lieutenant of Hampshire jointly with The Marquess of Winchester 1597–1598; The Earl of Devonshire; 1597–1603	Succeeded by The Earl of Devonshire
Preceded by The Lord Cobham	Lord Chamberlain; 1597–1603	Succeeded by The Earl of Suffolk
Peerage of England
Preceded by Henry Carey	Baron Hunsdon; 1596–1603	Succeeded by John Carey
