= Edmund Carey =

English MP

- Born: c. 1558
- Died: 1637 (aged 78–79)
- Parents: Henry Carey, 1st Baron Hunsdon (father); Anne Morgan (mother)

Sir Edmund Carey (c. 1558 – 1637) was an English MP from 1584 to 1614.

== Life ==
He was the son of Henry Carey, 1st Baron Hunsdon, and Anne Morgan. He was the grandson of Mary Boleyn, the sister of Queen Anne Boleyn.

Carey travelled to the Netherlands with Robert Dudley, 1st Earl of Leicester, in 1585 and was present at the capture of Doesburg and in Zutphen. He was knighted by Leicester during this campaign. When he returned to England he served as Vice-Admiral of Lincolnshire for several years, and later was appointed as a colonel in his father's army for the defence of Queen Elizabeth I.

He also served for many years in the House of Commons. He was a Member of the Parliament of England for Newport, Isle of Wight in 1584 and 1589, Oxford in 1593, Buckingham in 1597, Wiltshire in 1601 and Calne in 1604 and 1614.

== Marriages and issue ==
He was married three times:

- Mary Crocker, daughter and heiress of Christopher Crocker. They had five children:
  - Sir Robert Carey (1583–1638), Capt of Horse in the Netherlands.
  - Sir Ferdinando Carey (1590–1638), married Philippa, daughter of Sir John Throckmorton. They were the parents of Philadelphia Carey, Baroness Wentworth.
  - Thomas Carey
  - Catherine Carey, married Francis Rogers
  - Anne Carey, married Sir William Uvedale
- Elizabeth Neville, daughter and co-heiress of John Nevill, 4th Baron Latimer, and Lucy Somerset. Elizabeth was the widow of Sir John Danvers.
- Judith Humphrey, daughter of Dr Lawrence Humphrey, Dean of Winchester and the President of Magdalen College, Oxford.
