= Richard Hardy (MP) =

16th-century English politician

Richard Hardy (died 1607), of Southampton, was an English politician.

He was a member (MP) of the parliament of England for Newport, Isle of Wight in 1586 and 1589.
