= William Henry Ord (1803–1838) =

British politician (1803–1838)

William Henry Ord (1803 – 9 November 1838) was a British politician, who represented Newport in Parliament from 1832 until 1837.

Ord was the only son of William Ord, a landowner who was MP for Morpeth 1802–32 and Newcastle-upon-Tyne, and his wife Mary Scott. He was educated at Eton College and Trinity College, Cambridge, where he was President of the Cambridge Union Society in 1822. He then trained as a barrister at Lincoln's Inn. In 1829, he married Frances Vere Loraine, daughter of Sir William Loraine, 4th Baronet.

Ord was elected for Newport at the 1832 general election as a Liberal, and re-elected at the 1835 general election. After the 1835 election he was made a Lord of the Treasury in the Second Melbourne ministry, with a salary of £1,200. This necessitated a ministerial by-election; Ord was returned unopposed on 27 April. It was reported that he had been earlier offered the post in June 1834 at the end of the Grey ministry, as a gesture to acknowledge his father's support, but had declined at the time as he thought it would be unlikely he could secure re-election.

During 1836, at the Treasury, he worked on the consolidation and reduction of stamp duties on newspapers and other publications; his friend Charles Knight considered the task "herculean" and wrote later that "the labour killed him". Ord stood down at dissolution in 1837 and did not contest the general election.

Ord died at his father's residence, Whitfield Hall in Northumberland, on 9 November 1838. He was aged 35.
