= Charles Wykeham Martin =

English politician (1801–1870)

Charles Wykeham Martin DL (11 September 1801 – 30 October 1870) was a British politician who sat in the House of Commons in three periods between 1841 and 1870.

== Biography ==
Martin was born Charles Wykeham the son of Fiennes Wykeham of Leeds Castle Maidstone and his wife Eliza Bignell, daughter of Richard Bignell. He was educated at Eton College and at Balliol College, Oxford. In 1821 his father assumed the additional name of Martin. He was a Fellow of the Royal Society of Antiquaries, a corresponding member of the Academy d'Archeologie de Belgique, and a Fellow of the Royal Statistical Society. He was also a lieutenant-colonel of the 3rd Battalion Kent Volunteers and a Deputy Lieutenant and J.P. for Kent and a J.P. for Hampshire.

Martin stood for parliament unsuccessfully at Newport (Isle of Wight) in 1837 but was elected Member of Parliament for Newport in 1841. He lost the seat at Newport in 1852 and stood unsuccessfully at Maidstone in 1853. He was elected MP for West Kent at a by-election in 1857 as a Liberal, but lost the seat in 1859. At the 1865 general election he was elected MP for Newport again, and re-elected in 1868 when representation was reduced to one member. He held the seat until his death in 1870.

Martin died at the age of 69 at Leeds Castle on 30 October 1870.

== Family ==
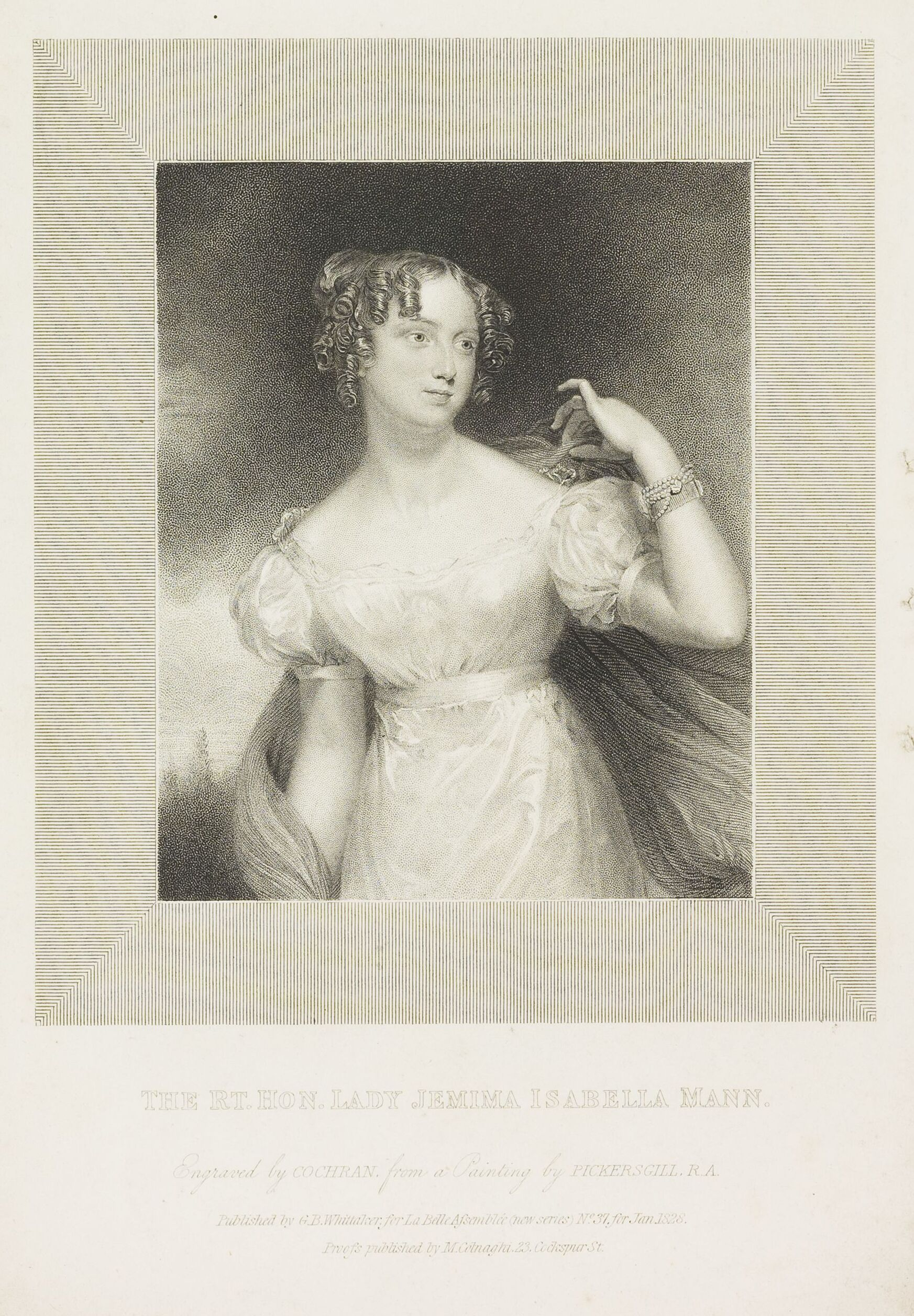
First wife: Jemima Isabella Mann

Martin married firstly in 1828, Lady Jemima Isabella Cornwallis, daughter of James Mann, 5th Earl Cornwallis. She died in 1836 and he married secondly in 1838, Matilda Trollope daughter of Sir John Trollope, 6th Baronet. His son Philip was MP for Rochester. His second son Fiennes took the surname Cornwallis in 1859 by Royal licence in accordance with an inheritance from Caroline Cornwallis.

Charles Wykeham Martin is the grandfather of Fiennes Cornwallis, 1st Baron Cornwallis, the great-grandfather of Wykeham Cornwallis, 2nd Baron Cornwallis, and the great-great grandfather of Fiennes Neil Wykeham Cornwallis, 3rd Baron Cornwallis.

== Works ==
- Martin, Charles Wykeham (1869). The History and Description of Leeds Castle, Kent. Westminster: Nichols and Sons. Archived from the original on 8 February 2023 – via Google Books.

Parliament of the United Kingdom
Preceded by John Hawkins; William John Blake	Member of Parliament for Newport; 1841–1852; With: William Hamilton to 1847; William Plowden from 1847	Succeeded by William Biggs; William Massey
Preceded by Sir Edmund Filmer, Bt; William Masters Smith	Member of Parliament for West Kent; 1857–1859; With: William Masters Smith; James Whatman	Succeeded by Viscount Holmesdale; Sir Edmund Filmer, Bt
