= Charles Edward Mangles =

English businessman and Member of Parliament

Charles Edward Mangles (1798–1874) was an English businessman and Member of Parliament.

== Life ==
Mangles was a son of James Mangles. He was employed as a naval officer by the East India Company, a midshipman in 1811, becoming a commander in 1827 on the Marchioness of Ely. In 1831 he left the service of the East India Company, in order to marry, and joined his elder brother Frederick, who had taken over their father's business, as a partner. In the following decade Mangles & Co. became an East India agency. The private bank Mangles, Keen & Co. was operating in Epsom in 1838.

Mangles acquired the Poyle Park estate near Farnham, Surrey, by purchase, under the terms of the will of his father. He was an unsuccessful parliamentary candidate for Southampton in 1841. That year, he was a director of the London and Blackwall Railway. Active in promoting the Victoria Dock for London by Act of Parliament (1850), he worked with Edward Ladd Betts, Samuel Morton Peto, and another banker, J. P. Kennard. He became chairman of Royal Mail Steam Packet in 1856. In 1857 he was elected to Parliament as member for Newport, Isle of Wight. Shortly afterwards he became chairman of the London and South Western Railway Company.

In 1864 the West Surrey private bank, C. E. Mangles & Co., dating back to 1836, was converted into the public South Eastern Banking Company; Mangles joined the new board. It expanded and changed name, taking over a Ramsgate bank, and being known as the Counties Joint Stock Bank and English Joint-Stock Bank. It did not survive the Panic of 1866, however. Charles Bradlaugh brought an action against the English Joint-Stock Bank, for unpaid commission.

== Family ==
Mangles married Rose Newcomb. James Henry Mangles the diarist was their eldest son.
