= Robert Kennard =

British politician

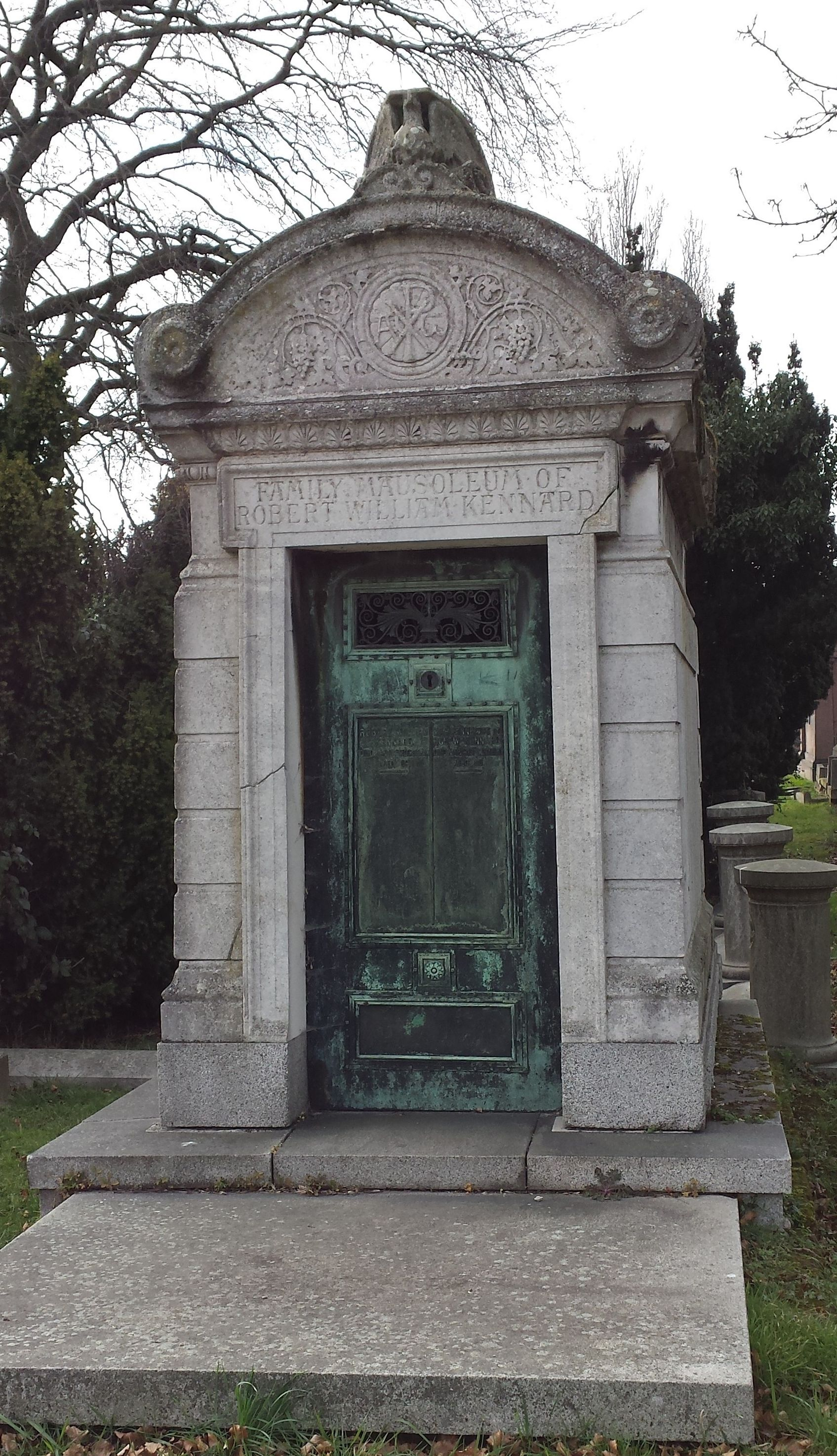
Vault of Robert Kennard at Kensal Green Cemetery

Robert William Kennard JP DL (1800–1870) was a London-born merchant, financier, entrepreneur, JP and later Member of Parliament.

The son of jeweller turn banker John Kennard (Heywood, Kennards & Co, merged into Consolidated Bank Ltd), and Harriet Elizabeth Peirse, he trained as a merchant in London. Having invested in the Falkirk Iron Company in 1830, Kennard's consortia formed the Blaenavon Coal and Iron Company in 1836, which subsequently bought the Blaenavon Ironworks. There he employed his son, the noted civil engineer Thomas Kennard, and his cousin and the later photographer George Swan Nottage.

Through his connections with the iron and steel industries, and access to large sums of money through his families banking connections, he became a significant financier during the railway boom of the 1830s, and also financed some of the government requirements during the Crimea War. Leveraging this, Kennard made his fortune as a director of several UK railway companies, and as a director of one of the largest groups promoting railroads in France and Belgium.

He held the office of Justice of the Peace for: Stirlingshire; Middlesex; and later Hertfordshire. Having held the office of Deputy Lieutenant of Monmouthshire, he was appointed Sheriff of London and Middlesex between 1846 and 1847. He was elected as an associate member of the Institution of Civil Engineers, seconded by Robert Stephenson and Sir William Cubitt. He was decorated with the award of Chevalier, Order of Leopold of Belgium.

Kennard was elected to the House of Commons as a Conservative on 11 February 1857, representing Newport (Isle of Wight) constituency. He was not reelected in the general election in March that year, but returned to Parliament in the 1859 general election, and sat until he stepped down at the 1868 general election.

Kennard married Mary Ann Challis, only child of Liberal MP and later Lord Mayor of London Thomas Challis, on 23 May 1823. Living in Theobalds Park, Hertfordshire, the couple had 10 children: Mary Jane Kennard; Charlotte Anne Kennard (died 24 Oct 1926); Ellen Kennard (died 5 Apr 1917); Reverend Robert Bruce Kennard (8 May 1824 – 10 Mar 1895); Thomas William Kennard (29 Aug 1825 – 10 Sep 1893); Arthur Challis Kennard (born 17 Jun 1831); Henry Martyn Kennard (born 17 Feb 1833); John Kennard (13 Apr 1836 – 24 Nov 1925); Howard John Kennard (29 Nov 1839 – 8 Aug 1896), co-founder of the London Stereoscopic and Photographic Company; Edward Kennard (born 22 Apr 1842).

He is interred in Kensal Green Cemetery, in Grade II listed portland stone with bronze door mausoleum.
