= Amherst (surname) =

Amherst is a surname. Notable people with the surname include:

- Baron Amherst (disambiguation), in particular:
  - Jeffery Amherst, 1st Baron Amherst (1717–1797), British army officer
  - William Amherst (British Army officer) (1732–1781), younger brother of the above
- Baron Amherst of Hackney, created 1892 for:
  - William Tyssen-Amherst, 1st Baron Amherst of Hackney
    - Alicia Amherst (1865–1941), gardening historian and daughter of the above
- Earl Amherst:
  - William Amherst, 1st Earl Amherst, Governor-General of India from August 1823 to February 1828
  - William Amherst, 2nd Earl Amherst
    - Josceline Amherst, Australian politician and fifth son of the 2nd earl
  - William Amherst, 3rd Earl Amherst
  - Hugh Amherst, 4th Earl Amherst
  - Jeffery Amherst, 5th Earl Amherst
- Elizabeth Amherst Hale (1774–1826), Canadian artist born Elizabeth Frances Amherst
