= Amherst =

Amherst may refer to:

== People ==
- Amherst (surname), including a list of people with the name
- Earl Amherst of Arracan in the East Indies, a title in the British Peerage; formerly Baron Amherst
- Baron Amherst of Hackney of the City of London, a title in the British Peerage

== Places ==
=== Australia ===
- Amherst, Victoria

=== Burma ===
- Kyaikkami, Myanmar, formerly known as Amherst

=== Canada ===
- Amherst Cove, Newfoundland and Labrador
- Middle Amherst Cove, Newfoundland and Labrador
- Upper Amherst Cove, Newfoundland and Labrador
- Amherst, Nova Scotia
- Amherst Head, Nova Scotia
- Amherst Internment Camp, Nova Scotia (1915–1919)
- Amherst Point, Nova Scotia
- Amherst Shore, Nova Scotia
- East Amherst, Nova Scotia
- West Amherst, Nova Scotia
- Amherst Island, Ontario
- Amherst Pointe, Ontario
- Amherstburg, Ontario
- Amherstview, Ontario
- Amherst, Quebec
- Saint-Rémi-d'Amherst, Quebec
- Amherst Island (Nunavut)

=== United States ===
- Amherst, Colorado
- Amherst, Maine
- Amherst, Massachusetts
- Amherst Center, Massachusetts
- Amherst Township, Fillmore County, Minnesota
- Amherst, Nebraska
- Amherst, New Hampshire, a New England town
  - Amherst (CDP), New Hampshire, the main village in the town
- Amherst, New York
- Amherst, Ohio
- Amherst Township, Lorain County, Ohio
- Amherst, South Dakota
- Amherst, Texas
- Amherst, Virginia
- Amherst County, Virginia
- Amherst (town), Wisconsin
  - Amherst, Wisconsin, a village in the town

== Education ==
- Amherst Regional Public Schools, in Amherst, Massachusetts, US
- Amherst Central High School, in Snyder, Amherst, New York State, US
- Amherst College, in Amherst, Massachusetts, US
- University of Massachusetts Amherst, in Amherst, Massachusetts, US

== Transportation ==
=== Cars ===
- Amherst (automobile), manufactured briefly in Canada

=== Stations ===
- Amherst Street station, a subway station in Buffalo, New York
- Amherst station (Massachusetts), a former station in Amherst, Massachusetts, US
- Amherst station (Nova Scotia), a station in Amherst, Nova Scotia, Canada

== Other uses ==
- Fort Amherst (disambiguation), military facilities in England and Canada
- Amherst Mountain, a summit in Colorado
- Baron Amherst (disambiguation)
- Amherst Street (disambiguation)
- Amherst Township (disambiguation)
- Operation Amherst, a WW2 Free French paratrooper operation in the Netherlands

== See also ==
- Amherst Town Hall, Amherst, Ohio, US
- Amherst West Cemetery, Amherst, Mass., US
- Port Amherst, West Virginia, US
- North Amherst, Massachusetts, US
  - North Amherst Center Historic District
- East Amherst:
  - East Amherst, New York, US
  - East Amherst, Nova Scotia, Canada
- West Amherst, Nova Scotia, Canada
- South Amherst (disambiguation)
