= Victory title =

Noble title granted to honor a commander who achieved a major military victory

A victory title is an honorific title adopted by a successful military commander to commemorate his defeat of an enemy nation. The practice is first known in Ancient Rome and is still most commonly associated with the Romans, but it was also adopted as a practice by many later empires, especially the French, British and Russian Empires.

== Roman victory titles ==
Victory titles were suffixed to the commander's name and were usually the name of the enemy defeated by the commander. Some victory titles became hereditary cognomina, while others were personal agnomina and not carried on by later family members. Names like Africanus ("the African"), Numidicus ("the Numidian"), Isauricus ("the Isaurian"), Creticus ("the Cretan"), Gothicus ("the Goth"), Germanicus ("the German") and Parthicus ("the Parthian") expressed the triumphal subjugation of these peoples or their territories, or commemorated the locations of general's successful campaigns, equivalent to modern titles like Lawrence of Arabia, and were not indicators of origin.

The practice of awarding victory titles was established in the Roman Republic. The most famous grantee of a Republican victory title was Publius Cornelius Scipio, who for his great victories in the Second Punic War, specifically the Battle of Zama was awarded by the Roman Senate the title "Africanus" and is thus known to history as "Scipio Africanus" (his adopted grandson Scipio Aemilianus Africanus was awarded the same title after the Third Punic War and is known as "Scipio Africanus the Younger"). Other notable holders of such victory titles include Quintus Caecilius Metellus Numidicus, who was replaced by Gaius Marius as command-in-chief of the Jugurthine War; Publius Servilius Vatia Isauricus, who commanded Roman anti-pirate operations in the eastern Mediterranean (and was father of Julius Caesar's colleague in his second consulate); Publius Servilius Vatia Isauricus (in 48 BC); while Marcus Antonius Creticus, another anti-piracy commander (and father of Caesar's magister equitum, Mark Antony) actually lost in Crete and was called Creticus mockingly, as it also meant "made of chalk". Marcus Porcius Cato Uticensis received his title posthumously from those glorifying his suicide, rather than defeat, at Utica.

The practice continued in the Roman Empire, although it was subsequently amended by some Roman Emperors who desired to emphasise the totality of their victories by adding Maximus ("the Greatest") to the victory title (e.g., Parthicus Maximus, "the Greatest Parthian"). This taste grew to be rather vulgar by modern standards, with increasingly grandiose accumulations of partially fictitious victory titles.

In a broader sense, the term victory title is sometimes used to describe the repeatable awarding of the invariable style of Imperator (Greek equivalent Autokrator; see those articles), which is the highest military qualification (as modern states have awarded a non-operational highest rank, sometimes instituted for a particular general), but even when it marks the recipient out for one or more memorable victories (and the other use, as a permanent military command for the ruler, became in fact the more significant one), it does not actually specify one.

== Medieval victory titles ==
After the fall of Western Rome, the practice continued in modified form.

- Charlemagne, the first Carolingian emperor of the Franks, styled himself Dominator Saxonorum ("Dominator of the Saxons") after subduing the largest pagan people of the Empire, transforming the duchy into a vassal of the Holy Roman Empire.
- Byzantine Emperor Basil II (r. 960–1025) — "the Bulgar-slayer"
- Bulgarian Tsar Kaloyan (r. 1196–1207) — "the Roman-slayer"
- King Richard I of England (r. 1189–1199) — "the Lionheart"
- King Edward I of England (r. 1272–1307) — "Hammer of the Scots"
- Ruler of Epirus Thomas Preljubović (r. 1367–1384) — "the Albanian-slayer"
- Prince Alexander Yaroslavich of Novgorod was called Alexander Nevsky for his victory in the Battle of Neva.
- Prince Dmitry of Moscow was styled Dmitry Donskoy for his victory over Mamai Khan at Kulikovo on the Don.

== Modern victory titles ==
The term "victory-title" occurs in English from as early as 1938.

Modern monarchs awarded titles in commemoration of major military victories, but in the guise of a feudal aristocratic title, often hereditary, but only in appearance: an actual fief was not required, indeed they often were granted in chief of a battlefield where the awarding monarch simply had no constitutional authority to grant anything validly under local law.

This new form was even more specific than the Roman practice. Instead of naming the enemy — which could well need to be repeated — it linked the name of a battle, which was almost always unique. A further level of protection was available by naming a nearby place, such as 'Austerlitz' which Napoleon declared sounded better than the alternative.

=== Russian Empire ===
In the Russian Empire, many victory titles originated in the period between the accession of Catherine the Great (1762) and the death of Nicholas I of Russia (1855). But as early as 1707, after Alexander Menshikov occupied Swedish Ingria (Izhora) during the Great Northern War, Peter I of Russia officially designated him Duke of Ingria (Russian: герцог Ижорский, romanized: gertsog Izhorsky). Other Russian victory titles (sometimes referencing whole campaigns rather than specific battles) include:

- 1775 — Chesmensky ("Chesmean") for Count Aleksey Orlov for his victory in the naval Battle of Chesma
- 1775 — Zadunaisky ("Transdanubian") for Count Pyotr Rumyantsev for his crossing the Danube during the Russo-Turkish War (1768–1774)
- 1775 — Krymsky ("Crimean") for Prince Vasily Mikhailovich Dolgorukov for his victories in the Crimea during the Russo-Turkish War (1768–1774)
- 1783 — His Serene Highness Prince Tavrichesky for Grigori Potemkin for his annexation of the Crimea and New Russia (the ancient Greeks called this area Taurida; see also Tauride Palace)
- 1789 — Rymniksky for Alexander Suvorov for his victory in the Battle of Rymnik (Russo-Turkish War of 1787–1792)
- 1799 — Prince Italiysky ("Italian") for Suvorov, for the Italian Campaign of 1799 after the Battle of Trebbia
- 1813 — His Serene Highness Prince Smolensky for Mikhail Kutuzov for his 1812 defeat of Napoleon at Krasnoi near Smolensk during Napoleon's invasion of Russia
- 1827 — Count Erivansky for Ivan Paskevich for his capture of Erivan (Yerevan) in Armenia during the Russo-Persian War, 1826–1828
- 1829 — Zabalkansky ("Transbalkan") for Count Ivan Dibich for having crossed the Balkan Mountains during the Russo-Turkish War, 1828–1829
- 1831 — His Serene Highness Prince Varshavsky ("Varsovian") for Paskevich for having taken Warsaw during the Polish November Uprising of 1830–1831
- 1855 — Karssky for Count Nicholas Muravyov for his capture of Kars after the Siege of Kars

Furthermore, similar titles were awarded for comparable non-military services to the empire, e.g. in 1858 — Amursky for another Nicholas Muravyov, who had negotiated a new border between Russian and China along the Amur River under the Treaty of Aigun.

General Wrangel awarded the last victory-title in Russia (Krymsky – "Crimean") unofficially after the abolition of the monarchy: to the White Lieutenant-General Yakov Aleksandrovich Slashchov in August 1920 for his defence of the Crimea in 1919–1920.

=== France ===
==== First Empire ====
Napoleon I, the founder of the Bonaparte dynasty and only head of the First French Empire, owed his success — both his personal rise and the growth of his empire — above all to his military excellence, and he bestowed elaborate honours on his generals, especially those raised to the supreme army rank of Marshal of the Empire.

The bestowing of a victory title (French: titre de victoire), commemorating a specific victory, was an ideal form of honour, and many incumbents were victorious marshals (or posthumously, in chief of the widow).

The highest of these titles referenced four nominal principalities, in most cases awarded as a "promotion" to holders of ducal victory titles:

- Marshal Davout, Prince d'Eckmühl – 1809 (extinct 1853) – also duc d'Auerstaedt (see below)
- Marshal Masséna, Prince d'Essling – 1810 – also duc de Rivoli
- Marshal Ney, Prince de la Moskowa – 1813 (extinct 1969) – also duc d'Elchingen – Bataille de la Moskowa is the French name for the Battle of Borodino of 1812
- Marshal Berthier, Prince de Wagram – 1809 (extinct 1918) – also duc de Valengin, and Prince de Neuchâtel (a sovereign title granted in 1806), neither of which were victory titles.

Next in rank came ten dukedoms:

- Marshal Ney, duc d'Elchingen – 1808 (extinct 1969) – also Prince de la Moskowa
- Marshal Lefebvre, duc de Dantzig – 28 May 1807 (extinct 1820) – Danzig was then still a city republic, which became part of Prussia after Napoleon's defeat, and subsequently Gdańsk in Poland
- General Junot, duc d'Abrantès – 1808 (extinct 1859 but extended in female line in 1869, again extinct 1985)
- Marshal Davout, duc d'Auerstaedt – 1808 (extinct 1853, extended to collaterals) – also prince d'Eckmühl
- Marshal Augereau, duc de Castiglione – 1808 (extinct 1915)
- Marshal Lannes, duc de Montebello – 1808
- Marshal Marmont, duc de Raguse – 1808 (extinct 1852) – present-day Dubrovnik, on the Croatian coast; conquered as part of Napoleon's own Italian kingdom, soon to become part of France's imperial exclave the Illyrian provinces (1809–1816)
- Marshal Masséna, duc de Rivoli – 1808 – also Prince d'Essling
- Marshal Kellermann, duc de Valmy – 1808 (extinct 1868)
- Marshal Suchet, duc d'Albufera – 1813

Counts:

- Georges Mouton, comte de Lobau – 1810

==== July Monarchy ====
- Thomas Robert Bugeaud, duc d'Isly – 1844 (from the First Franco-Moroccan War)

==== Second Empire ====
In the interest of insinuating a continuation of his uncle's empire, to prove legitimacy during his early reign, Napoleon III reestablished many titles that Napoleon I had issued during his own reign. During his long rule, Napoleon III also created new titles rewarding his generals for victory. Examples include:

- Marshal Pélissier, duc de Malakoff – 1856 (from the Crimean War, extinct 1864)
- Marshal MacMahon, duc de Magenta – 1859 (from the Campaign of Italy; a newly invented dye took its name for the same battle)
- Charles Cousin-Montauban, comte de Palikao – 1862 (from the Second Opium War)

=== British Empire ===
Many victory titles have been created in the peerages of England, Great Britain and the United Kingdom. Examples include:

- Godert de Ginkell, victor at the Battle of Aughrim, was created Baron of Aughrim as a subsidiary title of the Earldom of Athlone in 1692.
- Admiral Edward Russell, 1st Earl of Orford, victor of the Battle of Barfleur, was created Viscount Barfleur as a subsidiary title of the Earldom of Orford in 1697.
- James Stanhope, who captured Mahón during the War of the Spanish Succession, was created Viscount Stanhope of Mahon in 1717.
- Sir George Augustus Eliott, victor of the Great Siege of Gibraltar, was created Baron Heathfield of Gibraltar in 1787.
- Admiral Adam Duncan, victor of the Battle of Camperdown, was created Viscount Duncan of Camperdown in 1797. (His son was later created Earl of Camperdown.)
- Admiral Sir John Jervis, victor of the Battle of Cape St Vincent, was created Earl of St Vincent in 1797, and was further created Viscount St Vincent in 1801.
- Lieutenant-General Sir Arthur Wellesley (later the 1st Duke of Wellington), victor of the Battle of Douro, was in 1809 created Baron Douro as the subsidiary title granted to him with the Viscountcy of Wellington (see below). He was later, in 1814, created Marquess Douro as the subsidiary title granted to him with the Dukedom of Wellington.
- General Sir Robert Napier, who commanded the Abyssinian Expedition of 1868 and captured the fortress of Magdàla, was created Baron Napier of Magdala in 1868.
- Frederick Hamilton-Temple-Blackwood, 1st Earl of Dufferin, Governor-General of India during the Third Anglo-Burmese War that resulted in the annexation of Upper Burma including its former capital Ava, was created Marquess of Dufferin and Ava, in the County of Down and the Province of Burma, and Earl of Ava, in the Province of Burma in 1888.
- Field Marshal Sir Julian Byng, who played an important role in the Battle of Vimy Ridge (1917), was created Baron Byng of Vimy in 1919 and was later promoted to a viscountcy.
- Field Marshal Sir John French, the first commander of the British Expeditionary Force in the First World War, was created Earl of Ypres in 1922.
- Field Marshal Sir Bernard Montgomery, in honour of his 1942 victory in the Egyptian town of El Alamein against Rommel's Afrikakorps, was created Viscount Montgomery of Alamein in 1946.
- Admiral Sir Bruce Fraser, victor of the Battle of North Cape in 1943, was created Baron Fraser of North Cape in 1946.
- Admiral Lord Louis Mountbatten, who oversaw the recapture of Burma from the Japanese, was created Viscount Mountbatten of Burma in 1946 and Earl Mountbatten of Burma in 1947.

Often the victory is commemorated in the territorial designation rather than the peerage itself. Examples include:

- Robert Clive, victor of the Battle of Plassey, was created Baron Clive, of Plassey in the County of Clare in 1767.
- Jeffery Amherst, who captured Montreal during the French and Indian War, was created Baron Amherst, of Montreal in the County of Kent in 1788. Though the designation refers to Montreal Park in Kent, the estate had been named after the victory.
- Rear Admiral Sir Horatio Nelson, victor of the Battle of the Nile, was created Baron Nelson, of the Nile and of Burnham Thorpe in the County of Norfolk, in 1798, and (by this time a Vice-Admiral) was further created Viscount Nelson, of the Nile and of Burnham Thorpe in the County of Norfolk. He was created Baron Nelson, of the Nile and of Hilborough in the County of Norfolk in August 1801. After his victory and death at the Battle of Trafalgar, his brother was created Earl Nelson, of Trafalgar and of Merton in the County of Surrey, and Viscount Merton, of Trafalgar and of Merton in the County of Surrey, in 1805, in his honour.
- Mary, Lady Abercromby, widow of Sir Ralph Abercromby, victor of the Battle of Abukir (1801), who had died of wounds received in that battle, was created Baroness Abercromby, of Aboukir and of Tullibody in the County of Clackmannan, in 1801, in honour of her late husband.
- John Hely-Hutchinson, victor of the Siege of Alexandria, was created Baron Hutchinson, of Alexandria and Knocklofty in the County of Tipperary, in 1801.
- Gerard Lake, victor of the Battle of Delhi, 1803 and the Battle of Laswari (1803), was created Baron Lake, of Delhi and Laswary and of Aston Clinton in the County of Buckingham in 1804 and Viscount Lake with the same designation in 1807.
- Lieutenant-General Sir Arthur Wellesley (later the 1st Duke of Wellington), victor of the Battle of Talavera, was created Viscount Wellington, of Talavera and of Wellington in the County of Somerset, in 1809.
- William Carr Beresford, victor of the Battle of Albuera (1811), was created Baron Beresford, of Albuera and Dungarvan in the County of Waterford in 1814.
- Rowland Hill, victor of the Battle of Almaraz (1812), was created Baron Hill, of Almaraz and of Hawkestone in the County of Shropshire in 1814 and Baron Hill, of Almaraz and of Hardwicke in the County of Shropshire in 1816.
- George Harris, victor of the Siege of Seringapatam (1799) against the Kingdom of Mysore, was created Baron Harris, of Seringapatam and Mysore in the East Indies and of Belmont in the County of Kent in 1815.
- William Amherst, 2nd Baron Amherst, Governor-General of India during the First Anglo-Burmese War (1824-1826) that resulted in the annexation of Arakan, was created Earl Amherst, of Arracan in the East Indies in 1826.
- Stapleton Cotton, 1st Baron Combermere, who captured the fort at Bharatpur in 1826 while serving as Commander-in-Chief, India, was created Viscount Combermere, of Bhurtpore in the East Indies and Combermere in the County Palatine of Chester in 1827.
- Sir John Keane, commander at the Battle of Ghazni (1839), was created Baron Keane, of Ghuznee in Affghanistan and of Cappoquin in the County of Waterford in 1839.
- Sir Hugh Gough, victor at the Battle of Chinkiang (1842), in the Gwalior campaign (1843) and in the First Anglo-Sikh War (1845-1846), was created Baron Gough, of ChingKangFoo in China and of Maharajpore and the Sutlej in the East Indies in 1846, and following the Battle of Gujrat (1849) was further created Viscount Gough, of Goojerat in the Punjab and of the City of Limerick in 1849.
- Sir Henry Hardinge, who concluded the Treaty of Lahore (1846) that ended the First Anglo-Sikh War, was created Viscount Hardinge, of Lahore and of King's Newton in the County of Derby in 1846.
- James Broun-Ramsay, 10th Earl of Dalhousie, who was Governor-General of India during the Second Anglo-Sikh War (1848-1849) that resulted in the British annexation of the Punjab, was created Marquess of Dalhousie, of Dalhousie Castle in the County of Edinburgh, and of the Punjab in 1849.
- Hugh Henry Rose, who captured Jhansi (1858) during the Indian Mutiny, was created Baron Strathnairn, of Strathnairn in the County of Nairn and of Jhansi in the East Indies in 1866.
- Sir John Lawrence, who served as Chief Commissioner of the Punjab during the Indian Mutiny of 1857-1859, was created Baron Lawrence, of the Punjab and of Grateley in the County of Southampton in 1869.
- Sir Garnet Wolseley, who captured Cairo after the Battle of Tel el-Kebir (1882), was created Baron Wolseley, of Cairo and of Wolseley in the County of Stafford, in 1882.
- Sir Frederick Roberts, victor of the Battle of Kandahar (1880), was created Baron Roberts, of Kandahar in Afghanistan and of the City of Waterford in 1892. Following the Battle of Diamond Hill near Pretoria in 1900, he was further created Earl Roberts, of Kandahar in Afghanistan and of Pretoria in the Transvaal Colony and of the City of Waterford in 1901.
- Major-General Sir Herbert Kitchener, in recognition of his victory in the Battle of Omdurman (1898), was created Baron Kitchener, of Khartoum and of Aspall in the County of Suffolk (Khartoum being the less obscure but relatively nearby capital of the Anglo-Egyptian Sudan), in 1898. In 1902 (by this time a full General) he was further created Viscount Kitchener of Khartoum, of Khartoum and of the Vaal in the Colony of Transvaal and of Aspall in the County of Suffolk (having been Administrator of Transvaal and of the Orange River Colony in 1901). In June 1914 (having achieved the rank of Field Marshal in 1909) he was further created Earl Kitchener of Khartoum and of Broome, of Khartoum and of Broome in the County of Kent.
- Field Marshal Sir John French, the first commander (1914-1915) of the British Expeditionary Force in the First World War, was created Viscount French, of Ypres and of High Lake in the County of Roscommon, in 1916.
- Admiral of the Fleet Sir David Beatty, the First Sea Lord (1919-1927) and formerly Commander-in-Chief of the Grand Fleet (1916-1919) during the last years of the First World War, was, as one of the subsidiary titles granted to him with the Earldom of Beatty, created Baron Beatty, of the North Sea and of Brooksby in the County of Leicester, in 1919.
- Field Marshal Sir Edmund Allenby, victor of the Battle of Megiddo (1918), was created Viscount Allenby, of Megiddo and of Felixstowe in the County of Suffolk, in 1919.
- Field Marshal Sir Herbert Plumer, commander in the Battle of Messines (1917), was created Baron Plumer, of Messines and of Bilton in the County of York, in 1919 and Viscount Plumer, of Messines and of Bilton in the County of York, in 1929.
- Field Marshal Sir William Birdwood, best known as the commander (1914-1918) of ANZAC troops in the First World War, was created Baron Birdwood, of Anzac and of Totnes in the County of Devon, in 1938.
- Field Marshal Sir Edmund Ironside, who commanded the British forces around Arkhangelsk in the North Russia Campaign of 1918-1920, was created Baron Ironside, of Archangel and Ironside in the County of Aberdeen, in 1941.
- Field Marshal Sir Henry Wilson, a senior British general in the Second World War, was created Baron Wilson, of Libya and of Stowlangtoft in the County of Suffolk, in 1946.

=== Austrian Empire ===
In the Austrian Empire titles of nobility could be amended with territorial designations, the so-called predicates. These were usually named after the estates of the family in question, but sometimes the Habsburg rulers of Austria also granted victory titles. This happened particularly during World War I. Examples include:

- Colonel General Viktor Dankl, who in 1914 defeated Russian forces in the Battle of Kraśnik. When he was made a Graf (count) in 1918, he received the title of Graf Dankl von Krasnik.
- Colonel General Josef Roth, who played a decisive role in the Battle of Limanowa in 1914, when the Austro-Hungarian Army repelled a Russian breakthrough, was ennobled as Freiherr (baron) in 1918 with the style of Freiherr Roth von Limanowa-Lapanów.
- Major General Ignaz Trollmann, whose XIX. Corps helped to conquer the Lovćen mountain near Kotor in 1916, was ennobled as Freiherr (baron) in 1917 with the style of Freiherr Trollmann von Lovcenberg.

=== Kingdom of Hungary ===
The system used in the Kingdom of Hungary by the Habsburgs resembled the one employed in Austria. Titles of nobility could be amended with territorial designations, the so-called predicates. These were usually named after the estates of the family in question, but sometimes also specific victory titles were granted. Examples include:

- General Baron Pál Kray de Krajova et Topolya (1705–1804), who received the predicate de Krajova or Krajovai after he conquered the Romanian town of Craiova during the Austro-Turkish War (1788–1791).
- Colonel General Stefan Sarkotić, the Commanding General in Bosnia and Herzegovina during World War I, was ennobled as a Hungarian baron and the style of Baron Sarkotić von Lovćen in early 1917 after Trollmann's XIX. Corps had conquered the Lovćen mountain near Kotor.
- Sándor Szurmay was created baron by King Charles IV with the predicate de Uzsok or Uzsoki. He was the hero of the battle of Uzsok (March 1915).

During the Regency of Hungary after World War I, the Regent Miklós Horthy was not authorized to grant titles of nobility, but conferred the Order of Vitéz which sometimes but necessarily also carried noble predicates. Initially membership was restricted to men who had served with special distinction in the war. Examples commemorating military action include:

- Captain Rihmer de Granasztó granted the title vitéz Gerlefalvi for his bravery at Gerlefalva, today Girovce, Slovakia.

=== Kingdom of Spain ===
The Spanish crown has awarded similar titles such as Adelantado which was used as a military title held by some Spanish conquistadors of the 15th, 16th and 17th centuries. Subsequently, further victory titles were awarded. Examples include:

- Manuel de Godoy was created Principe de la Paz (Prince of Peace) in 1795 after negotiating the Peace of Basel.
- The English Viscount Wellington (later Duke of Wellington) was created Duke of Ciudad Rodrigo (hereditary).
- Tomás de Zumalacárregui was created Duke of the Victoria of the Amezcoas by the Carlist pretender Don Carlos in 1836.
- Baldomero Espartero was created Duke of la Victoria by Isabella II in 1839 and Prince of Vergara by Amadeo I in 1872 after the Convention of Vergara.
- General Leopoldo O'Donnell was granted the title Duke of Tetuán by Isabella II after his success at the Battle of Tétouan.
- José Malcampo, 3rd Marquess of San Rafael, Prime Minister of Spain in 1871, during the reign of Amadeo I, was granted the titles of Count of Jolo and Viscount of Mindanao after the successful capture of the city of Jolo from the Sultanate of Sulu during his governorship-general (1874-1877) of the Philippines.

=== Kingdom of Naples ===
- Admiral Horatio Nelson was created Duke of Bronte. This is not a true victory title, as the duchy was granted in 1799 by Ferdinand IV, with the title of Duke — which in England sounds better than the others — as he wrote in a note to his minister, to Admiral Horatio Nelson in recognition of his military actions to safeguard the Kingdom of Naples. In fact, no battle took place in Bronte; the inscription "Heroes Immortals Nile" was engraved on Nelson's castle, as the victory achieved in the 1798 Battle of the Nile confirmed the superiority of the British navy over Napoleon's.
- General Sir John Stuart, commander of a British expeditionary force at the Battle of Maida to counter Napoleon's army, was created Conte di Maida (Count of Maida) by Ferdinand IV for his victory there on July 4, 1806. The Battle of Maida was the first victory of the British Army since the beginning of the Napoleonic Wars on the European continent. In his homeland, John Stuart was known as Hero of Maida.
- General Johann Maria Philipp Frimont, commander-in-chief of the Imperial Austrian Army in the Kingdom of Naples, was created Prince of Antrodoco (Royal Decree of November 30, 1821) for his victory at the Battle of Antrodoco against the Neapolitan insurgents led by General Guglielmo Pepe during the uprisings of 1820-1821.

=== Kingdom of Italy ===
The Kingdom of Italy under the House of Savoy granted many victory titles. The practice of bestowing such titles became especially common after the unification of Italy and again after World War I, when several were appointed. Examples include:

- General Enrico Cialdini, created Duca di Gaeta for his role during the Siege of Gaeta (1860). This was the concluding event of the war between the Kingdom of Sardinia and the Kingdom of the Two Sicilies, through which Cialdini's Piemonte-Sardinian forces secured victory over King Francis II of the Two Sicilies. The choice of this title was somewhat ironic as it had been the name of a Napoleonic duché grand-fief but only the withdrawal of the French fleet made the bombardment of Gaeta from the sea by Cialdini's forces possible.
- General Armando Diaz, created 1st Duca della Vittoria ("Duke of the Victory") in 1922. He had been the Chief of Staff of the Italian Army (1917–1918) during World War I.
- Admiral Paolo Thaon di Revel, created 1st Duca del Mare ("Duke of the Sea") in 1922. He had been the Chief of the Italian Naval Staff (1913–1915 and 1917–1919) during World War I.
- Commodore Luigi Rizzo, created 1st Conte di Grado e di Premuda for his services as naval commander in World War I during which he also sank the Austrian battleship SMS Szent István.
- Costanzo Ciano, created 1st Conte di Cortellazzo e di Buccari, a naval commander in World War I and President of the Italian Chamber of Deputies between 1934 and 1939.
- Cesare Maria De Vecchi, created 1st Conte di Val Cismon in memory of the battles fought by his arditi on Monte Grappa in 1918. Later served as colonial administrator and Fascist politician.
- Gabriele D'Annunzio, created 1st Principe di Montenevoso in 1924 for his services as poet, journalist, novelist, dramatist and aviator during World War I.
- Marshal Pietro Badoglio, created 1st Marchese del Sabotino and later 1st Duca di Addis Abeba after the invasion of Abyssinia in 1935.
- General Rodolfo Graziani, created 1st Marchese di Neghelli for his services as leader of military expeditions in Africa before and during World War II.
- Prince Maurizio Ferrante Gonzaga di Vescovato, created 1st Marchese del Vodice in 1932. Also received the Gold Medal of Military Valor. (Full Titles and decorations, in Italian)

=== Other monarchies ===
- The Kingdom of Portugal created the first Duke of Wellington Duque da Vitória (Duke of Victory), Marquês de Torres Vedras (from the Lines of Torres Vedras of 1809-1810) and Conde de Vimeiro (from the Battle of Vimeiro of 1808).
- The Dutch royal house of Orange, then of the United Kingdom of the Netherlands, created the first Duke of Wellington Prince of Waterloo (in Belgium) in 1815.

== Sources and references ==
François R. Velde. Napoleonic Titles and Heraldry: Victory Titles
