= William Amherst =

William Amherst may refer to:

- William Amherst (British Army officer) (1732–1781), lieutenant colonel during the French and Indian War, MP for Hythe and Launceston
- William Amherst, 1st Earl Amherst (1773–1857), Governor-General of Bengal
- William Amherst, 2nd Earl Amherst (1805–1886), British peer
- William Amherst, 3rd Earl Amherst (1836–1910), British peer and freemason
- William Tyssen-Amherst, 1st Baron Amherst of Hackney (1835–1909), British Conservative Member of Parliament
