= South Amherst =

South Amherst may refer to:

- South Amherst, Massachusetts, USA
  - South Amherst Common Historic District
- South Amherst, Ohio, USA
  - South Amherst High School

== See also ==
- Amherst (disambiguation)
