= List of Theta Tau chapters =

Theta Tau is a professional engineering fraternity established in 1904 at the University of Minnesota in Minneapolis, Minnesota. Below is a list of the Theta Tau chapters, with active chapters indicated in bold and inactive chapters in italics.

Chapter	Charter date and range	Institution	City	State	Region	Status	Ref.
Alpha	October 15, 1904 – xxxx ?; xxxx ? – 2023	University of Minnesota	Minneapolis	Minnesota	Midwest	Inactive	
**Beta**	March 26, 1906	Michigan Technological University	Houghton	Michigan	Midwest	Active	(Note: Chapter was formed by absorbing the Rhombohedron Club, established in 1903.)
Gamma	November 8, 1907	Colorado School of Mines	Golden	Colorado	Central	Inactive	(Note: Chapter formed by absorbing the local Square Set Club.)
**Delta**	May 23, 1911 – xxxx ?; November 13, 2016	Case Western Reserve University	Cleveland	Ohio	Great Lakes	Active	
**Epsilon**	May 4, 1911 – xxxx ?; January 22, 2011	University of California, Berkeley	Berkeley	California	Northwest	Active	
**Zeta**	April 17, 1912	University of Kansas	Lawrence	Kansas	Central	Active	
Eta	May 23, 1912 – 1930; April 29, 2017 - October 7, 2024	Massachusetts Institute of Technology	Cambridge	Massachusetts	Northeast	Withdrew (ΦΚΨ)	(Note: Became the Massachusetts Gamma chapter of Phi Kappa Psi in 2024.)
Theta	May 26, 1914	Columbia University	New York City	New York	Mid-Atlantic	Inactive	
Iota	December 30, 1915 - December 26, 1976	Missouri University of Science and Technology	Rolla	Missouri	Midwest	Inactive	
**Kappa**	March 25, 1916 – 1939; February 9, 2008	University of Illinois Urbana-Champaign	Urbana	Illinois	Midwest	Active	
Lambda	April 29, 1920 – xxxx ?	University of Utah	Salt Lake City	Utah	Northwest	Inactive	
**Mu**	January 3, 1922	University of Alabama	Tuscaloosa	Alabama	Southeast	Active	
Nu	January 1, 1922 – 1950	Carnegie Mellon University	Pittsburgh	Pennsylvania	Great Lakes	Inactive	
**Xi**	January 13, 1923 – 1929; March 22, 1947	University of Wisconsin–Madison	Madison	Wisconsin	Midwest	Active	
**Omicron**	February 3, 1923 – 1944; March 29, 1947	University of Iowa	Iowa City	Iowa	Midwest	Active	
**Pi**	May 26, 1923 – 197x ?; October 1, 1988	University of Virginia	Charlottesville	Virginia	Atlantic	Active	
**Rho**	February 16, 1924	North Carolina State University	Raleigh	North Carolina	Southeast	Active	
**Sigma**	November 29, 1924	Ohio State University	Columbus	Ohio	Great Lakes	Active	
Tau	December 12, 1925 – 19xx; 199x - 2021	Syracuse University	Syracuse	New York	Northeast	Inactive	
**Upsilon**	April 7, 1928	University of Arkansas	Fayetteville	Arkansas	Central	Active	
Phi	April 21, 1928 – 2024	Purdue University	West Lafayette	Indiana	Midwest	Withdrew (ΦΚΤ)	(Note: Became the Lambda chapter of Phi Kappa Tau in 2024.)
**Chi**	April 23, 1930	University of Arizona	Tucson	Arizona	Southwest	Active	
Psi	May 7, 1932 – xxxx ?	Montana Technological University	Butte	Montana	Northwest	Inactive	
Omega	March 26, 1932 – October 2025	South Dakota School of Mines and Technology	Rapid City	South Dakota	Central	Withdrew (ΦΚΤ)	(Note: Became the Zeta Omega chapter of Phi Kappa Tau in 2025.)
**Gamma Beta**	March 16, 1935 – 197x ?; September 23, 1989	George Washington University	Washington	District of Columbia	Atlantic	Active	
Delta Beta	May 20, 1939 – 1947	University of Louisville	Louisville	Kentucky	Midwest	Withdrew (ΣΦΕ)	(Note: Became the Kentucky Beta chapter of Sigma Phi Epsilon after WWII.)
Epsilon Beta	May 19, 1951	Wayne State University	Detroit	Michigan	Great Lakes	Inactive	
Zeta Beta	May 7, 1960 – xxxx ?	Utah State University	Logan	Utah	Northwest	Inactive	
Eta Beta	May 13, 1961 – xxxx ?	University of Houston	Houston	Texas	Central	Inactive	
**Theta Beta**	March 2, 1963 – 19xx ?; February 4, 2023	University of Washington	Seattle	Washington	Northwest	Active	
Iota Beta	February 15, 1964 – xxxx ?	University of Detroit	Detroit	Michigan	Great Lakes	Inactive	
**Kappa Beta**	November 21, 1964	Mississippi State University	Starkville	Mississippi	Southeast	Active	
Lambda Beta	September 29, 1968 – 2021	Tennessee Tech	Cookeville	Tennessee	Southeast	Inactive	
Mu Beta	August 2, 1969 – xxxx ?	GMI Engineering & Management Institute	Flint	Michigan	Great Lakes	Inactive	
Nu Beta	April 26, 1975 – xxxx ?	University of Wisconsin–Platteville	Platteville	Wisconsin	Midwest	Inactive	
**Xi Beta**	November 21, 1987	Lawrence Technological University	Southfield	Michigan	Great Lakes	Active	
**Omicron Beta**	January 16, 1988	University of Michigan–Dearborn	Dearborn	Michigan	Great Lakes	Active	
Pi Beta	June 17, 1989 – xxxx ?	Western Michigan University	Kalamazoo	Michigan	Great Lakes	Inactive	
**Rho Beta**	November 4, 1989	Ohio University	Athens	Ohio	Great Lakes	Active	
Sigma Beta	December 2, 1989 – xxxx ?	University of Wisconsin–Milwaukee	Milwaukee	Wisconsin	Midwest	Inactive	
**Tau Beta**	May 4, 1990	Southern Methodist University	Dallas	Texas	Central	Active	
**Upsilon Beta**	November 3, 1990	Old Dominion University	Norfolk	Virginia	Atlantic	Active	
Phi Beta	January 5, 1991 – xxxx ?	Oakland University	Rochester	Michigan	Great Lakes	Inactive	
**Chi Beta**	May 4, 1991	University of Toledo	Toledo	Ohio	Great Lakes	Active	
**Psi Beta**	April 27, 1991	University of Texas at Austin	Austin	Texas	Central	Active	
**Omega Beta**	April 30, 1994	Hofstra University	Hempstead	New York	Mid-Atlantic	Active	
**Delta Gamma**	May 6, 1995	Arizona State University	Tempe	Arizona	Southwest	Active	
Epsilon Gamma	November 18, 1995 – xxxx ?	Northwestern University	Evanston	Illinois	Midwest	Inactive	
**Zeta Gamma**	April 27, 1996	University of Florida	Gainesville	Florida	Gulf	Active	
**Eta Gamma**	April 5, 1997	University of Colorado Boulder	Boulder	Colorado	Central	Active	
**Theta Gamma**	April 17, 1999	University of Michigan	Ann Arbor	Michigan	Great Lakes	Active	
**Iota Gamma**	May 22, 1999	University of Cincinnati	Cincinnati	Ohio	Midwest	Active	
**Kappa Gamma**	September 9, 2000	Virginia Commonwealth University	Richmond	Virginia	Atlantic	Active	
**Lambda Gamma**	January 13, 2001	Clemson University	Clemson	South Carolina	Southeast	Active	
**Mu Gamma**	April 5, 2003	University at Buffalo	Buffalo	New York	Northeast	Active	
**Nu Gamma**	May 3, 2003	Binghamton University	Binghamton	New York	Northeast	Active	
**Xi Gamma**	April 24, 2004	Texas A&M University	College Station	Texas	Central	Active	
Omicron Gamma	April 29, 2007 - 2023	University of California, Davis	Davis	California	Northwest	Inactive	
Pi Gamma	August 25, 2007 - 2023	University of North Carolina at Charlotte	Charlotte	North Carolina	Southeast	Inactive	
**Rho Gamma**	September 8, 2007	University of Central Florida	Orlando	Florida	Gulf	Active	
**Sigma Gamma**	November 3, 2007	University of Rhode Island	Kingston	Rhode Island	Northeast	Active	
**Tau Gamma**	March 29, 2008	University of Pennsylvania	Philadelphia	Pennsylvania	Mid-Atlantic	Active	
**Upsilon Gamma**	April 5, 2008	University of South Florida	Tampa	Florida	Gulf	Active	
**Phi Gamma**	April 19, 2008	Oklahoma State University–Stillwater	Stillwater	Oklahoma	Central	Active	
**Chi Gamma**	January 31, 2009	University of Tennessee	Knoxville	Tennessee	Southeast	Active	
**Psi Gamma**	April 10, 2010	Virginia Tech	Blacksburg	Virginia	Atlantic	Active	
**Omega Gamma**	July 24, 2010	Florida International University	Miami	Florida	Gulf	Active	
**Epsilon Delta**	November 20, 2010	University of California, San Diego	La Jolla	California	Southwest	Active	
**Zeta Delta**	February 5, 2011	University of South Carolina	Columbia	South Carolina	Southeast	Active	
**Eta Delta**	March 5, 2011	University of Maryland, College Park	College Park	Maryland	Atlantic	Active	
**Theta Delta**	May 7, 2011	Johns Hopkins University	Baltimore	Maryland	Atlantic	Active	
**Iota Delta**	September 17, 2011	Vanderbilt University	Nashville	Tennessee	Southeast	Active	
Kappa Delta	April 14, 2012	Cornell University	Ithaca	New York	Northeast	Inactive	
**Lambda Delta**	April 22, 2012	University of the Pacific	Stockton	California	Northwest	Active	
**Mu Delta**	April 29, 2012	University of California, Merced	Merced	California	Northwest	Active	
**Nu Delta**	September 15, 2012	University of Pittsburgh	Pittsburgh	Pennsylvania	Great Lakes	Active	
**Xi Delta**	October 6, 2012	George Mason University	Fairfax	Virginia	Atlantic	Active	
**Omicron Delta**	February 9, 2013	Rutgers University–New Brunswick	New Brunswick	New Jersey	Mid-Atlantic	Active	
**Pi Delta**	April 13, 2013	University of California, Irvine	Irvine	California	Southwest	Active	
**Rho Delta**	November 9, 2013	University of Nevada, Reno	Reno	Nevada	Northwest	Active	
**Sigma Delta**	April 26, 2014	University of California, Riverside	Riverside	California	Southwest	Active	
**Tau Delta**	December 13, 2014	Miami University	Oxford	Ohio	Midwest	Active	
**Upsilon Delta**	April 25, 2015	University of California, Los Angeles	Los Angeles	California	Southwest	Active	
**Phi Delta**	May 30, 2015	Florida A&M University and Florida State University	Tallahassee	Florida	Gulf	Active	
Chi Delta	August 23, 2015 – 2021	Marshall University	Huntington	West Virginia	Great Lakes	Inactive	
**Psi Delta**	April 9, 2016	Boston University	Boston	Massachusetts	Northeast	Active	
**Omega Delta**	May 21, 2016	Christian Brothers University	Memphis	Tennessee	Southeast	Active	
**Zeta Epsilon**	September 10, 2016	Stony Brook University	Stony Brook	New York	Mid-Atlantic	Active	
Eta Epsilon	October 15, 2016 – 2021	University of Maine	Orono	Maine	Northeast	Inactive	
**Theta Epsilon**	November 19, 2016	New York University	New York City	New York	Mid-Atlantic	Active	
**Iota Epsilon**	April 8, 2017	University of Georgia	Athens	Georgia	Southeast	Active	
**Kappa Epsilon**	September 3, 2017	University of Southern California	Los Angeles	California	Southwest	Active	
**Lambda Epsilon**	September 23, 2017	University of San Diego	San Diego	California	Southwest	Active	
Mu Epsilon	September 30, 2017 - 2023	Baylor University	Waco	Texas	Central	Inactive	
**Nu Epsilon**	April 14, 2018	Tulane University	New Orleans	Louisiana	Southeast	Active	
**Xi Epsilon**	October 13, 2018	California State University, Long Beach	Long Beach	California	Southwest	Active	
**Omicron Epsilon**	December 1, 2018	Northern Arizona University	Flagstaff	Arizona	Southwest	Active	
**Pi Epsilon**	March 16, 2019	Temple University	Philadelphia	Pennsylvania	Mid-Atlantic	Active	
**Rho Epsilon**	May 4, 2019	Drexel University	Philadelphia	Pennsylvania	Mid-Atlantic	Active	
**Sigma Epsilon**	June 1, 2019	University of California, Santa Barbara	Santa Barbara	California	Southwest	Active	
Tau Epsilon	January 25, 2020 - 2023	New Jersey Institute of Technology	Newark	New Jersey	Mid-Atlantic	Inactive	
**Upsilon Epsilon**	February 8, 2020	Santa Clara University	Santa Clara	California	Northwest	Active	
**Phi Epsilon**	February 22, 2020	California State University, Fullerton	Fullerton	California	Southwest	Active	
**Chi Epsilon**	September 25, 2021	The College of New Jersey	Ewing	New Jersey	Mid-Atlantic	Active	
**Psi Epsilon**	December 4, 2021	Florida Institute of Technology	Melbourne	Florida	Gulf	Active	
**Omega Epsilon**	December 3, 2022	San Jose State University	San Jose	California	Northwest	Active	
**Eta Zeta**	September 16, 2023	James Madison University	Harrisonburg	Virginia	Atlantic	Active	
Theta Zeta	April 20, 2024	University of Nevada	Las Vegas	Nevada	Southwest	Inactive	
**Iota Zeta**	June 1, 2024	California Polytechnic State University	San Luis Obispo	California	Southwest	Active	
**Duke University candidate**	September 2, 2023	Duke University	Durham	North Carolina	Southeast	Active	
**Wake Forest University candidate**	September 3, 2023	Wake Forest University	Winston-Salem	North Carolina	Southeast	Active	
**Howard University candidate**	September 27, 2025	Howard University	Washington	District of Columbia	Atlantic	Active	
**University of Massachusetts Amherst candidate**	February 21, 2026	University of Massachusetts Amherst	Amherst	Massachusetts	Northeast	Active	
**Kent State University candidate**	April 11, 2026	Kent State University	Kent	Ohio	Great Lakes	Active	
**University of Manchester candidate**	April 25, 2026	University of Manchester	Manchester	England, United Kingdom	Southeast	Active	
**Texas Christian University candidate**	May 2, 2026	Texas Christian University	Fort Worth	Texas	Central	Active	
