= Hugh Amherst, 4th Earl Amherst =

British peer

Hugh Amherst, 4th Earl Amherst (30 January 1856 – 7 March 1927) was a British peer, who succeeded to the earldom and its associated titles upon the death of his brother William in 1910. Amherst joined the Coldstream Guards in 1875, served in the Nile campaigns from 1884–1885 and became a captain in 1887. In 1896 he married Eleanor Clementina St. Aubyn. He lived at Montreal Park near Sevenoaks in Kent.

In 1911 he was one of the 114 peers who voted against the passing of the Parliament Act 1911.

His son, Jeffrey John Archer Holmesdale, was a dramatic critic of The Evening World in New York City. He assumed the title of Viscount Holmesdale upon his father's death.

Peerage of the United Kingdom
Preceded by William Amherst	Earl Amherst; 1910–1927	Succeeded by Jeffery Amherst
