= Baron Amherst =

Baron Amherst may refer to:

- Baron Amherst of Holmesdale in the County of Kent (Peerage of Great Britain) — created in 1776 for Jeffery Amherst and extinct in 1797.
- Baron Amherst, of Montreal in the County of Kent (Peerage of Great Britain) — created in 1788 for Jeffery Amherst, 1st Baron Amherst and extinct in 1993.
- Baron Amherst of Hackney (Peerage of the United Kingdom) — created in 1892 for William Tyssen-Amherst; extant.

== See also ==
- Earl Amherst
- Amherst (disambiguation)
