= Fort Amherst (disambiguation) =

There are several historical locations known as Fort Amherst:

- The fortress at Fort Amherst in England.
- The neighbourhood of Fort Amherst at the entrance to the harbour at St. John's, Newfoundland.
- Port-la-Joye—Fort Amherst, a Canadian National Historic Site on Prince Edward Island.

== See also ==
- Amherst (disambiguation)
