= Amherst Township =

Amherst Township may refer to the following townships in the US:

- Amherst Township, Cherokee County, Iowa
- Amherst Township, Fillmore County, Minnesota
- Amherst Township, Lorain County, Ohio

== See also ==
- Amherst County
- Amherst (disambiguation)
