= South Amherst, Ohio =

- Village
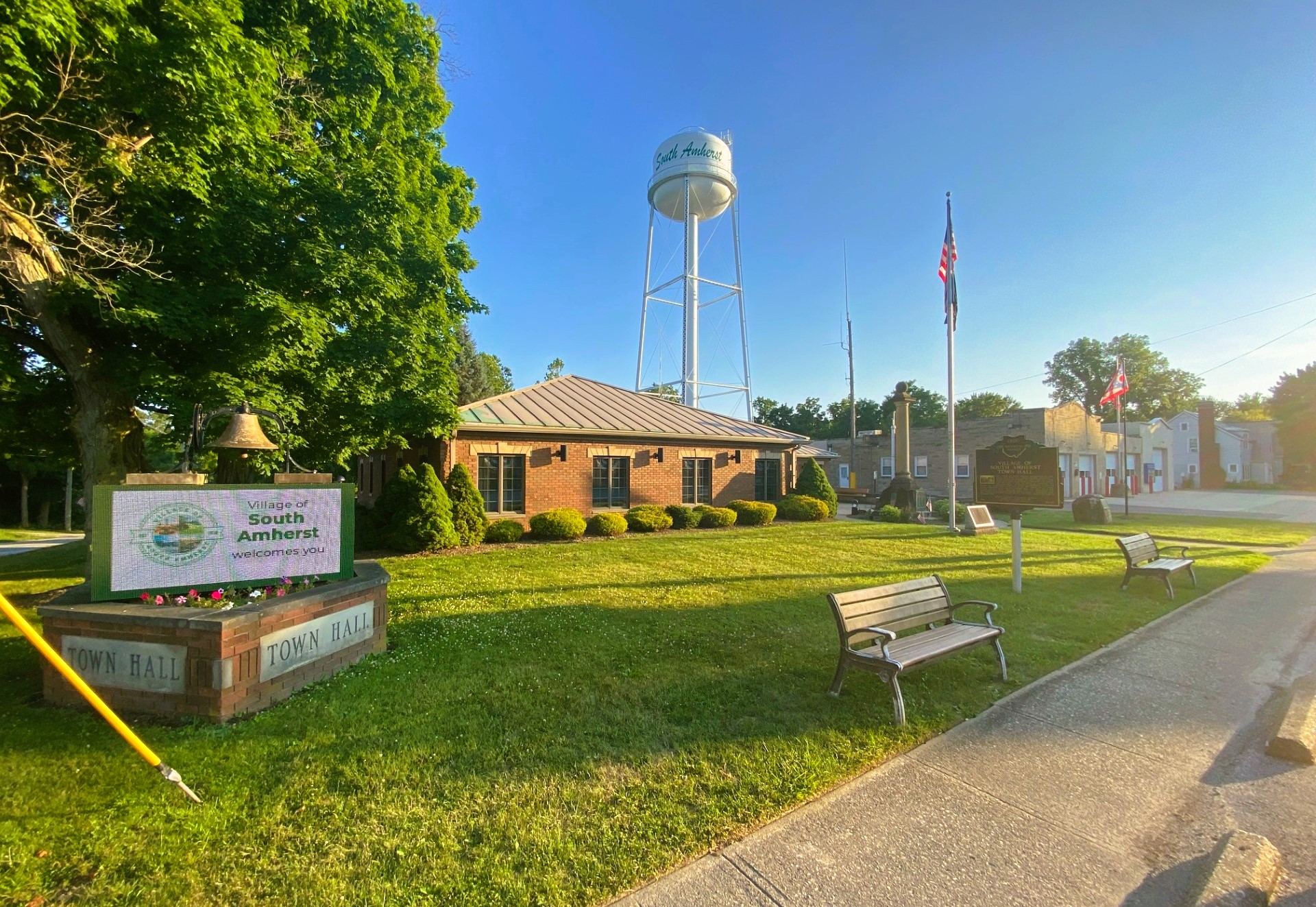
- South Amherst Town Hall and Fire Department.

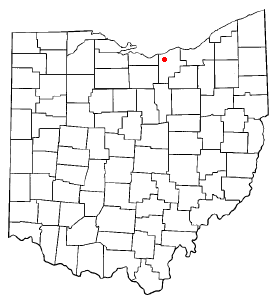
- Location of South Amherst, Ohio

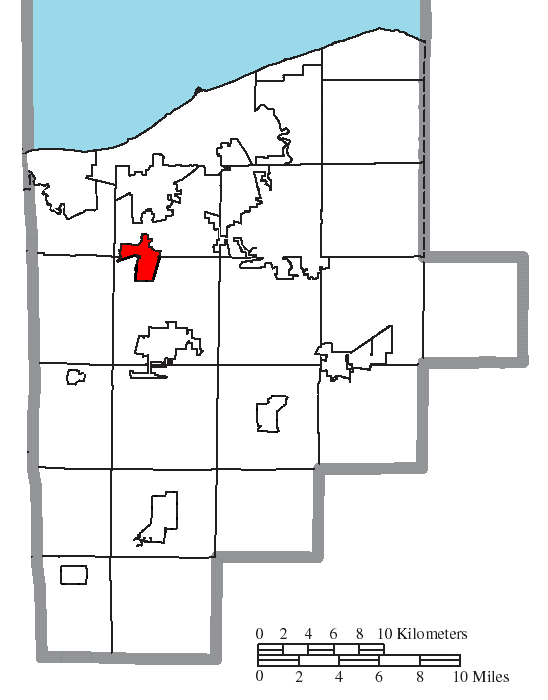
- Location of South Amherst in Lorain County
- Coordinates: 41°21′18″N 82°14′48″W
- Country: United States
- State: Ohio
- County: Lorain
- Townships: Amherst, New Russia

Area
  - Total: 2.42 sq mi (6.28 km^{2})
  - Land: 2.41 sq mi (6.23 km^{2})
  - Water: 0.019 sq mi (0.05 km^{2})
- Elevation: 774 ft (236 m)

Population (2020)
  - Total: 1,581
  - Density: 656.8/sq mi (253.58/km^{2})
- Time zone: UTC-5 (Eastern (EST))
  - Summer (DST): UTC-4 (EDT)
- ZIP code: 44001
- Area code: 440
- FIPS code: 39-73040
- GNIS feature ID: 2399840
- Website: www.villageofsouthamherst.com

South Amherst is a village in Lorain County, Ohio, United States. The population was 1,581 at the 2020 census.

== Geography ==
According to the United States Census Bureau, the village has a total area of 2.49 square miles (6.45 km^{2}), of which 2.47 square miles (6.40 km^{2}) is land and 0.02 square miles (0.05 km^{2}) is water.

== Demographics ==
Historical population
Census	Pop.	Note	%±
1920	944		—
1930	914		−3.2%
1940	847		−7.3%
1950	1,020		20.4%
1960	1,657		62.5%
1970	2,913		75.8%
1980	1,848		−36.6%
1990	1,765		−4.5%
2000	1,863		5.6%
2010	1,688		−9.4%
2020	1,581		−6.3%
U.S. Decennial Census

=== 2010 census ===
As of the census of 2010, there were 1,688 people, 665 households, and 506 families living in the village. The population density was 683.4 inhabitants per square mile (263.9/km^{2}). There were 693 housing units at an average density of 280.6 per square mile (108.3/km^{2}). The racial makeup of the village was 96.2% White, 0.4% African American, 0.7% Native American, 0.1% Asian, 0.5% from other races, and 2.1% from two or more races. Hispanic or Latino of any race were 2.7% of the population.

There were 665 households, of which 29.3% had children under the age of 18 living with them, 60.0% were married couples living together, 9.9% had a female householder with no husband present, 6.2% had a male householder with no wife present, and 23.9% were non-families. 20.9% of all households were made up of individuals, and 9.8% had someone living alone who was 65 years of age or older. The average household size was 2.51 and the average family size was 2.87.

The median age in the village was 46.1 years. 20.2% of residents were under the age of 18; 7.2% were between the ages of 18 and 24; 20.4% were from 25 to 44; 34.4% were from 45 to 64; and 17.8% were 65 years of age or older. The gender makeup of the village was 48.9% male and 51.1% female.

=== 2000 census ===
As of the census of 2000, there were 1,863 people, 669 households, and 535 families living in the village. The population density was 760.0 inhabitants per square mile (293.4/km^{2}). There were 681 housing units at an average density of 277.8 per square mile (107.3/km^{2}). The racial makeup of the village was 97.69% White, 0.32% African American, 0.32% Native American, 0.21% Asian, 0.70% from other races, and 0.75% from two or more races. Hispanic or Latino of any race were 1.93% of the population.

There were 669 households, out of which 36.8% had children under the age of 18 living with them, 70.0% were married couples living together, 7.2% had a female householder with no husband present, and 19.9% were non-families. 16.4% of all households were made up of individuals, and 8.5% had someone living alone who was 65 years of age or older. The average household size was 2.77 and the average family size was 3.11.

In the village, the population was spread out, with 26.7% under the age of 18, 6.4% from 18 to 24, 28.0% from 25 to 44, 24.9% from 45 to 64, and 14.0% who were 65 years of age or older. The median age was 39 years. For every 100 females there were 96.1 males. For every 100 females age 18 and over, there were 95.0 males.

The median income for a household in the village was $45,625, and the median income for a family was $50,313. Males had a median income of $40,833 versus $23,333 for females. The per capita income for the village was $19,607. About 2.9% of families and 4.2% of the population were below the poverty line, including 5.1% of those under age 18 and 4.6% of those age 65 or over.

== Education ==
South Amherst previously had its own high school, but following a merger in 1988, it currently is served by Firelands Local School District.
