= Amherst Regional Public Schools =

Group of school districts in Amherst, US

District information
- Superintendent: Mike Morris

Students and staff
- Students: 4000

Other information
- Website: www.arps.org

Amherst Regional Public Schools (sometimes referred to as the Union #26 and Amherst-Pelham Regional School Districts), is a group of school districts usually managed as a single entity, based in Amherst, Massachusetts which serves the Pioneer Valley of Western Massachusetts.

== Governance ==
Three separate school committees are responsible for governance of the Amherst-Pelham school system.

- The Amherst School Committee is responsible for the four elementary schools in the town of Amherst.
- The Pelham School Committee is responsible for Pelham Elementary School.
- The Regional School Committee is responsible for Amherst Regional Middle School and Amherst Regional High School.

== Superintendent ==
Dr. E. Xiomara Herman is the current Superintendent of schools.

The former superintendent, Mike Morris, left Amherst Regional Public Schools on August 25, 2023. ARPS Business Manager, Doug Slaughter, served in an interim role prior to Herman's hiring. Alberto Rodriguez, left that position on March 8, 2010, after negative evaluations by senior managers and controversy about some changes he had proposed. Maria Geryk, Assistant Superintendent of Student Services, was appointed Interim Superintendent, and then confirmed as superintendent.

== Schools ==
The district operates the following schools:

- Amherst Regional High School
- Amherst Regional Middle School
- Crocker Farm Elementary School
- Fort River Elementary School
- Pelham School (126 students, kindergarten through sixth grade)
- Wildwood Elementary School

Formerly Operated

- Mark's Meadow Elementary School (closed in 2009/2010)
