= William Amherst, 3rd Earl Amherst =

British peer, politician and notable Freemason

Captain The Right Honourable The Earl Amherst
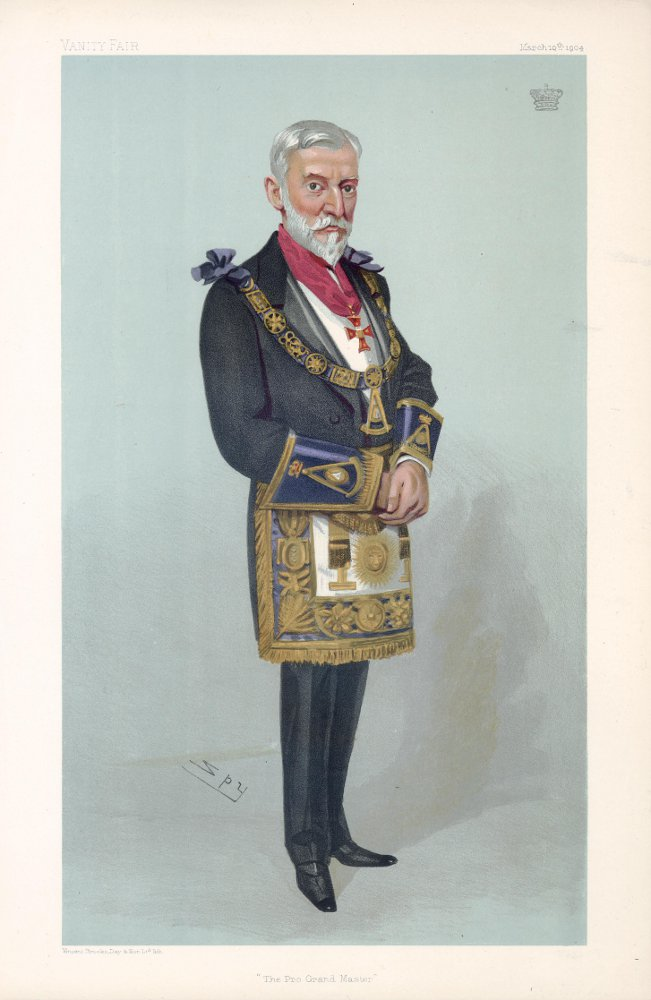
- "The Pro Grand Master", Lord Amherst as caricatured by Leslie Ward in Vanity Fair.
- Born: William Archer Amherst; 26 March 1836; Mayfair, London
- Died: 14 August 1910 (aged 74); Montreal Park, near Sevenoaks, Kent
- Education: Eton College
- Title: Earl Amherst
- Predecessor: William Amherst, 2nd Earl Amherst
- Successor: Hugh Amherst, 4th Earl Amherst
- Political party: Conservative
- Spouses: Julia Mann (m. 1862; died 1883) Alice Vaughan (m. 1889)
- Military career
- Allegiance: United Kingdom
- Branch: British Army
- Rank: Captain
- Unit: Coldstream Guards
- Conflicts: Crimean War (specifically the Battle of Balaclava, the Battle of Inkerman and the Siege of Sevastopol)

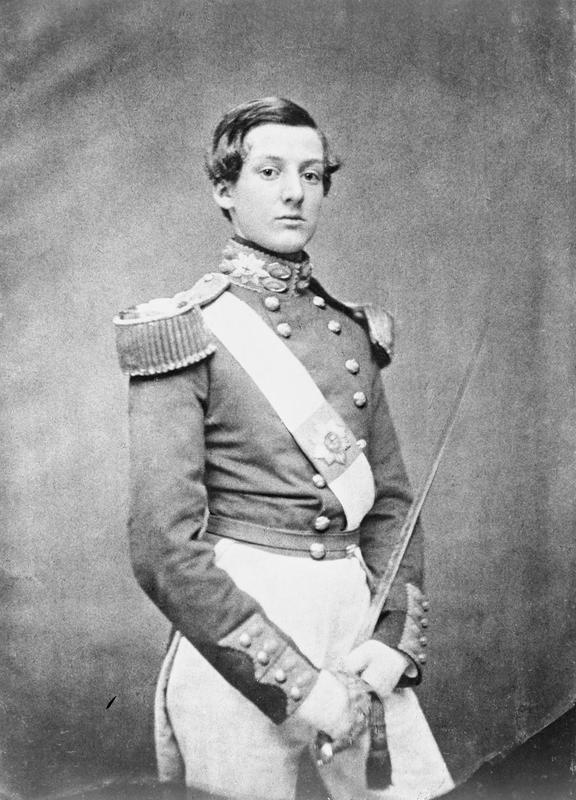
Amherst during the period of his service in the Crimea

William Archer Amherst, 3rd Earl Amherst (26 March 1836 – 14 August 1910), styled Viscount Holmesdale from 1857 to 1886, was a British peer, politician and notable Freemason.

He was born in Mayfair, London, the son of William Amherst, Viscount Holmesdale (later 2nd Earl Amherst) and was baptised on 3 May 1836 in St. George's Church, Hanover Square, London. He was educated at Eton and went on to serve with the Coldstream Guards, rising to the rank of captain and fighting in the Battle of Balaclava, the Battle of Inkerman (where he was severely wounded) and the Siege of Sevastopol during the Crimean War.

On his return from the Crimea, Holmesdale was elected Member of Parliament (MP) for West Kent at the 1859 general election. On 27 August 1862, he married Julia Mann (the only daughter of the James Mann, 5th Earl Cornwallis) in Linton, Kent.

In 1868 Holmesdale became MP for the new Mid Kent constituency, which he represented until 1880. He served as chairman of the National Union of Conservative and Constitutional Associations in 1868. On the death of his father in 1886, he became Earl Amherst. Julia died in 1883, and on 25 April 1889 he married Alice Vaughan (née Probyn), widow of Ernest Vaughan, 5th Earl of Lisburne in London.

He died in 1910, aged 74, at his home of Montreal Park, near Sevenoaks, Kent as a result of an operation he received three months prior for a throat infection. He was cremated on 16 August 1910 and his ashes buried two days later in nearby Riverhead. Despite having married twice, the earl died childless and his titles passed to his brother, Hugh.

Parliament of the United Kingdom
Preceded by James Whatman; Charles Wykeham Martin	Member of Parliament for West Kent; 1859–1868; With: Sir Edmund Filmer, Bt to 1865; William Hart Dyke from 1865	Succeeded by Charles Mills; John Gilbert Talbot
New constituency	Member of Parliament for Mid Kent; 1868 – 1880; With: Sir William Hart Dyke, Bt	Succeeded by Sir William Hart Dyke, Bt; Sir Edmund Filmer, Bt
Party political offices
Preceded by John Eldon Gorst	Chairman of the National Union of Conservative and Constitutional Associations; 1868	Succeeded by Henry Cecil Raikes
Masonic offices
Preceded by The Earl of Lathom	Pro Grand Master of the United Grand Lodge of England; 1898–1908	Succeeded by The Lord Ampthill
Peerage of the United Kingdom
Preceded by William Amherst	Earl Amherst; 1886–1910	Succeeded by Hugh Amherst
Peerage of Great Britain
Preceded by William Amherst	Baron Amherst (writ in acceleration); 1880–1910	Succeeded by Hugh Amherst
