= Amherst Mountain =

Mountain in La Plata County, Colorado, United States

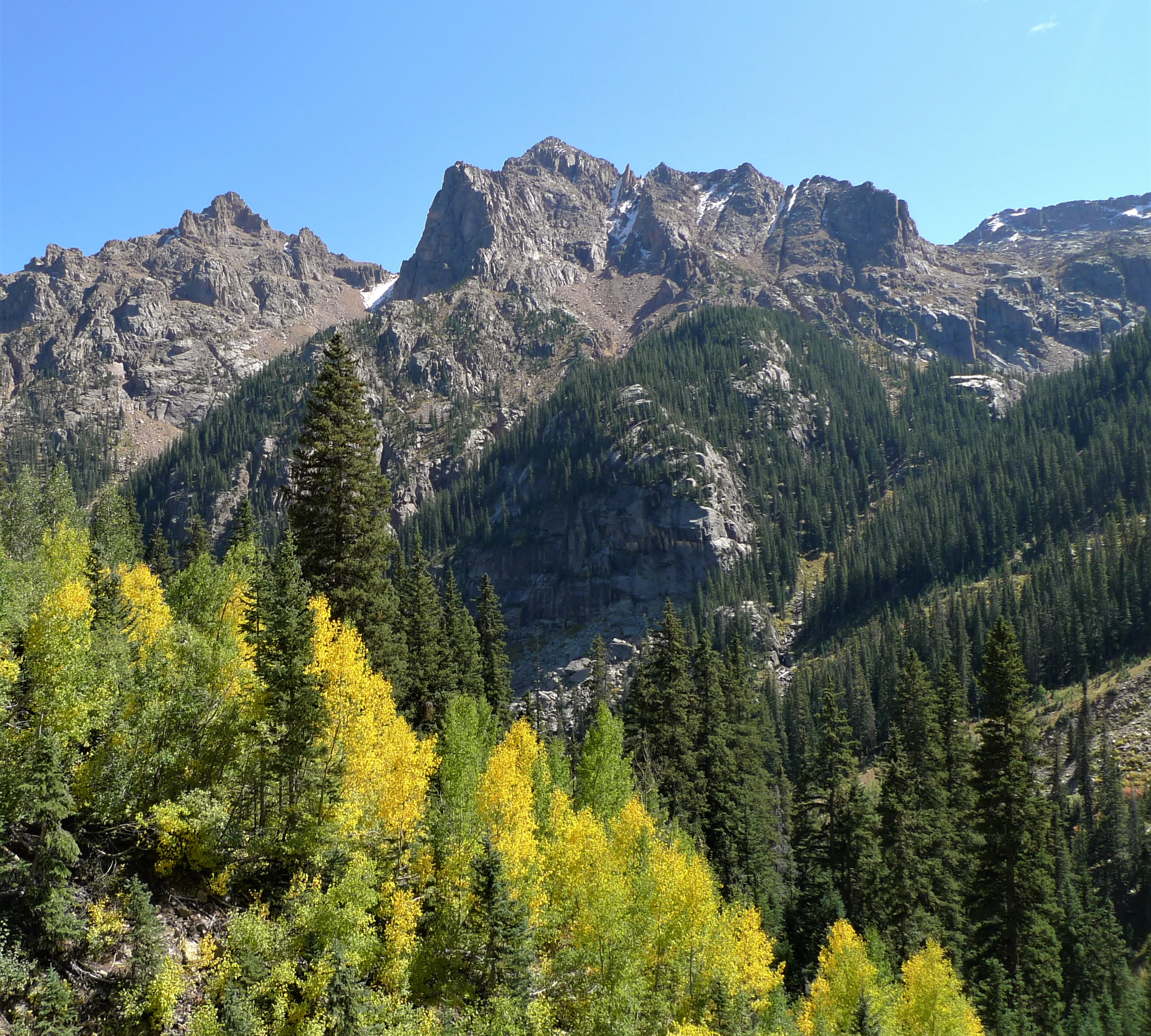
- Northwest aspect, centered (Organ Mountain to left)

Highest point
- Elevation: 13,165 ft (4,013 m)
- Prominence: 1,211 ft (369 m)
- Parent peak: Mount Valois (13,173 ft)
- Isolation: 1.58 mi (2.54 km)
- Coordinates: 37°33′54″N 107°33′34″W

Geography
- Location within Colorado Location within the United States
- Country: United States
- State: Colorado
- County: La Plata County
- Protected area: Weminuche Wilderness
- Parent range: Rocky Mountains; San Juan Mountains; Needle Mountains
- Topo map: USGS Columbine Pass

Climbing
- Easiest route: class 2

Amherst Mountain is a 13,165-foot (4,013 m) summit in La Plata County, Colorado, United States.

== Description ==
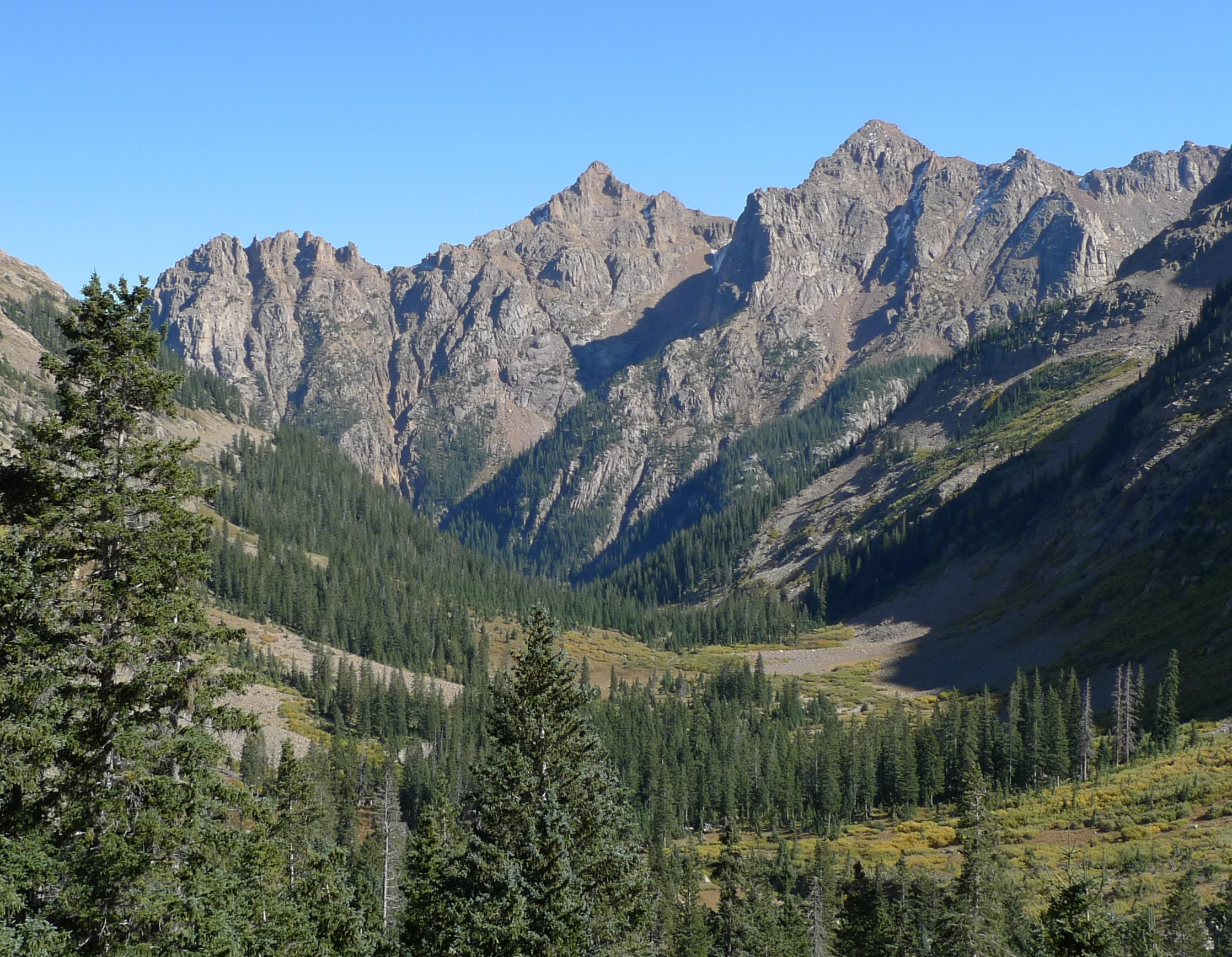
Organ Mountain (center) and Amherst Mountain (right)

Amherst Mountain is situated in the Needle Mountains which are a subrange of the San Juan Mountains. The remote mountain is located 30 miles (48 km) northeast of the community of Durango and set in the Weminuche Wilderness on land managed by San Juan National Forest. Precipitation runoff from the mountain's slopes drains to Vallecito Creek which is a tributary of the Los Pinos River. Topographic relief is significant as the summit rises 4,165 feet (1,269 m) above Vallecito Creek in 2 miles (3.2 km) and nearly 3,000 feet (914 m) above Johnson Creek in 1 mile (1.6 km). The mountain's toponym has been officially adopted by the United States Board on Geographic Names, and has been recorded in publications since at least 1906.

== Climate ==
According to the Köppen climate classification system, Amherst Mountain is located in an alpine subarctic climate zone with cold, snowy winters, and cool to warm summers. Due to its altitude, it receives precipitation all year, as snow in winter, and as thunderstorms in summer, with a dry period in late spring.

== See also ==
- List of mountain peaks of Colorado
- Thirteener
