= Jeffery Amherst, 5th Earl Amherst =

British pilot and airline director (1896–1993)

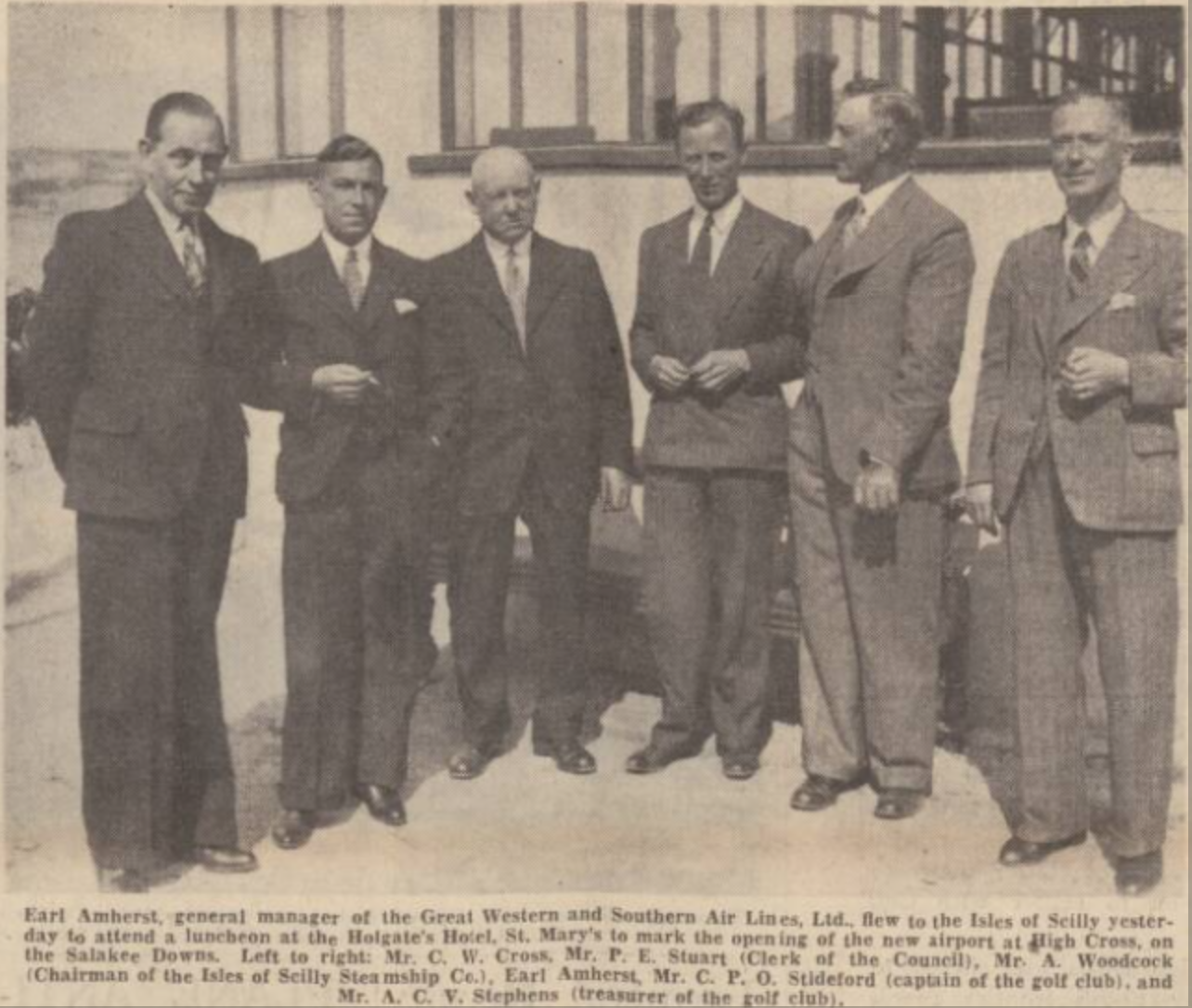
Western Morning News. Thursday 17 August 1939. Earl Amherst, general manager of the Great Western and Southern Air Lines Ltd., marking the opening of St Mary's Airport, Isles of Scilly. Left to right: Mr. C.W. Cross, Mr. P.E. Stuart (Clerk of the Council), Mr. A. Woodcock (Chairman of the Isles of Scilly Steamship Co.), Earl Amherst, Mr. C.P.O. Stideford (captain of the golf club), and Mr. A.C.V. Stephens (treasurer of the golf club).

Jeffery John Archer Amherst, 5th Earl Amherst MC (13 December 1896 – 4 March 1993), styled Viscount Holmesdale between 1910 and 1927, was a British pilot and airline director. He was the sometime lover, often travelling companion, and long-time friend of the playwright and actor Noël Coward.

Born in Paddington, London, in December 1896, Amherst was the eldest son of Hugh Amherst, 4th Earl Amherst and the Honourable Eleanor Clementina St Aubyn, daughter of John St Aubyn, 1st Baron St Levan. He was educated at Eton and the Royal Military College, Sandhurst. He was commissioned into the Coldstream Guards and fought in the First World War, where he was wounded, mentioned in despatches and awarded the Military Cross. He resigned his commission in the Coldstream Guards in February 1921.

Amherst was homosexual, and a friend and companion to Noël Coward, who once described him as "gay and a trifle strained", with "a certain quality of secrecy . . . as though he knew many things too closely". The two had originally met in 1920 at a party thrown by the actor and songwriter Ivor Novello. They travelled together to New York in June 1921, Coward's first trip to America. They later travelled throughout South America, where Amherst took some of the earliest known 16mm movies of Coward on their travels.

Amherst succeeded his father in the earldom in 1927. But he continued to make his own way in business and his social life. He worked as a bond salesman with Harris Forbes, as a pilot and airline general manager and was a director of British European Airways. In 1976 he published his autobiography, Wandering Abroad. He was a regular contributor in the House of Lords, making his maiden speech in 1934. His last recorded speech was in February 1985.

Lord Amherst died in March 1993, aged 96. As he had never married and had no children, his titles became extinct on his death.

Peerage of the United Kingdom
Preceded by Hugh Amherst	Earl Amherst; 1927–1993; Member of the House of Lords (1927–1993)	Extinct
Honorary titles
Preceded by The Marquess of Downshire	Longest-serving member in the House of Lords; 1989–1993	Succeeded by The Lord Oranmore and Browne
