= Josceline Amherst =

Australian politician

The Honourable Josceline Amherst
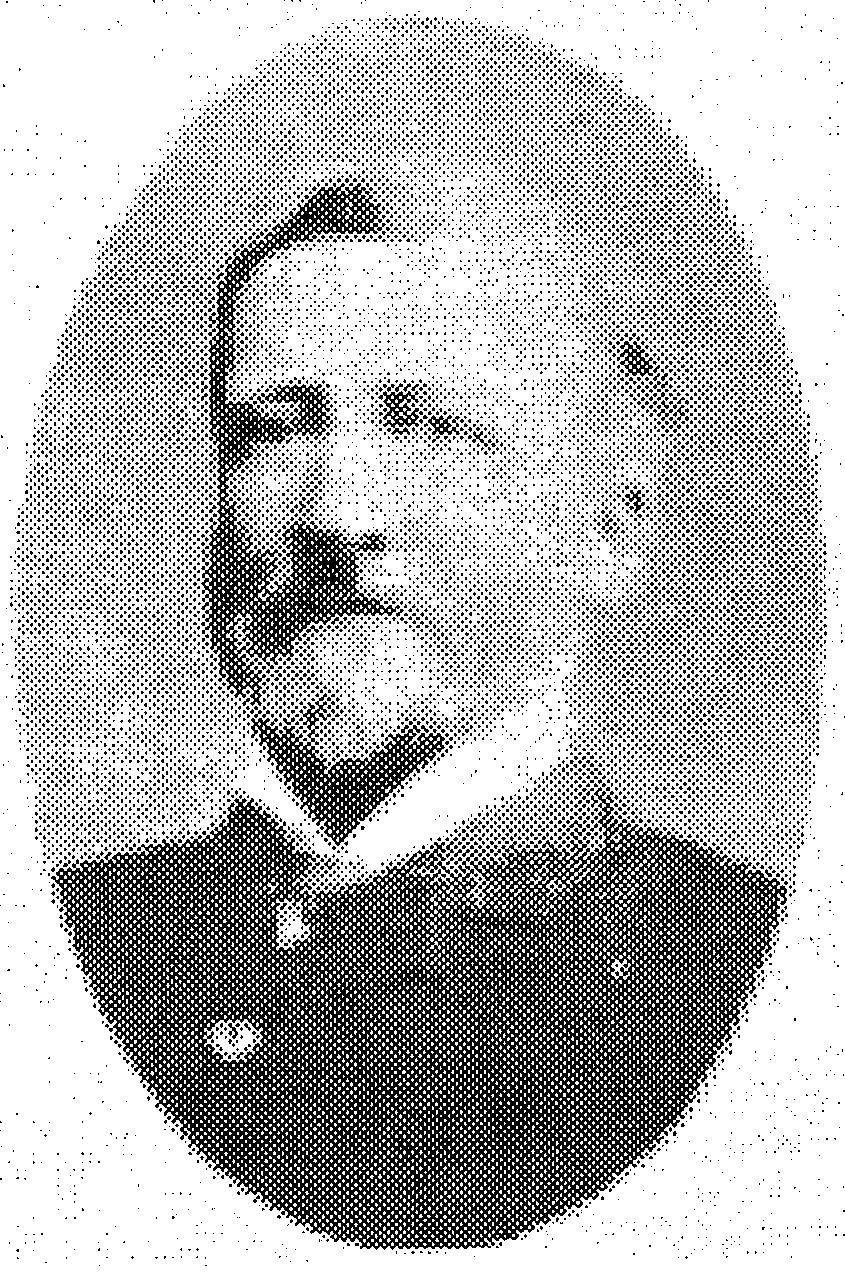

Personal information
- Full name: Josceline George Herbert Amherst
- Born: 7 June 1846; Westminster, London, England
- Died: 1 February 1900 (aged 53); Darlington, Western Australia
- Batting: Right-handed
- Bowling: Slow

Domestic team information
- Years: Team
- 1866: Marylebone Cricket Club

Career statistics
Competition	First-class
Matches	2
Runs scored	15
Batting average	3.75
100s/50s	0/0
Top score	7
Balls bowled	66
Wickets	3
Bowling average	12
5 wickets in innings	0
10 wickets in match	0
Best bowling	2/26
Catches/stumpings	0/–
- Source: CricketArchive, 9 August 2008

Josceline George Herbert Amherst (7 June 1846 – 1 February 1900) was a member of the first Western Australian Legislative Council under responsible government. He also played first-class cricket.

== Biography ==
Josceline Amherst was born in Westminster in London on 7 June 1846, the fifth son of William Pitt Amherst, 2nd Earl Amherst. He was educated at Eton College, matriculated to Christ Church, Oxford but did not graduate. He became a barrister of the Inner Temple in 1874.

As a cricketer he played his games for Marylebone Cricket Club and the Gentlemen of Kent. His highest score of 7 came when playing for Marylebone Cricket Club in the match against Hampshire County Cricket Club. His best bowling of 2/26 came when playing for the Gentlemen of Kent in the match against the Gentlemen of Marylebone Cricket Club.

From 1881 to 1883, Amherst was private secretary to Sir William Des Vœux, Governor of Fiji. In June 1885, he emigrated to Western Australia, where he took up an appointment as private secretary to Governor Frederick Broome and Clerk to the Executive Council, which positions he held until 1887. He then returned to London for a brief period, arriving back in Western Australia in March 1888. He then established himself on his Holmesdale property at Darlington. On 24 December 1890, he was nominated by the governor to Western Australia's first Legislative Council under responsible government. He remained on the council until June 1894, when it became elective.

In 1897 Amherst went into partnership with a Dr A. R. Waylen, establishing a vineyard at Smith's Mill. He later became President of the Swan Vine and Fruit Growers Association. In 1897 he also became a director of the WA Mortgage and Agency Company. For a time he was also President of the Royal Agricultural Society in Western Australia. He died at Darlington on 1 February 1900. He was unmarried.
