= William Amherst, 2nd Earl Amherst =

British peer

Earl Amherst in the c1870s.

William Pitt Amherst, 2nd Earl Amherst (3 September 1805 – 26 March 1886), styled Viscount Holmesdale between 1826 and 1857, was a British peer.

Amherst was born at Lower Grosvenor Street, London, the son of William Amherst, 1st Earl Amherst, by his first wife Sarah, daughter of Andrew Archer, 2nd Baron Archer. He was educated at Westminster School and Christ Church, Oxford. He became known by the courtesy title Viscount Holmesdale when his father was elevated to an earldom in 1826. In 1829 he was returned to parliament as one of two representatives for East Grinstead, a seat he held until 1832, when the constituency was abolished by the Great Reform Act. He never returned to the House of Commons. In 1857 he succeeded his father in the earldom and took his seat in the House of Lords.

Lord Amherst married Gertrude, daughter of the Right Reverend Hugh Percy, in 1834. They had six sons and five daughters, including William Amherst and Josceline Amherst. He died at Montreal Park, Sevenoaks, Kent, in March 1886, aged 80. He was succeeded in his titles by his eldest son, William. The Countess Amherst died at Rutland Gate, London, in April 1890, aged 75.

Parliament of the United Kingdom
Preceded by Lord Strathavon; Hon. Charles Jenkinson	Member of Parliament for East Grinstead; 1829–1832; With: Lord Strathavon 1829–1830; Frederick Richard West 1830–1832	Constituency abolished
Peerage of the United Kingdom
Preceded by William Pitt Amherst	Earl Amherst; 1857–1886	Succeeded by William Archer Amherst
Peerage of Great Britain
Preceded by William Pitt Amherst	Baron Amherst (descended by acceleration); 1857–1880	Succeeded by William Archer Amherst
