= South Amherst High School =

South Amherst High/Middle School
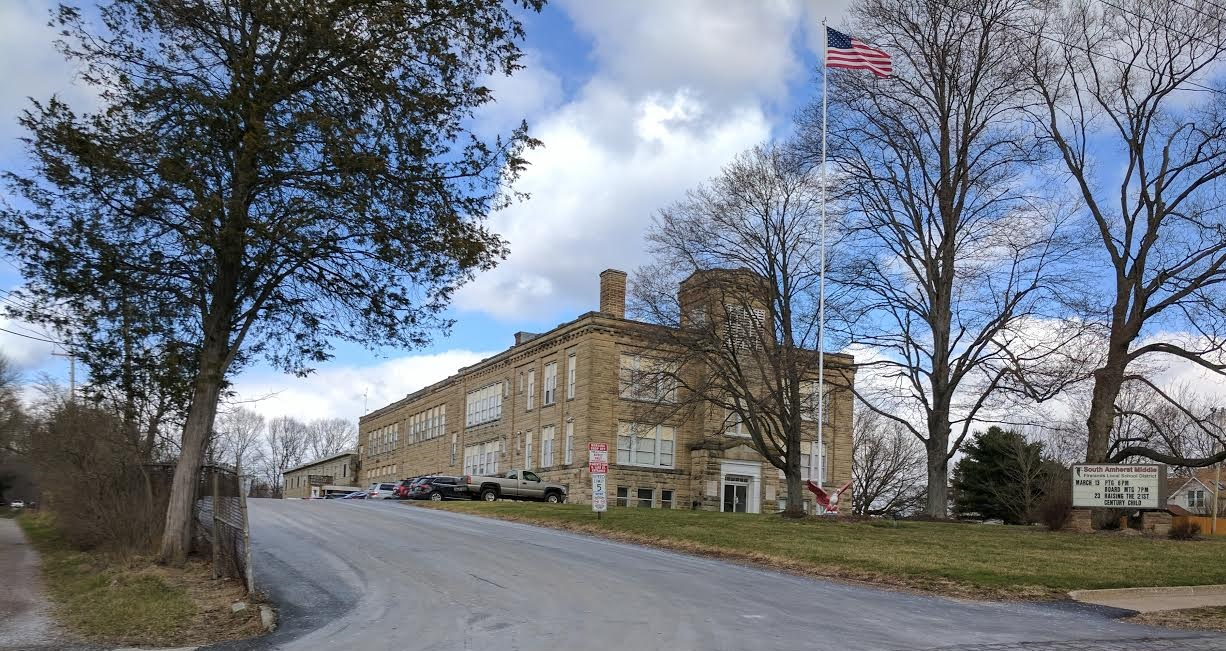

Location
- 152 W Main St. South Amherst, (Lorain County), Ohio 44001; United States

Information
- Type: Public, Coeducational high school
- Closed: 2022
- Grades: 9-12
- Colors: Green & White
- Athletics conference: Inland Conference (1956-1988); Lorain County League (1924-1961)
- Team name: Cavaliers
- Yearbook: Cavalier

South Amherst High School was a public co-ed high school located in South Amherst, Ohio. It mainly served the village and the immediate area around it. The building that most recently served as the middle school was built in 1910 and no longer serves as a school due to school closing as the new Firelands High School was on its way to being opened. The South Amherst Middle School or SAMS used to feed into the Firelands Local School District. Firelands High School.

The South Amherst Cavaliers originally competed in the Lorain County League from 1924 to 1961 and then began a dual-membership with the Inland Conference in 1956 that ultimately became their league home until 1988, which is when both the league disbanded and the school itself closed.

Due to finances and several failed levies, the South Amherst Board of Education began looking to merge their district with a neighboring one in the 1980s. In December 1987, Firelands Local School District approved a measure to absorb South Amherst's district, which was agreed upon by both districts in early 1988. When a petition to prevent the merger failed in March of that year, the absorption of South Amherst's district by Firelands took effect on July 1, 1988, which was the first day of the 1988–1989 school year.
