= Middle Amherst Cove =

Settlement in Newfoundland and Labrador, Canada

Coordinates: 48.564°N 53.221°W

Location of Middle Amherst Cove in Newfoundland and Labrador

Middle Amherst Cove is a settlement in the Canadian province of Newfoundland and Labrador.
