= Amherst Street =

Amherst Street may refer to:

- Amherst Street (Kolkata), a neighborhood in northern Kolkata, India
- Amherst Road (former name of Kyaikkhami Road), a road in Moulmein (now Mawlamyine)
- Amherst Street (Montreal), a street in Montreal
- Amherst Street (New York), a street in New York:
  - Amherst Street (Metro Rail), a Metro Rail station at the north end of Buffalo, New York
