= West Amherst, Nova Scotia =

Community in Hants County, Nova Scotia

Coordinates: 45°48′52″N 64°14′39.06″W

West Amherst in Nova Scotia

West Amherst is a small community in the Canadian province of Nova Scotia, located in Hants County.
