= Jeffery Amherst, 1st Baron Amherst =

British Army general (1717–1797)

Field Marshal The Right Honourable The Lord Amherst KB
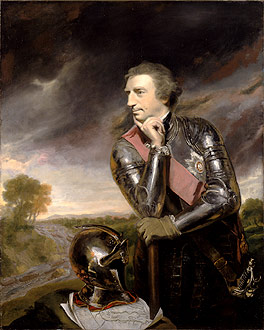
- Portrait of Jeffery Amherst by Joshua Reynolds, 1765

Commander-in-Chief, North America
- In office 1758–1763
- Preceded by: James Abercombie
- Succeeded by: Thomas Gage

Crown Governor of Virginia
- In office 1759–1768
- Monarchs: George II; George III
- Preceded by: The Earl of Loudoun
- Succeeded by: The Lord Botetourt

Governor of the Province of Quebec
- In office 1760–1763
- Monarch: George III
- Preceded by: Post created, replacing the French post of Governor General of New France
- Succeeded by: James Murray

Personal details
- Born: 29 January 1717 Sevenoaks, Kent, England, Great Britain
- Died: 3 August 1797 (aged 80) Sevenoaks, Kent, England, Great Britain
- Resting place: St Nicholas churchyard, Kent, England, Great Britain
- Awards: Order of the Bath

Military service
- Allegiance: Kingdom of Great Britain
- Branch/service: British Army
- Years of service: 1735–1795
- Rank: Field marshal
- Commands: 15th Regiment of Foot; North America; 62nd (Royal American) Regiment; 3rd Regiment of Foot; Lieutenant-General of the Ordnance; Commander-in-Chief of the Forces; 2nd Troop Horse Grenadier Guards; The Queen's Troop of Horse Guards; 2nd Regiment of Life Guards
- Battles/wars: War of the Austrian Succession; Seven Years' War; Pontiac's Rebellion; American Revolutionary War; French Revolutionary Wars

Field Marshal Jeffery (Note: Lord Amherst spelled his name Jeffery, but Jeffrey and Geoffrey sometimes appear in sources discussing him.) Amherst, 1st Baron Amherst (29 January 1717 – 3 August 1797) was a British Army officer and Commander-in-Chief of the Forces. He is credited as one of the architects of Great Britain's successful campaign to conquer the territory of New France from France during the Seven Years' War. He was also the first British governor general in the territories that eventually came to be known as Canada.

Son of a lawyer from Kent, Amherst enlisted in the Grenadier Guards in 1735 and first saw active service during the War of the Austrian Succession. Early in the Seven Years' War, he conducted the successful siege at Louisbourg, and was appointed commander-in-chief in North America in its wake. Under his command, British Armed forces went on to capture Quebec City, Montreal and several major city fortresses, bringing an end to French rule in North America. He was named Governor-General of British North America in 1760 and received a knighthood a year later.

In early 1763, in response to Amherst's policies, a confederation of American Indians launched what came to be known as Pontiac's War. His handling of the uprising provoked criticism and led to his recall to Great Britain, and he was subsequently replaced as commander-in-chief in North America by British Army Officer Thomas Gage. Amherst was created a peer in 1776, and served as commander-in-chief of the British Army on two occasions, under which capacity he oversaw the suppression of the anti-Catholic Gordon Riots in London. He retired a field marshal in 1796 and died a year later at the age of 80.

Numerous places in Canada and the United States are named after Amherst.

His modern legacy often focuses on the infamy of his expressed desire and success in spreading smallpox among Native Americans, by underhandedly giving them a gift of blankets, secretly contaminated with smallpox, during Pontiac's War.

== Early life ==
The son of Jeffrey Amherst (d. 1750), a Kentish lawyer, and Elizabeth Amherst (née Kerrill), Jeffery Amherst was born in Sevenoaks, England, on 29 January 1717. At an early age, he became a page to the Duke of Dorset. Amherst became an ensign in the Grenadier Guards in 1735.

Amherst served in the War of the Austrian Succession becoming an aide to General John Ligonier and participating in the Battle of Dettingen in June 1743 and the Battle of Fontenoy in May 1745. Promoted to lieutenant colonel on 25 December 1745, he also saw action at the Battle of Rocoux in October 1746. He then became an aide to the Duke of Cumberland, the commander of the British forces, and saw further action at the Battle of Lauffeld in July 1747.

== Seven Years' War ==
=== Germany ===
In February 1756, Amherst was appointed commissar to the German Hessian forces that had been assembled to defend Hanover as part of the Army of Observation: as it appeared likely a French invasion attempt against Great Britain itself was imminent, Amherst was ordered in April to arrange the transportation of thousands of the Germans to southern England to bolster Britain's defences. He was made colonel of the 15th Regiment of Foot on 12 June 1756. By 1757 as the immediate danger to Britain had passed as the troops were moved back to Hanover to join a growing army under the Duke of Cumberland and Amherst fought with the Hessians under Cumberland's command at the Battle of Hastenbeck in July 1757: the Allied defeat there forced the army into a steady retreat northwards to Stade near the North Sea coast.

Amherst was left dispirited by the retreat and by the Convention of Klosterzeven by which Hanover agreed to withdraw from the war: he began to prepare to disband the Hessian troops under his command, only to receive word that the Convention had been repudiated and the Allied force was being reformed.

=== French and Indian War ===
Amherst had gained fame during the Seven Years' War, particularly in the North American campaign, known in the United States as the French and Indian War when he led the British attack on Louisbourg on Cape Breton Island in June 1758.

In the wake of this action, he was appointed commander-in-chief of the British army in North America and colonel-in-chief of the 60th (Royal American) Regiment in September 1758. Amherst then led an army against French troops on Lake Champlain, where he captured Fort Ticonderoga in July 1759, while another army under William Johnson took Niagara also in July 1759 and James Wolfe besieged and eventually captured Quebec City with a third army in September 1759. Amherst served as the nominal Crown Governor of Virginia from 12 September 1759.

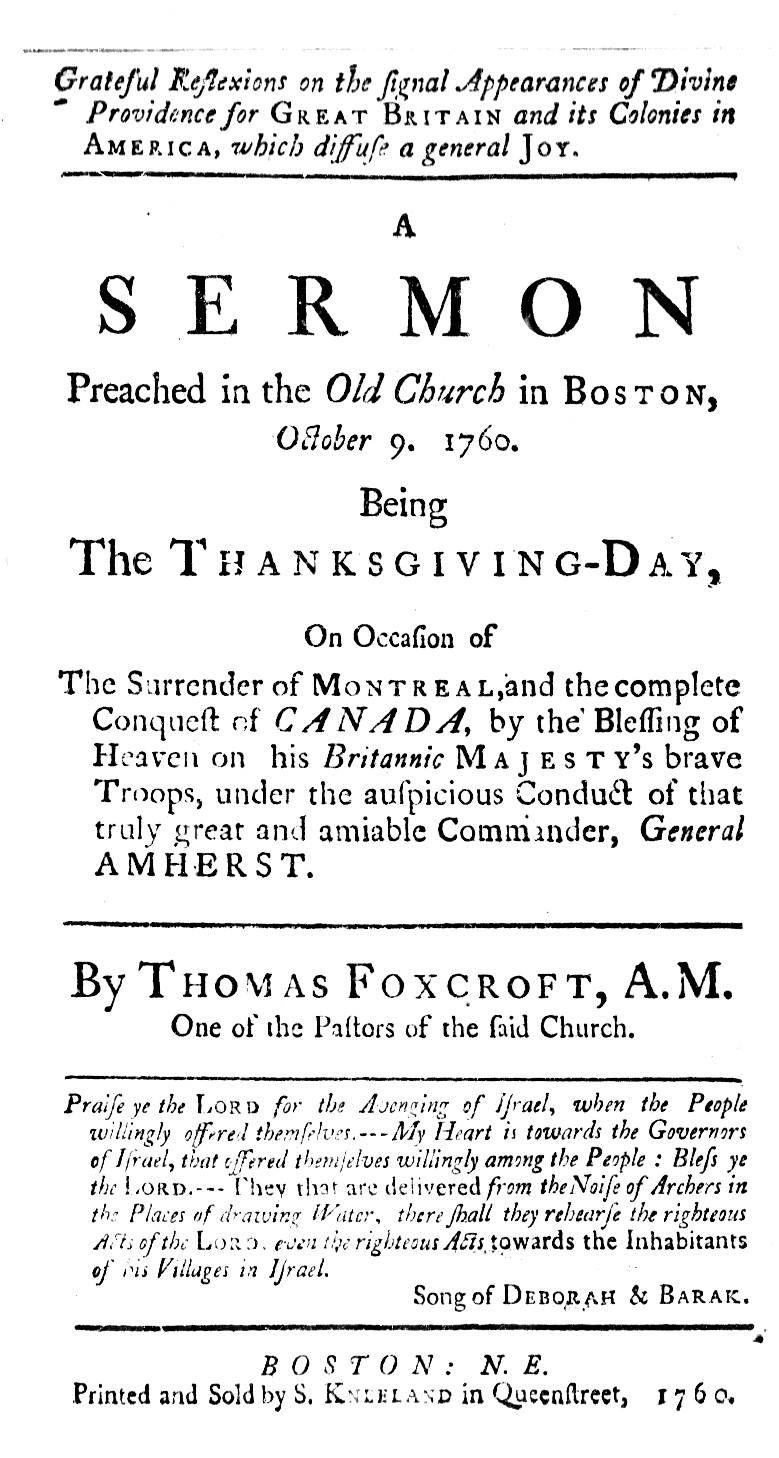
Grateful Reflexions on the Signal Appearances of Divine Providence for Great Britain and its Colonies in America. 1760

From July 1760, Amherst led an army down the Saint Lawrence River from Fort Oswego, joined with Brigadier Murray from Quebec and Brigadier Haviland from Ile-aux-Noix in a three-way pincer, and captured Montreal, ending French colonial rule in North America on 8 September. He infuriated the French commanders by refusing them the honours of war; the Chevalier de Lévis burned the colours rather than surrendering them, to highlight his differences with Vaudreuil for later political advantage back in France.

The British settlers were relieved and proclaimed a day of thanksgiving. Boston newspapers recount how the occasion was celebrated with a parade, a grand dinner in Faneuil Hall, music, bonfires, and firing of cannon. The Rev. Thomas Foxcroft of the First Church in Boston offered thus:

The Lord hath done great things for us, whereof we are glad... Long had it been the common opinion, Delenda est Carthago, Canada must be conquered, or we could hope for no lasting quiet in these parts; and now, through the good hand of our God upon us, we see the happy day of its accomplishment. We behold His Majesty's victorious troops treading upon the high places of the enemy, their last fortress delivered up, and the whole country surrendered to the King of Britain in the person of his general, the intrepid, the serene, the successful Amherst.

In recognition of this victory, Amherst was appointed Governor-General of British North America in September 1760 and promoted to major-general on 29 November 1760. He was appointed Knight of the Order of the Bath on 11 April 1761.

From his base at New York, Amherst oversaw the dispatch of troops under Monckton and Haviland to take part in British expeditions in the West Indies that led to the British capture of Dominica in 1761 and Martinique and Cuba in 1762.

== Pontiac's War ==
The uprising of many American Indian tribes in the Ohio Valley and Great Lakes region, also commonly referred to as Pontiac's War after one of its most notable leaders, began in early 1763. From 1753, when the French first invaded the territory, to February 1763, when peace was formally declared between the English and French, the Six Nations and tenant tribes always maintained that both the French and the British must remain east of the Allegheny Mountains. After the British failed to keep their word to withdraw from the Ohio and Allegheny valleys, a loose confederation of American Indian tribes including the Lenape (also Delaware), the Shawnee, the Seneca, the Mingo, the Mohican, the Miami, the Odawa (also Ottowa) and the Wyandot, who were opposed to British post-war occupation of the region, banded together in an effort to drive the British out of their territory.

One of the most infamous and well-documented issues during Pontiac's War was the use of biological warfare against American Indians and Amherst's role in supporting it. Colonel Henry Bouquet, the commander of Fort Pitt, ordered smallpox-infested blankets to be given to Amercian Indians when a group of them laid siege to the fortification in June 1763. During a parley in midst of the siege on 24 June 1763, Captain Simeon Ecuyer gave representatives of the besieging Lenape two blankets and a handkerchief enclosed in small metal boxes that had been exposed to smallpox, in an attempt to spread the disease to the Natives in order to end the siege. William Trent, the trader turned militia commander who had come up with the plan, sent an invoice to the British colonial authorities in North America indicating that the purpose of giving the blankets was "to Convey the Smallpox to the Indians." The invoice was approved by Thomas Gage, then serving as Commander-in-Chief, North America. Reporting on parleys with Lenape chiefs on 24 June, Trent wrote: '[We] gave them two Blankets and an Handkerchief out of the Small Pox Hospital. I hope it will have the desired effect.' The military hospital records confirm that two blankets and handkerchiefs were 'taken from people in the Hospital to Convey the Smallpox to the Indians.' The fort commander paid for these items, which he certified 'were had for the uses above mentioned.' A reported outbreak that began the spring before left as many as one hundred Native Americans dead in Ohio Country from 1763 to 1764. It is not clear, however, whether the smallpox was a result of the Fort Pitt incident or the virus was already present among the Lenape as outbreaks recurred every dozen or so years and the delegates were met again later and they seemingly had not contracted smallpox.

A month later the use of smallpox blankets was discussed by Amherst himself in letters to Bouquet. Amherst, having learned that smallpox had broken out among the garrison at Fort Pitt, and after learning of the loss of his forts at Venango, Le Boeuf and Presqu'Isle, wrote to Colonel Bouquet:

Could it not be contrived to send the small pox among the disaffected tribes of Indians? We must on this occasion use every stratagem in our power to reduce them.

Bouquet, who was already marching to relieve Fort Pitt from the siege, agreed with this suggestion in a postscript when he responded to Amherst just days later on 13 July 1763:

P.S. I will try to inocculate [sic] the Indians by means of Blankets that may fall in their hands, taking care however not to get the disease myself. As it is pity to oppose good men against them, I wish we could make use of the Spaniard's Method, and hunt them with English Dogs. Supported by Rangers, and some Light Horse, who would I think effectively extirpate or remove that Vermine.

In response, also in a postscript, Amherst replied:

P.S. You will Do well to try to Innoculate [sic] the Indians by means of Blankets, as well as to try Every other method that can serve to Extirpate this Execrable Race. I should be very glad your Scheme for Hunting them Down by Dogs could take Effect, but England is at too great a Distance to think of that at present.

Amherst was summoned home, ostensibly so that he could be consulted on future military plans in North America, and was replaced pro tem as Commander-in-Chief, North America by Thomas Gage. Amherst expected to be praised for his conquest of Canada, however, once in London, he was instead asked to account for the recent Native American rebellion. He was forced to defend his conduct, and faced complaints made by William Johnson and George Croghan, who lobbied the Board of Trade for his removal and permanent replacement by Gage. He was also severely criticised by military subordinates on both sides of the Atlantic. Nevertheless, Amherst was promoted to lieutenant-general on 26 March 1765.

In 1768, King George III decreed that British colonial governors would be required to primarily reside in the area which they governed. Amherst, the Governor of Virginia despite having never set foot in the colony, refused to leave England and was thus dismissed from the post in July. In anger, he resigned his commission in the army, but was quickly convinced to rescind this decision, and then became colonel of the 3rd Regiment of Foot in November 1768.

On 22 October 1772, Amherst was appointed Lieutenant-General of the Ordnance, and he soon gained the confidence of King George, who had initially hoped the position would go to a member of the Royal Family. On 6 November 1772, he became a member of the Privy Council.

== Commander-in-Chief ==
=== American War of Independence ===
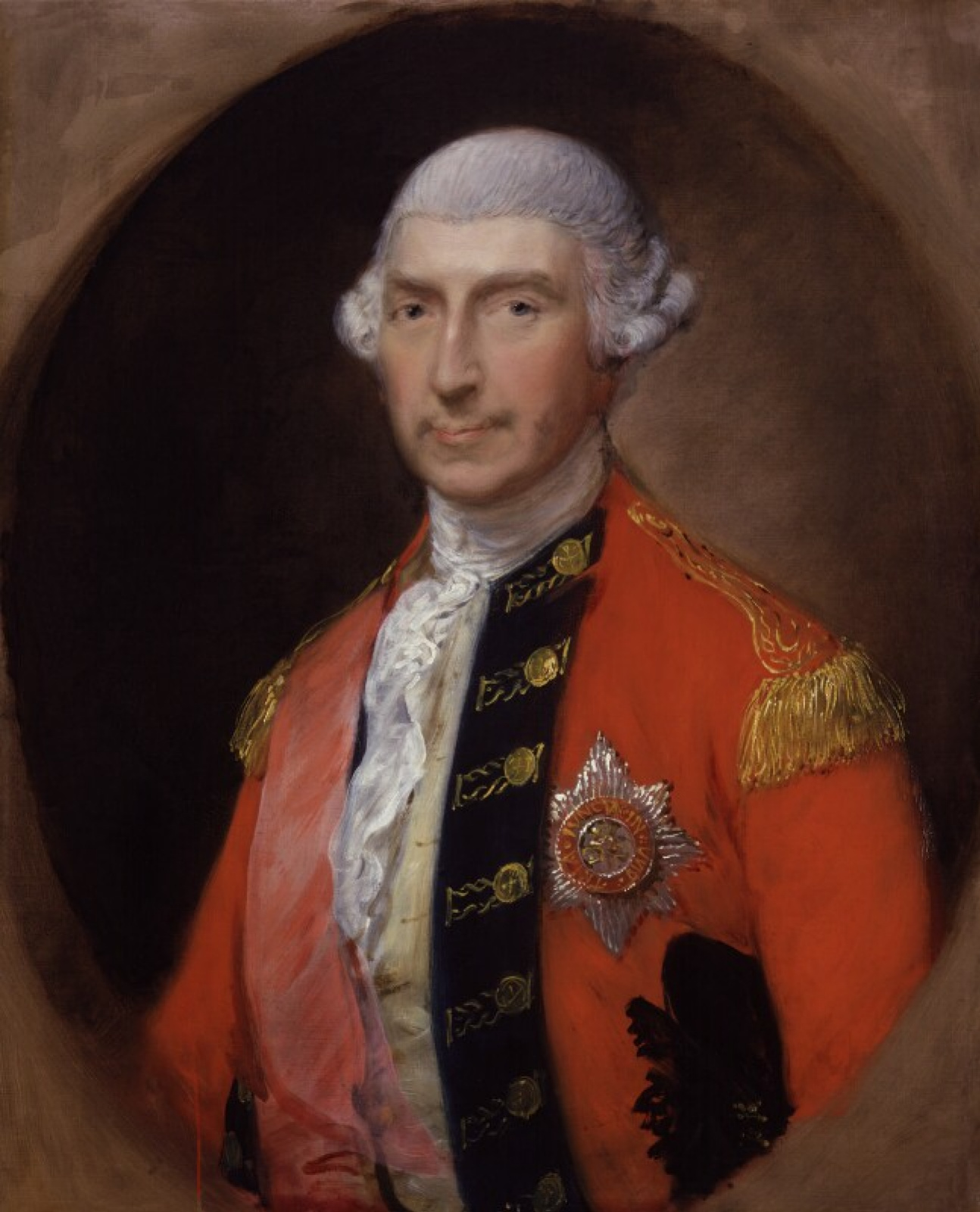
Portrait of Jeffery Amherst by Thomas Gainsborough, 1780. Amherst was Commander-in Chief during the response to threatened invasion by the Armada of 1779 during the American War of Independence.

Amherst was raised to the peerage on 14 May 1776, as Baron Amherst, of Holmesdale in the County of Kent. On 24 March 1778 he was promoted to full general and, in April 1778, he became Commander-in-Chief of the Forces, which gave him a seat in the Cabinet.

In 1778, when the British commander in North America, William Howe, requested to be relieved, Amherst was considered as a replacement by the government: however, his insistence that it would require 75,000 troops to fully defeat the rebellion was not acceptable to the government, and Henry Clinton was instead chosen to take over from Howe in America. Following the British setback at Saratoga, Amherst successfully argued for a limited war in North America, keeping footholds along the coast, defending French Canada, East and West Florida, and the West Indies while putting more effort into the war at sea. On 7 November 1778 the King and Queen visited Amherst at his home, Montreal Park, in Kent and on 24 April 1779 he became colonel of the 2nd Troop of Horse Grenadier Guards.

A long-standing plan of France had been the concept of an invasion of Great Britain which they hoped would lead to a swift end to the war if it was successful: in 1779 Spain entered the war on the side of France, and the increasingly depleted state of British home forces made an invasion more appealing and Amherst organised Britain's land defences in anticipation of the invasion which never materialised.

=== Gordon Riots ===
In June 1780, Amherst oversaw the British army as they suppressed the anti-Catholic Gordon Riots in London. After the outbreak of rioting Amherst deployed the small London garrison of Horse and Foot Guards as well as he could but was hindered by the reluctance of the civil magistrates to authorise decisive action against the rioters.

Line troops and militia were brought in from surrounding counties, swelling the forces at Amherst's disposal to over 15,000, many of whom were quartered in tents in Hyde Park, and a form of martial law was declared, giving the troops the authority to fire on crowds if the Riot Act had first been read. Although order was eventually restored, Amherst was personally alarmed by the failure of the authorities to suppress the riots.

In the wake of the Gordon Riots, Amherst was forced to resign as Commander-in-Chief in February 1782 and was replaced by Henry Conway. On 23 March 1782 he became captain and colonel of the 2nd Troop of Horse Guards.

== Later life ==
=== French Revolutionary Wars ===
On 8 July 1788, he became colonel of the 2nd Regiment of Life Guards and on 30 August 1788 he was created Baron Amherst (this time with the territorial designation of Montreal in the County of Kent) with a special provision that would allow this title to pass to his nephew (as Amherst was childless, the Holmesdale title became extinct upon his death).

With the advent of the French Revolutionary Wars, Amherst was recalled as Commander-in-Chief of the Forces in January 1793: however is generally criticised for allowing the armed forces to slide into acute decline, a direct cause of the failure of the early campaigns in the Low Countries: Pitt the Younger said of him "his age, and perhaps his natural temper, are little suited to the activity and the energy which the present moment calls for". Horace Walpole called him "that log of wood whose stupidity and incapacity are past belief". "He allowed innumerable abuses to grow up in the army… He kept his command, though almost in his dotage, with a tenacity that cannot be too much censured".

=== Family and death ===
In 1753 he married Jane Dalison (1723–1765). Following her death he married Elizabeth Cary (1740–1830), daughter of Lieutenant General George Cary (1712–1792), who later became Lady Amherst of Holmesdale, on 26 March 1767. There were no children by either marriage. He retired from that post in February 1795, to be replaced by the Duke of York, and was promoted to the rank of field marshal on 30 July 1796. He retired to his home at Montreal Park and died on 3 August 1797. He was buried in the Parish Church at Sevenoaks.

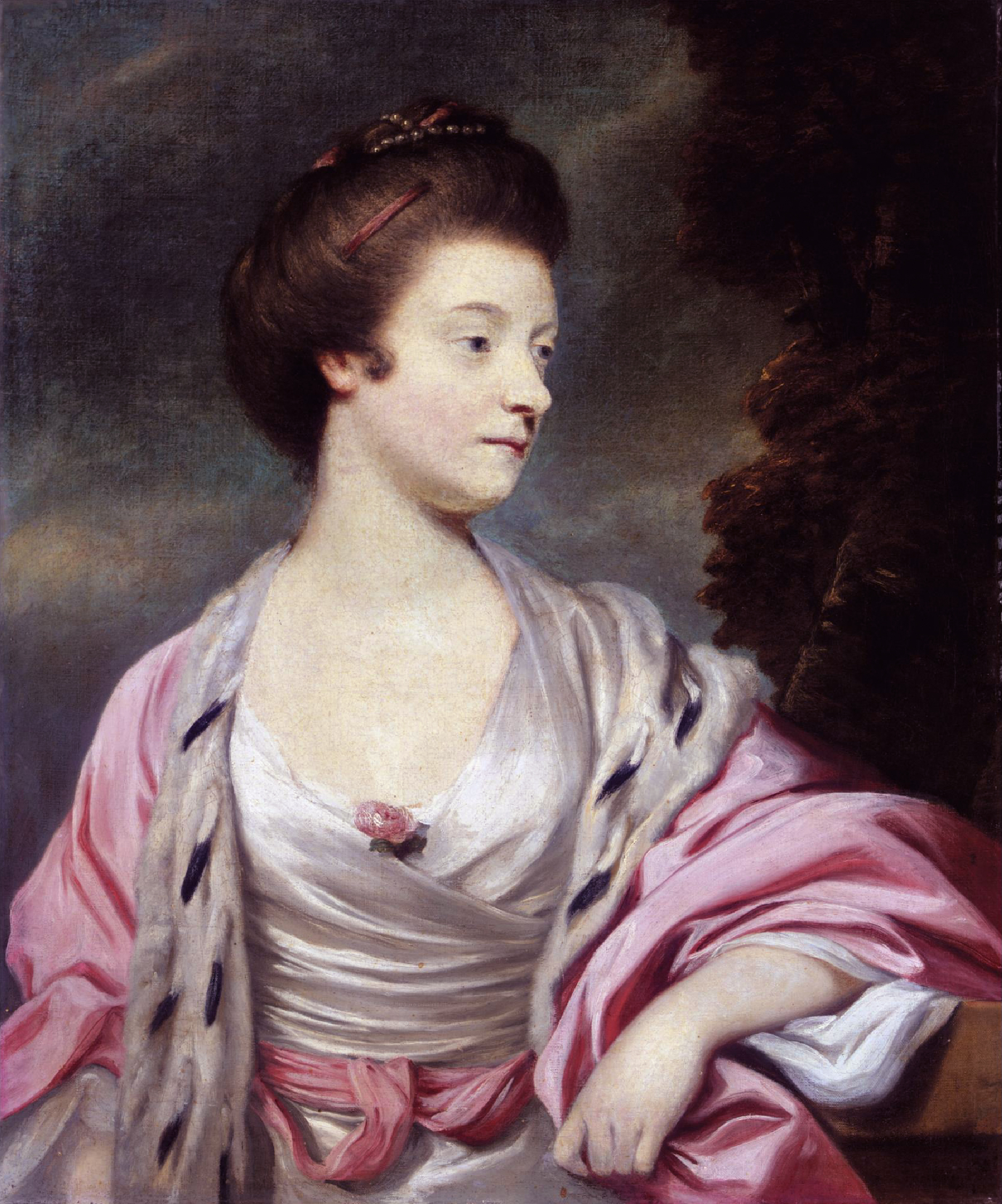
On 26 March 1767 Jeffrey Amherst married Elizabeth, daughter of General George Cary (portrait by Sir Joshua Reynolds, 1767).

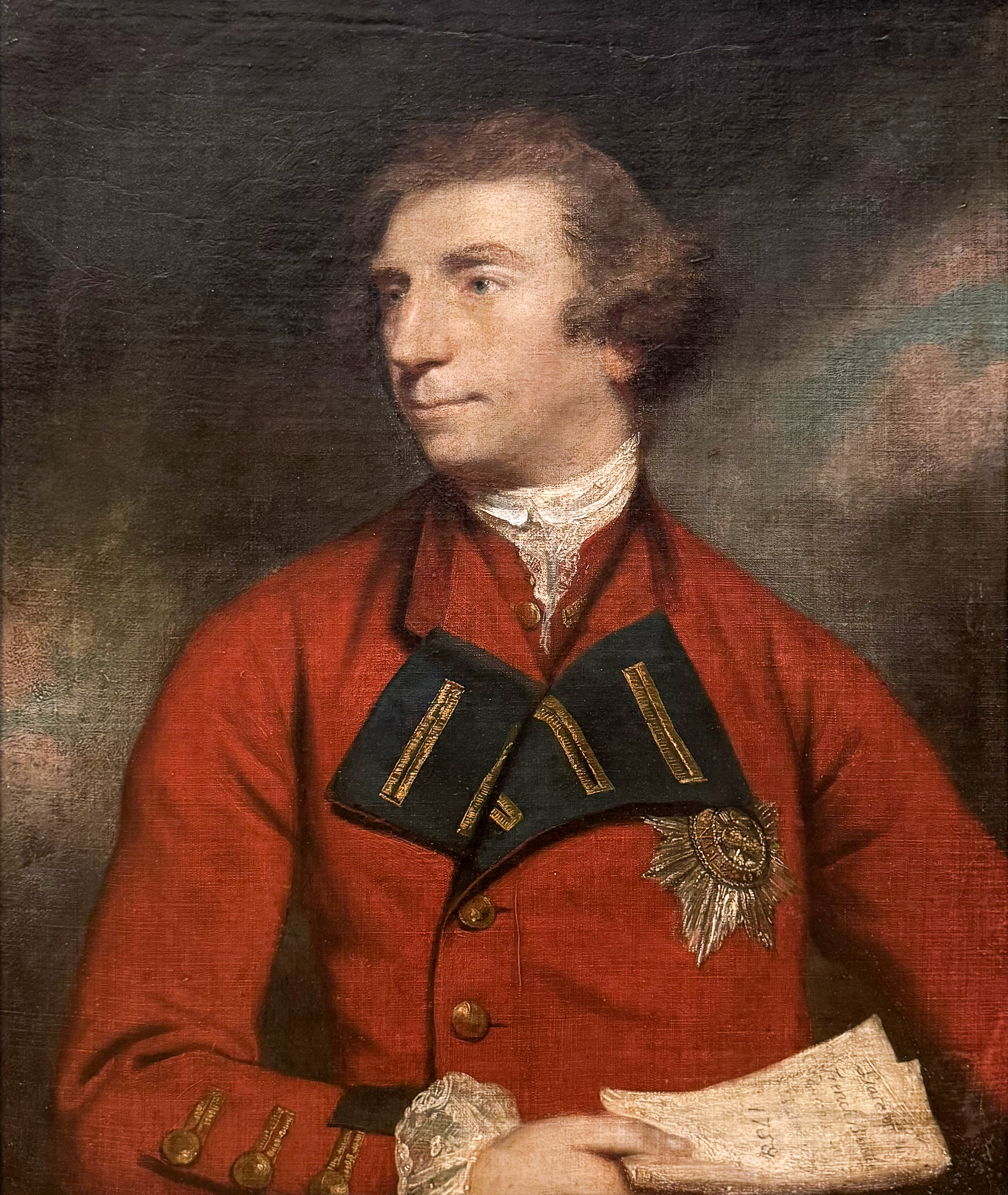
Jeffrey Amherst, 1st Baron Amherst, by Sir Joshua Reynolds.

== Legacy ==
Several places in the United States and Canada have been named in honor of him: Amherst Island, Ontario, Amherstburg, Ontario (location of General Amherst High School), Amherst, Massachusetts (location of the University of Massachusetts Amherst, Hampshire College and Amherst College), Amherst, New Hampshire, Amherst, Nova Scotia, Amherst, New York, Amherst, Maine, and Amherst County, Virginia.

=== Proposed monument ===
In 1913, the Amherst College Alumni Association proposed the erection of a large equestrian statue of Lord Jeffery Amherst on the college campus. However, the project was never realized due to a lack of funding and structural planning. The idea was briefly revived in 1930 when sculptor Sidney Biehler Waugh proposed a miniature equestrian figure of Amherst, but this proposal also failed to materialize.

== See also ==
- List of governors general of Canada
- Turtleheart
- History of Canada
- History of the United States
- British America

== Explanatory notes ==
Military offices
Preceded by John Jordan	Colonel of the 15th Regiment of Foot; 1756–1779	Succeeded by Charles Hotham
Preceded by James Abercrombie	Commander-in-Chief, North America; 1758–1763	Succeeded by Thomas Gage
Preceded by James Abercrombie	Colonel-in-Chief of the 60th (Royal American) Regiment of Foot; 1758–1768	Succeeded by Thomas Gage
Preceded by Ralph Burton	Colonel of the 3rd Regiment of Foot; 1768–1779	Succeeded by William Style
Preceded by Thomas Gage	Colonel-in-Chief of the 60th (Royal American) Regiment of Foot; 1768–1797	Succeeded by Prince Frederick, Duke of York and Albany
Preceded by Richard Lyttelton	Governor of Guernsey; 1770–1797	Succeeded by Charles Grey
Preceded by Henry Seymour Conway	Lieutenant-General of the Ordnance; 1772–1782	Succeeded by William Howe
Vacant Title last held by Marquess of Granby	Commander-in-Chief of the Forces; 1778–1782	Succeeded by Henry Seymour Conway
Preceded by William Stanhope, 2nd Earl of Harrington	Captain and Colonel of the 2nd Troop Horse Grenadier Guards; 1779–1782	Succeeded by Prince Frederick
Preceded by Lord Robert Bertie	Captain and Colonel of The Queen's Troop of Horse Guards; 1782–1788	Became the 2nd Life Guards
New title	Colonel of the 2nd Regiment of Life Guards; 1788–1797	Succeeded by The Lord Cathcart
Preceded by Henry Seymour Conway	Commander-in-Chief of the Forces; 1793–1795	Succeeded by Prince Frederick, Duke of York and Albany
Government offices
Preceded by The Earl of Loudoun	Crown Governor of Virginia; 1759–1768	Succeeded by John Blair
Preceded by New Office or Commander-in-Chief, North America or Governor of New France, Pierre de Rigaud	Governor of the Province of Quebec; 1760–1763	Succeeded by James Murray
Peerage of Great Britain
New creation	Baron Amherst (of Holmesdale in the County of Kent); 1776–1797	Extinct
New creation	Baron Amherst (of Montreal in the County of Kent); 1788–1797	Succeeded by William Pitt Amherst
