= Earl Amherst =

Extinct earldom in the Peerage of the United Kingdom

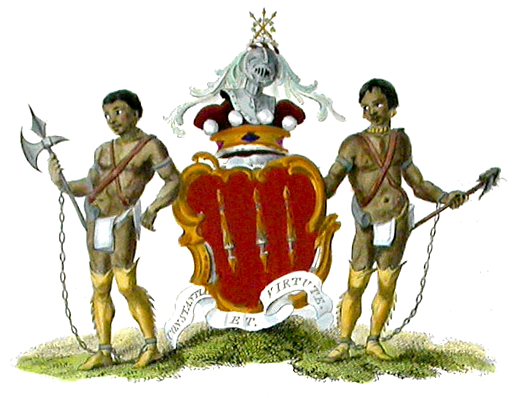
Arms of the Earls Amherst

Earl Amherst (/ˈæmərst/), of Arracan in the East Indies, was a title in the Peerage of the United Kingdom. It was created on 19 December 1826, for William Amherst, 2nd Baron Amherst, the Governor-General of India. He was made Viscount Holmesdale, in the County of Kent, at the same time, also in the Peerage of the United Kingdom.

Lord Amherst had succeeded his uncle Jeffery Amherst, 1st Baron Amherst, as second Baron Amherst in 1797. The latter was a distinguished military commander best known as one of the victors of the French and Indian War. In 1776, he was raised to the Peerage of Great Britain as Baron Amherst, of Holmesdale in the County of Kent, with normal remainder to heirs male of his body. In 1788, he was created Baron Amherst, of Montreal in the County of Kent, also in the Peerage of Great Britain, with special remainder to his nephew William Pitt Amherst and the heirs male of his body. The 1776 barony became extinct on his death in 1797, while he was succeeded in the 1778 barony as second Baron according to the special remainder by his nephew, William Amherst, who later was elevated to an earldom in 1826.

The first Earl was succeeded in 1857, by his second but eldest surviving son, the second Earl, who prior to his ennoblement had represented East Grinstead in the House of Commons. On his death in 1886 the titles passed to his eldest son, the third Earl. He was a soldier and politician, who in 1880 had been summoned to the House of Lords through a writ of acceleration in his father's junior title of Baron Amherst. He died childless in 1910 and was succeeded by his younger brother, the fourth Earl. The latter was one of the 112 peers who voted against the passing of the Parliament Act 1911. In 1927, he was succeeded by his son, the fifth Earl, on whose death in 1993, the titles became extinct.

John Amherst (c. 1718–1778), brother of the first baron, was an admiral in the Royal Navy. William Amherst, brother of the first baron and father of the first earl, was a Lieutenant-General in the British Army.

== Barons Amherst; first creation (1776) ==
With the territorial designation of Holmesdale in the County of Kent

- Jeffery Amherst, 1st Baron Amherst (1717–1797)

== Barons Amherst; second creation (1788) ==
With the territorial designation, of Montreal in the County of Kent

- Jeffery Amherst, 1st Baron Amherst (1717–1797)
- William Pitt Amherst, 2nd Baron Amherst (1773–1857) (created Earl Amherst in 1826)

== Earls Amherst (1826) ==
- William Pitt Amherst, 1st Earl Amherst (1773–1857)
  - Hon. Jeffrey Amherst (1802–1826)
- William Pitt Amherst, 2nd Earl Amherst (1805–1886)
- William Archer Amherst, 3rd Earl Amherst (1836–1910)
- Hugh Amherst, 4th Earl Amherst (1856–1927)
- Jeffery John Archer Amherst, 5th Earl Amherst (1896–1993)

== See also ==
- Amherst (surname)
