= Montreal Park =

Coordinates: 51.277°N 0.169°E

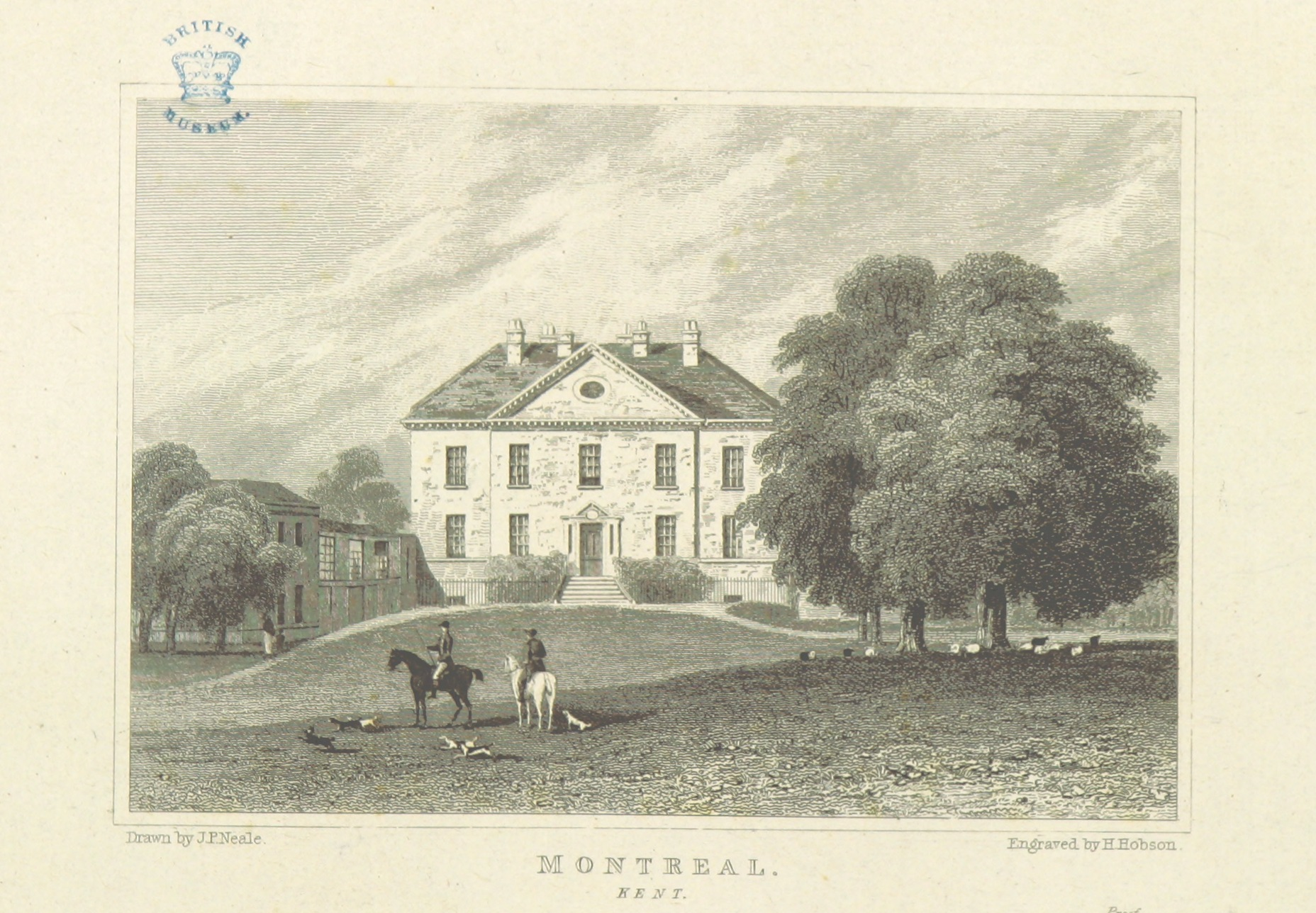
Montreal House circa 1820

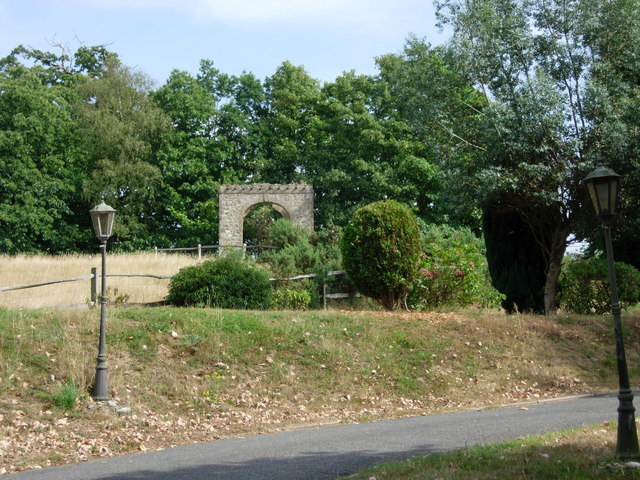
Summerhouse in Montreal Park

Montreal Park is a development in Sevenoaks in Kent which was formerly the home of Jeffery Amherst, 1st Baron Amherst, Commander-in-Chief of the Forces. It was named after his conquest of Montreal in 1760.

== History ==
In 1764 Lord Amherst returned home after his military successes during the Seven Years' War and commissioned a large house at Sevenoaks in Kent built in the Palladian style. On 30 August 1788 he was created, additional to his other title of Holmesdale, Baron Amherst of Montreal.

In 1926 the house was sold to Julius Runge, a businessman, who allowed it to fall into disrepair. The house was demolished in 1936 and replaced between 1952 and 1963 by a housing development promoted by a local builder, William Fasey. Montreal Park Lake is owned by the Holmesdale Angling and Conservation Society.

Today all that remains of Lord Amherst's residence is an octagonal gatehouse, a derelict stone summerhouse and large obelisk.

== The obelisk ==
The inscription on the obelisk reads:

To commemorate the providential and happy meeting of three brothers on this their Paternal ground on 25 January 1761 after a six years glorious war in which the three were successfully engaged in various climes, seasons and services.

Dedicated to that most able Statesman during whose Administration Cape Breton and Canada were conquered and from whose influence the British Arms derived a Degree of Lustre unparalleled in past ages.

Louisbour surrendered and Six French Battalions Prisoners of War 26 July 1758
Du Quesne taken possession of 24 November 1758
Niagara surrendered 25 July 1759
Ticonderoga taken possession of 26 July 1759
Crown Point taken possession of 4 August 1759
Quebec capitulated 18 September 1759
Fort Levi surrendered 25 August 1760
Ile au Noix abandoned 28 August 1760
Montreal surrendered and with it all Canada and 10 French Battalions laid down their Arms 8 September 1760

St Johns Newfoundland retaken 18 September 1762
