= Filmer =

Filmer is both a surname and a given name. Notable people with the name include:

== Surname ==
- Caileigh Filmer (born 1996), Canadian rower
- Dennis Filmer (1916–1981), Malaysian Olympic sport shooter
- Edmund Filmer (disambiguation), several people
- Edward Filmer (c. 1654 – 1703), English dramatist
- Henry Filmer (died 1543), English Protestant martyr
- John Filmer (disambiguation), several people
- Mary Georgina Filmer (née Cecil; 1838–1903), British photographic collage artist
- Robert Filmer (disambiguation), several people
- Walter Drowley Filmer (1865–1944), an early pioneer of X-rays in Australia

== Given name ==
- Filmer Honywood (c. 1745–1809), English politician
- Filmer Hubble (1904–1969), Canadian organist, choir conductor, adjudicator, and music educator
- Filmer S. Northrop (1893–1992), American philosopher

== See also ==
- Filmer baronets
- Camera operator
- Videographer
