= Edmund Filmer =

Edmund Filmer may refer to:

- Sir Edmund Filmer, 8th Baronet (1809–1857), Member of Parliament (MP) for West Kent 1838–1857
- Sir Edmund Filmer, 9th Baronet (1835–1886), MP for West Kent 1859–1865 and Mid Kent 1880–1884
- Sir Edmund Filmer, 6th Baronet (1727–1834), of the Filmer baronets

== See also ==
- Edward Filmer, English dramatist
