= John Filmer =

John Filmer may refer to:

- Jack Filmer (John Francis Filmer, 1895–1979), Australian-born New Zealand scientist
- Sir John Filmer, 4th Baronet (1716–1797), MP for Steyning
- Sir John Filmer, 7th Baronet, of the Filmer baronets

== See also ==
- Filmer, surname
