= St Peter's and St Paul's Church, East Sutton =

Coordinates: 51.215906°N 0.615919°E

St Peter's and St Paul's church
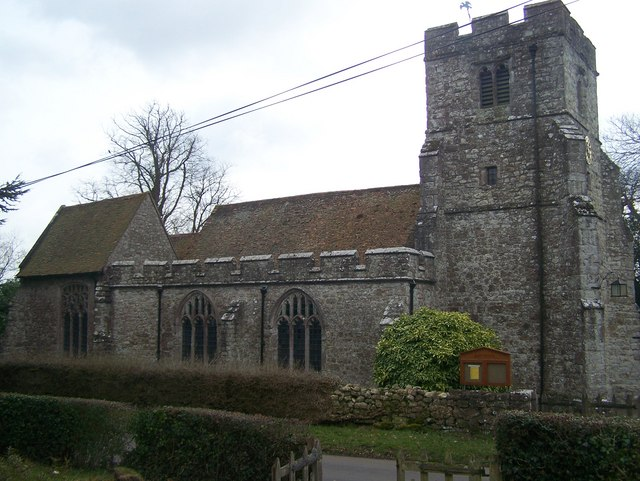
- North side of the church

- Location within Kent
- OS grid reference: TQ 82793 49552
- Location: East Sutton, Kent
- Country: England
- Denomination: Anglican
- Website: church website

History
- Status: Parish church

Architecture
- Functional status: Active
- Heritage designation: Grade I
- Designated: 26 April 1968
- Completed: Mid 13th century, 14th, 15th and 16th centuries

Administration
- Province: Canterbury
- Diocese: Canterbury
- Archdeaconry: Maidstone
- Deanery: The Weald

St Peter's and St Paul's Church is a parish church in Church Lane, East Sutton, Kent dedicated to saints Peter and Paul. It was begun in the mid-13th century or earlier and additions were made in the 14th, 15th and 16th centuries. Restoration work was carried out on the church in the late 19th and late 20th centuries. The church is a Grade I listed building.

== Building ==
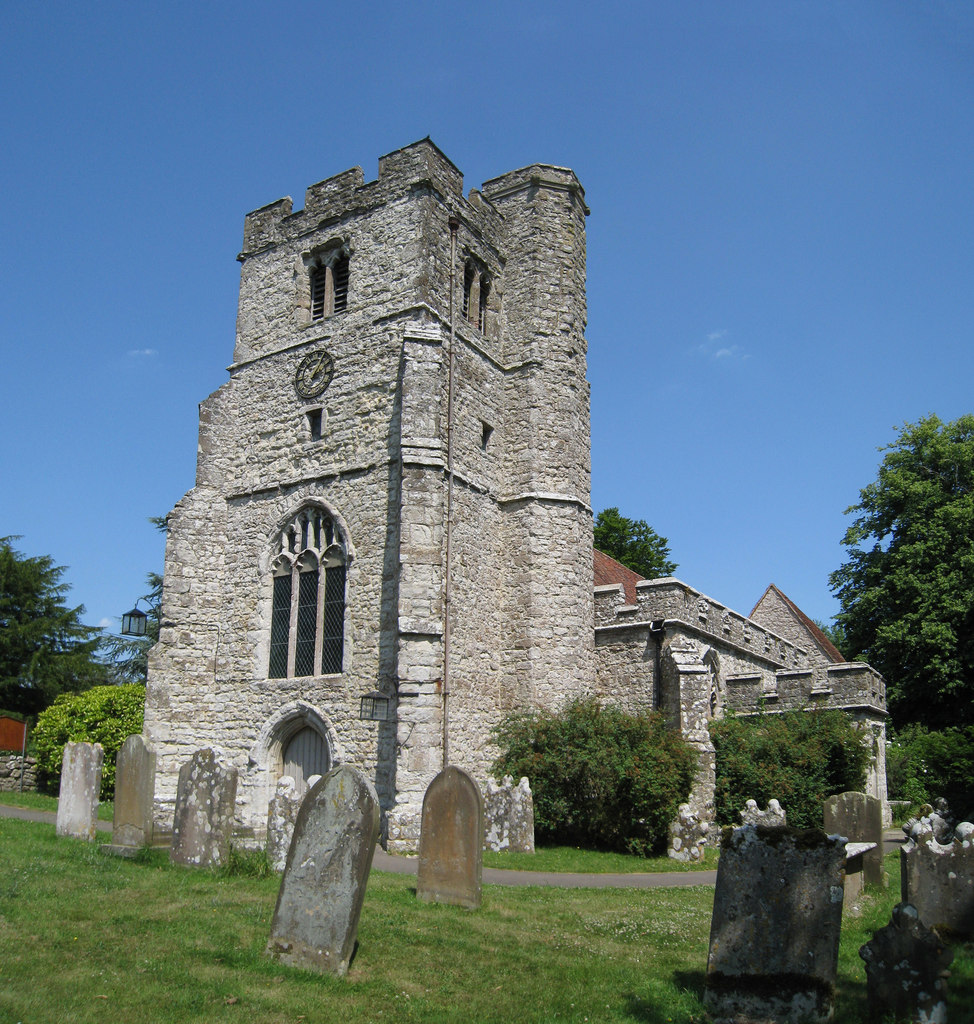
The west tower from the south-west with the stair turret, south aisle and south porch visible.

Construction of the church had begun by the mid 13th century and continued in phases over the next three centuries. Restorations were carried out in 1897–98 and 1984–95.

The church is constructed of roughly coursed stone and has a plain tiled roofs. The 13th-century west tower comprises three stages with buttresses on the north-east, north-west and south-west corners and a taller attached stair turret on the south-east corner. String courses separate each stage and a battlemented parapet forms the top of the walls on each side. The west side contains a three-lighted traceried window in the first stage positioned above the small west door. The second stage contains small rectangular windows on the three outward-facing façades and the third stage contains two-lighted belfry windows on each side.

The 14th century nave is flanked on each side by aisles added in the early 15th century. The external walls of both aisles are buttressed and have a moulded stone plinth and a string course topped by a battlemented parapet. The aisles are divided from the nave with arcades of four pointed arches with octagonal columns and moulded capitals and bases. The capitals differ on the two arcades. Each aisle contains two three-lighted arched windows. The aisles have shallow lean-to roofs, but evidence internally suggests that these were steeper before the 15th century. In the centre of the south aisle, the lower 15th-century porch contains single windows in the east and west sides and a battlemented parapet. The arched doorway contains quatrefoil decoration in the spandrels.

The chancel is flanked by chapels on each side, divided from them by arcades of two pointed arches, again with octagonal columns. The gabled east end contains a three-lighted window installed in 1897. Each chapel is buttressed and has a steeply pitched roof taller than the chancel. The north chapel has an intricately traceried three-lighted window on the north side containing quatrefoils and sexfoils and stars. Each chapel is connected to the corresponding aisle with a single arch probably from the early 15th century. The roofs of the nave and chancel feature octagonal crown post trusses; the three in the nave have moulded capitals and bosses. The 13th century hexagonal font stands on seven plain columns on a hexagonal base. The south wall of the sanctuary, the south wall of the south chapel and the east wall of the north chapel each contain a piscina. The carved wooden pulpit is hexagonal and early 17th-century. The church is a Grade I listed building.

== Monuments and memorials ==
The church contains a large number of memorials to members of the Filmer family former owners of the adjacent house of East Sutton Park. These include Robart Filmer (d. 1585), Sir Robert Filmer (d. 1720), Sir Edward Filmer (d. 1755), Beversham Filmer (d. 1763), Dorothea Filmer (d. 1793), Sir John Filmer (d. 1797) and Rev. Sir John Filmer (d. 1834) and wife. Other monuments include Richard Argal (d. 1605), Margaret Randolph (d. 1609).

== See also ==
- Grade I listed buildings in Maidstone
