= Robert Filmer (disambiguation) =

Robert Filmer (c. 1588–1653) was a political theorist.

Robert Filmer is also the name of:

- Sir Robert Filmer, 1st Baronet, of the Filmer baronets, father of Edward Filmer
- Sir Robert Filmer, 2nd Baronet (1648–1720), of the Filmer baronets
- Sir Robert Marcus Filmer, 10th Baronet (1878–1916), of the Filmer baronets
