= Camer Park =

Country park in Kent, England

Camer Country Park
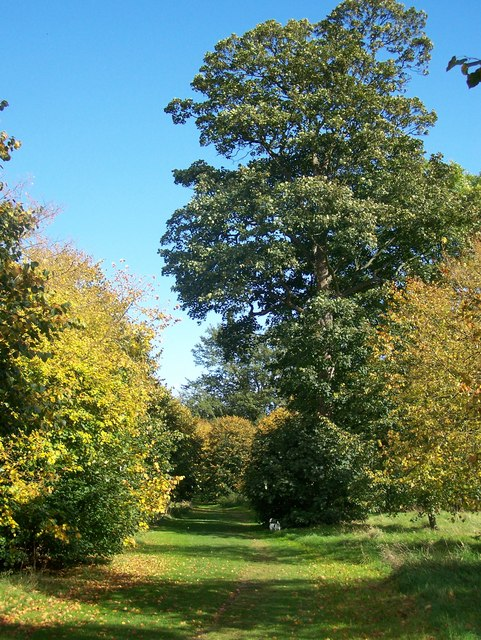
- Camer Country Park
- Interactive map of Camer Country Park
- Coordinates: 51°22′39″N 0°22′08″E (grid reference TQ649669)
- Area: 40 acres (160,000 m^{2})
- Created: 1971
- Operator: Kent County Council,
- Open: All-year, 7 days a week, dawn until dusk

Camer Park is a 40 acres (16 ha)-country park near Meopham, in Kent, England. A former country house estate with ancient landscaped parkland, grassland and woodland, Camer is situated in the Kent Downs National Landscape, an Area of Outstanding Natural Beauty.

Common lizards (Viviparous lizards) and slowworms can be found in the park.

== History ==
There had been a farmstead at Camer since the 13th century. It was owned since Elizabethan times by seven generations of the Masters family. Upon the death without issue of William Masters (1732–1761), the estate passed to his sister, Kate Masters (1727–1814), who in 1748 had married a cousin of the Smith baronets, William Smith (1720–1764).

Their grandson, William Masters Smith (1802–1861), was elected Member of Parliament for West Kent and served as High Sheriff of Kent (1849-50). Under his ownership, Camer Park reached its peak size. His great-nephew, William Smith-Masters, who played cricket for Kent CCC, inherited the family estate in 1875, and upon his death in 1937, Camer passed to his younger brother, the Revd John Smith-Masters FRHistS (1856–1940), then his elder surviving son, Captain Ernest Smith-Masters (1889–1963) late Royal Engineers. His only son, Colonel George Smith-Masters (1916–1988) late Royal Army Service Corps, inherited Camer and in 1967 sold the parkland to the Strood Rural District Council for the £9,750. Colonel Smith-Masters retained the manorial lordships, and ownership of Camer House, a Grade II-listed mansion built in 1716, which can be seen from the park.

The park was opened to the public as a Country Park in the early 1970s by Gravesham Borough Council, and is now managed by Kent County Council.
