= William Masters Smith =

British politician

Member of Parliament for West Kent
- In office 1852–1857

Personal details
- Born: 20 March 1802
- Died: 24 December 1861 (aged 59) Camer Park, Kent
- Party: Conservative
- Spouse: Frances Elphinstone (m. 1836)
- Relatives: Sir Howard Elphinstone (father-in-law); William Smith-Masters (great-nephew)

William Masters Smith (20 March 1802 – 24 December 1861), was a 19th-century English landowner and Conservative politician, who represented West Kent as member of parliament (MP) from 1852 to 1857.

== Life ==
The only son of George Smith (1757–1831) and Rebecca née Brett (died 1843), he was seated at Camer, near Meopham, and lord of the manors of Luddesdowne and Dodmore. Appointed a justice of the peace and deputy lieutenant, Masters Smith served as High Sheriff of Kent for 1849/50.

On 6 September 1836, he married Frances Elphinstone (died 1905), eldest daughter of Major-General Sir Howard Elphinstone, and died without issue in 1861.

He was succeeded in the family estates by his nephew, who assumed the name and arms of Smith-Masters by Royal Licence in 1862.

== See also ==
- Camer Park
- High Sheriff of Kent

Parliament of the United Kingdom
Preceded by Thomas Law Hodges; Sir Edmund Filmer, Bt	Member of Parliament for West Kent; 1852 – 1857; With: Sir Edmund Filmer, Bt (to February 1857); Charles Wykeham Martin (from February 1857)	Succeeded by Charles Wykeham Martin; James Whatman
