= Sir William Geary, 3rd Baronet =

English Conservative Party politician

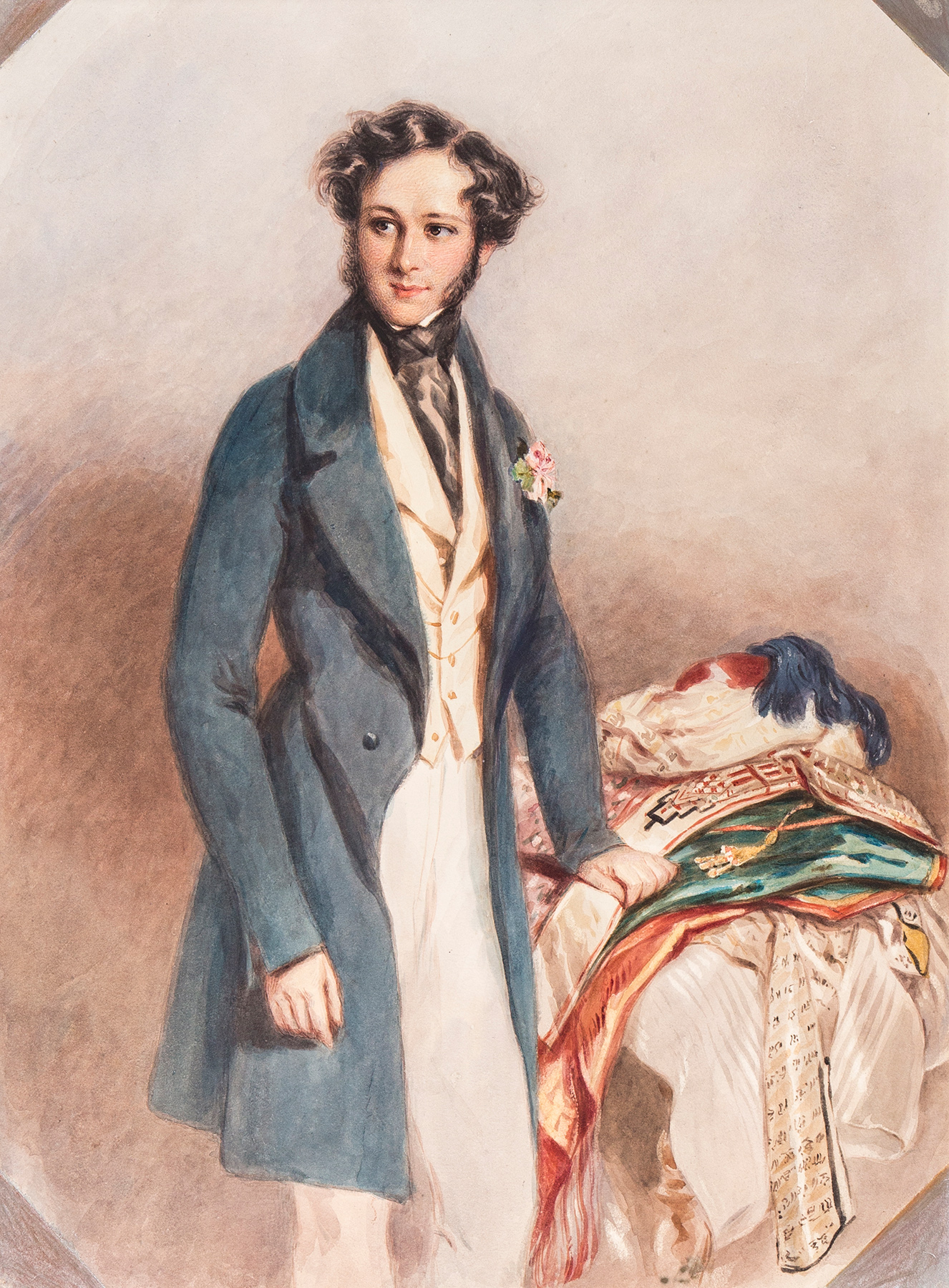
'Sir William Geary 3rd Bt.', watercolour, by Alfred Edward Chalon

Sir William Richard Powlett Geary, 3rd Baronet (13 November 1810 – 19 December 1877) was an English Conservative Party politician. He sat in the House of Commons from 1835 to 1838.

He was the eldest son of Sir William Geary, 2nd Baronet, whom he succeeded in 1825.

Geary contested the 1832 general election in the newly created Western division of Kent, without success, but won the seat at the 1835 general election. He was re-elected in 1837, and held the seat until his resignation in 1838 by taking the Chiltern Hundreds.

On his death he was buried in St Peter and St Paul Church, Tonbridge. He had married Louisa Charlotte Bruce. They had one daughter who remained unmarried. On his death without male issue, the baronetcy passed to his brother Francis.

Parliament of the United Kingdom
Preceded by Thomas Rider; Thomas Law Hodges	Member of Parliament for West Kent; 1835 – 1838; With: Thomas Law Hodges	Succeeded by Sir Edmund Filmer, Bt; Thomas Law Hodges
Baronetage of Great Britain
Preceded by William Geary	Baronet (of Oxenheath); 1825–1877	Succeeded by Francis Geary
