= James Whatman (politician) =

English politician

James Whatman (1813 – 12 March 1887) was an English Liberal politician who sat in the House of Commons in two periods between 1852 and 1874.

Whatman was the son of James Whatman of Vinter's, near Maidstone and his wife Eliza Susanna Gaussen, daughter of Samuel Richard Gaussen of Brookman's Park, Hertfordshire. He was educated at Eton College and at Christ Church, Oxford graduating with BA 4th class in classics in 1834 and MA in 1838. He became a Fellow of the Royal Society on 9 January 1840 and was also a Fellow of the Society of Antiquaries. Whatman was a director of the South Eastern Railway. He was a captain in the West Kent Militia and was a Deputy Lieutenant of London and a Deputy Lieutenant and J.P. for Kent.

Whatman was elected at 1852 general election as one of the two Members of Parliament (MP) for the Maidstone, but at the 1857 general election he did not stand again in Maidstone, and instead won one of the two seats for the Western division of Kent. He was defeated in that constituency at the 1859 general election.

After a six-year absence, Whatman was returned to the House of Commons at the 1865 election for the borough of Maidstone, and held that seat until he stood down at the 1874 general election.

Whatman married Louisa Isabella Ross, daughter of Charles and Lady Mary Ross in 1850.

== Sources ==
- Craig, F. W. S. (1989) [First published 1977]. British parliamentary election results 1832–1885 (2nd ed.). Chichester: Parliamentary Research Services. pp. 199–200. ISBN 0-900178-26-4.

Parliament of the United Kingdom
Preceded by Alexander Hope; George Dodd	Member of Parliament for Maidstone; 1852 – 1857; With: George Dodd to 1853; William Lee from 1853	Succeeded by Alexander Hope; Edward Scott
Preceded by William Masters Smith; Charles Wykeham Martin	Member of Parliament for West Kent; 1857 – 1859; With: Charles Wykeham Martin	Succeeded by Viscount Holmesdale; Sir Edmund Filmer, Bt
Preceded by Charles Buxton; William Lee	Member of Parliament for Maidstone; 1865 – 1874; With: William Lee to 1870; Sir John Lubbock, Bt from 1870	Succeeded by Sir Sydney Waterlow, Bt; Sir John Lubbock, Bt
