= William Lee (1801–1881) =

English cement merchant and politician in 19th century

William Lee (23 August 1801 – 29 September 1881) was an English cement merchant and Whig and later Liberal politician who sat in the House of Commons in two periods between 1853 and 1870.

Lee was the son of Henry Lee of Camp's Hill, Lewisham. He was a partner of the firm of Lee, Son and Co., lime and cement merchants of London and Rochester, Kent. He was director of the Millwall Freehold Land and Docks Co., the Metropolitan Railway, and the Victoria Station & Pimlico Railway. He was a Deputy Lieutenant and J.P. for Kent.

In 1852, Lee stood unsuccessfully for parliament at Maidstone. He was elected Member of Parliament for Maidstone in a by-election in 1853 but lost the seat in 1857. He was re-elected for Maidstone in 1859 and held the seat until 1870.

== Cement Manufacture ==
William Lee was a pioneer of the Medway cement industry. He took up residence at Holborough House, Snodland in 1843 and set up a large limeworks at Halling in 1846. In about 1854 he commenced making Portland cement. This cement plant became one of the largest on the River Medway. He led the campaign to establish the Medway Conservancy Board to facilitate the barge transportation of cement. His descendants built Holborough Court and continued the development of the cement industry in the area.

Lee died at the age of 80.

Lee married Christiana Reynolds, daughter of Samuel Reynolds of Theydon, Essex in 1820.

Parliament of the United Kingdom
Preceded by George Dodd; James Whatman	Member of Parliament for Maidstone; 1853 – 1857; With: James Whatman	Succeeded by Alexander Beresford Hope; Edward Scott
Preceded by Alexander Beresford Hope; Edward Scott	Member of Parliament for Maidstone; 1859 – 1870; With: Charles Buxton; James Whatman	Succeeded by James Whatman; Sir John Lubbock
