= George Dodd (politician) =

English Conservative politician

George Dodd (c. 1800 – 12 December 1864) was an English Conservative politician who sat in the House of Commons from 1841 to 1853.

Dodd was the son of George Dodd of Montagu Square, London. He was elected Fellow of the Society of Antiquaries on 12 March 1835.

Dodd was elected Member of Parliament (MP) for Maidstone, Kent on 29 June 1841 and held the seat until 1853. He was re-elected for Maidstone in the 1852 general election but his election was declared void on petition, and a by-election was held on 22 April 1853. He was one of the Gentlemen of Her Majesty's privy chamber from 1844.

Dodd married Georgiana Sanders, daughter of Joseph Sanders. They had one son, George Ashley Dodd, born 29 Sept 1842. Their granddaughter Editha Aceituna Thurlow Griffin was a mystery and historical romance writer.

In 1865 Thomas Allom was commissioned to design a mausoleum for George Dodd at West Norwood Cemetery. The mausoleum is in the form of a small Gothic chapel with coloured marble, suggesting a north Italian inspiration for the design, and is now a Grade II listed building. It has been suggested that Dodd had bought sixteen houses designed by Thomas Allom in Kensington Park Gardens and wanted his mausoleum to be designed by the same architect.

Parliament of the United Kingdom
Preceded by John Minet Fector; Alexander Beresford Hope	MP for Maidstone; 1841–1853; With: Alexander Beresford Hope 1841–1852; James Whatman 1852–1853	Succeeded by James Whatman; William Lee
