= Thomas Austen =

British soldier and politician

Thomas Austen (1775 – 23 July 1859) was a British soldier and politician.

He was the second cousin of Jane Austen, the novelist, and lived at Kippington Park, Sevenoaks. He was educated at St John's College, Cambridge.

As a soldier he fought in America with the 40th Foot regiment. He was made Aide Principale to the Viceroy of Ireland, leaving the army with the rank of colonel.

In 1823, he was appointed Sheriff of Kent and was member of parliament (MP) for West Kent from 1845 to 1847.

He was an avid cricketer and played in the Duke of Dorset's team known as the "Gentlemen of Kent"

He married twice: firstly the rich heiress Margaretta Morland and secondly in 1826 the young Caroline Catherine Manning, daughter of William Manning. He had no children and his heir was a nephew, John Francis Austen.

Parliament of the United Kingdom
Preceded by Viscount Marsham; Sir Edmund Filmer, Bt	Member of Parliament for West Kent; 1845–1847; With: Sir Edmund Filmer, Bt	Succeeded by Thomas Law Hodges; Sir Edmund Filmer, Bt
