= Sir John Filmer, 4th Baronet =

English aristocrat and parliamentarian (1716-1797)

Sir John Filmer, 4th Baronet (1716–1797), of East Sutton, Kent was a Member of Parliament for Steyning in 1767–1774.

== Arms ==
Coat of arms of Sir John Filmer, 4th Baronet
Crest A falcon volant Proper beaked and legged Or standing on a ruined castle of the last. Escutcheon Barry of six Or and Sable on a chief of the last three cinquefoils of the first.

Baronetage of England
Preceded by Edward Filmer	Baronet (of East Sutton); 1755–1797	Succeeded by Beversham Filmer
