= Listed buildings in East Sutton =

Historic structures in Kent, England

East Sutton is a village and civil parish in the Borough of Maidstone of Kent, England It contains one grade I, five grade II* and 29 grade II listed buildings that are recorded in the National Heritage List for England.

This list is based on the information retrieved online from Historic England.

== Key ==
Grade	Criteria
I	Buildings that are of exceptional interest
II*	Particularly important buildings of more than special interest
II	Buildings that are of special interest

== Listing ==
Name	Grade	Location	Type	Completed (Note: The date given is the date used by Historic England as significant for the initial building or that of an important part in the structure's description.)	Date designated	Grid ref. (Note: The grid reference is based on the British national grid reference system, sometimes known as OSGB36, used by the Ordnance Survey.) Geo-coordinates	Notes	Entry number (Note: The "List Entry Number" is a unique number assigned to each listed building and scheduled monument by Historic England.)	Image	Wikidata
Church of St Peter and St Paul	I				26 April 1968	TQ8279349552; 51°12′57″N 0°36′57″E		1060920	Church of St Peter and St Paul More images	Q7595340
Deerhouse About 8 Metres South of Stock Yard at East Sutton Park	II				18 December 1985	TQ8293049461; 51°12′54″N 0°37′04″E		1356551	Upload Photo	Q26639196
East Half of Stock Yard at East Sutton Park	II				18 December 1985	TQ8292049491; 51°12′55″N 0°37′04″E		1068568	Upload Photo	Q26321273
East Sutton Park	II				18 December 1985	TQ8279349475; 51°12′55″N 0°36′57″E		1084345	Upload Photo	Q99937409
Former Riding School and Prospect Tower at East Sutton Park	II				18 December 1985	TQ8283649445; 51°12′54″N 0°36′59″E		1084352	Upload Photo	Q26367997
Garden Wall About 1 1/2 Metres North of Wall About 4 1/2 Metres North of Stock Yard at East Sutton Park	II				18 December 1985	TQ8286049567; 51°12′58″N 0°37′01″E		1356214	Upload Photo	Q26638899
Garden Wall About 4 1/2 Metres North of Stock Yard at East Sutton Park	II				18 December 1985	TQ8290749511; 51°12′56″N 0°37′03″E		1344268	Upload Photo	Q26628005
Lodge at Tq 825 494	II				18 December 1985	TQ8252949370; 51°12′52″N 0°36′43″E		1060923	Upload Photo	Q26314071
Outbuilding About 7 Metres South of East Sutton Park	II				18 December 1985	TQ8280449436; 51°12′53″N 0°36′58″E		1344306	Upload Photo	Q26628041
Pig Styes and Gatepier About 4 Metres East of Item 5/60 at East Sutton Park	II				18 December 1985	TQ8295449512; 51°12′56″N 0°37′06″E		1060922	Upload Photo	Q26314070
West Half of Stock Yard at East Sutton Park	II				18 December 1985	TQ8288349473; 51°12′55″N 0°37′02″E		1060921	Upload Photo	Q26314069
Church Farm Cottages	II	Chartway Street			18 December 1985	TQ8266950105; 51°13′15″N 0°36′52″E		1068624	Upload Photo	Q26321325
Street Farmhouse	II	Chartway Street			18 December 1985	TQ8336250264; 51°13′20″N 0°37′28″E		1060924	Upload Photo	Q26314072
The Blue House	II*	Chartway Street			26 April 1968	TQ8317850251; 51°13′19″N 0°37′18″E		1344269	Upload Photo	Q17545380
Charlton Court	II	East Sutton Hill, ME17 3DG			4 November 1981	TQ8343449249; 51°12′47″N 0°37′30″E		1060925	Upload Photo	Q26314073
Barling Farmhouse	II	East Sutton Road			26 April 1968	TQ8316448023; 51°12′07″N 0°37′14″E		1068675	Upload Photo	Q26321373
Barns About 4 Metres South of Parsonage Farmhouse	II	East Sutton Road			18 December 1985	TQ8333049279; 51°12′48″N 0°37′24″E		1344271	Upload Photo	Q26628007
Brissenden House	II	East Sutton Road			26 April 1968	TQ8317047714; 51°11′57″N 0°37′13″E		1060926	Upload Photo	Q26314074
Divers Farmhouse	II	East Sutton Road			26 April 1968	TQ8348048630; 51°12′27″N 0°37′31″E		1344270	Upload Photo	Q26628006
Luckhurst	II*	East Sutton Road			26 April 1968	TQ8327947936; 51°12′04″N 0°37′19″E		1068646	Upload Photo	Q17545081
Noahs Ark Farmhouse	II*	East Sutton Road			18 December 1985	TQ8246746694; 51°11′25″N 0°36′35″E		1356139	Upload Photo	Q17545430
Oasthouse at Tq 832 495	II	East Sutton Road			18 December 1985	TQ8329249453; 51°12′53″N 0°37′23″E		1068632	Upload Photo	Q26321333
Outbuildings (formerly Stables) About 33 Metres North of Redhill School	II	East Sutton Road			18 December 1985	TQ8339949324; 51°12′49″N 0°37′28″E		1356197	Upload Photo	Q26638885
Parsonage Farmhouse	II*	East Sutton Road			26 April 1968	TQ8331349287; 51°12′48″N 0°37′24″E		1356171	Parsonage Farmhouse More images	Q17545434
Friday Street Farmhouse	II	Friday Street			18 December 1985	TQ8259549250; 51°12′48″N 0°36′47″E		1068695	Upload Photo	Q26321392
Hecton Farmhouse	II	Friday Street			18 December 1985	TQ8290948658; 51°12′28″N 0°37′02″E		1060928	Upload Photo	Q26314076
Barn About 16 Metres South West of Little Moatenden	II	Headcorn Road			18 December 1985	TQ8196346634; 51°11′24″N 0°36′09″E		1356147	Upload Photo	Q26638840
Little Moatenden	II	Headcorn Road			18 December 1985	TQ8199546655; 51°11′24″N 0°36′11″E		1344272	Upload Photo	Q26628008
Bell's Farmhouse	II	Heniker Lane			18 December 1985	TQ8271147593; 51°11′54″N 0°36′49″E		1344273	Upload Photo	Q26628009
Boyton Court	II	Heniker Lane			18 December 1985	TQ8218948849; 51°12′35″N 0°36′25″E		1060929	Upload Photo	Q26314077
Barn Near Morry House	II	Morry Lane			24 July 1989	TQ8374749753; 51°13′03″N 0°37′47″E		1060855	Upload Photo	Q26314012
Elm Cottage	II	Morry Lane			18 December 1985	TQ8349648586; 51°12′25″N 0°37′32″E		1068733	Upload Photo	Q26321428
Morry House	II	Morry Lane			18 December 1985	TQ8378549709; 51°13′01″N 0°37′49″E		1068711	Upload Photo	Q26321407
Walnut Tree Cottage	II*	Morry Lane			18 December 1985	TQ8375149379; 51°12′51″N 0°37′46″E		1060930	Upload Photo	Q17545034
Wirksworth Workhouse Cottages	II	Workhouse Lane			18 December 1985	TQ8245450055; 51°13′14″N 0°36′41″E		1344274	Upload Photo	Q26628010

== See also ==
- Grade I listed buildings in Kent
- Grade II* listed buildings in Kent

== Sources ==
- Newman, John (2012) [1969], Kent: West and the Weald, The Buildings of England, New Haven and London: Yale University Press, ISBN 978-0-300-18509-6
