= Alexander Beresford Hope =

British author and politician (1820–1887)

The Right Honourable Sir Alexander Beresford Hope PC
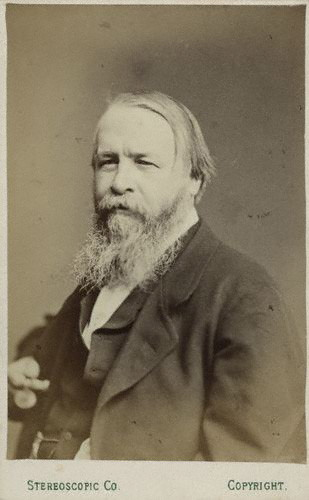
- Hope, c. 1870s

Member of the British Parliament for Maidstone
- In office 1841–1852

Personal details
- Born: 25 January 1820 London, England
- Died: 20 October 1887 (aged 67) Kilndown, Kent, England
- Party: Conservative
- Spouse: Lady Mildred Beresford Hope (m. 1842; died 1881)
- Children: 10
- Parent: Thomas Hope (father)
- Relatives: Henry Thomas Hope (brother); Henry Philip Hope (uncle); John Beresford, 2nd Baron Decies (uncle); Marcus Beresford (uncle); Alban Gibbs, 2nd Baron Aldenham (son-in-law); William Beresford, 1st Viscount Beresford (step-father and cousin); William Beresford, 1st Baron Decies (grandfather); Jan Hope (grandfather)
- Education: Trinity College, Cambridge
- Occupation: Author

Sir Alexander James Beresford Beresford Hope PC (né Hope; 25 January 1820 – 20 October 1887) was a British Conservative politician and author.

== Biography ==
=== Early life ===
Beresford Hope was born on 25 January 1820 to a Dutch father of Scottish descent and an Anglo-Irish mother. His father, Thomas Hope, was an art collector and his mother, Louisa de la Poer Hope (née Beresford, later Viscountess Beresford), was a society hostess.

A member of the Hope family of merchant bankers, he was the paternal grandson of the banker Jan Hope and the nephew of the art and gem collector Henry Philip Hope. Hope was also the maternal grandson of the Church of Ireland clergyman William Beresford, 1st Baron Decies , and the nephew of the clergyman John Beresford, 2nd Baron Decies and the soldier and politician Marcus Beresford. One of at least five siblings, he was the younger brother of the politician and patron of the arts Henry Thomas Hope.

Beresford Hope was educated at Harrow and Trinity College, Cambridge. His father died in 1831 and his mother married as her second husband her first cousin General William Beresford, 1st Viscount Beresford. In 1854 he inherited his stepfather's estates, including Bedgebury Park, Kent, and Beresford Hall, Staffordshire, and assumed by Royal licence the additional surname of Beresford.

=== Parliamentary career ===
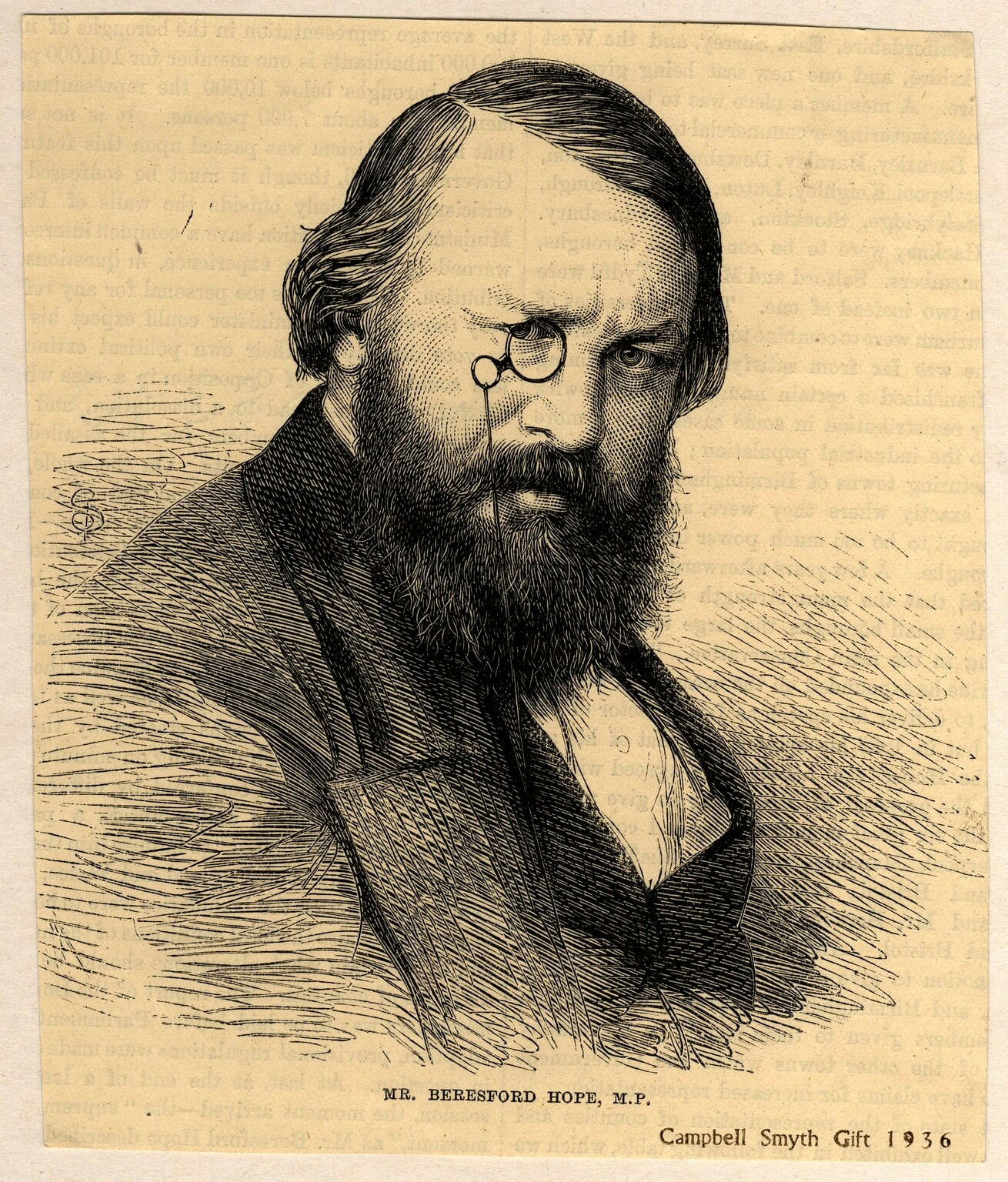
Wood-engraving (after an intermediary drawing by Thomas Dewell Scott), after photograph by Henry Hering, 1856

He sat as Member of Parliament for Maidstone from 1841 to 1852 and from 1857 to 1859. He unsuccessfully contested Cambridge University in 1859 and Stoke-upon-Trent in 1862, but was successfully returned for the latter constituency in 1865. From 1868 until his death he was one of two representatives for Cambridge University. From 1865 he sat as an independent Conservative. He vehemently opposed the Reform Act 1867 proposed by Benjamin Disraeli, nicknaming Disraeli "the Asian mystery" (referring to Disraeli's Jewish origins). Disraeli retorted by alluding to Beresford Hope's "Batavian graces" (in reference to his family's Dutch origins). He never held ministerial office but was sworn of the Privy Council in 1880.

=== Philanthropy and writing ===
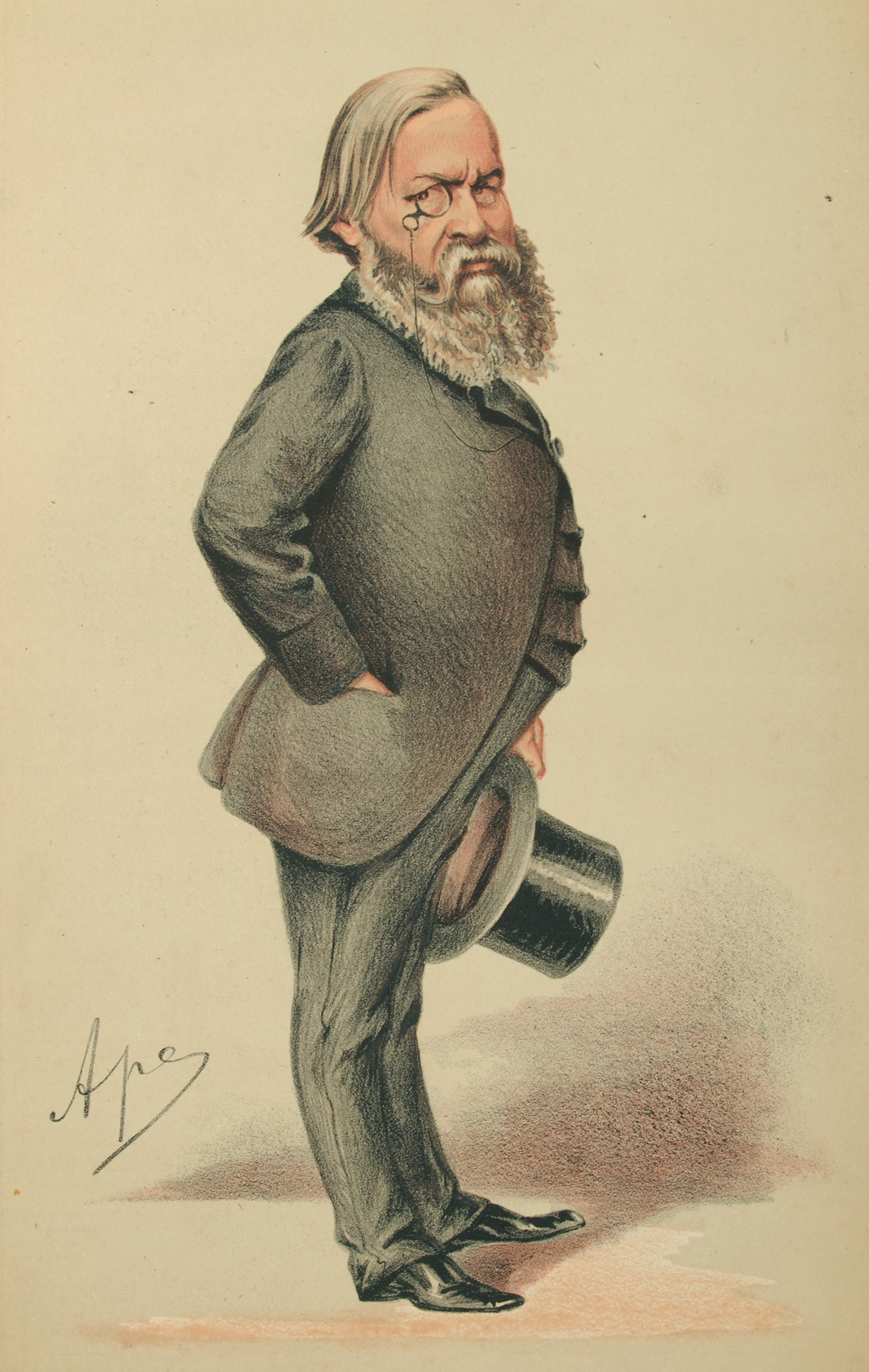
Caricature of Alexander Beresford-Hope from Vanity Fair, 1870

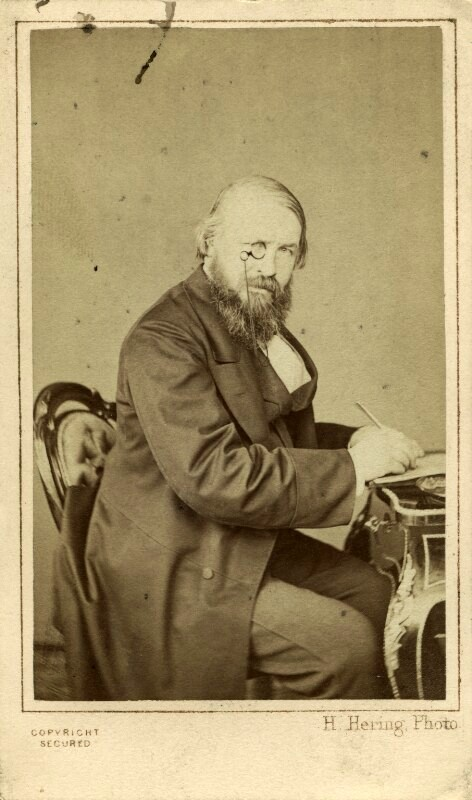
Henry Hering photo

Beresford Hope's most prominent public feature was his ardent support for the Church of England. According to George Wakeling, "in Parliament his voice, in his slow, rather harsh, but very impressive way, would be raised on every Church question". He was especially steadfast in his opposition to the Deceased Wife's Sister Bill.

While at Trinity College in 1839, he was, along with John Mason Neale and Benjamin Webb a founder of the Cambridge Camden Society (later the Ecclesiological Society). He re-established it in 1879 as the St Paul's Ecclesiological Society A very wealthy man, he purchased St Augustine's Abbey in Canterbury in 1844, to rebuild it as a college for missionary clergy. He also supervised the commissioning and construction of the church of All Saints, Margaret Street, London, to the designs of William Butterfield on behalf of the Ecclesiological Society.

In about 1850 Beresford Hope inherited the Beresford estate in Alstonefield and Sheen in Staffordshire. He wanted to make Sheen "the Athens of the Moorlands". He rebuilt the church, to the design of William Butterfield, and built a school and a lending library. It was remarked in The Ecclesiologist that "the general effect is that of an ecclesiastical colony in the wilds of Australia". Not all Hope's plans for Sheen were realized.

Beresford Hope was also a writer on archaeological, architectural, ecclesiastical and artistic subjects and was President of the Royal Institute of British Architects from 1865 to 1867 and a trustee of the British Museum. He co-founded the Saturday Review in 1855. He was elected a Fellow of the Royal Society in 1880. In 1873 he was invited to lay the foundation stone of the new Christ Church in St Leonards-on-Sea, East Sussex.

Beresford Hope was active in the funding Canon Nathaniel Woodard's national network of Woodard Schools.

=== Family ===
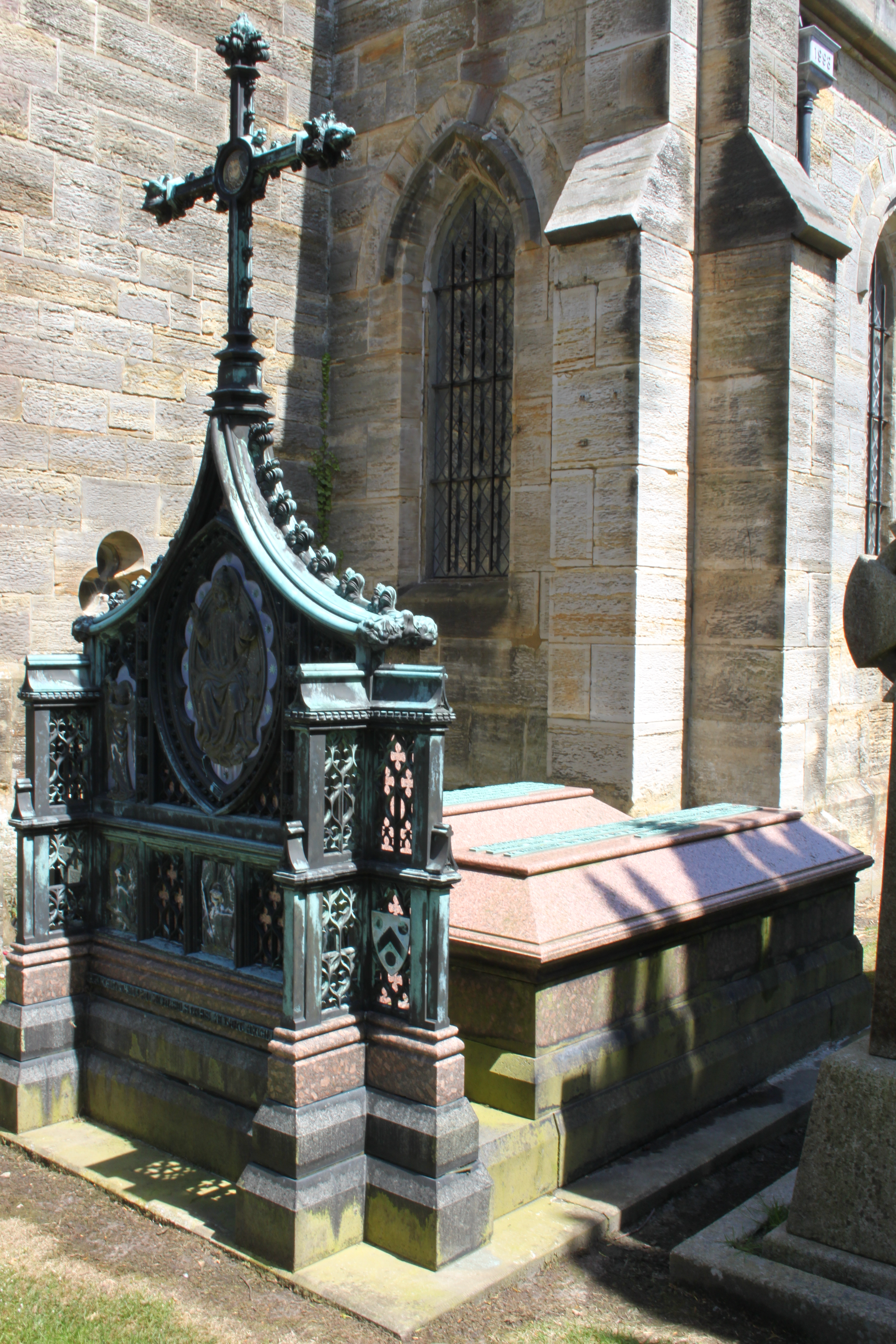
His grave at Christ Church, Kilndown

Beresford Hope married Lady Mildred Arabella Charlotte Henrietta Beresford Hope (née Gascoyne-Cecil), daughter of James Gascoyne-Cecil, 2nd Marquess of Salisbury, and sister of Robert Gascoyne-Cecil, 3rd Marquess of Salisbury, in 1842. They had three sons and seven daughters. Lady Mildred was a leading figure in London society for many years. She died in March 1881. Beresford Hope survived her by six years and died in October 1887, aged 67, at his home, Bedgebury Park, Goudhurst, Kent. He was buried at Christ Church, Kilndown, Kent. His daughter, Bridget, married Alban Gibbs, 2nd Baron Aldenham.

== Works ==
- Essays (1844)
- English cathedrals in the XIX. century (1861)
- The social and political bearings of the American disruption (1863)
- Cathedrals in their missionary aspects (1872)
- Hints towards peace in ceremonial matters (1874)
- Worship in the church of England (1874)
- Strictly tied-up (1880)
- The Brandreth (1882)
- Worship and order (1883)

== Notes ==
Parliament of the United Kingdom
Preceded by Benjamin Disraeli and John Minet Fector	Member of Parliament for Maidstone; 1841–1852; With: George Dodd	Succeeded by George Dodd and James Whatman
Preceded by James Whatman and William Lee	Member of Parliament for Maidstone; 1857–1859; With: Edward Scott	Succeeded by William Lee and Charles Buxton
Preceded by William Taylor Copeland and Henry Riversdale Grenfell	Member of Parliament for Stoke-upon-Trent; 1865–1868; With: Henry Riversdale Grenfell	Succeeded by Henry Riversdale Grenfell and George Melly
Preceded by Spencer Horatio Walpole and Charles Jasper Selwyn	Member of Parliament for Cambridge University; 1868–1887; With: Spencer Horatio Walpole 1868–1882; Henry Cecil Raikes 1882–1887	Succeeded by Henry Cecil Raikes and Sir George Stokes
