= Shepway, Maidstone =

Coordinates: 51.253°N 0.544°E

Shepway
- Location within Kent
- Population: 14,100 (2005)
- District: Maidstone
- Shire county: Kent
- Region: South East
- Country: England
- Sovereign state: United Kingdom
- Post town: MAIDSTONE
- Postcode district: ME15
- Dialling code: 01622
- Police: Kent
- Fire: Kent
- Ambulance: South East Coast
- UK Parliament: Faversham and Mid Kent

Shepway is a suburb to the south-east of Maidstone in Kent, England. It lies to the south of Mote Park, to the east of Loose Road (A229) and Sutton Road (A274), and west of Willington Street. The area was formerly farmland and orchards. The suburb takes its name from Shepway Court, a country house which stood where the road of that name is today.

== History ==
Construction of the suburb started in the 1930s with the building of South Park Road, the western ends of Plains Avenue, Marion Crescent and Cranborne Avenue (originally named Shepway Avenue) and parts of Brockenhurst, Ringwood and Lyndhurst Roads. The majority of the suburb was constructed as a council estate by Maidstone Borough Council in stages after World War II. Phases of infill construction continued up to the present. The original grid of roads laid out for the council estate after World War II bear names of traditional English counties (for example Northumberland Road, Cambridge Crescent, Hampshire Drive, Rutland Way and Nottingham Avenue). The estate was originally planned with large areas of open land for recreation, although later building has encroached on some of this space.

== Transport ==
Bus 85 runs between Shepway and central Maidstone.

== Notable residents ==
During the 1950s and 1960s the lead partner at the estate's medical centre was Dr Alan Barnsley, better known as the award-winning novelist and poet Gabriel Fielding.
