= William Hart Dyke =

English politician and tennis pioneer

The Right Honourable Sir William Hart Dyke Bt DL JP
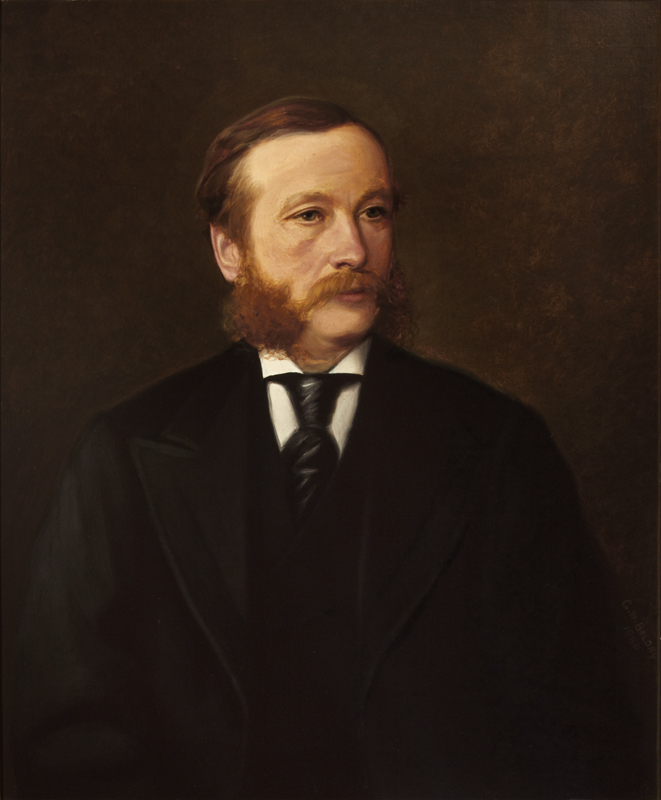

Chief Secretary for Ireland
- In office 25 June 1885 – 23 January 1886
- Monarch: Victoria
- Prime Minister: The Marquess of Salisbury
- Preceded by: Henry Campbell-Bannerman
- Succeeded by: William Henry Smith

Personal details
- Born: 7 August 1837
- Died: 3 July 1931 (aged 93)
- Party: Conservative
- Spouse(s): Lady Emily Montague (d. 1931)
- Education: Christ Church, Oxford

Sir William Hart Dyke, 7th Baronet PC, DL, JP (7 August 1837 – 3 July 1931) was an English Conservative politician and tennis pioneer.

== Background and education ==
The second son of Sir Percival Hart Dyke, 6th Baronet and Elizabeth Wells, Hart Dyke was educated at Windlesham House School, Harrow School and Christ Church, Oxford. He graduated M.A. in 1864. He was described as "one of the best amateur rackets players of his day". In 1862, won the Rackets World Championships from a professional player (Francis Erwood) at the Prince's Club, which was the former headquarters of rackets. In 1873 he played lawn tennis in a significant early match with John Moyer Heathcote and Julian Marshall at his home of Lullingstone Castle. In 1875 with Heathcote he was a member of the Marylebone Cricket Club committee that framed the original set of rules for tennis.

== Political career ==
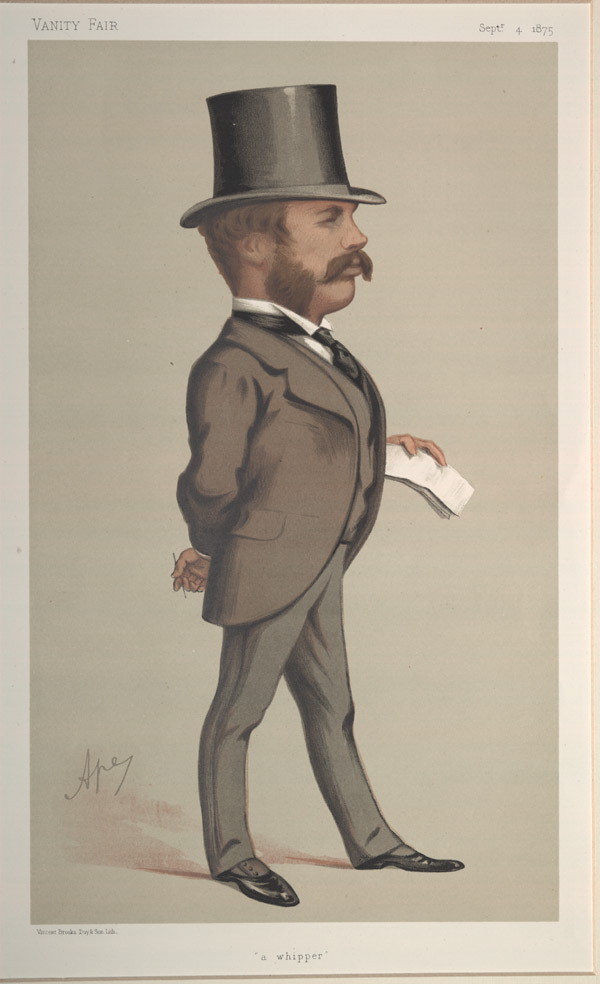
"A whipper". Caricature by Ape published in Vanity Fair in 1875.

Hart Dyke was Conservative Member of Parliament for West Kent between 1865 and 1868, for Mid Kent between 1868 and 1885 and for Dartford between 1885 and 1906. He was a Conservative whip from 1868 to 1874, and held ministerial office under Benjamin Disraeli as Parliamentary Secretary to the Treasury from 1874 to 1880 and under Lord Salisbury as Chief Secretary for Ireland from 1885 to 1886 and as Vice-President of the Committee of the Council on Education from 1887 to 1892. He succeeded his father to the baronetcy in 1875, and was appointed a Privy Counsellor in 1880.

== Family ==
Hart Dyke married Lady Emily Caroline Montague, daughter of the 7th Earl of Sandwich, in 1870. He died in July 1931, aged 93, and was succeeded in the baronetcy by his fourth and only surviving son, Oliver. Oliver was married to Zoe Dyke who farmed silk worms. The elder Lady Hart Dyke survived her husband by only a month and died in August 1931.

Parliament of the United Kingdom
Preceded by Viscount Holmesdale; Sir Edmund Filmer, Bt	Member of Parliament for West Kent; 1865 – 1868; With: Viscount Holmesdale	Succeeded by Sir Charles Mills; John Gilbert Talbot
New constituency	Member of Parliament for Mid Kent; 1868 – 1885; With: Viscount Holmesdale 1868–1880; Sir Edmund Filmer, Bt 1880–1884; John Stewart Gathorne-Hardy 1884–1885	Constituency abolished
New constituency	Member of Parliament for Dartford; 1885 – 1906	Succeeded by James Rowlands
Political offices
Preceded by Arthur Wellesley Peel	Parliamentary Secretary to the Treasury; 1874–1880	Succeeded by Lord Richard Grosvenor
Preceded by Henry Campbell-Bannerman	Chief Secretary for Ireland; 1885–1886	Succeeded by William Henry Smith
Preceded by Henry Holland	Vice-President of the Committee of the Council on Education; 1887–1892	Succeeded by Arthur Herbert Dyke Acland
Baronetage of England
Preceded by Percival Hart Dyke	Baronet (of Horeham); 1875–1931	Succeeded by Oliver Hart Dyke
