= Andrew Rowe =

British politician

Member of Parliament for Faversham and Mid Kent Mid Kent (1983–1997)
- In office 9 June 1983 – 14 May 2001
- Preceded by: Constituency established
- Succeeded by: Hugh Robertson

Personal details
- Born: Andrew John Bernard Rowe; 11 September 1935
- Died: 21 November 2008 (aged 73)
- Party: Conservative
- Children: Nicholas Rowe
- Education: Merton College, Oxford

Andrew John Bernard Rowe (11 September 1935 – 21 November 2008) was a politician in the United Kingdom. He was born in London. He served as Conservative Party member of parliament for Mid Kent from 1983 to 1997 and its successor constituency Faversham and Mid Kent from 1997 until he stepped down in 2001. He was replaced by Hugh Robertson.

He was educated at Eton College and Merton College, Oxford (MA). He was the father of actor Nicholas Rowe. He was also the founding Father of the UK Youth Parliament.

Parliament of the United Kingdom
Constituency established	Member of Parliament for Mid Kent; 1983–1997	Constituency abolished
Constituency established	Member of Parliament for Faversham and Mid Kent; 1997–2001	Succeeded by Hugh Robertson
