= Edward Scott (MP for Maidstone) =

British politician (died 1868)

Member of Parliament for Maidstone
- In office 30 March 1857 – 30 April 1859 Serving with Alexander Beresford Hope
- Preceded by: James Whatman; William Lee
- Succeeded by: Charles Buxton; William Lee

Personal details
- Died: 1868
- Party: Conservative

Edward Scott (died 1868) was a British Conservative Party politician.

Scott was elected Conservative MP for Maidstone at the 1857 general election and held the seat until 1859 when he did not seek re-election.

Parliament of the United Kingdom
Preceded by James Whatman; William Lee	Member of Parliament for Maidstone; 1857 – 1859; With: Alexander Beresford Hope	Succeeded by Charles Buxton; William Lee
