= Thomas Law Hodges =

English politician

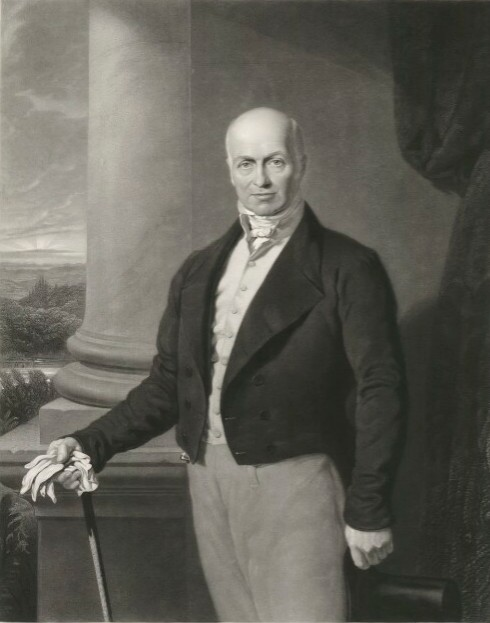
Thomas Law Hodges

Thomas Law Hodges (1776 – 14 May 1857) was an English Whig Party politician who sat in the House of Commons variously between 1830 and 1852.

Hodges was the son of Thomas Hallet Hodges of Hemsted Park in Kent and his wife Dorothy Cartwright, daughter of William Cartwright of Marnham Hall Nottinghamshire. He was a Deputy Lieutenant for Kent, a J.P. for Kent and Sussex and chairman of the quarter sessions. He was a major in the West Kent Militia.

At the 1830 general election, Hodges was elected as a Member of Parliament (MP) for Kent. He was re-elected in 1831, and held the seat until it was divided under the Great Reform Act in 1832. At the 1832 general election he was elected as an MP for West Kent, holding that seat until 1841, when two Conservative Party candidates were elected unopposed. He was returned for West Kent at a contested election in 1847 and held the seat until his defeat at the 1852 general election.

Hodges lived at Hemsted Place, Cranbrook, Kent, and died at the age of 80.

Hodges married Rebecca Twisden, daughter of Sir Roger Twisden, Bt in 1802. His son Thomas Twisden Hodges was also a politician.

Parliament of the United Kingdom
Preceded by William Philip Honywood; Sir Edward Knatchbull, Bt	Member of Parliament for Kent; 1830 – 1832; With: Sir Edward Knatchbull, Bt to 1831; Thomas Rider from 1831	Constituency divided
New constituency	Member of Parliament for West Kent; 1832 – 1841; With: Thomas Rider to 1835; Sir William Geary, Bt 1835–38; Sir Edmund Filmer, Bt 1838–41	Succeeded by Viscount Marsham; Sir Edmund Filmer, Bt
Preceded by Thomas Austen; Sir Edmund Filmer, Bt	Member of Parliament for West Kent; 1847 – 1852; With: Sir Edmund Filmer, Bt	Succeeded by William Masters Smith; Sir Edmund Filmer, Bt
