= Editha Aceituna Thurlow Griffin =

British writer

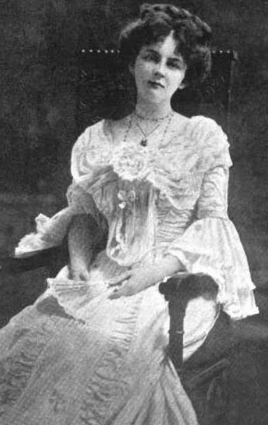
- E. Aceituna Griffin, from a 1906 publication
- Born: Editha Aceituna Thurlow; 12 July 1876; Gibraltar
- Died: 10 June 1949; Kensington
- Occupation: Writer
- Known for: Mystery and historical romance novels
- Relatives: George Dodd (grandfather)

Editha Aceituna Thurlow Griffin (12 July 1876 – 10 June 1949) was a British writer, usually credited as E. Aceituna Griffin. She was the author of more than a dozen mystery and historical romance novels.

== Early life ==
Editha Aceituna Thurlow was born in Gibraltar, the daughter of British parents, Edward Hovell Thurlow and Georgina Violet Dodd Thurlow. Her father was a cavalry officer. Her grandfather George Dodd was a Member of Parliament. Her middle name, spelled in various ways in British records, is a Spanish word for "olive".

== Career ==
Griffin wrote murder mysteries and historical romances. Books by Griffin included Lady Sarah's Deed of Gift (1906), A Servant of the King (1906), Mrs. Vanneck (1907), The Tavistocks (1909), Pearl and Plain (1927), Amber and Jade (1928), Genesta (1930), Conscience (1931), Delia's Dilemma (1934), Motive for Murder (1935, co-written with her daughter Joy Griffin), The Punt Murder (1936), Commandments Six and Eight (1936), Sweets and Sinners (1937), and Where There Is a Will (1939). She wrote stories in the same genres, including "The Spectre of the Severn Tunnel" (1899), "Selling Off" (1900), "Pride of Race" (1901), and "The Nemesis of a Crime" (serialized in 1939). She was reported to have written two short plays.

Griffin's earlier novel The Tavistocks was described approvingly in an Australian newspaper as "free from maudlin sentiment, and upholds a high moral and conventional tone". But another Australian reviewer believed her novel Mrs. Vanneck "possesses none of the graces that should adorn a character study, but nearly all the faults that can distress a reader, even if he only reads for amusement." A 1936 British review of her Motive for Murder found the novel "sophisticated" and "with almost sinister competence."

== Personal life ==
Editha Aceituna Thurlow married army officer Robert Chaloner Griffin (1871–1954) in 1905. They lived in Berkshire and had a son, Robert (1906–1990), and a daughter, Ursula Mary Joy (1913–1973, known as Joy). E. Aceituna Griffin died in 1949, aged 72 years, at her home in Kensington.
