= Hugh Robertson (businessman) =

British politician (born 1962)

The Right Honourable Sir Hugh Robertson KCMG DL
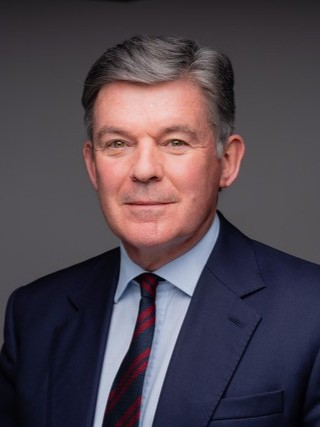
- Robertson in 2024

Chairman of Birmingham Airport
- In office 24 November 2016 – 2025
- President: The Princess Royal
- Preceded by: The Lord Coe
- Succeeded by: Katherine Grainger

Minister of State for Middle East and North Africa
- In office 7 October 2013 – 14 July 2014
- Prime Minister: David Cameron
- Preceded by: Alistair Burt
- Succeeded by: Tobias Ellwood

Minister for Sport
- In office 14 May 2010 – 7 October 2013
- Prime Minister: David Cameron
- Preceded by: Gerry Sutcliffe
- Succeeded by: Helen Grant

Member of Parliament for Faversham and Mid Kent
- In office 7 June 2001 – 30 March 2015
- Preceded by: Andrew Rowe
- Succeeded by: Helen Whately

Personal details
- Born: 9 October 1962 (age 63) Canterbury, Kent, England
- Party: Conservative
- Spouse: Anna Copson (m. 2002)
- Children: 1
- Education: The King's School, Canterbury
- Alma mater: University of Reading
- Website: www.hughrobertson.co.uk

Military service
- Allegiance: United Kingdom
- Branch/service: British Army
- Years of service: 1982–1995
- Rank: Major
- Unit: The Life Guards

Sir Hugh Michael Robertson KCMG PC DL (born 9 October 1962) is a British businessman and former politician who serves as Independent Chair of Birmingham Airport; Independent Non-Executive of Deloitte UK and a Member of their Global Advisory Board; and Elected Member of the International Olympic Committee (IOC). He was the Chair of Camelot Group, operator of the National Lottery, between 2018 and 2023.

He was the Member of Parliament (MP) for Faversham and Mid Kent from 2001 to 2015.

He was Minister of State for Foreign and Commonwealth Affairs until July 2014, having previously been the Minister for Sport and for the Olympics.

== Education ==
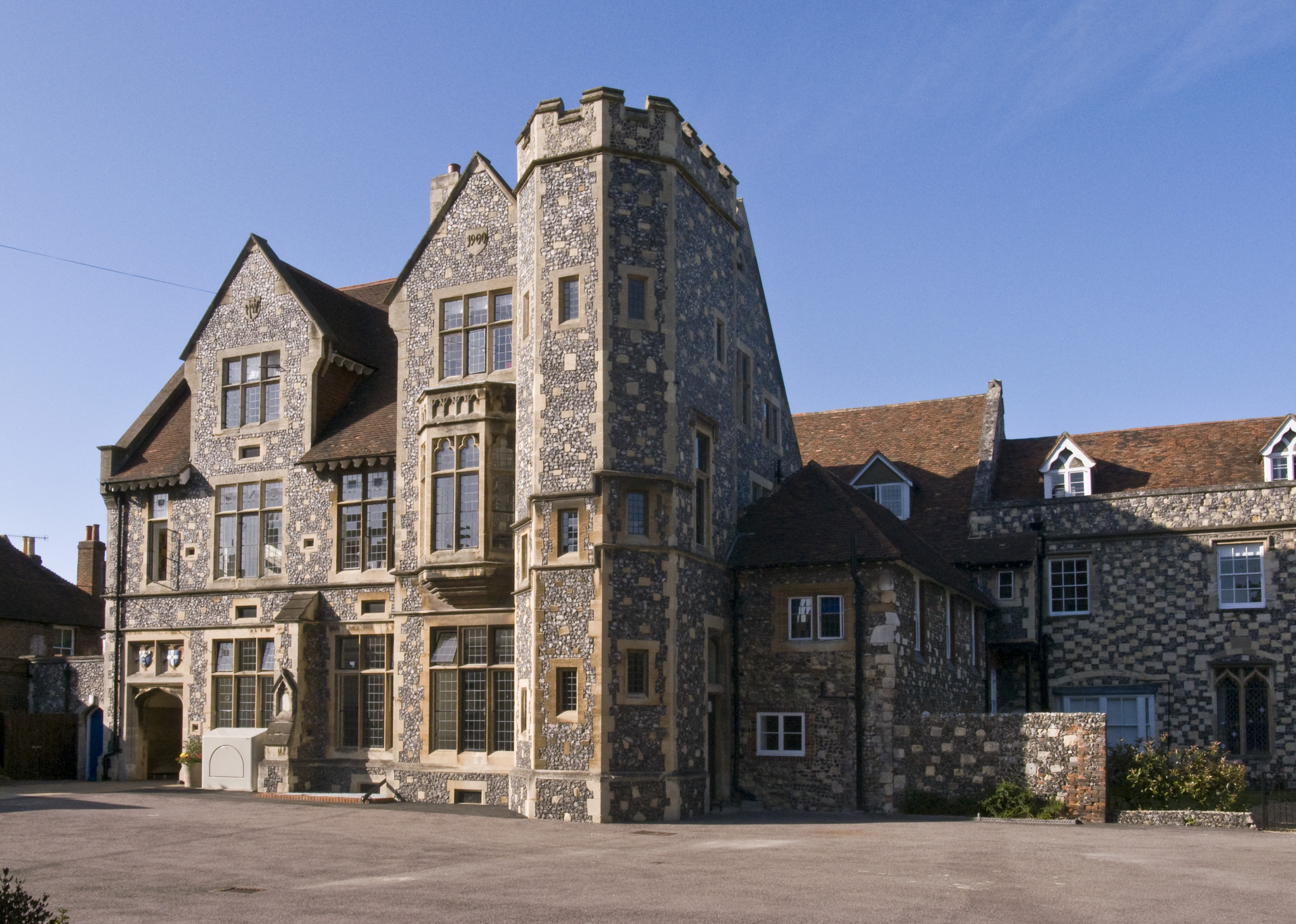
The King's School, Canterbury

Robertson was educated at The King's School, Canterbury. He read Land Management at the University of Reading from 1982 to 1985, obtaining a BSc (Hons) degree, before attending the RMA Sandhurst between 1985 and 1986.

In March 2014, Robertson was awarded a Distinguished Fellowship by the University of Reading in recognition of the role he played in the London 2012 Olympics.

== Career ==
Robertson served as an officer in the Life Guards from 1982 to 1995, rising to the rank of Major. Robertson saw active service in Northern Ireland, Cyprus, The Gulf War and served with the UN peacekeeping force UNPROFOR in Bosnia and Herzegovina. In 1993, he commanded the Household Cavalary for the Queen's birthday parade at the state opening of Parliament.

From 1995 until 2001, he was a banker with the investment management division of Schroders, then head of new business development for the property division.

=== Parliamentary career ===
Robertson was the Member of Parliament for the constituency of Faversham and Mid Kent from 2001-2015.

Having shadowed this post in Opposition, he was appointed a Parliamentary Under-Secretary of State as the Minister for Sport and the Olympics in the Department for Culture, Media and Sport in May 2010.

In September 2012, he was appointed as Minister of State in the Department of Culture, Media and Sport as the Minister for Sport, Olympic Legacy Tourism, and was sworn as a Privy Councillor in October.

In October 2013, he was appointed Minister of State at the Foreign and Commonwealth Office.

He stood down from government in the 2014 reshuffle and was knighted for his work as Minister for the Olympics during London 2012 and his work in the Middle East.

In January 2015 Robertson announced that he would stand down from Parliament at the next general election.

=== Post-Parliamentary appointments ===
In June 2015, Robertson was appointed a Deputy Lieutenant of Kent. In November 2016, he succeeded Sebastian Coe as Chair of the British Olympic Association. He held this role until 2025.

From 2017 to 2023 Robertson served as the Independent Chair of the Sports Honours Committee.

From 2018 to 2023, Robertson was the Chair of Camelot Group.

From 2022 to 2024 he was a Board Advisor of Genus Sports.

In June 2023, he was announced as the new Chair of Birmingham Airport. In 2024, Robertson became a member of the International Olympic Committee.

Since 2024 Robertson serves as an Independent Non-Executive on the Board of Deloitte (UK) and as a Member of their Global Advisory Board.

Robertson was appointed Honorary Colonel of the Kent Army Cadet Force on 1 June 2026.

== Personal life ==
Robertson married Anna Copson in May 2002. The wedding had to be rescheduled at short notice after the death of Queen Elizabeth the Queen Mother. They have one son.

== Honours ==
Sir Hugh has received the following decorations:

- KCMG
- General Service Medal
- UNFICYP Medal
- Gulf War Medal
- UNPROFOR Medal (Bosnia)
- NATO Medal (Former Yugoslavia)
- Brunei Meritorious Service Medal.

Parliament of the United Kingdom
Preceded by Andrew Rowe	Member of Parliament for Faversham and Mid Kent; 2001–2015	Succeeded by Helen Whately
Political offices
Preceded by Gerry Sutcliffe	Minister for Sport; 2010–2013	Succeeded by Helen Grant
Preceded by Alistair Burt	Minister of State for Foreign and Commonwealth Affairs; 2013–2014	Succeeded by Tobias Ellwood
