= Faversham and Mid Kent =

UK Parliament constituency (since 1997)

Coordinates: 51.29°N 0.77°E

- County constituency for the House of Commons
- Interactive map of boundaries from 2024
- Boundary of Faversham and Mid Kent in South East England
- County: Kent
- Electorate: 71,798 (2023)
- Major settlements: Faversham; Shepway; Boxley

Current constituency
- Created: 1997
- Member of Parliament: Helen Whately (Conservative)
- Seats: One
- Created from: Faversham; Mid Kent

Faversham and Mid Kent is a constituency (Note: A county constituency (for the purposes of election expenses and type of returning officer)) represented in the House of Commons of the UK Parliament. Since 2015, the seat has been held by Helen Whately of the Conservative Party. (Note: As with all constituencies, the constituency elects one Member of Parliament (MP) by the first past the post system of election at least every five years.)

== Constituency profile ==
Faversham and Mid Kent is a rural constituency located in Kent. Its largest settlement is the town of Faversham, which has a population of around 23,000. Other settlements include some eastern suburbs of the town of Maidstone (Weavering, Bearsted and Shepway) and the villages of Lenham and Teynham. Faversham is a historic market town traditionally known for its explosives industry. The constituency contains Leeds Castle, a popular tourist site. Wealth in the constituency is divided; Faversham has average levels of deprivation, Shepway is more deprived and Weavering and Bearsted are affluent. House prices are marginally higher than the national average.

In general, residents of the constituency are older and have low levels of education. Household income is in line with the rest of South East England and high compared to the rest of the country. White people made up 94% of the population at the 2021 census. At the local council level, Faversham is mostly represented by Liberal Democrats, the Maidstone suburbs by the Labour Party and the rural areas by a mixture of Greens, Conservatives and independents. An estimated 59% of voters in Faversham and Mid Kent supported leaving the European Union in the 2016 referendum, higher than the nationwide figure of 52%.

== History ==
In 1997, the Faversham and Mid Kent constituency was formed when the previous Faversham seat was abolished and split into Sittingbourne and Sheppey and the town of Faversham which was then merged with Mid Kent to form this constituency.

It has been held by members of the Conservative Party throughout its existence.

== Boundaries ==
Map of boundaries 2010–2024

1997–2010: The Borough of Swale wards of Abbey, Boughton & Courtenay, Davington Priory, East Downs, St Ann's, Teynham and Lynsted, and Watling, and the Borough of Maidstone wards of Bearsted, Boxley, Detling, Harrietsham and Lenham, Headcorn, Hollingbourne, Langley, Leeds, Park Wood, Shepway East, Shepway West, Sutton Valence, and Thurnham.

The boundary change in 1997 caused some confusion among a large minority of residents of the Maidstone electoral wards as a constituency named Maidstone and The Weald was also created at the same time (largely replacing the former Maidstone constituency), but residents in the Shepway and Park Wood areas of the town found themselves in Faversham and Mid Kent instead.

2010–2024: The Borough of Swale wards of Abbey, Boughton and Courtenay, Davington Priory, East Downs, St Ann's, and Watling, and the Borough of Maidstone wards of Bearsted, Boughton Monchelsea and Chart Sutton, Boxley, Detling and Thurnham, Downswood and Otham, Harrietsham and Lenham, Headcorn, Leeds, North Downs, Park Wood, Shepway North, Shepway South, and Sutton Valence and Langley.

2024–present: Under the 2023 periodic review of Westminster constituencies, the constituency was defined as comprising the following, as they existed on 1 December 2020:

- The Borough of Maidstone wards of Bearsted, Boxley, Detling and Thurnham, Downswood and Otham, Harrietsham and Lenham, Leeds, North Downs, Park Wood, Shepway North, and Shepway South.
- The Borough of Swale wards of Abbey, Boughton and Courtenay, East Downs, Priory, St Ann's, Teynham and Lynsted, Watling, and West Downs.

The Swale wards of Teynham and Lynstead, and West Downs were transferred in from Sittingbourne and Sheppey, offset by the loss of the Maidstone wards of Boughton Monchelsea and Chart Sutton, Headcorn, and Sutton Valence and Langley to the new constituency of Weald of Kent.

Following a local government boundary review in Maidstone which came into effect in May 2024, the constituency now comprises the following from the 2024 general election:

- The Borough of Maidstone wards or part wards of: Bearsted & Downswood; Boughton Monchelsea & Chart Sutton (small part); Boxley Downs; Grove Green & Vinters Park (part); Harrietsham, Lenham & North Downs; Leeds & Langley (except Langley parish); Park Wood & Mangravet; Senacre; Shepway.
- The Borough of Swale wards of: Abbey; Boughton and Courtenay; East Downs; Priory; St Ann's; Teynham and Lynsted; Watling; West Downs.

== Members of Parliament ==
Election	Member	Party
1997	Andrew Rowe	Conservative
2001	Sir Hugh Robertson	Conservative
2015	Helen Whately	Conservative

== Elections ==
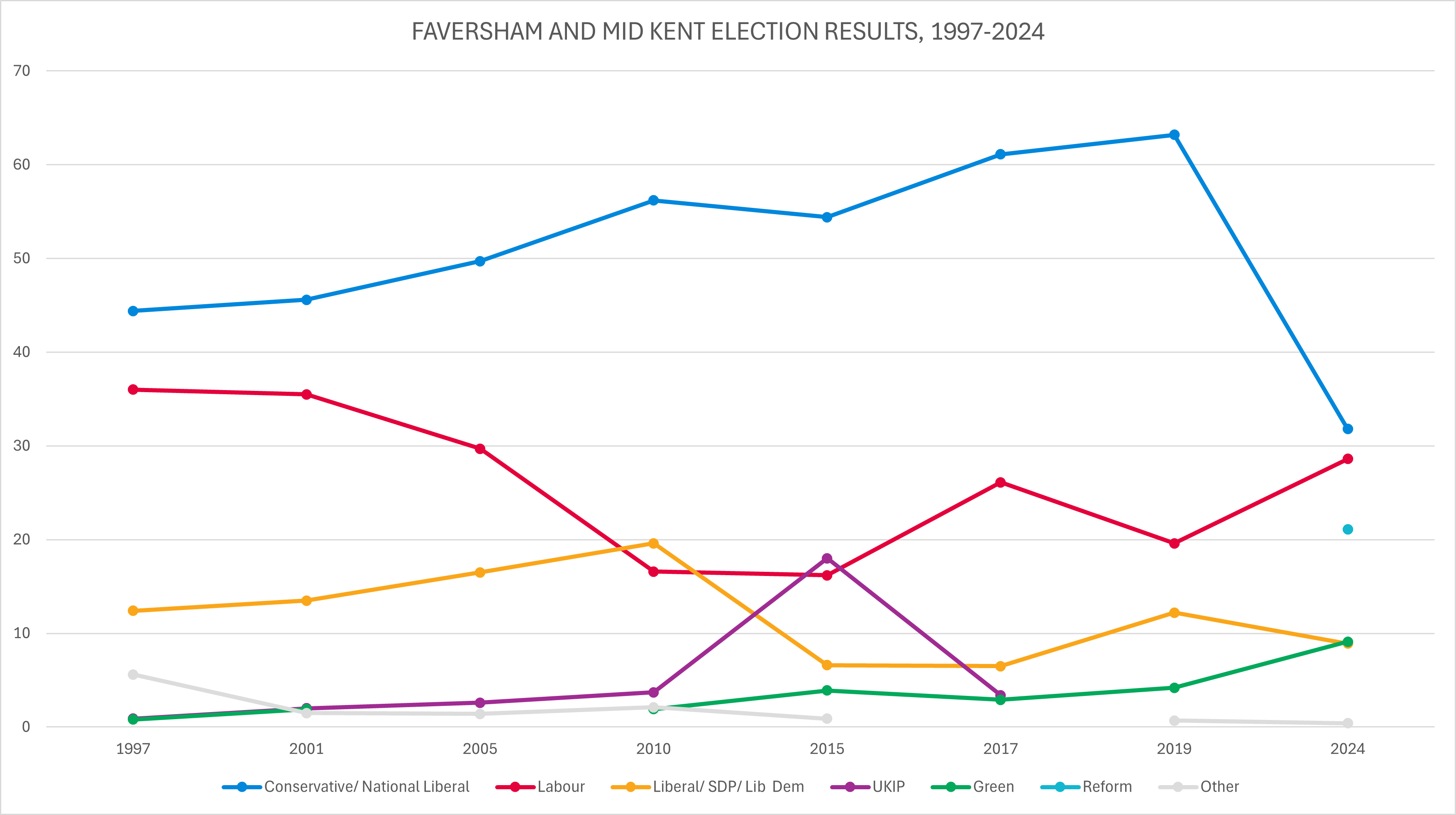
Election results 1997–2024

=== Elections in the 2020s ===
General election 2024: Faversham and Mid Kent
Party	Candidate	Votes	%	±%
Conservative	Helen Whately	14,816	31.8	−30.8
Labour	Mel Dawkins	13,347	28.6	+8.8
Reform	Maxwell Harrison	9,884	21.2	New
Green	Hannah Temple	4,218	9.1	+5.0
Liberal Democrats	Hannah Perkin	4,158	8.9	−3.6
British Democrats	Lawrence Rustem	171	0.4	New
Majority		1,469	3.2	−39.6
Turnout		46,594	62.7	−4.5
Registered electors		74,301		
Conservative hold		Swing	−19.8	

=== Elections in the 2010s ===
2019 notional result
Party	Vote	%
Conservative	30,187	62.6
Labour	9,569	19.8
Liberal Democrats	6,011	12.5
Green	1,974	4.1
Others	474	1.0
Turnout	48,215	67.2
Electorate	71,798	

General election 2019: Faversham and Mid Kent
Party	Candidate	Votes	%	±%
Conservative	Helen Whately	31,864	63.2	+2.1
Labour	Jenny Reeves	9,888	19.6	−6.5
Liberal Democrats	Hannah Perkin	6,170	12.2	+5.7
Green	Hannah Temple	2,103	4.2	+1.3
Independent	Gary Butler	369	0.7	New
Majority		21,976	43.6	+8.6
Turnout		50,394	68.7	−0.2
Conservative hold		Swing	+4.3	

General election 2017: Faversham and Mid Kent
Party	Candidate	Votes	%	±%
Conservative	Helen Whately	30,390	61.1	+6.7
Labour	Michael Desmond	12,977	26.1	+9.9
Liberal Democrats	David Naghi	3,249	6.5	−0.1
UKIP	Mark McGiffin	1,702	3.4	−14.6
Green	Alastair Gould	1,431	2.9	−1.0
Majority		17,413	35.0	−1.4
Turnout		49,749	68.9	+3.0
Conservative hold		Swing	−1.6	

General election 2015: Faversham and Mid Kent
Party	Candidate	Votes	%	±%
Conservative	Helen Whately	24,895	54.4	−1.8
UKIP	Peter Edwards-Daem	8,243	18.0	+14.3
Labour	Michael Desmond	7,403	16.2	−0.4
Liberal Democrats	David Naghi	3,039	6.6	−13.1
Green	Tim Valentine	1,768	3.9	+2.0
Monster Raving Loony	Hairy Knorm Davidson	297	0.6	−0.2
English Democrat	Gary Butler	158	0.3	New
Majority		16,652	36.4	−0.2
Turnout		45,803	65.9	−1.9
Conservative hold		Swing	−8.1	

General election 2010: Faversham and Mid Kent
Party	Candidate	Votes	%	±%
Conservative	Hugh Robertson	26,250	56.2	+6.1
Liberal Democrats	David Naghi	9,162	19.6	+2.9
Labour	Ashok Rehal	7,748	16.6	−12.5
UKIP	Sarah Larkins	1,722	3.7	+1.0
Green	Tim Valentine	890	1.9	New
National Front	Graham Kemp	542	1.2	New
Monster Raving Loony	Hairy Knorm Davidson	398	0.9	−0.6
Majority		17,088	36.6	+16.6
Turnout		46,712	67.8	+2.6
Conservative hold		Swing	+1.6	

=== Elections in the 2000s ===
General election 2005: Faversham and Mid Kent
Party	Candidate	Votes	%	±%
Conservative	Hugh Robertson	21,690	49.7	+4.1
Labour	Andrew Bradstock	12,970	29.7	−5.8
Liberal Democrats	David Naghi	7,204	16.5	+3.0
UKIP	Robert Thompson	1,152	2.6	+0.6
Monster Raving Loony	Norman Davidson	610	1.4	New
Majority		8,720	20.0	+9.9
Turnout		43,626	65.7	+5.3
Conservative hold		Swing	+4.9	

General election 2001: Faversham and Mid Kent
Party	Candidate	Votes	%	±%
Conservative	Hugh Robertson	18,739	45.6	+1.2
Labour	Grahame Birchall	14,556	35.5	−0.5
Liberal Democrats	Michael Sole	5,529	13.5	+1.1
UKIP	James Gascoyne	828	2.0	+1.1
Green	Penelope Kemp	799	1.9	+1.2
Rock 'n' Roll Loony	Norman Davidson	600	1.5	New
Majority		4,183	10.1	+1.7
Turnout		41,051	60.4	−13.1
Conservative hold		Swing	+0.9	

=== Elections in the 1990s ===
General election 1997: Faversham and Mid Kent
Party	Candidate	Votes	%	±%
Conservative	Andrew Rowe	22,016	44.4	
Labour	Alan Stewart	17,843	36.0	
Liberal Democrats	Bruce E. Parmenter	6,138	12.4	
Referendum	Robin M. Birley	2,073	4.2	
Monster Raving Loony	Norman W. Davidson	511	1.0	
UKIP	Michael J. Cunningham	431	0.9	
Green	David J. Currer	380	0.8	
Green Referendum Lawless Naturally Street Party	Caroline Morgan	115	0.2	
Natural Law	Nigel P.J. Pollard	99	0.2	
Majority		4,173	8.4	
Turnout		49,606	73.5	
Conservative win (new seat)				

== See also ==
- List of parliamentary constituencies in Kent
- List of parliamentary constituencies in the South East England (region)

== Sources ==
- Election result, 2005 (BBC)
- Election results, 1997 – 2001 (BBC)
- Election results, 1997 – 2001 (Election Demon)
- Election results, 1997 – 2005 (Guardian)
