= 1878 West Kent by-election =

UK Parliamentary by-election

The 1878 West Kent by-election was fought on 15 May 1878. The by-election was fought due to the resignation in order to contest Oxford University of the incumbent Conservative MP, John Gilbert Talbot. It was won by the unopposed Conservative candidate Viscount Lewisham.
