= William Smith-Masters =

English cricketer

Personal information
- Full name: William Allan Smith-Masters
- Born: William Allan Cowburn; 13 March 1850; Humber, Herefordshire, England
- Died: 27 August 1937 (aged 87); Camer Park, Kent, England
- Relatives: Revd Allan Cowburn (father); Sir Fleetwood Edwards (brother-in-law); Spencer Gore (brother-in-law)

Domestic team information
- Years: Team
- 1875: Kent

Career statistics
Competition	First-class
Matches	1
Runs scored	7
Batting average	7.00
100s/50s	0/0
Top score	7
Catches/stumpings	0/–
- Source: Cricinfo, 5 December 2010

William Allan Smith-Masters JP (né Cowburn; 13 March 1850 – 27 August 1937), was an English cricketer and landowner.

Smith-Masters made his sole first-class appearance for Kent, selected by Lord Harris, in 1875 against Hampshire at the Winchester College Ground (Kent CCC winning by an innings and 217 runs). Scoring 7 runs batting at number 8, his wicket was taken by Henry Tate caught behind by Lionel Hervey-Bathurst, whom he ran out in Hampshire's second innings.

Smith-Masters was a right-handed amateur cricketer who played for North Kent and scored at least three recorded centuries.[4]

== Early life and career ==
The elder son of the Revd Allan Smith-Masters (16 January 1820 – 8 October 1875) and Rebecca née Randall (died 1907), she was the daughter of the Ven. James Randall, Archdeacon of Berkshire, by his wife Rebecca née Lowndes. His father was Rector of Humber, Herefordshire (1844–55) then Vicar of Tidenham, Gloucestershire (1855–62).

Educated at Marlborough College, Smith-Masters went up to Brasenose College, Oxford (BA proceeding MA, 1875), and played cricket for BNC in 1872 against the England XI.

In 1875, Smith-Masters inherited the Camer estate with the lordships of the manors of Luddesdowne and Dodmore, and was appointed a JP for Kent.

== Family and arms ==
Smith-Masters had a distinguished extended family. Descended from the Masters family who lived at Camer in Kent since the 16th century, his cousins were the Smith baronets.

His father, Allan Cowburn later Smith-Masters, played first-class cricket for Oxford University before assuming by Royal Licence, on 28 August 1862, the surname and arms of Smith-Masters, in right of his mother Katharine Cowburn née Masters Smith (1794–1873), eldest sister of William Masters Smith MP, High Sheriff of Kent.

By his first marriage in 1876 to Mary Smith Coxe (died 1915), he had one daughter, Edith Smith-Masters (1879–1962) who married in 1908 Colonel Oliver Henry North DSO (died 1954), brother of Brigadier-General Bordrigge North CB, MVO, leaving four sons. His second marriage in 1919 to Kathleen Gore (died 1965) produced no children.

His brother-in-law, Spencer Gore, played first-class cricket for Surrey, before winning tennis' first Wimbledon Championships. His other brother-in-law, Sir Fleetwood Edwards, Keeper of the Privy Purse to Queen Victoria, also played first-class cricket in one match for I Zingari.

His younger brother was the Revd John Smith-Masters FRHistS (1856–1940), Rector of Yattendon, Berkshire, who married in 1888, Eliza Margaret (died 1941), younger daughter of Swinton Melville, late Bengal Civil Service, having issue,

- 1. Ernest Leslie Smith-Masters (1889–1963), married 1915 Joan Mary Dickinson (died 1985), eldest daughter of the Revd George Lowes Dickinson, Rector of Drayton Parslow by his wife Evelyn Brougham, leaving (with two daughters):
  - Colonel George Leslie Melville Smith-Masters (1916–1988), late RASC;
- 2. Revd Harold Allan Smith-Masters (1890–1968), married 1914 Elizabeth Palmer (died 1968), only daughter of Montague Palmer (1837–1915), leaving:
  - Anthony Bruce Smith-Masters (1916–1998);
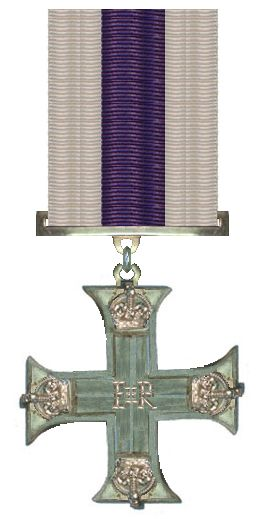
- 3. Captain Bruce Swinton Smith-Masters MC (1892–1916), Essex Regiment;
- 4. Lieutenant George Arthur Smith-Masters (1894–1915), Bedfordshire Regiment.

=== Arms ===
Coat of arms of William Smith-Masters

Adopted
1862 (College of Arms)
Crest
1, a Lion rampant double-queued Argent charged with Roses Gules and holding between the Paws a Cross flory (for MASTERS);
2, a Talbot Sable collared lined and charged with three Cross-crosslets fitchées Argent resting the Centre-foot upon an Escutcheon Or thereon a Martlet Azure (for SMITH).
Escutcheon
Quarterly 1st and 4th, Per saltire Argent and Sable a Chief of the First therefrom issuant a Lion rampant double-queued Sable holding a Rose Gules slipped Proper (for MASTERS); 2nd and 3rd, Per pale Or and Azure a plain Fesse cottised wavy between three Martlets in chief and one in base Counterchanged (for SMITH).
Motto
Manet Intemerata Fides (Latin)
(English: Faith Unyielded)

== See also ==
- William Masters Smith
- Camer Park

== Bibliography ==
- Carlaw, Derek (2020). Kent County Cricketers, A to Z: Part One (1806–1914) (PDF). Cardiff: ACS.
