= Allan Cowburn =

English cricketer and clergyman

Personal information
- Full name: Allan Cowburn
- Born: 16 January 1820; St Pancras, Middlesex, England
- Died: 8 October 1875 (aged 55); Meopham, Kent, England
- Relatives: William Smith-Masters (son); Fleetwood Edwards (son-in-law); Spencer Gore (son-in-law)

Domestic team information
- Years: Team
- 1841: Oxford University

Career statistics
Competition	First-class
Matches	3
Runs scored	17
Batting average	4.25
100s/50s	0/0
Top score	9
Balls bowled	?
Wickets	12
Bowling average	?
5 wickets in innings	1
10 wickets in match	0
Best bowling	5/?
Catches/stumpings	1/–
- Source: Cricinfo, 15 January 2020

The Reverend Allan Cowburn (later known as Allan Cowburn-Masters-Smith; 16 January 1820 – 8 October 1875) was an English first-class cricketer and clergyman.

The son of William Cowburn, he was born in January 1820 at St Pancras. He was educated at Winchester College, before going up to Exeter College, Oxford. While studying at Oxford, Cowburn played three first-class cricket matches for Oxford University in 1841, playing twice against the Marylebone Cricket Club and once against Cambridge University in The University Match. Playing as a bowler, he took 12 wickets and took a five wicket haul on a single occasion. After graduating from Oxford, he took holy orders in the Anglican Church. He was the vicar of Tidenham in Gloucestershire from 1854 to 1862. He later changed his surname to Cowburn-Masters-Smith. He died in October 1875 at Meopham, Kent. His son, William, was also a first-class cricketer.
