= Thomas Rider (MP for Kent) =

British politician

Thomas Rider (20 August 1785 – 6 August 1847) was a British Whig politician who held a seat in the House of Commons from 1831 to 1835. He was the eldest son of Ingram Rider of Leeds, Yorkshire and educated at Charterhouse School (1776) and University College, Oxford (1783).

== Offices held ==
He was appointed High Sheriff of Kent for 1829–30. He was elected at the 1831 general election as a member of parliament (MP) for Kent, and held the seat until the constituency was divided under the Reform Act 1832. At the 1832 general election he was returned as an MP for the new Western division of Kent, but at the 1835 election he polled poorly, and withdrew from the election at the end of the first day of polling. At the 1837 general election he contested the Eastern division of Kent, but failed to unseat either of the two sitting Conservative Party MPs.

== Death ==
He died on 6 August 1847, aged 81.

== Family ==
He had married Mary Ann Elizabeth Pinnock, but had no children.

Parliament of the United Kingdom
Preceded by Sir Edward Knatchbull, 9th Bt; Thomas Law Hodges	Member of Parliament for Kent; 1831 – 1832; With: Thomas Law Hodges	Constituency divided
New constituency	Member of Parliament for West Kent; 1832 – 1835; With: Thomas Law Hodges	Succeeded by Sir William Geary, Bt; Thomas Law Hodges
