= Sir Edmund Filmer, 8th Baronet =

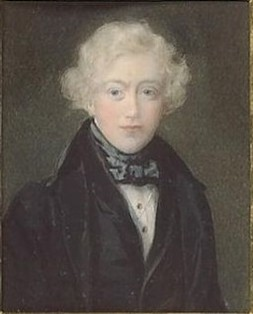
Sir Edmund Filmer, 1830 portrait

Sir Edmund Filmer, 8th Baronet (14 June 1809 – 8 January 1857) was an English Conservative Party politician.

== Life ==
He was the son of Edmund Filmer, a younger son of Sir Edmund Filmer, 6th Baronet, and his wife Emelia Skene, daughter of George Skene. He matriculated in 1827 at Oriel College, Oxford.

Filmer was elected to the House of Commons at a by-election in March 1838 as a Member of Parliament (MP) for West Kent, having unsuccessfully contested the same constituency at the 1837 general election. He held the seat until his death in 1857, aged 47. His son the 9th Baronet was elected as MP for West Kent in 1859.

In 1850 Sir Edmund built Leagrave Hall on land close to Luton in Bedfordshire which had been purchased in 1771 by Sir Beversham Filmer.

== Arms ==
Coat of arms of Sir Edmund Filmer, 8th Baronet
Crest A falcon volant Proper beaked and legged Or standing on a ruined castle of the last. Escutcheon Barry of six Or and Sable on a chief of the last three cinquefoils of the first.

Parliament of the United Kingdom
Preceded by Sir William Geary, Bt; Thomas Law Hodges	Member of Parliament for West Kent; 1838 – 1857; With: Thomas Law Hodges to 1841; Viscount Marsham 1841–1845; Thomas Austen 1845–1847; Thomas Law Hodges 1847–1852; William Masters Smith from 1852	Succeeded by Charles Wykeham Martin; William Masters Smith
Baronetage of England
Preceded by John Filmer	Baronet (of East Sutton); 1834–1857	Succeeded by Edmund Filmer
