= Edward Filmer =

English dramatist

Edward Filmer (c.1654–1703) was an English dramatist.

== Life ==
He was the second son of Sir Robert Filmer, 1st Baronet, of East Sutton, Kent, who died 22 March 1676, and his wife, Dorothy, daughter of Maurice Tuke of Layer Marney, Essex. In 1672 he was admitted as founder's kin fellow of All Souls' College, Oxford, and took the degree of B.A. on 17 December of that year, proceeding B.C.L. 21 February 1675, D.C.L. 27 October 1681. He was buried at East Sutton.

== Works ==
Filmer wrote a lengthy blank verse tragedy, The Unnatural Brother (published London, 1697), adapted from an episode in Cassandre, a romance by Gauthier de Costes, seigneur de la Calprenède. In terms of plot, it is considered derivative of Othello, and The Villain by Thomas Porter in the same tradition. It was acted at the theatre in Little Lincoln's Inn Fields, and was received coldly. Part of this drama was reproduced by Pierre Antoine Motteux as The Unfortunate Couple; a short Tragedy, in The Novelty (1697). The Novelty was then used as the basis for a 1704 play, The Unnatural Couple.

Filmer in his tragedy was swimming against the tide of recent fashion–for the music of John Eccles, the productions of The Indian Queen as semi-opera and George Powell's Brutus of Alba—in excluding music from his tragedy, a position he defended in the introduction to the published text. He pointed to features that he considered important (restriction of the number of characters on the stage at one time, in particular) as belonging to a classical tradition in drama he valued; the later 17th century London audience never favoured them.

In a later work, Filmer defended the stage itself against the attacks of Jeremy Collier in a treatise A Defence of Plays (posthumous publication in 1707). He brought to bear the argument that Collier failed to understand "Stage-Discipline" (i.e. poetic justice). Collier replied in A Farther Vindication of the Short View (London, 1708).

== Family ==
By license, dated 29 January 1687, Filmer married Archiballa, only daughter and heiress of Archibald Clinkard or Clenkard of Sutton Valence, Kent.
