= Mid Kent (constituency) =

Former parliamentary constituency in the United Kingdom

- Former county constituency for the House of Commons
- Mid Kent constituency in Kent, showing boundaries used from 1983–1997
- County: Kent
- Major settlements: Chatham, Maidstone (part)

1983–1997
- Seats: One
- Created from: Maidstone and Rochester & Chatham
- Replaced by: Chatham and Aylesford, Faversham & Mid Kent, Maidstone and the Weald

1868–1885
- Seats: Two
- Created from: West Kent
- Replaced by: Medway; Ashford; Tunbridge

Mid Kent was a parliamentary constituency in the county of Kent, which returned two Members of Parliament to the House of Commons of the Parliament of the United Kingdom.

It was created for the 1868 general election, and abolished for the 1885 general election, when the three two-member constituencies (East Kent, Mid Kent and West Kent) were replaced by several new single-member constituencies: Ashford, Dartford, Faversham, Isle of Thanet, Medway, St Augustines, Sevenoaks and Tunbridge.

It was recreated for the 1983 general election from parts of the seats of Rochester and Chatham & Maidstone, and abolished for the 1997 general election. In this form, it returned one Member of Parliament (MP) to the House of Commons of the Parliament of the United Kingdom.

== Boundaries ==
1868-1885: The Lathe of Aylesford, and the Lower Division of the Lathe of Scray.

1983–1997: The City of Rochester-upon-Medway wards of Holcombe, Horsted, Lordswood, Luton, Walderslade, Wayfield, and Weedswood, and the Borough of Maidstone wards of Bearsted, Boxley, Detling, East, Harrietsham and Lenham, Hollingbourne, North, and Thurnham.

The constituency was predominantly rural between the urban areas of Medway and Maidstone.

== Members of Parliament ==
Election	1st Member	1st Party	2nd Member	2nd Party
1868	William Hart Dyke	Conservative	William Amherst	Conservative
1880	William Hart Dyke	Conservative	Sir Edmund Filmer, Bt	Conservative
1884 by-election	William Hart Dyke	Conservative	John Gathorne-Hardy	Conservative
1885	constituency abolished			
1983	Andrew Rowe	Conservative		
1997	constituency abolished			

== Election results ==
=== Elections in the 1860s ===
General election 1868: Mid Kent
Party	Candidate	Votes	%	±%
Conservative	William Hart Dyke	3,251	26.6	
Conservative	William Amherst	3,248	26.5	
Liberal	John William Nicholas Hervey	2,872	23.5	
Liberal	Sir Francis Head, 2nd Baronet	2,868	23.4	
Majority		376	3.0	
Turnout		6,120 (est)	70.2 (est)	
Registered electors		8,723		
Conservative win (new seat)				
Conservative win (new seat)				

=== Elections in the 1870s ===
General election 1874: Mid Kent
Party	Candidate	Votes	%	±%
Conservative	William Hart Dyke	3,710	36.3	+9.7
Conservative	William Amherst	3,542	34.7	+8.2
Liberal	David Salomons	2,956	29.0	−17.9
Majority		586	5.7	+2.7
Turnout		6,582 (est)	73.9 (est)	+3.7
Registered electors		8,905		
Conservative hold		Swing	+9.3	
Conservative hold		Swing	+8.6	

=== Elections in the 1880s ===
General election 1880: Mid Kent
Party	Candidate	Votes	%	±%
Conservative	William Hart Dyke	4,056	28.6	−7.7
Conservative	Edmund Filmer	3,783	26.7	−8.0
Liberal	Edward Cazalet	3,318	23.4	+8.9
Liberal	Howard Elphinstone	3,020	21.3	+6.8
Majority		465	3.3	−2.4
Turnout		7,089 (est)	80.9 (est)	+7.0
Registered electors		8,763		
Conservative hold		Swing	−8.3	
Conservative hold		Swing	−7.4	

Filmer's resignation caused a by-election.

By-election, 15 May 1884: Mid Kent
Party	Candidate	Votes	%	±%
Conservative	John Gathorne-Hardy	Unopposed		
Conservative hold				

Dyke's appointment as Chief Secretary to the Lord Lieutenant of Ireland required a by-election.

By-election, 2 Jul 1885: Mid Kent
Party	Candidate	Votes	%	±%
Conservative	William Hart Dyke	Unopposed		
Conservative hold				

=== Elections in the 1980s ===
General election 1983: Mid Kent
Party	Candidate	Votes	%	±%
Conservative	Andrew Rowe	25,400	53.5	
Liberal	Allison Wainman	12,857	27.0	
Labour	Vernon Hull	8,928	18.8	
Independent	Dennis Delderfield	324	0.7	
Majority		12,543	26.5	
Turnout		47,509	71.4	
Conservative win (new seat)				

General election 1987: Mid Kent
Party	Candidate	Votes	%	±%
Conservative	Andrew Rowe	28,719	55.1	+1.6
Liberal	Graham Colley	13,951	26.8	−0.2
Labour	Jack Hazelgrove	9,420	18.1	−0.7
Majority		14,768	28.3	+1.8
Turnout		52,090	71.9	+0.5
Conservative hold		Swing	+0.9	

=== Elections in the 1990s ===
General election 1992: Mid Kent
Party	Candidate	Votes	%	±%
Conservative	Andrew Rowe	33,633	56.7	+1.6
Labour	Timothy Robson	13,984	23.6	+5.5
Liberal Democrats	Graham Colley	11,476	19.3	−7.5
Natural Law	Gerard Valente	224	0.4	New
Majority		19,649	33.1	+4.8
Turnout		59,317	79.7	+7.8
Conservative hold		Swing	−2.0	
