= Mary Georgina Filmer =

British artist (1838–1903)

- Born: Mary Georgina Caroline Cecil; 4 April 1838
- Died: 17 March 1903 (aged 64); London, United Kingdom
- Known for: Photomontage
- Spouse: Edmund Filmer

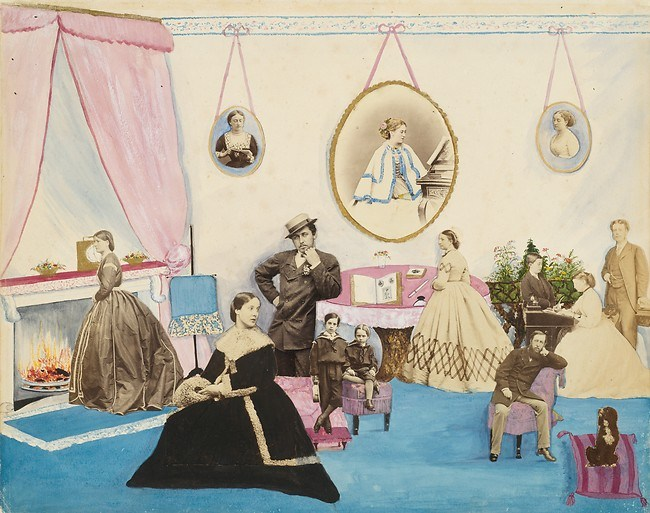
Collage by Mary Georgina Filmer (mid-1860s)

Lady Mary Georgina Filmer (née Cecil, 4 April 1838 – 17 March 1903) was an early proponent of the art of photographic collage.

A Victorian socialite, Lady Filmer produced several albums consisting of watercolour scenes decorated with photomontages. One of her works (from the so-called Filmer Album) depicts a drawing room, painted in watercolour, in which she has added photographic cut-outs from albumen silver prints. She positions herself next to a large figure of the Prince of Wales, with whom she was known to flirt. Her albums and glue pot are set out on a large table beside her. Much smaller, Sir Edmund Filmer, her husband, is seated next to a pet dog. In 2010, the work was included in an exhibition at the Art Institute of Chicago, which traveled to the Metropolitan Museum of Art, titled "Playing With Pictures: The Art of Victorian Photocollage".
