= HM Prison East Sutton Park =

Prison in England

Coordinates: 51.2152°N 0.6159°E

HMP/YOI East Sutton Park
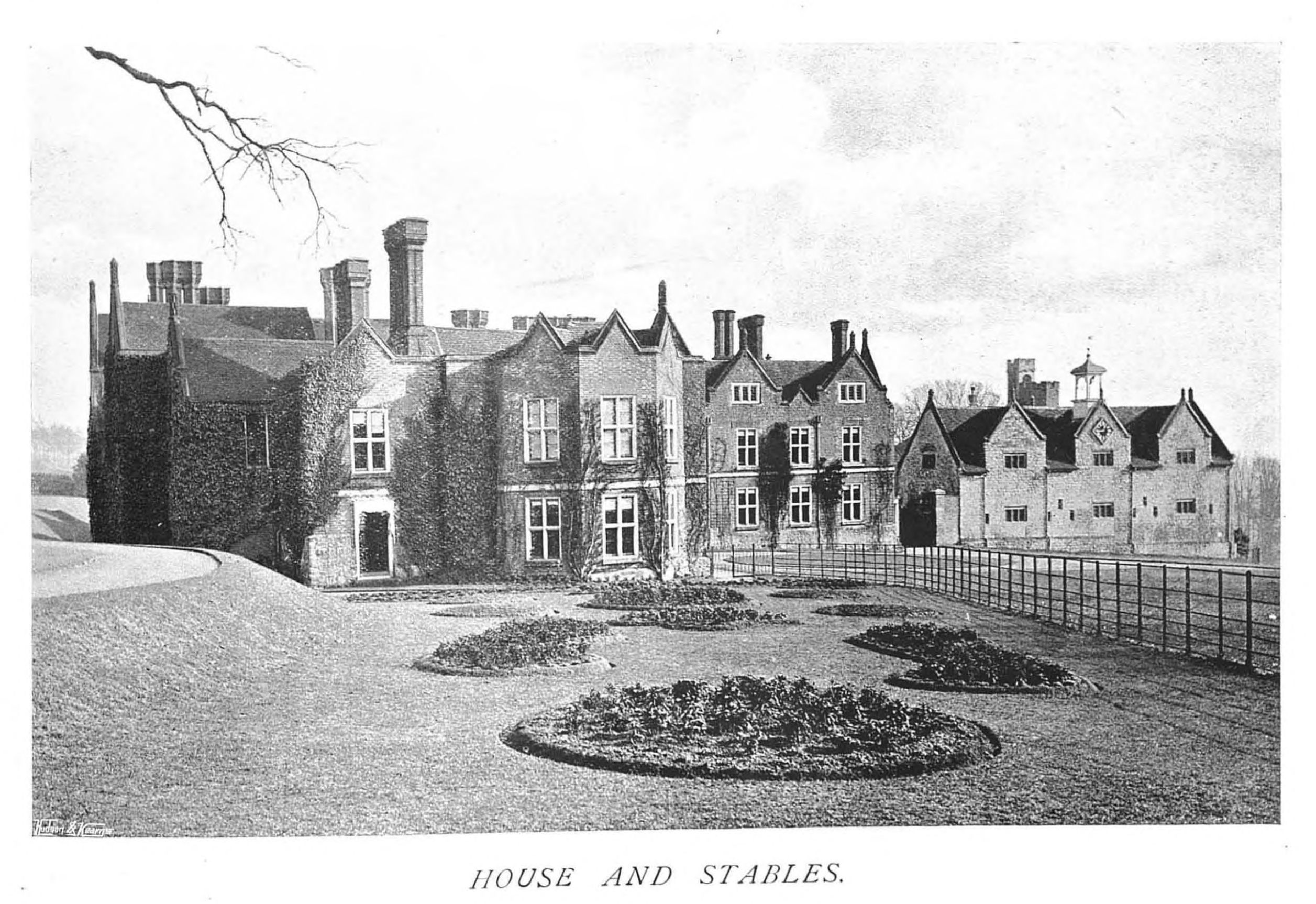
- The house in 1907
- Interactive map of HMP/YOI East Sutton Park
- Location: East Sutton, Kent
- Security class: Adult Females/Young Offenders
- Capacity: 90
- Opened: 1946
- Managed by: His Majesty's Prison and Probation Service
- Governor: Amy Dixon
- Website: East Sutton Park at justice.gov.uk

HM Prison East Sutton Park is a women's open prison and young offender's institute located in the Parish of East Sutton, near Maidstone in Kent, England. The prison is operated by His Majesty's Prison & Probation Service.

== History ==
East Sutton Park Prison is based in and around an Elizabethan brick house, East Sutton Park, dating from 1570 and overlooking the Weald of Kent. The building was requisitioned at the start of World War II, first opened as a borstal for girls in 1946, then was re-registered to take both juvenile and adult females some years later.

In 2016 a report by His Majesty's Chief Inspector of Prisons found "East Sutton Park to be an excellent prison where the very strong staff-prisoner relationships underpinned safety and a respectful and purposeful approach to preparing women for release. Violence of any kind was extremely rare and the tensions related to communal living were usually resolved through informal mediation rather than formal disciplinary processes".

== The prison today ==
Accommodation at the prison is divided into 66 rooms of varying sizes. Work at the prison for inmates includes farm work, horticulture, meat processing and catering. East Sutton Park also offers training courses and physical education. Approximately half the prison population work in the community.

== Notable former inmates ==
- Jane Andrews - Convicted in 2001 of murdering her lover, Thomas Cressman in 2000.
- Linda Calvey - Convicted of murder in 1991 after being involved in a conspiracy to fatally shoot her boyfriend, Ronnie Cook. She has been previously convicted of several armed robberies committed in the 1980s.
- Vicky Pryce - Convicted in 2013 of perverting the course of justice following a vehicular offence committed by her husband.
- Sarah Tisdall - Convicted in 1984 of sharing confidential government documents with The Guardian.
