= Sir Edmund Filmer, 9th Baronet =

English politician

Sir Edmund Filmer, 9th Baronet (11 July 1835 – 17 December 1886) was an English Conservative Party politician.

He was elected to the House of Commons at the 1859 general election as a member of parliament (MP) for West Kent. The seat had previously been held by his father, the 8th Baronet from 1838 until his death in 1857, but that 9th Baronet's tenure was shorter since he did not defend his seat at the next general election, 1865. He was appointed Sheriff of Kent for 1870.

Fifteen years later, Filmer returned to Parliament when he was elected at the 1880 general election as MP for Mid Kent. However he resigned his seat in 1884, by taking the Chiltern Hundreds.

Sir Edmund was married to Mary Georgina Filmer (née Cecil, 1838–1903), an early proponent of photomontage.

== Arms ==
Coat of arms of Sir Edmund Filmer, 9th Baronet
Crest A falcon volant Proper beaked and legged Or standing on a ruined castle of the last. Escutcheon Barry of six Or and Sable on a chief of the last three cinquefoils of the first.

Parliament of the United Kingdom
Preceded by Charles Wykeham Martin; James Whatman	Member of Parliament for West Kent; 1859 – 1865; With: Viscount Holmesdale	Succeeded by William Hart Dyke; Viscount Holmesdale
Preceded by Viscount Holmesdale; Sir William Hart Dyke, Bt	Member of Parliament for Mid Kent; 1880 – 1884; With: Sir William Hart Dyke, Bt	Succeeded by John Gathorne-Hardy; Sir William Hart Dyke, Bt
Baronetage of England
Preceded by Edmund Filmer	Baronet (of East Sutton); 1857–1886	Succeeded by Robert Marcus Filmer
