= West Kent (constituency) =

Former parliamentary constituency in the United Kingdom

- Former county constituency for the House of Commons
- Context of 1832-1868. Extract from 1837 result: the non-south coast striped area, south-east of London.
- County: Kent

1832–1885
- Seats: 2
- Created from: Kent
- Replaced by: Medway; Sevenoaks; Ashford; Dartford; Lewisham

West Kent (formally known as "Kent, Western") was a county constituency in Kent in South East England. It returned two Members of Parliament (MPs) to the House of Commons of the Parliament of the United Kingdom, elected by the first past the post system.

== History ==
The constituency was created by the Reform Act 1832 for the 1832 general election, and abolished by the Redistribution of Seats Act 1885 for the 1885 general election.

All three two-member constituencies in Kent were abolished in 1885: East Kent, Mid Kent and West Kent. They were replaced by eight new single-member constituencies: Ashford, Dartford, Faversham, Isle of Thanet, Medway, St Augustine's, Sevenoaks and Tunbridge.

== Boundaries ==
1832–1868: The Lathes of Sutton-at-Hone and Aylesford, and the Lower Division of the Lathe of Scray.

1868–1885: The Lathe of Sutton-at-Hone.

== Members of Parliament ==
Election	1st Member	1st Party	2nd Member	2nd Party
1832	Thomas Law Hodges	Whig	Thomas Rider	Whig
1835	Thomas Law Hodges	Whig	Sir William Geary, Bt	Conservative
1838 by-election	Thomas Law Hodges	Whig	Sir Edmund Filmer, Bt	Conservative
1841	Viscount Marsham	Conservative	Sir Edmund Filmer, Bt	Conservative
1845 by-election	Thomas Austen	Conservative	Sir Edmund Filmer, Bt	Conservative
1847	Thomas Law Hodges	Whig	Sir Edmund Filmer, Bt	Conservative
1852	William Masters Smith	Conservative	Sir Edmund Filmer, Bt	Conservative
Feb 1857 by-election	William Masters Smith	Conservative	Charles Wykeham Martin	Peelite
Apr 1857	James Whatman	Radical	Charles Wykeham Martin	Peelite
1859	Viscount Holmesdale	Conservative	Sir Edmund Filmer, Bt	Conservative
1865	Viscount Holmesdale	Conservative	William Hart Dyke	Conservative
1868	Sir Charles Mills, Bt	Conservative	John Gilbert Talbot	Conservative
1878 by-election	Sir Charles Mills, Bt	Conservative	Viscount Lewisham	Conservative
1885	constituency abolished			

== Election results ==
=== Elections in the 1830s ===
General election 1832: West Kent
Party	Candidate	Votes	%
Whig	Thomas Law Hodges	3,364	37.5
Whig	Thomas Rider	3,100	34.5
Tory	William Geary	2,518	28.0
Majority		582	6.5
Turnout		5,562	83.3
Registered electors		6,678	
Whig win (new seat)			
Whig win (new seat)			

General election 1835: West Kent
Party	Candidate	Votes	%	±%
Conservative	William Geary	2,558	38.4	+10.4
Whig	Thomas Law Hodges	2,092	31.4	−6.1
Whig	Thomas Rider	2,007	30.1	−4.4
Turnout		4,549	66.4	−16.9
Registered electors		6,850		
Majority		551	8.3	N/A
Conservative gain from Whig		Swing	+10.5	
Majority		85	1.3	−5.2
Whig hold		Swing	−5.7	

- Rider retired at the close of the first day's poll

General election 1837: West Kent
Party	Candidate	Votes	%	±%
Conservative	William Geary	3,584	35.3	+16.1
Whig	Thomas Law Hodges	3,334	32.9	−28.6
Conservative	Edmund Filmer	3,229	31.8	+12.6
Turnout		6,641	78.8	+12.4
Registered electors		8,432		
Majority		250	2.4	−5.9
Conservative hold		Swing	+15.2	
Majority		105	1.1	−0.2
Whig hold		Swing	−28.7	

Geary resigned, causing a by-election.

By-election, 5 March 1838: West Kent
Party	Candidate	Votes	%
Conservative	Edmund Filmer	Unopposed	
Conservative hold			

=== Elections in the 1840s ===
General election 1841: West Kent
Party	Candidate	Votes	%	±%
Conservative	Edmund Filmer	Unopposed		
Conservative	Charles Marsham	Unopposed		
Registered electors		9,089		
Conservative hold				
Conservative gain from Whig				

Marsham succeeded to the peerage, becoming 3rd Earl of Romney and causing a by-election.

By-election, 25 April 1845: West Kent
Party	Candidate	Votes	%	±%
Conservative	Thomas Austen	Unopposed		
Conservative hold				

General election 1847: West Kent
Party	Candidate	Votes	%	±%
Conservative	Edmund Filmer	3,219	34.1	N/A
Whig	Thomas Law Hodges	3,127	33.2	New
Conservative	Thomas Austen	3,082	32.7	N/A
Turnout		6,278 (est)	66.2 (est)	N/A
Registered electors		9,489		
Majority		92	0.9	N/A
Conservative hold		Swing	N/A	
Majority		45	0.5	N/A
Whig gain from Conservative		Swing	N/A	

=== Elections in the 1850s ===
General election 1852: West Kent
Party	Candidate	Votes	%	±%
Conservative	Edmund Filmer	3,247	35.7	+1.6
Conservative	William Masters Smith	3,193	35.1	+2.4
Whig	Thomas Law Hodges	2,652	29.2	−4.0
Majority		595	6.5	+5.6
Majority		541	5.9	N/A
Turnout		5,872 (est)	62.6 (est)	−3.6
Registered electors		9,379		
Conservative hold		Swing	+1.6	
Conservative gain from Whig		Swing	+1.5	

Filmer's death caused a by-election.

By-election, 16 February 1857: West Kent
Party	Candidate	Votes	%	±%
Peelite	Charles Wykeham Martin	3,557	53.0	N/A
Conservative	Sir Walter Buchanan Riddell, 10th Baronet	3,149	47.0	−23.8
Majority		408	6.0	N/A
Turnout		6,706	74.9	+12.3
Registered electors		8,949		
Peelite gain from Conservative		Swing		

General election 1857: West Kent
Party	Candidate	Votes	%	±%
Peelite	Charles Wykeham Martin	3,896	36.6	N/A
Radical	James Whatman	3,578	33.6	+4.4
Conservative	William Masters Smith	3,171	29.8	−41.0
Turnout		5,323 (est)	59.5 (est)	−3.1
Registered electors		8,949		
Majority		725	6.8	N/A
Peelite gain from Conservative		Swing	N/A	
Majority		407	3.8	N/A
Radical gain from Conservative		Swing	+12.5	

General election 1859: West Kent
Party	Candidate	Votes	%	±%
Conservative	William Amherst	3,769	26.0	+11.1
Conservative	Edmund Filmer	3,684	25.4	+10.5
Liberal	Charles Wykeham Martin	3,584	24.7	−11.9
Liberal	James Whatman	3,460	23.9	−9.7
Majority		309	2.1	N/A
Majority		100	0.7	N/A
Turnout		7,249 (est)	81.0 (est)	+21.5
Registered electors		8,949		
Conservative gain from Peelite		Swing	+11.0	
Conservative gain from Liberal		Swing	+10.7	

=== Elections in the 1860s ===
General election 1865: West Kent
Party	Candidate	Votes	%	±%
Conservative	William Amherst	4,133	25.9	−0.1
Conservative	William Hart Dyke	4,054	25.4	0.0
Liberal	John Lubbock	3,896	24.4	−0.3
Liberal	William Angerstein	3,861	24.2	+0.3
Majority		158	1.0	+0.3
Turnout		7,972 (est)	81.3 (est)	+0.3
Registered electors		9,811		
Conservative hold		Swing	−0.1	
Conservative hold		Swing	+0.0	

General election 1868: West Kent
Party	Candidate	Votes	%	±%
Conservative	Charles Mills	3,440	25.8	−0.1
Conservative	John Gilbert Talbot	3,378	25.3	−0.1
Liberal	John Lubbock	3,323	24.9	+0.5
Liberal	William Angerstein	3,196	24.0	−0.2
Majority		55	0.4	−0.6
Turnout		6,669 (est)	75.5 (est)	−5.8
Registered electors		8,828		
Conservative hold		Swing	−0.3	
Conservative hold		Swing	+0.1	

=== Elections in the 1870s ===
General election 1874: West Kent
Party	Candidate	Votes	%	±%
Conservative	Charles Mills	5,295	30.7	+4.9
Conservative	John Gilbert Talbot	5,227	30.3	+5.0
Liberal	Archibald Hamilton	3,391	19.6	−5.3
Liberal	Edward Marjoribanks	3,346	19.4	−4.6
Majority		1,836	10.6	+10.2
Turnout		8,630 (est)	72.1 (est)	−3.4
Registered electors		11,973		
Conservative hold		Swing	+5.1	
Conservative hold		Swing	+4.8	

Talbot resigned in order to contest the 1878 Oxford University by-election.

By-election, 15 May 1878: West Kent
Party	Candidate	Votes	%	±%
Conservative	William Legge	Unopposed		
Conservative hold				

=== Elections in the 1880s ===
General election 1880: West Kent
Party	Candidate	Votes	%	±%
Conservative	Charles Mills	6,413	35.2	+4.5
Conservative	William Legge	5,986	32.8	+2.5
Liberal	Henry Mason Bompas	4,857	26.6	−12.4
Conservative Tenant Farmers	John May	977	5.4	New
Majority		1,129	6.2	−4.4
Turnout		11,270 (est)	75.8 (est)	+3.7
Registered electors		14,873		
Conservative hold		Swing	+5.4	
Conservative hold		Swing	+4.4	

Legge was appointed Vice-Chamberlain of the Household, requiring a by-election.

By-election, 6 Jul 1885: West Kent
Party	Candidate	Votes	%	±%
Conservative	William Legge	Unopposed		
Conservative hold				

== Sources ==
- Leigh Rayment's Historical List of MPs – Constituencies beginning with "K" (part 1)
- Craig, F. W. S. (1989) [1977]. British parliamentary election results 1832–1885 (2nd ed.). Chichester: Parliamentary Research Services. pp. 406–407. ISBN 0-900178-26-4.
