= Filmer baronets =

Title in the Baronetage of England

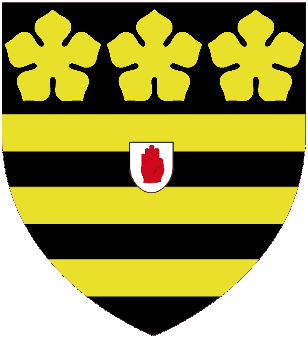
- Escutcheon of the Filmer baronets of East Sutton
- Creation date: 1674
- Status: extinct
- Extinction date: 1916
- Arms: Barry of six Or and Sable on a chief of the last three cinquefoils of the first.
- Crest: On a ruined castle, a falcon volant proper.

The Filmer Baronetcy, of East Sutton in the County of Kent, was a title in the Baronetage of England. It was created on 26 December 1674 for Robert Filmer, of East Sutton Place, East Sutton, Kent. He was the grandson of Sir Edward Filmer, of Little Charleton, High Sheriff of Kent in 1616, who married Elizabeth Argall of East Sutton and purchased the estate there from her brother. His son Sir Robert Filmer, father of the first Baronet, was a supporter of the Crown during the English Civil War. The baronetcy was created for his son, also Robert Filmer, after the Restoration of Charles II in his honour.

The second Baronet was High Sheriff of Kent in 1689. The fourth Baronet was member of parliament for Steyning. The eighth Baronet was member of parliament for West Kent. The ninth Baronet represented West Kent and Mid Kent in Parliament. The title became extinct on the death of the tenth Baronet in 1916.

== Filmer baronets, of East Sutton (1674) ==
- Sir Robert Filmer, 1st Baronet (1622–1676)
- Sir Robert Filmer, 2nd Baronet (1648–1720)
- Sir Edward Filmer, 3rd Baronet (1683–1755)
- Sir John Filmer, 4th Baronet (1716–1797)
- Sir Beversham Filmer, 5th Baronet (1719–1805)
- Sir Edmund Filmer, 6th Baronet (1727–1834)
- Sir John Filmer, 7th Baronet (1760–1834)
- Sir Edmund Filmer, 8th Baronet (1809–1857)
- Sir Edmund Filmer, 9th Baronet (1835–1886)
- Sir Robert Marcus Filmer, 10th Baronet (1878–1916)
