= East Sutton =

Civil parish in Kent, England

Coordinates: 51.21583°N 0.61583°E

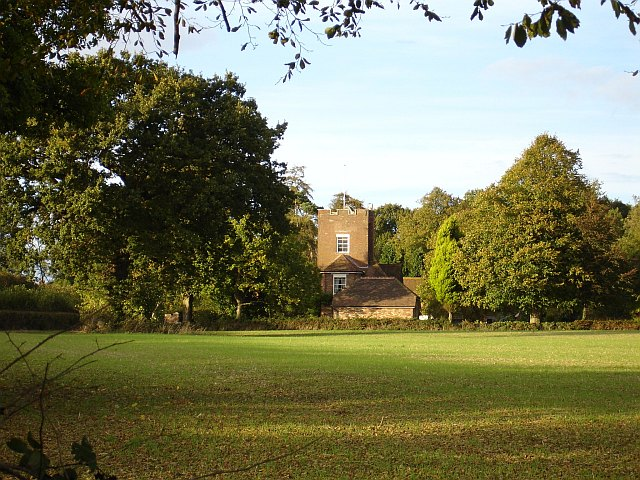
- Pleasure House, the former home of Alice Keppel, mistress of King Edward VII

- Location within Kent
- OS grid reference: TQ827495
- Shire county: Kent
- Region: South East
- Country: England
- Sovereign state: United Kingdom
- Post town: Maidstone
- Postcode district: ME17
- Dialling code: 01622
- Police: Kent
- Fire: Kent
- Ambulance: South East Coast
- UK Parliament: Weald of Kent

East Sutton is a parish approximately 6 miles south-east of Maidstone in Kent, England. East Sutton is small in number of dwellings but relatively large in area: the parish has a women's prison, a council estate of 16 houses and the Grade I listed 13th-century St Peter's and St Paul's Church. The population is included in the civil parish of Sutton Valence.

HMP East Sutton Park opened as a Borstal in 1946, and is now a prison and Young Offenders Institution for females, situated in a manor house, located just outside the village.

King Edward VII used to visit the village for liaisons with his mistress, Alice Keppel at Pleasure House, on the border with Sutton Valence.

== See also ==
- Listed buildings in East Sutton
