= List of MPs for Kent =

This is a list of members of Parliament in Kent, covering each of the seats in the English county, except Kent (to 1832), East Kent (1832–1885), West Kent (1832–1885), and Mid Kent (1868–1885).

== Ashford ==
Ashford constituency

The Ashford constituency was created in 1885.

Election	Member	Party
1885	William Pomfret Pomfret	Conservative
1892	Laurence Hardy	Conservative
1918	Samuel Strang Steel	Coalition Conservative
1929	Rev. Roderick Kedward	Liberal
1931	Michael Knatchbull	Conservative
1933 by-election	Patrick Spens	Conservative
1943 by-election	Edward Percy Smith	Conservative
1950	Bill Deedes	Conservative
1974	Keith Speed	Conservative
1997	Damian Green	Conservative

== Canterbury ==
The Canterbury constituency was created in 1295.

=== MPs 1660–1880 ===
Year	First member	Second member
1660	Sir Anthony Aucher	Heneage Finch,later Earl of Nottingham
1661	Francis Lovelace	Sir Edward Master
1664	Thomas Hardres	Sir Edward Master
Feb 1679	Edward Hales	William Jacob
Aug 1679	Edward Hales	Sir Thomas Hardres
1681	Lewis Watson	Vincent Denne
1685	Sir William Honywood, 2nd Baronet	Henry Lee
1695	Sir William Honywood, 2nd Baronet	George Sayer
1698	Henry Lee	George Sayer
1705	Henry Lee	John Hardres
1708	Edward Watson	Sir Thomas D'Aeth, 1st Baronet
1710	John Hardres	Henry Lee
1715	John Hardres	Sir Thomas Hales, 2nd Baronet
1722	Samuel Milles	Sir Thomas Hales, 2nd Baronet
1727	Sir William Hardres, 4th Baronet	Sir Thomas Hales, 2nd Baronet
1734	Sir William Hardres, 4th Baronet	Thomas May
1735	Sir Thomas Hales, 2nd Baronet	Thomas May
1741	Thomas Watson	Thomas Best
1746	Sir Thomas Hales, 2nd Baronet	Thomas Best
1747	Matthew Robinson-Morris	Thomas Best
1754	Matthew Robinson-Morris	Sir James Creed
1761	Richard Milles	Thomas Best
1768	Richard Milles	William Lynch
1774	Richard Milles	Sir William Mayne,later Baron Newhaven
1780	George Gipps	Charles Robinson
1790	George Gipps	Sir John Honywood, 4th Baronet
1796	John Baker	Samuel Elias Sawbridge
Election declared void 2 Mar 1797
Mar 1797	John Baker	Samuel Elias Sawbridge
May 1797	Sir John Honywood	George Gipps
1800	Sir John Honywood	George Watson
1802	John Baker	George Watson
1806	John Baker	James Simmons
Feb 1807	John Baker	Samuel Elias Sawbridge
May 1807	John Baker	Edward Taylor
1812	John Baker	Stephen Rumbold Lushington
1818	Edward Bligh, Baron Clifton	Stephen Rumbold Lushington
1830	Richard Watson	George Cowper, Viscount Fordwich
Jan 1835	Lord Albert Denison Conyngham	Frederick Villiers
Mar 1835	Lord Albert Denison Conyngham	Stephen Rumbold Lushington
1837	Lord Albert Denison Conyngham	James Bradshaw
1841	George Smythe	James Bradshaw
1847	George Smythe	Lord Albert Denison Conyngham
1850	George Smythe	Frederick Romilly
1852	Henry Plumptre Gipps	Henry Butler-Johnstone
Constituency representation suspended (1853)
1854	Charles Manners Lushington	Sir William Meredyth Somerville
1857	Henry Butler-Johnstone	Sir William Meredyth Somerville
1862	Henry Alexander Munro Butler-Johnstone, Conservative	Sir William Meredyth Somerville
1865	Henry Alexander Munro Butler-Johnstone, Conservative	John Walter Huddleston, Conservative
1868	Henry Alexander Munro Butler-Johnstone, Conservative	Theodore Henry Brinckman, Liberal
1874	Henry Alexander Munro Butler-Johnstone, Conservative	Lewis Ashurst Majendie, Conservative
1878	Alfred Erskine Gathorne-Hardy, Conservative	Lewis Ashurst Majendie, Conservative
1879	Alfred Erskine Gathorne-Hardy, Conservative	Robert Peter Laurie, Conservative
Constituency representation suspended (1880)

=== MPs since 1885 ===
Canterbury constituency

- Constituency representation restored and reduced to one (1885)

Election	Member	Party
1885	John Henniker Heaton	Conservative
December 1910	Francis Bennett-Goldney	Conservative
1918 by-election	George Knox Anderson	Conservative
1918	Ronald McNeill	Conservative
1927 by-election	William Wayland	Conservative
1945	John Baker White	Conservative
1953 by-election	Leslie Thomas	Conservative
1966	David Crouch	Conservative
1987	Julian Brazier	Conservative

Chatham and Aylesford constituency

== Chatham and Aylesford ==
The Chatham and Aylesford constituency was created in 1997

Election	Member	Party
1997	Jonathan Shaw	Labour
2010	Tracey Crouch	Conservative

== Dartford ==
The Dartford constituency was created in 1885

=== MPs 1885–1945 ===
Election	Member	Party
1885	Sir William Hart Dyke	Conservative
1906	James Rowlands	Liberal
1910	William Foot Mitchell	Conservative
1910	James Rowlands	Liberal
1920	John Edmund Mills	Labour
1922	George William Symonds Jarrett	Constitutionalist
1923	John Edmund Mills	Labour
1924	Angus McDonnell	Conservative
1929	John Edmund Mills	Labour
1931	Frank Edward Clarke	Conservative
1938	Jennie Adamson	Labour

=== MPs since 1945 ===
Dartford Constituency

The constituency was split in 1945, with half becoming the new Bexley seat

Election	Member	Party
1945	Norman Dodds	Labour Co-operative
1955	Sydney Irving	Labour Co-operative
1970	Peter Trew	Conservative
1974	Sydney Irving	Labour Co-operative
1979	Bob Dunn	Conservative
1997	Howard Stoate	Labour

== Dover ==
Dover Constituency

Election	Member	Party
1945	John Thomas	Labour
1950	John Arbuthnot	Conservative
1964	David Ennals	Labour
1970	Peter Rees	Conservative
1987	David Shaw	Conservative
1997	Gwyn Prosser	Labour
2010	Charlie Elphicke	Conservative

Faversham and Mid Kent constituency

== Faversham and Mid Kent ==
The Faversham and Mid Kent constituency was created in 1997

Election	Member	Party
1997	Andrew Rowe	Conservative
2001	Hugh Robertson	Conservative

== Folkestone and Hythe ==
Folkestone and Hythe constituency

The Folkestone and Hythe constituency was created in 1950

Election	Member	Party
1950	Harry Ripley Mackeson	Conservative
1959	Sir Albert Costain	Conservative
1983	Michael Howard	Conservative
2010	Damian Collins	Conservative

== Gillingham ==
Gillingham constituency

The Gillingham constituency was created in 1918

Election	Member	Party
1918	Constituency created	
1918	Sir Gerald Fitzroy Hohler	Conservative
1929	Sir Robert Vaughan Gower	Conservative
1945	Joseph Binns	Labour
1950	Sir Frederick Burden	Conservative
1983	James Couchman	Conservative
1997	Paul Clark	Labour
2010	Constituency abolished: see extended constituency of Gillingham and Rainham.	

== Gravesham ==
Gravesham constituency

The Gravesham constituency was created in 1983

Election	Member	Party
1983	Timothy Brinton	Conservative
1987	Jacques Arnold	Conservative
1997	Chris Pond	Labour
2005	Adam Holloway	Conservative

== Maidstone and The Weald ==
The Maidstone and The Weald constituency, originally named "Maidstone", was created in 1560. Up until 1885 it elected two MPs. In 1997 the name was changed to "Maidstone and The Weald".

=== MPs 1660–1885 ===
Year	First member	Second member
1660, April	Thomas Twisden	Robert Barnham
1660, August	Sir Edward Hales	Robert Barnham
1661	Sir Edmund Pierce	Robert Barnham
1668	Thomas Harlackenden	Robert Barnham
1679, February	Sir John Tufton	Sir John Darell
1679, August	Sir John Tufton	Thomas Fane
1685, March	Sir John Tufton	Archibald Clinkard
1685, November	Edwin Wyatt	Archibald Clinkard
1689	Sir Thomas Taylor	Caleb Banks
1690	Sir Thomas Taylor	Thomas Rider
1695	Sir Thomas Taylor	Sir John Banks, 1st Baronet
1696	Thomas Rider	Sir John Banks, 1st Baronet
1698	Sir Robert Marsham	Thomas Bliss
1702	Sir Robert Marsham	Sir Thomas Roberts
1704	Heneage Finch	Thomas Bliss
1705	Sir Thomas Colepeper	Thomas Bliss
1708	Sir Thomas Colepeper	Sir Robert Marsham
1713	Sir Samuel Ongley	Sir Robert Marsham
1715	Sir Thomas Colepeper	Sir Robert Marsham
1716	Sir Thomas Colepeper	Sir Barnham Rider
1722	Sir Thomas Colepeper	John Finch
1723	Sir Barnham Rider	John Finch
1727	Thomas Hope	John Finch
1734	William Horsemonden-Turner	John Finch
1740	Robert Fairfax	
1741	Lord Guernsey	John Bligh
1747	William Horsemonden-Turner	Robert Fairfax
1753	Gabriel Hanger	Robert Fairfax
1754	Gabriel Hanger	Lord Guernsey
1757	Gabriel Hanger	Savile Finch
1761	Rose Fuller	William Northey
1768	Charles Marsham	Robert Gregory
1774	Sir Horatio Mann	Lord Guernsey
1777	Sir Horatio Mann	Charles Finch
1780	Sir Horatio Mann	Clement Taylor
1784	Gerard Edwards	Clement Taylor
1788	Sir Matthew Bloxham	Clement Taylor
1796	Sir Matthew Bloxham	Oliver de Lancey
1802	Sir Matthew Bloxham	John Hodsdon Durand
1806	George Simson	George Longman
1812	George Simson	Samuel Egerton Brydges
1818	Abraham Wildey Robarts	George Longman
1820	Abraham Wildey Robarts	John Wells
1830	Abraham Wildey Robarts	Henry Winchester
1831	Abraham Wildey Robarts	Charles James Barnett
1835	Abraham Wildey Robarts	Wyndham Lewis
1837	Benjamin Disraeli	Wyndham Lewis
1838	Benjamin Disraeli	John Minet Fector
1841	Alexander Beresford-Hope	George Dodd
1852	James Whatman	George Dodd
1853	James Whatman	William Lee
1857	Alexander Beresford-Hope	Edward Scott
1859	William Lee	Charles Buxton
1865	William Lee	James Whatman
1870	Sir John Lubbock	James Whatman
1874	Sir John Lubbock	Sir Sydney Waterlow
1880	Alexander Henry Ross	John Freke-Aylmer
1885	Reduced to one member	

=== MPs 1885–present ===
Maidstone and The Weald constituency

Election	Member	Party
1885	Alexander Henry Ross	
1888 by-election	Fiennes Cornwallis	Conservative
1895	Sir Frederick Hunt	
1898 by-election	Fiennes Cornwallis	Conservative
1900	John Barker	Liberal
1901 by-election	Sir Francis Evans	
1906	Viscount Castlereagh	
1915 by-election	Carlyon Bellairs	Conservative
1931	Sir Alfred Charles Bossom	Conservative
1959	John Wells	Conservative
1987	Ann Widdecombe	Conservative
2010	Helen Grant	Conservative

== Medway ==
The Medway constituency was created in 1885

Medway constituency

Election	Member	Party
1885	John Stewart Gathorne-Hardy	Conservative
1892	Charles Warde	Conservative

The constituency was abolished in 1918 and recreated in 1983

Election	Member	Party
1983	Dame Peggy Fenner	Conservative
1997	Bob Marshall-Andrews	Labour
2010	Constituency abolished: see Rochester and Strood	

North Thanet constituency

== North Thanet ==
The North Thanet constituency was created in 1983

Election	Member	Party
1983	Roger Gale	Conservative

== Sevenoaks ==
Sevenoaks constituency

The Sevenoaks constituency was created in 1885

Election	Member	Party
1885	Charles William Mills	Conservative
1892	Henry William Forster	Conservative
1918	Sir Thomas Jewell Bennett	Coalition Conservative
1923	Ronald Samuel Ainslie Williams	Liberal
1924	Herbert Walter Styles	Conservative
1929	Sir Edward Hilton Young	Conservative
1935	Charles Ponsonby	Conservative
1950	Sir John Rodgers	Conservative
1979	Mark Wolfson	Conservative
1997	Michael Fallon	Conservative

Sittingbourne and Sheppey constituency

== Sittingbourne and Sheppey ==
The Sittingbourne and Sheppey constituency was created in 1997

Election	Member	Party
1997	Derek Wyatt	Labour
2010	Gordon Henderson	Conservative

== South Thanet ==
South Thanet constituency

The South Thanet constituency was created in 1983

Election	Member	Party
1983	Jonathan Aitken	Conservative
1997	Stephen Ladyman	Labour
2010	Laura Sandys	Conservative

== Tonbridge and Malling ==
Tonbridge and Malling constituency

The Tonbridge and Malling constituency was created in 1974

Election	Member	Party
Feb. 1974	Sir John Stanley	Conservative

== Tunbridge Wells ==
Tunbridge Wells constituency

The Tunbridge Wells constituency was created in 1974

Election	Member	Party
Feb. 1974	Patrick Mayhew	Conservative
1997	Archie Norman	Conservative
2005	Greg Clark	Conservative

== See also ==
- List of parliamentary constituencies in Kent
- West Kent (UK Parliament constituency)
- Mid Kent (historic UK Parliament constituency)
- Mid Kent (UK Parliament constituency)
- East Kent (UK Parliament constituency)
