= Sir John Tufton, 2nd Baronet =

English politician

Sir John Tufton, 2nd Baronet (c. 1623 – 11 October 1685) was an English politician who sat in the House of Commons from 1660 to 1685.

Tufton was the eldest surviving son of Sir Humfrey Tufton, 1st Baronet of The Mote, Maidstone, Kent and his wife Margaret Morley, daughter of Herbert Morley of Glynde, Sussex. He matriculated at University College, Oxford on 29 April 1636, aged 13. He was knighted on 21 December 1641. In October 1659 he succeeded to the baronetcy on the death of his father.

In April 1660, Tufton was elected Member of Parliament (MP) for Kent in the Convention Parliament. He was re-elected MP for Kent in 1661 for the Cavalier Parliament. He was elected MP for Maidstone in the two elections of 1679 and in 1681 and 1685.

Tufton married firstly Margaret, daughter of Thomas, 2nd Baron Wotton of Marley. He married secondly before 1657, Mary Altham, daughter of Sir James Altham of Markshall, Latton, Essex. He had no issue and the baronetcy became extinct on his death. Debts compelled the sale of his estate.

Parliament of England
Preceded by Augustine Skinner; One seat vacant	Member of Parliament for Kent; 1660–1679; With: Sir Edward Dering; Sir Thomas Peyton	Succeeded by Sir Vere Fane; Sir Edward Dering
Preceded by Thomas Harlackenden; Robert Barnham	Member of Parliament for Maidstone; 1679–1685; With: John Darell 1679; Thomas Fane 1679–1685; Archibald Clinkard 1685	Succeeded by Archibald Clinkard; Edwin Wyat
Baronetage of England
Preceded by Humfrey Tufton	Baronet (of The Mote); 1659–1685	Extinct
