= George Fane (of Burston) =

English politician

Sir George Fane (1581 – 26 June 1640) was an English politician who sat in the House of Commons at various times between 1601 and 1640.

== Life ==
Fane was the second son of Sir Thomas Fane of Badsell in Kent, by his second wife, Mary Neville, who was a daughter of Henry Nevill, 6th Baron Bergavenny and his wife, the former Lady Frances Manners. Fane was matriculated from Queens' College, Cambridge in 1595 and admitted at Lincoln's Inn on 19 November 1597.

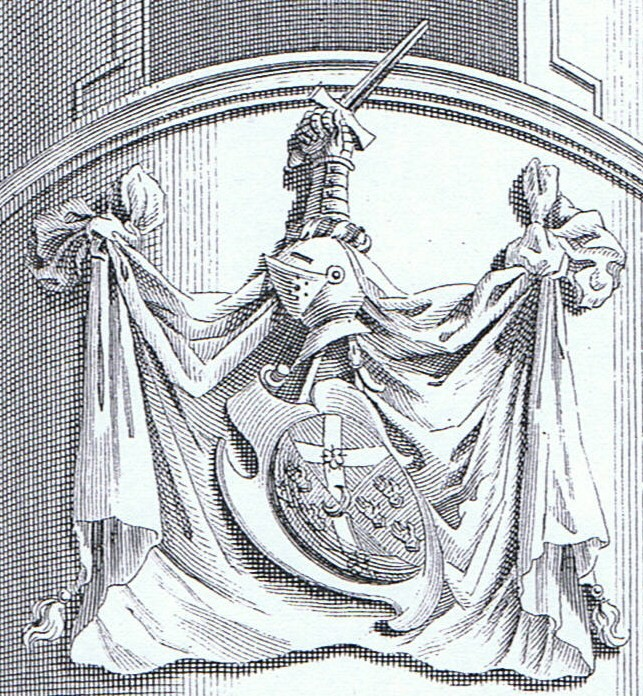
_{Arms of Fane quartering Neville, Barons Bergavenny (Gules, a saltire argent charged with a rose of the field), relating to parentage of George Fane of Burston, younger son of Sir Thomas Fane and Hon. Mary Neville. A crescent is shown as the difference for a second son. Engraving of the tomb of himself and his wife Elizabeth Spencer (d. 1618) in Westminster Abbey}

In 1601, Fane was elected Member of Parliament for Dover. He was knighted on 23 July 1603 at the coronation of King James I. In 1604 he was elected MP for Sandwich and in 1614 was elected MP for Dover again. He was elected MP for Kent in 1621. In 1624 he was elected MP for Maidstone and was elected again in 1626 and 1628 and sat until 1629 when King Charles decided to rule without parliament for eleven years.

In April 1640 Fane was elected again as MP for Maidstone in the Short Parliament.

Fane died at the age of 59. He was not buried with his first wife.

== Personal ==
Fane married firstly Elizabeth Spencer, daughter of Lord Spencer (of Althorp) and his wife Margaret Willoughby on 3 September 1607 but they had no children. Elizabeth died in 1618 and was buried on 19 November 1618 in St Nicholas’ chapel in Westminster Abbey where there is a large and elaborate monument of alabaster and marble. Fane's second wife was Anne Boteler, by whom he had six children.

Parliament of England
Preceded by Thomas Fane; William Leonard	Member of Parliament for Dover; 1601; With: George Newman	Succeeded by Sir Thomas Waller; George Bing
Preceded by Peter Manwood; Edward Peake	Member of Parliament for Sandwich; 1604–1611; With: Edward Peake; John Griffith	Succeeded by Thomas Smythe; Sir Samuel Peyton, 1st Baronet
Preceded by Sir Thomas Waller; George Bing	Member of Parliament for Dover; 1614; With: Robert Brett	Succeeded by Sir Henry Mainwaring; Sir Richard Young
Preceded by Sir Peter Manwood; Sir Thomas Walsingham	Member of Parliament for Kent; 1621–1622; With: Viscount Lisle	Succeeded by Nicholas Tufton; Sir Edwin Sandys
Preceded by Sir Francis Fane; Sir Francis Barnham	Member of Parliament for Maidstone; 1624; With: Thomas Stanley	Succeeded by Edward Mapleton; Thomas Stanley
Preceded by Edward Mapleton	Member of Parliament for Maidstone; 1626–1629; With: Francis Barnham	Parliament suspended until 1640
Vacant Parliament suspended since 1629	Member of Parliament for Maidstone; 1640; With: Francis Barnham	Succeeded by Sir Francis Barnham; Sir Humfrey Tufton
