= Boughton Monchelsea Place =

Grade I listed English country house in the United Kingdom

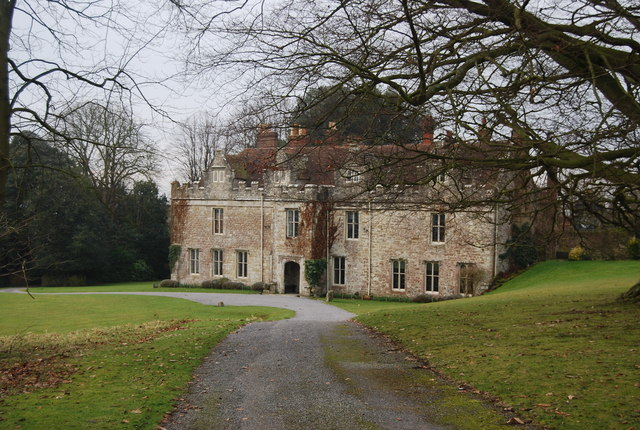
- The east side of Boughton Monchelsea Place

- Location within Kent

General information
- Location: Boughton Monchelsea, England
- Coordinates: 51.221542°N 0.535604°E
- Construction started: c. 1567–75
- Completed: 1819

Boughton Monchelsea Place, previously Boughton Court, is a 16th-century country house in Boughton Monchelsea, Kent, England. The first part of the house was built by Robert Rudston circa 1567–75 on the site of an earlier manor house. It has been modified a number of times during its history achieving its present form in 1819. It has been a home to a number of members of parliament for Maidstone or for Kent, including Sir Francis Barnham (owner 1613–46), Sir Robert Barnham (1646–85) Sir Barnham Rider (1698–1728) and Thomas Rider (1805–47).

The house sits on a south facing slope giving views across the extensive deer park and the Weald beyond. Kitchen gardens to the north of the house remain as remnants of 16th-century formal garden planting. The house is a Grade I listed building and its barn is listed Grade II. The parks and gardens are listed Grade II.

== History ==
Prior to the sixteenth century, the manor of Boughton Monchelsea passed by marriage or sale through the ownership of several families of minor gentry. From 1214, the manor was in the possession of the Hougham family. On the death of Robert de Hougham in 1317, it passed to his daughter Benedicta, wife of John de Shelving. On her death in 1349 without a male heir, the manor was divided between her daughters Helen and Joan.

The portion of the manor of which the Boughton Monchelsea Place estate was part passed to Joan de Shelving's husband John Brampton. The estate then passed to his daughter Benedicta, wife of Thomas Towne, and to her daughter Benedicta, wife of William Watton. Around 1460, Watton sold the estate to Reginald Peckham who recombined the two parts of the manor. On the death of Peckham's grandson Thomas Peckham in 1521, the manor was left to his daughter. Her husband quickly sold the estate to Sir Thomas Wyatt.

His son, Sir Thomas Wyatt the younger, sold the estate to Robert Rudston in 1551. Following Rudston's involvement in Wyatt's rebellion against Mary I, he was fortunate to be reprieved from a death sentence, though his estate was confiscated by the Crown. It was restored to him when Elizabeth I came to the throne in 1558. Rudston had the first parts of the current house built circa 1567–75 as an extension to an earlier house to the west.

Rudston's son Isaac next owned the house. On his death without a son, he left the house to his brother Belknap Rudston, who, on his death in 1613, left it to his grandson Sir Francis Barnham, several times member of parliament for Maidstone. Sir Francis's son Sir Robert Barnham next occupied the house, taking the manor's name as his territorial designation when created a baronet in 1663. Sir Robert served as MP for Maidstone in the Convention Parliament of 1660 and in the Cavalier Parliament from 1661 to 1679. His son Francis predeceased him and, on his death around 1685, the estate was inherited by his daughter Philadelphia Barnham, wife of Thomas Rider. (Note: Hasted indicates that there was a second Sir Robert Barnham (grandson of the first by his son Francis) and that Philadelphia Barnham was the 2nd baronet's daughter rather than the first's. Later sources suggest that there was no second baronet.)

Thomas Rider was MP for Maidstone in 1690 and from 1696 to 1698. He carried out a number of alterations to the house and its grounds between 1685 and 1690. Following his death in 1698, the estate was inherited by his son Sir Barnham Rider, MP for Maidstone from 1722 to 1727, and then his son, Thomas Rider. The second Thomas Rider left the house to his cousin Ingram Rider in 1786. In 1805, Ingram Rider left it to his son Thomas Rider, MP for Kent and West Kent from 1831 to 1835. The third Thomas Rider rebuilt parts of the house and extended and re-landscaped the park. On his death in 1847, he left the house to his nephew, also Thomas Rider, who let the house to a series of tenants.

Robert Cuninghame Taylor was recorded as residing at Boughton Place in 1858. In 1870, his daughter Anne Louisa Taylor married the Rev. John Young Stratton, social reformer and Rector of Ditton.

From 1903 to 1998, the house was occupied by the Winch family, firstly as leaseholders then, from 1960, as freeholders. The Winches sold the house in 1998; it remains in private ownership and belongs to the Kendrick family.

== Buildings ==
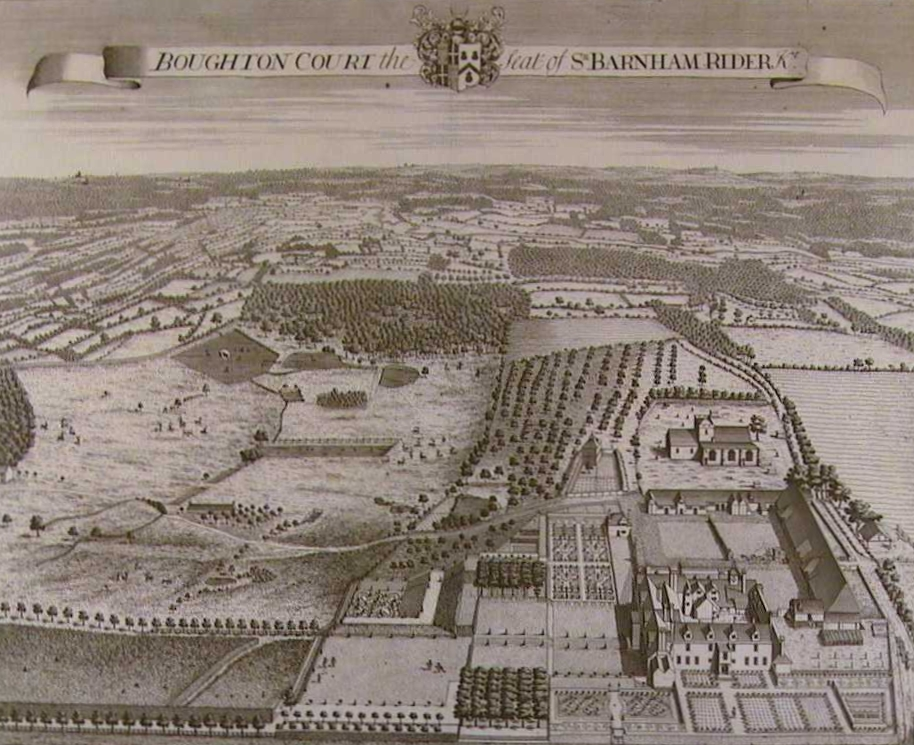
"Boughton Court" by Thomas Badeslade (1719), showing the house with the original north and west wings and formal gardens intact

The two-storey L-shaped main house forms the east and south sides of a courtyard with single-storey stables forming the north and west sides. To the south-west of the house, is a second, larger courtyard flanked on its west side by a large barn and on its north and south by single storey return wings.

The house is the remainder of a former courtyard house built for Robert Rudston circa 1567–75 as an extension to an earlier, pre-16th-century house. It is built of local Kentish ragstone, roughly coursed on the north half of the east range and more regularly coursed on the south half of the east range and on the south range. The centre of the east range features a two-storey porch with galleted stonework on the upper level. The architectural historian John Newman, in his Kent: West and the Weald volume in the Pevsner Buildings of England series, describes it as a "pretty Gothick composition" and dates it to the early 1820s. The roof is of plain clay tiles, stone gabled at the north end of the east range but otherwise hipped, with four stone gabled dormers on the east façade and five smaller ones on the south façade. A frieze band with cornice and moulded stone base runs above the first floor windows on the east façade but is not repeated on the south, where only a moulded string course appears. Battlements were added to the eaves on both façades in 1819 as part of the third Thomas Rider's works.

Windows on the east façade are rectangular with eight windows at ground floor and five at first floor, all with gothic frames. On the south façade, the ground floor windows are taller with a number being two- and three-lighted and stone framed. A chamfered two-storey bay is located slightly to the right of centre. Windows on the first floor are simpler and less tall. The 1819 works also included the demolition and replacement of the north and west ranges and substantial rebuilding of the south range. The north range is built up in red and grey brick from the stone walls of the demolished range. The west range is surmounted by a 17th-century clock turret relocated from the south range when that was rebuilt. The bell is dated 1647.

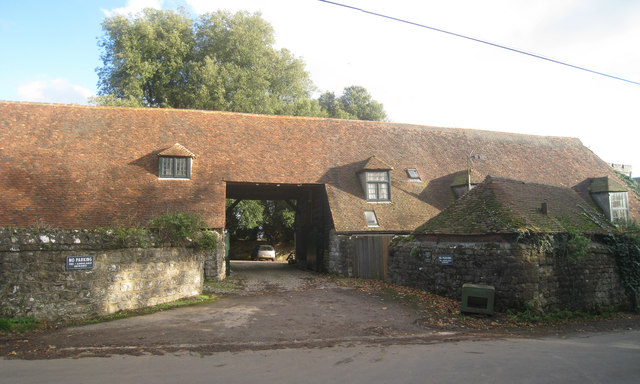
West side of the barn

Internally, the south range includes three 16th- or early-17th-century stone fireplaces that have probably been reused from the earlier house. The north room of the attic floor and principal room on the first floor include 16th- or early-17th-century timber panelling. The room over the entrance hall features late-17th-century panelling. Two period staircases feature; one from each of the 16th and 17th centuries. The windows in the entrance hall and north room of the east range include armorial stained glass windows dated 1567, 1567 and 1575. The stairwell includes windows with 17th-century German stained glass taken from the adjacent church of St Peter and other, undated stained glass.

The timber-framed western barn was constructed in the 15th or early 16th century with an extension or alternations made at the north end in the late 18th or early 19th century. The walls are constructed in a combination of methods – stone walling, weatherboarding or brick infill between timber studs. The steeply pitched plain tiled roof contains six dormers on the west side and one on the east side and is hipped with a gablet to the south end and half-hipped to the north end. A carriage entry passes through the centre of the barn. A single-storey extension runs at a right angle to the south end of the east side, probably built in the 16th century. The two-storey extension to the east side of the north end is lower than the main barn with a half-hipped roof.

The house and courtyard buildings are Grade I listed buildings. The barn is listed Grade II. Within the grounds are a sundial, a mounting block and a stone arch, each Grade II listed.

== Park ==
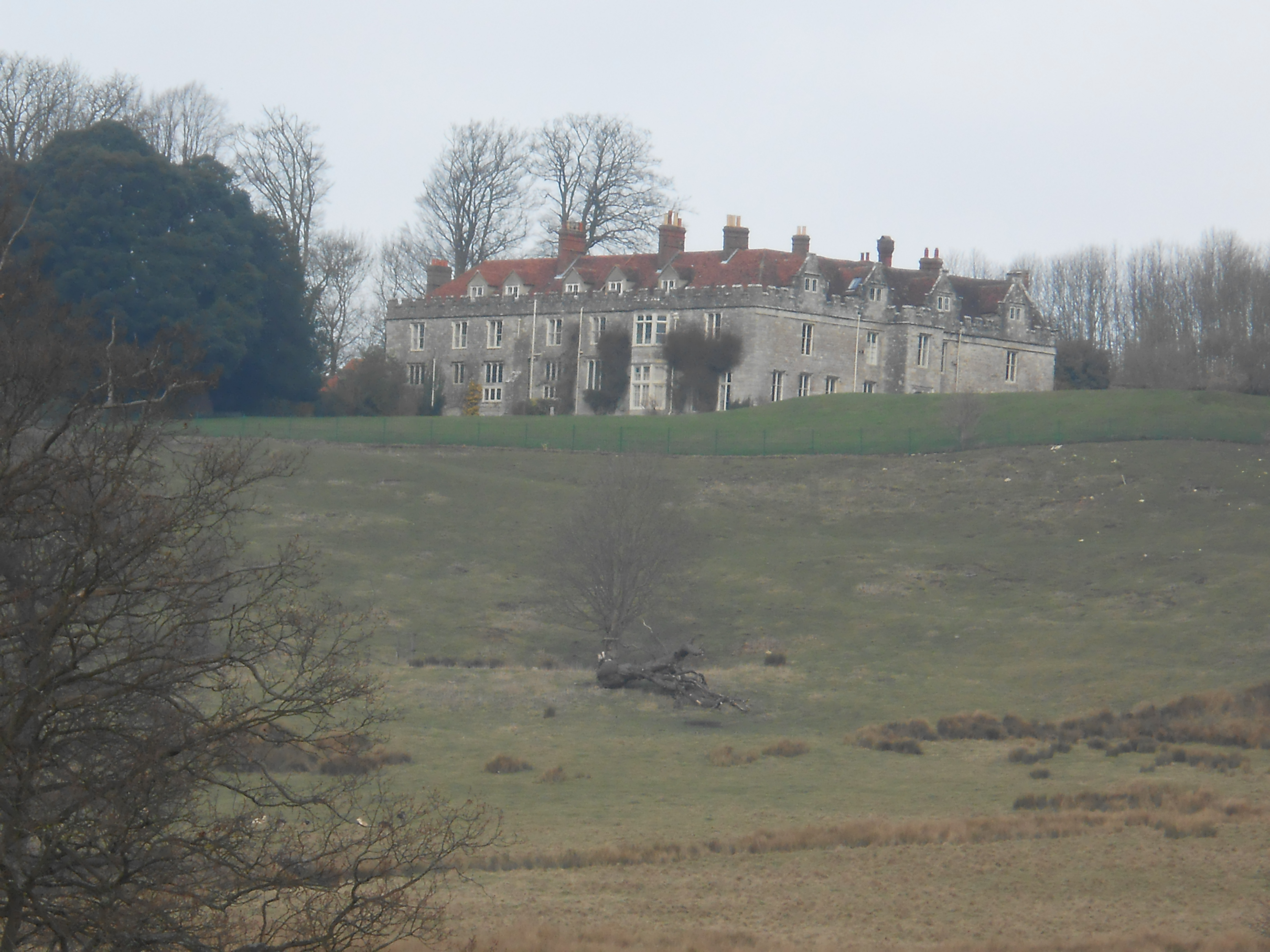
The house seen from the park looking north-west

The house sits in grounds of approximately 40 hectares (99 acres) on a south-facing escarpment giving views south and east across the Weald. The formal entrance is north-west of the house, which is approached through woodland along a drive of approximately 850 metres (930 yd). Immediately to the east and south of the house are open lawns. To the north of the house are three enclosed gardens, two of which are arranged as kitchen gardens. These are remnants of a 16th-century formal garden scheme which was removed and replaced by informal landscaping during the third Thomas Rider's tenure. The steeply sloping ground to the south and south-east of the house is maintained as a deer park with a lake about 400 metres (440 yd) south-east of the house.

The estate is private property and is not usually open to the public, but the Greensand Way long-distance walk crosses the parkland east–west to the north of the house.

== See also ==
- St Peter's Church, Boughton Monchelsea; neighbouring church
- Boughton Place in nearby Boughton Malherbe
- Grade I listed buildings in Maidstone
