= Oliver De Lancey (British Army officer, died 1822) =

British Army general

General Oliver De Lancey
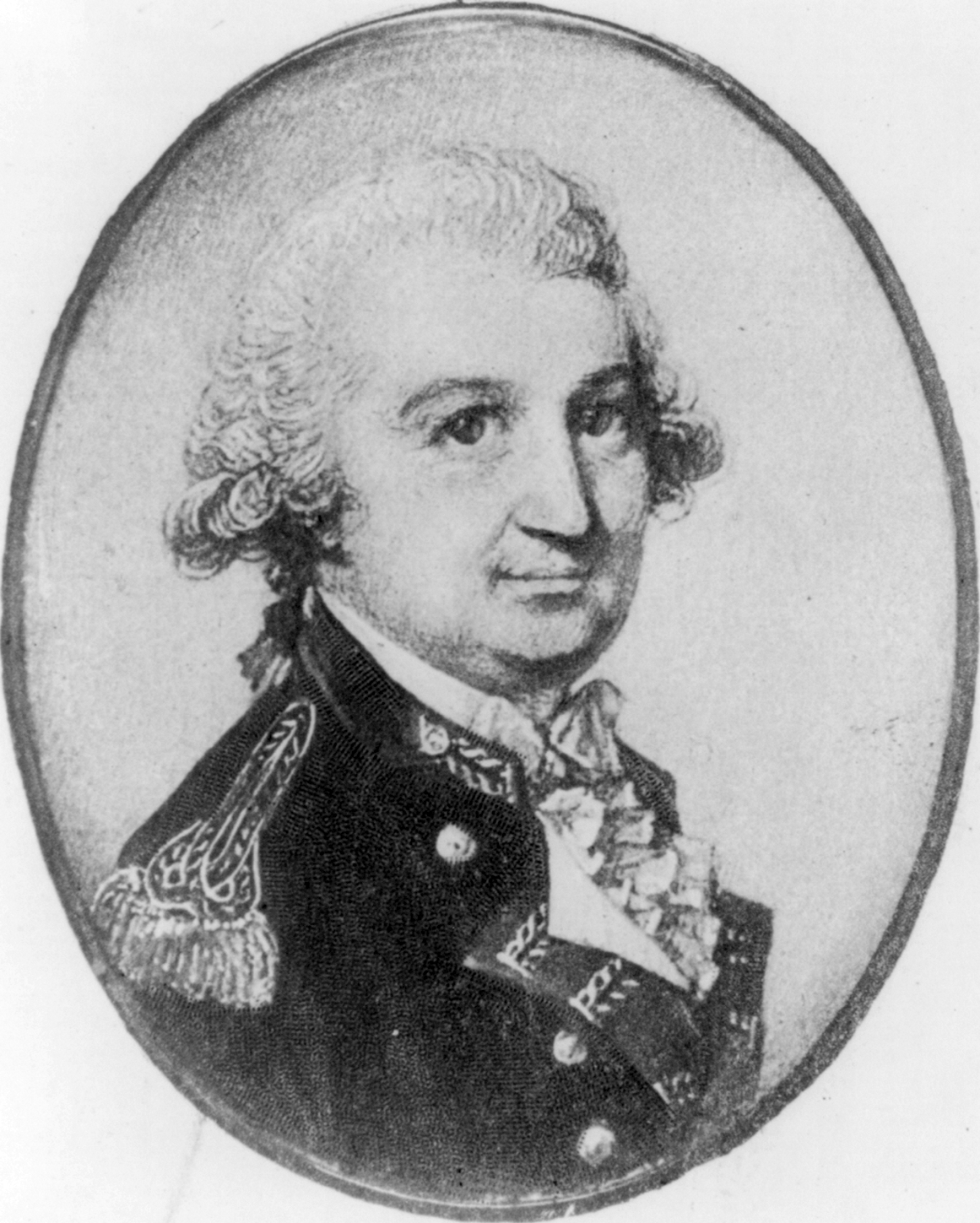
- Born: c. 1753; Province of New York
- Died: 3 September 1822 Edinburgh, Scotland

General Oliver De Lancey (c. 1753 – 3 September 1822), also known as Oliver De Lancey Jr., was a British Army officer of French Huguenot and Ashkenazi Jewish descent, from two prominent families in colonial era New York state. His surname is sometimes written as de Lancey or DeLancey.

== Early life ==
Oliver De Lancey Jr was the son of Major-General Oliver De Lancey (1718–1785) and Phila Franks, the eldest daughter of an early New York Jewish family. His brother was Stephen DeLancey, Chief Justice of the Bahamas and Governor of Tobago. He was the nephew of James De Lancey, a celebrated New York lawyer who was chief-justice of that colony from 1733 to 1760 and lieutenant-governor from 1753 to 1760. The De Lanceys had been established in the British Province of New York by his grandfather, a wealthy Huguenot of Caen in Normandy who had emigrated to America on the revocation of the Edict of Nantes and bought large estates; the family ranked among the wealthiest and most powerful citizens of the colony.

De Lancey was educated in England, and entered the British Army as a cornet in the 14th Dragoons on 1 October 1766, and was promoted lieutenant on 12 December 1770, and captain into the 17th Dragoons on 16 May 1773.

== American Revolutionary War ==
When the American Revolutionary War broke out, in 1775, De Lancey was at once despatched to his native colony to make arrangements for the accommodation and remounting of his own regiment and of the royal artillery, then under orders for active service. He found on his arrival there that his father had warmly espoused the royalist cause, and in the following year the elder Oliver de Lancey raised and equipped at his own expense three battalions of loyalist Americans, which he commanded with the rank of brigadier-general. The younger Oliver de Lancey accompanied his regiment to Nova Scotia, to Staten Island in June 1776, and then on an expedition to Long Island, where he commanded the cavalry outposts in the smart action of 28 August, in which the American General Nathaniel Woodhull surrendered to him. It is agreed that Woodhull was assaulted after he had surrendered and died of his wounds. Some sources accuse De Lancey of encouraging his men to maltreat Woodhull and of using his sabre to wound Woodhull, while some others say that De Lancey tried to prevent the attack.

De Lancey commanded the advance of the right column of the British Army under Sir Henry Clinton and Sir William Erskine at the Battle of Brooklyn, served at the capture of New York and the Battle of White Plains. De Lancey was promoted major in his regiment on 3 July 1778. With this rank he covered the retreat of Knyphausen's column in Clinton's retreat from Philadelphia, and was present at the Battle of Monmouth Court House, and in temporary command of the 17th Dragoons, which was the only cavalry regiment in America, he commanded the outposts in front of the New York lines from the middle of 1778 to the end of 1779.

De Lancey then joined the staff as deputy quartermaster-general to the force sent to South Carolina, and after serving at the capture of Charleston he became aide-de-camp to Lord Cornwallis, and eventually succeeded Major John André as adjutant-general to the army at New York. He was promoted lieutenant-colonel of the 17th Dragoons on 3 October 1781, and retired to England with his father on the conclusion of peace and the recognition of the independence of the United States of America.

== Military career in England ==
King George III appointed De Lancey, on Lord Sydney's recommendation, to settle the military claims of the loyal Americans, and head of a commission for settling all the army accounts connected with the American war; and on 18 November 1790 he was promoted colonel and made deputy adjutant-general at the Horse Guards.

In 1794 he received the post of Barrack-Master-General, with an income of £1,500 a year, and on 20 May 1795 George III gave him the colonelcy of the 17th Dragoons, "spontaneously, to the great surprise of the said De Lancey, and I believe of every other person". On 3 October 1794 he was promoted major-general, and in September 1796 he entered Parliament as M.P. for Maidstone, a seat which he held until June 1802. His only son, Oliver De Lancey, was born in Guernsey in 1803.

On 1 January 1801 he was promoted lieutenant-general, but in November 1804 the commissioners of military inquiry found serious mistakes in his barrack accounts, and defalcations amounting to many thousands of pounds. He was removed from his post as barrack-master-general, but in spite of the violent attacks of the opposition, headed on this question by John Calcraft, he was not prosecuted, and was treated rather as having been culpably careless than actually fraudulent. To raise this money he was forced to sell his estate, but he remained a member of the consolidated board of general officers, and was promoted general on 1 January 1812.

== Retirement and death ==
Oliver De Lancey Jr. eventually retired to Edinburgh, where he died in September 1822 at the age of 69.

== Notes ==
Parliament of Great Britain
Preceded by Clement Taylor; Sir Matthew Bloxham	Member of Parliament for Maidstone; 1796–1800; With: Sir Matthew Bloxham	Succeeded by Parliament of the United Kingdom
Parliament of the United Kingdom
Preceded by Parliament of Great Britain	Member of Parliament for Maidstone; 1801–1802; With: Sir Matthew Bloxham	Succeeded by Sir Matthew Bloxham; John Hodsdon Durand
Military offices
Preceded by The Duke of Newcastle	Colonel of the 17th Regiment of (Light) Dragoons; 1795–1822	Succeeded by Lord Edward Somerset
