= Tufton baronets =

Baronetcy in the Baronetage of the United Kingdom

There have been four baronetcies created for persons with the surname Tufton, two in the Baronetage of England, one in the Baronetage of Ireland and one in the Baronetage of the United Kingdom. One creation is extant as of 2008.

The Tufton Baronetcy, of Hothfield in the County of Kent, was created in the Baronetage of England on 29 June 1611. For more information on this creation, see the Earl of Thanet.

The Tufton Baronetcy, of Vintners in the County of Kent, was created in the Baronetage of Ireland on 18 January 1623 for William Tufton, Governor of Barbados. The title became extinct on the death of the third Baronet in 1664.

The Tufton Baronetcy, of The Mote in the County of Kent, was created in the Baronetage of England on 24 December 1641 for Humfrey Tufton, Member of Parliament for Maidstone. The title became extinct on the death of the second Baronet in 1685.

The Tufton Baronetcy, of Appleby in the County of Westmorland, was created in the Baronetage of the United Kingdom on 16 January 1851. For more information on this creation, which is still extant, see the Baron Hothfield.

== Tufton baronets, of Hothfield (1611) ==
- see the Earl of Thanet

== Tufton baronets, of Vintners (1623) ==
- Sir William Tufton, 1st Baronet (died 1650)
- Sir Benedict Tufton, 2nd Baronet (died c. 1655)
- Sir Charles Tufton, 3rd Baronet (1664)

== Tufton baronets, of The Mote (1641) ==
Escutcheon of the Tufton baronets, of The Mote

- Sir Humfrey Tufton, 1st Baronet (1584–1659)
- Sir John Tufton, 2nd Baronet (1623–1685)

== Tufton baronets, of Appleby (1851) ==
- see the Baron Hothfield

Baronetage of England
Preceded by Spencer baronets	Tufton baronets 29 June 1611	Succeeded by Peyton baronets
