= John Hodsdon Durand =

British politician

John Hods(d)on Durand (1761–1830), of Carshalton, Surrey and West Dean Place, Sussex, was a British politician.

He was a Member (MP) of the Parliament of the United Kingdom for Maidstone 1802 to 1806.

Parliament of the United Kingdom
| Preceded by Sir Matthew Bloxham; Oliver de Lancey | Member of Parliament for Maidstone; 1802 – 1806; With: Sir Matthew Bloxham | Succeeded by George Longman; George Simson |
