= Henry Fisher (MP for Maidstone) =

16th-century English politician

Henry Fisher (fl. 1586) was an English politician. Along with Nicholas Barham, Fisher was one of the first Members of Parliament to represent the borough of Maidstone, which had only recently been chartered. They were part of the 2nd Parliament of Queen Elizabeth I.

In addition to his term in Parliament, he was recorder and town clerk for Maidstone from 1559 until his death in 1584.

He was a member (MP) of the Parliament of England for Maidstone in 1563.
