= William Tufton =

British governor of Barbados

Sir William Tufton, 1st Baronet (1589 – May 1631) was the British governor of Barbados between 21 December 1629 and 16 July 1630.

== Career ==
William Tufton was born in 1589, in Mote, Hothfield, Kent. He was the fifth son of Sir John Tufton, and his second wife, a daughter of Sir Humphrey Browne, a Justice of the Common Pleas. His elder brother, Humphrey was created a baronet in his own right. In 1629, the Earl of Carlisle appointed Sir William Tufton as governor of Barbados, sending him to the island.

In Barbados, Tufton removed Governor freehold, building six parishes and churches of the parishes and creating parish councils to govern them. In addition, he improved some aspects of employment of workers, changing some of the policies of former governor Robert Wheatley. However, the increased attention given to the workers rather than entrepreneurs led to Carlisle and traders replacing him with Henry Hawley, who arrived in Barbados in June 1630.

Under Hawley the entrepreneurs's benefits increased, while the living conditions of the workers declined. In addition, Barbados suffered a severe drought, which restricted the supplies to workers and caused the so-called "hunger period". Tufton accused Hawley of withholding supplies for himself and his governing council, while workers had nothing to eat. Tufton gathered a large number of signatories in support of his claim, but he was not able to convince the board, as this was composed of those who supported Hawley.

Hawley then accused Tufton of treason for presenting his petition, arguing that Tufton had rejected his authority as governor. The Council accepted the indictment and Tufton was executed by shooting in May 1631.

== Personal life ==
He married Anne Cave (died 1649) on 30 January 1621 at Greenwich. They had three sons.

Baronetage of England
New creation	Baronet of Vintners; 1623–1631	Succeeded by Benedict Tufton
