= Egerton Brydges =

English bibliographer and genealogist

Sir Egerton Brydges, Bt
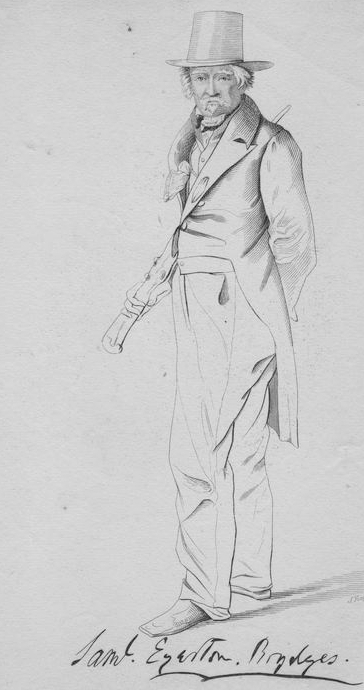
- Born: 30 November 1762; Wootton, Kent
- Died: 8 September 1837 (aged 74); Geneva
- Occupations: bibliographer, genealogist, Member of Parliament for Maidstone from 1812 to 1818

Sir Samuel Egerton Brydges, 1st Baronet (30 November 1762 – 8 September 1837) was an English bibliographer and genealogist. He was also Member of Parliament for Maidstone from 1812 to 1818.

== Life ==
Educated at Maidstone Grammar School and The King's School, Canterbury, Brydges was admitted to Queens' College, Cambridge in 1780, though he did not take a degree. He was called to the bar from the Middle Temple in 1787. He wrote some novels and poems, now forgotten, but rendered valuable service through his bibliographical publications (printed at the Lee Priory Press), Censura Literaria, Titles and Opinions of Old English Books (10 vols. 1805–9), his editions of Edward Phillips's Theatrum Poetarum Anglicanorum (1800), Arthur Collins's Peerage of England (1812), and of many rare Elizabethan authors. He was a founding member of the Roxburghe Club, a publishing club of wealthy bibliophiles. He was elected a Knight Grand Commander of the Equestrian, Secular, and Chapterial Order of St. Joachim in 1807, at a chapter held in Franconia.

In 1789, the Chandos barony became dormant. Egerton Brydges attempted to claim the title, initially on behalf of his older brother Rev. Edward Tymewell Brydges, then later on his own behalf. The litigation continued from 1790 to 1803, before the claims were ultimately rejected, but he continued to style himself "per legem terrae Baron Chandos of Sudeley". It seems likely that not only was the claim groundless but that the evidence was forged.

He was made a baronet on 27 December 1814. In 1824, he started The Literary Magnet as a weekly magazine with his son Egerton Anthony Brydges under the joint pseudonym Tobias Merton (perhaps an anagram of their names). (Note: Professor Ted Ellis suggests that "Tobias Merton, Gent." (as printed on the magazine title page) is an anagram formed from "SAM EGERTON TONI(Y) B[RYDGES], T[RINITY]".) He continued editing it until around August 1824, when it was passed to another editor. He died in Geneva.

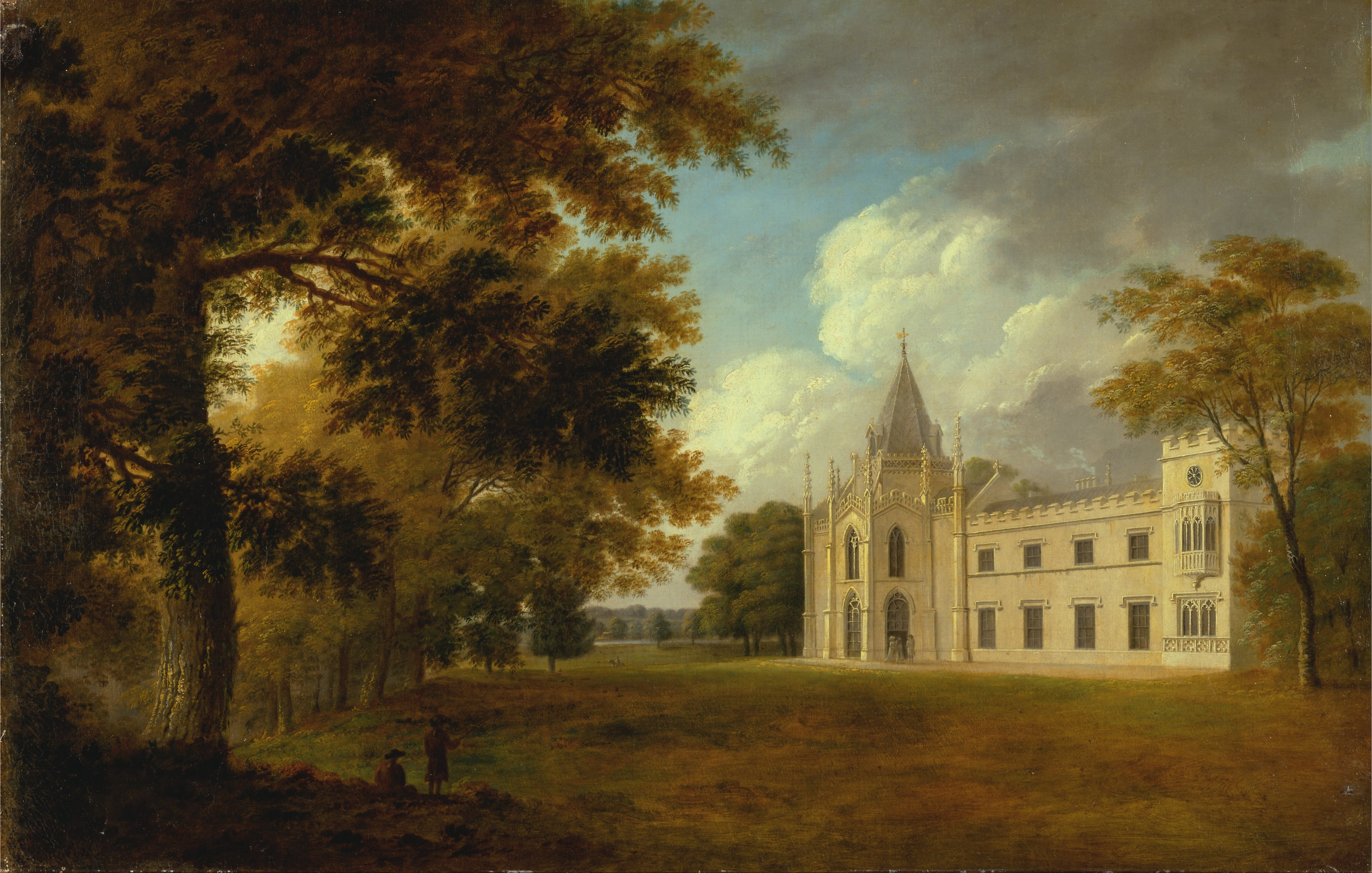
Lee Priory; painted by John Dixon

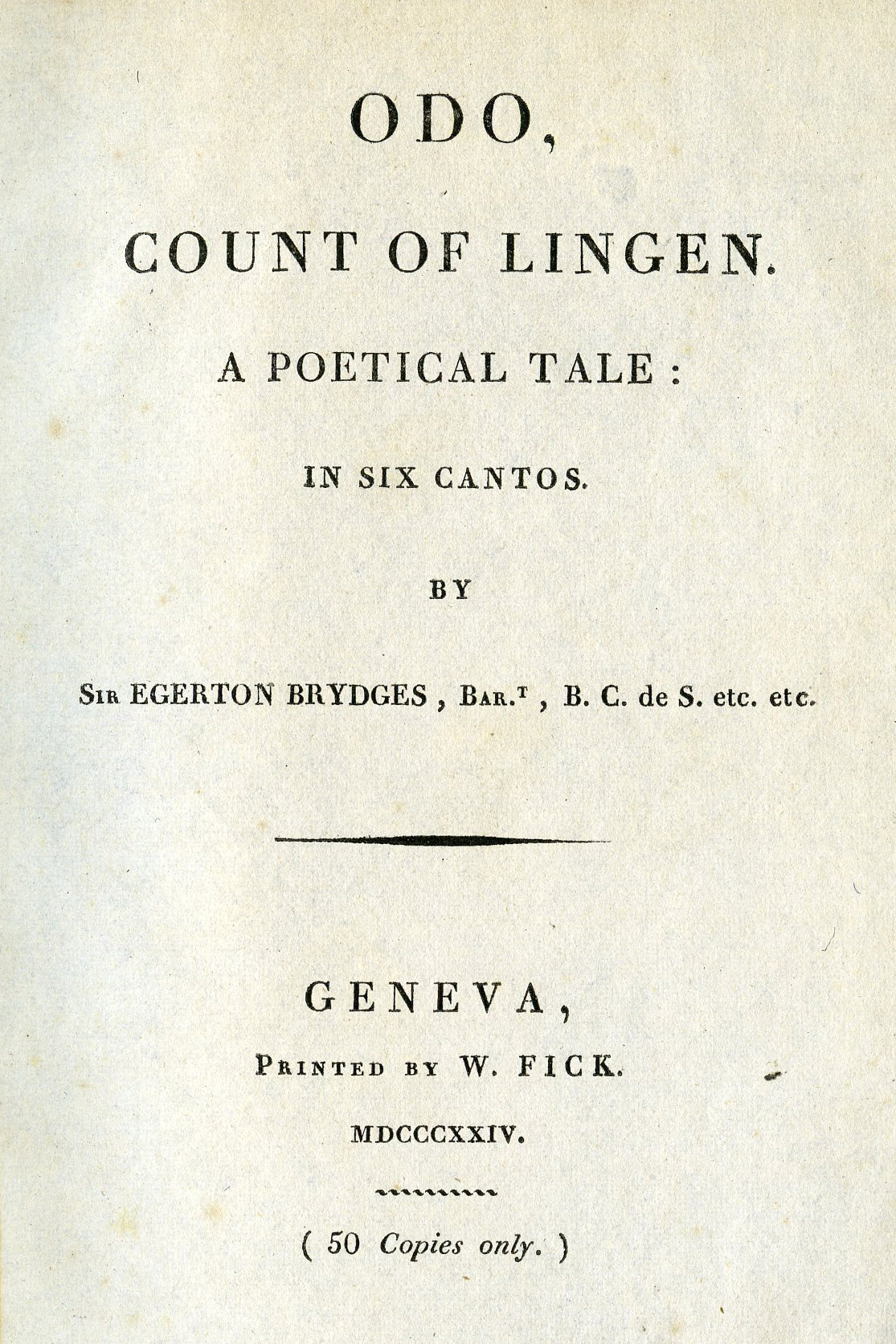

== Some works ==
- What are riches? or An examination of the definitions of this subject given by modern economists, Geneva, print. by William Fick, 1821
- Pierio Valeriano Bolzani, De litteratorum infelicitate, libri duo, editio nova curante Dom. Egerton Brydges, Bar.^{t}, Geneva, Typis Gul. Fick, 1821 (87 copies)
- Res literariæ: Bibliographical and critical for October 1820, Naples, print. by Charles-Antoine Béranger, 1821 (75 copies)
  - Id., for January 1821, Rome, print. by François Bourlié, 1821
  - Id., may 1821 to February 1822, Geneva, print. by W. Fick, 1822, (75 copies)
- The anti-critic for August 1821, and march, 1822 containing literary, not political, criticisms, and opinions, Geneva, print. by W. Fick, 1822 (75 copies)
- Polyanthea librorum vetustiorum, italicorum, gallicorum, hispanicorum, et latinorum, Geneva, Typis G. Fick, 1822 (75 copies)
- Poemata selecta latina mediæ et infimæ ætatis, Gebenis, Typis Guill. Fick, 1822 (37 copies)
- Cimelia seu Examen criticum librorum, ex diariis literariis linguâ præcipue gallicâ ab anno 1665 usque ad annum 1792 scriptis, selectum, Geneva, ex Typis G. Fick, 1823 (75 copies)
- Mémoire sur les lois de la pairie d'Angleterre, Geneva, G. Fick, 1823
- Peerage-law or An inquiry into the laws which protect the hereditament of peerage, to which are added fragments of paper relative to a particular case, Geneva, print. by W. Fick, 1823
- Odo, count of Lingen : a poetical tale in six cantos, Geneva, print. by W. Fick, 1824 (50 copies)
- Gnomica : detached thoughts, sententious, axiomatic, moral and critical, but especially with reference to poetical faculties and habits, Geneva, print. by W. Fick, (75 copies)
- Catalogus librorum rariorum de quibus fit mentio in operibus quorum tituli sunt Cimelia, 1823, Res literariæ 1820, 1821, et Polyanthea, 1822, Geneva, Impr. Fick, 1824 (200 copies)
- Lex terræ : a discussion of the law of England, regarding claims of inheritable rights of peerage, Geneva, W. Fick, 1831 (100 copies)
- Veridica. No. 1 (1 Jan. 1832) – no. 2 (14 jan. 1832), Geneva, W. Fick

== Notes ==
Parliament of England
Preceded by George Longman; George Simson	Member of Parliament for Maidstone; 1812 – 1818; With: George Simson	Succeeded by George Longman; Abraham Wildey Robarts
Baronetage of the United Kingdom
New creation	Baronet (of Denton Court); 1814 – 1837	Succeeded by John William Egerton-Barrett-Brydges
