= John Wells (British politician, born 1761) =

English Tory politician

John Wells (1761 – 22 November 1848) was an English Tory politician who sat in the House of Commons from 1820 to 1830.

He was born in West Malling, Kent, the second son of William Wells, of Bickley Hall, Bromley in Kent and Holme Hall, Huntingdonshire, by his wife Elizabeth, sister of Sir Richard Neave, 1st Baronet, Governor of the Bank of England.

In 1796, he married Esther in Rochester; she was the daughter of John Puget, a London banker, by his wife, Esther, daughter of James Dunn, MP for Dublin from 1758 to 1762. Esther's siblings included John David Puget, of Pointer's Grove, near Totteridge, Hertfordshire, Director of the Bank of England, and Rear-Admiral Peter Puget, CB, who explored with Captain George Vancouver and after whom Puget Sound is named.

The family lived at Bickley Hall, built for his uncle John Wells by Robert Mylne in 1780, and extended to a design by Sir Robert Smirke in 1810.

He also owned the Malling Heath estate in Kent. He was among the leading shipbuilders on the River Thames, a partner in yards at Deptford, Rotherhithe and Blackwall. He served as High Sheriff of Kent for 1812, and then stood unsuccessfully for parliament at Maidstone in 1818.

He was elected as the Tory Member of Parliament (MP) for Maidstone at the general election in March 1820, and held the seat until 1830; he did not stand again for Maidstone.

Wells was a strong opponent of the Catholic Emancipation Bill in 1828, declaring that he would fight to defend the Protestant Constitution "until he was up to his knees in blood". He increasingly moved towards the Whigs and was said to be very much his own man.

Wells died two weeks after his wife when he was aged 87. They had three sons and five daughters, of whom one son and three daughters predeceased him. His daughter Eleanor married James Browne, MP for County Mayo 1818–31, and his daughter Elizabeth married Sir Percyval Hart Dyke, 6th Bt. His great-great-great-nephew, Sir John Wells, was MP for Maidstone 1959–87.

Parliament of the United Kingdom
Preceded by George Longman; Abraham Robarts	Member of Parliament for Maidstone; 1820 – 1830; With: Abraham Robarts	Succeeded by Henry Winchester; Abraham Robarts
