= Clement Taylor =

English paper-maker and politician

Clement Taylor (c. 1745 – April 1804), of Tovil House, Maidstone, Kent, was an English paper-maker and politician who sat in the House of Commons from 1780 to 1796.

Taylor was the son of Clement Taylor, a paper-maker of Wrotham, Kent and his wife Sarah Quelch, daughter of William Quelch, paper-maker, of Dartford. He followed his father into the paper-making business, with large scale manufacture at mills at Tovil, near Maidstone.

Taylor was returned as Member of Parliament for Maidstone after a contest at the 1780 general election. He was returned as an Independent but became a member of the Whig club in 1784. He succeeded in contests again in 1784 and 1790. Towards the end of this Parliament, he was running into difficulties in his business and decided not to stand in the 1796 general election.

In 1793 Taylor set up a paper-making partnership in Ireland which was unsuccessful. He went bankrupt in 1797, and died unmarried in Dublin in April 1804.

Parliament of Great Britain
Preceded by Sir Horatio Mann; Hon. Charles Finch	Member of Parliament for Maidstone; 1780–1796; With: Sir Horatio Mann 1780-1784; Gerard Noel Edwards 1784-1788; Sir Matthew Bloxham 1788-1796	Succeeded by Sir Matthew Bloxham; Major General Oliver de Lancey
