= Laurence Washington (MP for Maidstone) =

English politician

Laurence Washington (c. 1546 – 1619), of Chancery Lane, London and Maidstone, Kent, was an English politician.

Washington was a Registrar of Chancery from 1593 until his death, and a Member (MP) of the Parliament of England for Maidstone in 1604.

His son, also Laurence, bought Garsdon manor in Wiltshire in 1631, and his grandson, again Laurence (1622–1662) sat as MP for Malmesbury in 1661.
