= Barnham Rider =

Sir Barnham Rider (c. 1683 – 21 November 1728), of Boughton Monchelsea Place, Kent, was an English politician who sat in the House of Commons from 1716 to 1727.

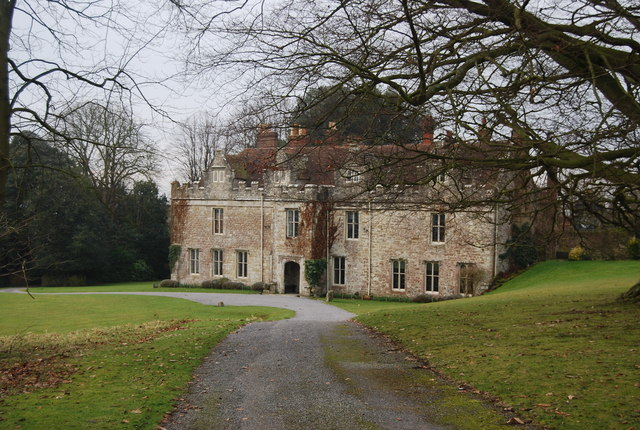
Boughton Monchelsea Place, Kent

Rider was the son of Thomas Rider of Covent Garden and his wife Philadelphia Barnham, youngest daughter of Sir Robert Barnham, 1st Baronet of Boughton Monchelsea Place, Kent. His mother brought Boughton Monchelsea Place into the family. He was admitted at the Middle Temple in 1697 and matriculated at St John's College, Oxford on 16 November 1703, aged 20. In 1704, he succeeded to the estates of his father. He was knighted on 20 October 1714. He married Susan Littleton, the daughter of Vice-Admiral James Littleton of North Ockendon, Essex on around 29 November 1717.

Rider was elected Member of Parliament (MP) for Maidstone, Kent at a contested by-election on 30 June 1716. He voted generally with the Administration, although he opposed the Peerage Bill. He lost his seat at the 1722 general election but was re-elected for Maidstone at a by-election on 1 June 1723. He lost his seat again at the 1727 general election. He petitioned but died before his petition was dealt with.

Rider died on 21 November 1728 leaving two sons and two daughters. He was succeeded by his son, Sir Thomas Rider.

Parliament of Great Britain
Preceded by Robert Marsham; Sir Thomas Culpeper, Bt	Member of Parliament for Maidstone; 1716–1722; With: Sir Thomas Culpeper, Bt	Succeeded by John Finch; Sir Thomas Culpeper, Bt
Preceded by Sir Thomas Culpeper, Bt; Hon. John Finch	Member of Parliament for Maidstone; 1723–1727; With: Hon. John Finch	Succeeded by Thomas Hope; Hon. John Finch
