= Francis Barnham =

English politician

Sir Francis Barnham (1576–1646) was an English politician who sat in the House of Commons at various times between 1604 and 1646. He supported the Parliamentary cause in the English Civil War.

== Life ==
Barham was the eldest son of Martin Barnham, of London and Hollingbourne, Kent and his second wife, Judith Calthorpe, daughter of Sir Martin Calthorpe of London, and was a nephew of Benedict Barnham. He was baptised at Hollingbourne on 20 October 1576. His father was sheriff of Kent in 1598.

Barnham matriculated from Trinity College, Cambridge in 1592, and was admitted at Gray's Inn on 8 November 1594. He was knighted in 1603 at Whitehall Palace on James I's accession shortly after his father. In 1604, he was elected Member of Parliament (MP) for Grampound. In 1613 he inherited from Belknap Rudston, the brother of his father's first wife, the estate of Boughton Monchelsea. He was elected MP for Grampound in 1614. With his father-in-law, Sampson Lennard, an antiquary of some eminence, he was nominated a member of the Academy of Literature projected with the approval of the court in 1617, but subsequently abandoned. In 1621 Barnham was elected MP for Maidstone. He was elected MP for Maidstone again in 1626 and sat until 1629 when King Charles decided to rule without parliament for eleven years. He was Colonel of the Aylesford Lathe Trained Band at the time of the First Bishops' War in 1639.

In April 1640, Barnham was elected MP for Maidstone in the Short Parliament. He was re-elected MP for Maidstone in the Long Parliament in November 1640. He supported the parliamentarians during the First English Civil War. He died in 1646 as a new writ for Maidstone was issued, to fill a vacancy stated to be caused by Sir Francis's death, but in Sir Roger Twysden's diary he is mentioned in 1649 as urging the release of his eldest son Robert, imprisoned by the Kentish committee.

Twysden described him as "a right honest gentleman." Sir Henry Wotton spoke of him as one of his "chiefest friends" and a man "of singular conversation".

== Family ==
Barnham married Elizabeth Lennard, daughter of Sampson Lennard, of Chevening, Kent, and was the father of fifteen children, of whom the fifth son, William, was mayor of Norwich in 1652, and died in 1676. His eldest son Robert received a baronetcy in 1663. According to Colket, Meredith B., Jr.'s Founders of Early American Families: Emigrants from Europe 1607-1657. Cleveland: General Court of the Order of Founders and Patriots of America, 1975, Thomas Barnham (b.1625) a son of Francis, arrived in Fairfield, Connecticut, in 1655. However, a detailed study performed in 2014 by genealogists on the staff of the College of Arms in London, England concluded that the connection between Thomas and Sir Francis is contrary to the known facts. Thomas Barnham/Barnam/Barnum certainly might have descended from a line of the Barnham family but Sir Francis almost certainly was not his father. However, DNA results presently underway, may prove the connection.

Parliament of England
Preceded by John Gray; John Astell	Member of Parliament for Grampound; 1604–1614; With: William Noy; Thomas St Aubyn	Succeeded by John Hampden; Robert Carey
Preceded by Francis Fane; Lawrence Washington	Member of Parliament for Maidstone; 1621–1621; With: Francis Fane	Succeeded by Sir George Fane; Thomas Stanley
Preceded by Edward Mapleton; Thomas Stanley	Member of Parliament for Maidstone; 1626–1629; With: Sir George Fane	Parliament suspended until 1640
Vacant Parliament suspended since 1629	Member of Parliament for Maidstone; 1640–1646; With: Sir George Fane 1640; Sir Humfrey Tufton, 1st Baronet 1640–1646	Succeeded by Sir Humfrey Tufton, 1st Baronet; Sir Thomas Twisden, 1st Baronet
