= Nicholas St. Leger =

16th-century English politician

Nicholas St. Leger or Sellenger (died c. 1589) was an English politician.

He was the third son of Sir Anthony St. Leger and Agnes Warham.

He married Catherine Moyle (1529 - 9 Feb 1586/7) who was the daughter and coheir of Sir Thomas Moyle of Eastwell Park. She had first married Sir Thomas Finch (d.1563) and then married St Leger as her second husband.

St Leger was a Member (MP) of the Parliament of England for Maidstone in 1571 and 1572. He served on the House of Commons Committees for the Bill against Fugitives in 1571 and the Bill against Conveyences in 1580.
