= 1915 Maidstone by-election =

UK Parliamentary by-election

The 1915 Maidstone by-election was held on 22 February 1915. The by-election was held due to the incumbent Conservative MP, Charles Vane-Tempest-Stewart's, succession as seventh Marquess of Londonderry. It was won by the Conservative candidate Carlyon Bellairs who was unopposed due to a War-time electoral pact.
