= 1901 Maidstone by-election =

UK parliamentary by-election

- 1 March 1901

Candidate	Evans	Milvain
Party	Liberal	Conservative
Popular vote	2,375	2,182
Percentage	52.1%	47.9%
MP before election
Sir John Barker
Liberal
Subsequent MP
Sir Francis Evans
Liberal

The 1901 Maidstone by-election was a by-election held in England on 1 March 1901 for the UK House of Commons constituency of Maidstone in Kent.

== Vacancy ==
John Barker

The by-election was caused by the declaration that the result of the contest in Maidstone at the general election of 1900 was void. This decision was made by Mr Justice Kennedy and Mr Justice Channel sitting at the sessions house in Maidstone on hearing an election petition from the defeated Conservative candidate, Fiennes Cornwallis who was Member of Parliament (MP) for Maidstone from 1885 to 1895 and then again from 1898 to 1900. The judges held that there was evidence of bribery of electors by agents acting for Sir John Barker, the Liberal candidate who had won the seat from Cornwallis by 38 votes.

== Candidates ==
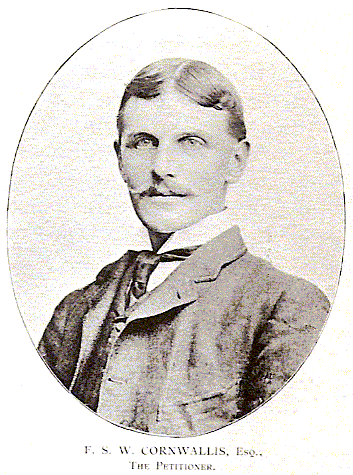
Cornwallis

On 15 February, the Liberals selected as their candidate Sir Francis Evans. Evans had been Liberal MP for Southampton from 1888 to 1892 and 1896–1900. He was 60 years old and had made his career in banking before entering Parliament. He also had substantial interests in the insurance and transport industries.

The Conservatives first hoped that Cornwallis might be persuaded to stand again, but he did not wish to put his name forward and they chose instead Sir Thomas Milvain, KC, the former MP for Durham and a barrister, having been called to the bar at the Middle Temple in 1869.

== Result ==
The result was a win for Evans, returning him to Parliament.

Maidstone by-election, 1901
Party	Candidate	Votes	%	±%
Liberal	Francis Evans	2,375	52.1	+1.7
Conservative	Thomas Milvain	2,182	47.9	−1.7
Majority		193	4.2	+3.4
Turnout		4,557	88.1	+2.0
Liberal hold		Swing	+1.7	

The Liberal majority was increased from 38 votes to 193, despite the disgrace attaching to the election petition. The unseated Barker had also helped Evans in the campaign, so it was difficult to discern any political advantage accruing to the Conservative Party as a result of the court case. One local historian has described the result of the Maidstone by-election as a harbinger of change.

== Aftermath ==
The Conservative Party became increasingly divided over the issue of tariff reform and the Liberals gained heart from the decline of the government over the coming years. At the 1906 general election, the Liberals gained a national landslide. Evans held the seat until 1906 when he was defeated by Lord Castlereagh. Although Maidstone reverted to its traditional Tory roots against the national trend, the Liberals gained three other Kent seats, one fell to a Lib-Lab candidate and one fell to Labour thanks to the pact it had concluded with the Liberals in 1903.
