= Nicholas Barham =

English lawyer and politician

Nicholas Barham (died 1577) was an English lawyer and Member of Parliament.

== Early life ==
Barham was a native of Wadhurst, Sussex, where his family had been settled there for some generations as yeoman farmers and ironmasters. Nicholas Barham was called to the bar at Gray's Inn in 1542, became an 'ancient' of that society 24 May 1552, Lent reader in 1558, and was made serjeant-at-law in 1567, having previously (1562–3) been returned to parliament as member for Maidstone, of which town he also appears to have been recorder.

== Treason trials ==
William Dugdale does not place Barham in the list of queen's serjeants until 1573. He is, however, so designated in papers relating to the trial of Thomas Howard, 4th Duke of Norfolk, for high treason in conspiring with Mary, Queen of Scots to depose Elizabeth, in 1571–2. He was given the conduct of the prosecution. From a letter from Sir Thomas Smith to Lord Burghley it appears that the rack was employed on a witness Banister, one of the duke's agents. When the duke, after the confession of the witness had been read, remarked that 'Banister was shrewdly cramped when he told that tale,’ Barham, who had been present at the examination, replied 'No more than you were.' The trial of the duke took place in Westminster Hall 16 January 1572.

In the following February Barham was engaged in prosecuting the duke's secretary, Robert Higford, at the Court of Queen's Bench, on the charge of adhering to and comforting the queen's enemies. Higford was found guilty and, like his master, condemned to death.

== Death ==
In 1577 Barham was present at the Oxford assizes during the prosecution of a malcontent bookbinder, Rowland Jencks, a Roman Catholic. Jencks had spoken badly of dignities and kept away from church; the university authorities had him arrested and sent to London to undergo examination, and he was returned to Oxford to stand trial. This took place on 4 July, when he was sentenced to lose his ears. There was a sudden outbreak of gaol fever; if the account of Anthony Wood is to be credited, besides Barham and Sir Robert Bell, baron of the exchequer, the high sheriff and his deputy, Sir William Babington, four justices of the peace, three gentlemen, and most of the jury died; and in the course of the next five weeks more than five hundred others.

== Family ==
Barham was survived by his wife, Mary, daughter of John Holt, of Cheshire, and one son, Arthur. He was the owner of two estates, one of which, known as Bigons or Digons, he had acquired by grant from the crown in 1554, the former proprietor having been implicated in the insurrection of Sir Thomas Wyatt; the other, the manor of Chillington, he purchased about the same time. Both estates were sold by his son Arthur. The Sussex branch of the family was largely concerned in the business of ironfounding, of which during the sixteenth and seventeenth centuries the county was a centre, before it declined there.
