= Edmund Peirce =

English lawyer and politician

Sir Edmund Peirce or Pierse (died 10 August 1667), of Greenwich, Kent and Holborn, Middlesex, was an English lawyer and politician.

He was educated at Corpus Christi College, Cambridge (1629) and Trinity Hall, Cambridge (1633). He became an advocate at Doctors' Commons from 1640 to 1646 and from 1661 to his death and entered the Middle Temple in 1641. He was Proctor at the Court of Arches from 1639 and a Master of Requests from 1644 to 1646.

An avid Royalist, he was an officer in the Royal Life Guards in 1642 and a colonel of horse between 1643 and 1648. After the Restoration in 1660 he was rewarded by being appointed a master in Chancery, an Admiralty judge for the Cinque Ports and Chancellor for the diocese of Wells, all from 1660 to his death.

He was a Member (MP) of the Parliament of England for Maidstone from 1661 to 1667.

He died intestate in 1667 and was buried at the Temple church. He was married and had a son and a daughter.
