= John Wells (British politician, born 1925) =

British Conservative politician

Sir John Wells DL

Member of Parliament for Maidstone
- In office 8 October 1959 – 18 May 1987
- Preceded by: Alfred Bossom
- Succeeded by: Ann Widdecombe

Personal details
- Born: John Julius Wells; 30 March 1925
- Died: 8 February 2017 (aged 91)
- Party: Conservative
- Spouse: Lucinda Meath Baker (m. 1948; died 2013)
- Children: 4
- Education: Eton College
- Alma mater: Corpus Christi College, Oxford (MA)

Sir John Julius Wells DL (30 March 1925 – 8 February 2017) was a British Conservative politician.

== Life before politics ==
Wells was educated at Eton College and Corpus Christi College, Oxford (MA). He served in the Royal Naval Volunteer Reserve during the Second World War, as a seaman in 1942, commissioned in 1943 and in submarines until 1946. He was a marine engineer, company director and farmer, and was a councillor on Leamington Spa Borough Council.

== Political career ==
At the 1955 general election, Wells stood unsuccessfully in the Smethwick constituency. At the 1959 general election, he was elected as the Member of Parliament (MP) for Maidstone, following in the footsteps of a 19th-century ancestor, also John Wells. He held the safe Conservative seat until his retirement at the 1987 general election, when his successor was the future minister Ann Widdecombe.

Throughout his period as a Member of Parliament, Wells was a strong supporter of country interests and the local economy, on one occasion riding his horse through the streets of Westminster and on another loudly eating a Kentish apple during a speech by a Labour Minister of Agriculture, as a protest against the import of cheap, subsidised and, in his opinion, inferior imports from France. He was appointed to the speaker's panel of chairmen in 1974, becoming senior Chairman of Standing Committees in 1983 until his retirement. He became chairman of the Horticultural Sub-Committee of the Select Committee on Agriculture in 1968 and was Master of the Worshipful Company of Fruiterers in 1977. He was made a Knight Bachelor in 1984 and appointed a Deputy Lieutenant of Kent in 1992.

== Personal life ==
Wells married in 1948, Lucinda, eldest daughter of Francis R Meath Baker, of Hasfield Court, Gloucestershire. In 1958 the family moved to Mere House in Mereworth, Kent. The house had been built in the 18th century by Sir Francis Dashwood, a distant ancestor of Lucinda. The Wells family have themselves had a long association with West Kent dating back to at least the 16th century, and were mentioned by Samuel Pepys in his famous diary as owners of a successful shipbuilders on the Thames. Together the Wellses had two sons (WA Andrew, High Sheriff of Kent in 2005–06, and Oliver) and two daughters (the late Julia, Mrs James Luard, and Henrietta, homeopathic practitioner and author). Lady Wells died on 24 February 2013. Wells was a freemason.

Parliament of the United Kingdom
Preceded by Sir Alfred Bossom	Member of Parliament for Maidstone; 1959–1987	Succeeded by Ann Widdecombe
