= Edward Maplesden =

English politician

Edward Maplesden (by 1558 – 4 August 1626), of Maidstone, Kent, was an English politician.

He was a member (MP) of the parliament of England for Maidstone in 1625.
