= Carlyon Bellairs =

British naval officer and politician (1871–1955)

Commander Carlyon Bellairs
- Bellairs in 1906

Member of Parliament
- In office 22 February 1915 – 7 October 1931
- Preceded by: Charles Vane-Tempest-Stewart
- Succeeded by: Alfred Bossom
- Constituency: Maidstone
- In office 8 February 1906 – 10 February 1910
- Preceded by: Thomas Gibson Bowles
- Succeeded by: Thomas Gibson Bowles
- Constituency: King's Lynn

Personal details
- Born: Carlyon Wilfroy Bellairs; 15 March 1871 Gibraltar
- Died: 22 August 1955 (aged 84) Barbados
- Party: Conservative (from 1912)
- Other political affiliations: Liberal (before 1909); Liberal Unionist (1909–1912)
- Spouse: Charlotte (m. 1911; died 1939)
- Parent: William Bellairs (father)

Military service
- Allegiance: United Kingdom
- Branch/service: Royal Navy
- Years of service: Until 15 March 1902
- Rank: Commander

Commander Carlyon Wilfroy Bellairs (15 March 1871 – 22 August 1955) was a British Royal Navy officer and politician.

Bellairs was born at Gibraltar, the son of Lieutenant-General Sir William Bellairs, KCMG, and Blanche St. John Bellairs.

He was a Lieutenant of the Royal Navy, and was placed on the retired list 15 March 1902.

In the 1906 general election he was elected to Parliament for King's Lynn as a Liberal, but in October 1909 crossed the floor to sit as a Liberal Unionist. In the January 1910 general election he unsuccessfully stood for election at West Salford and in December 1910 was also defeated at Walthamstow.

In 1911 Bellairs was married to Charlotte, daughter of Colonel H. L. Pierson of Long Island, USA. From 1913 he was a member of the London County Council as Municipal Reform Party member for Lewisham, resigning on 17 April 1915.

He returned to Parliament as Conservative member for Maidstone at a by-election in February 1915, and was re-elected for the Maidstone division of Kent in 1918. He retired from Parliament at the 1931 general election, having declined a baronetcy in 1927.

Charlotte Bellairs died in 1939. Carlyon Bellairs lived at 10 Eaton Place, London and Gore Court, Maidstone, Kent, and was a member of the Carlton Club and the Coefficients dining club of social reformers set up in 1902 by the Fabian campaigners Sidney and Beatrice Webb. He died in Barbados in 1955 aged 84.

Carlyon Bellairs bequeathed his Barbados home, called Seabourne, as a research institute dedicated to the study of marine biology. McGill University in Montreal, Canada, founded Bellairs Research Institute in 1954 on the property. The institute has been expanded since, but the original house can still be seen close to shore and is often used as accommodation for visiting academics.

== Works ==
- "The Navy and the Empire" . The Empire and the century. London: John Murray. 1905. pp. 197–212.

Parliament of the United Kingdom
Preceded by Thomas Gibson Bowles	Member of Parliament for King's Lynn; 1906 – January 1910	Succeeded by Thomas Gibson Bowles
Preceded by Viscount Castlereagh	Member of Parliament for Maidstone; 1915 – 1931	Succeeded by Sir Alfred Bossom
