= Alexander Henry Ross =

British barrister and politician

Alexander Henry Ross (1829 – 3 December 1888) was a British barrister and Conservative politician.

Ross was born in Marylebone, the son of Charles Ross and Lady Mary Cornwallis daughter of Sir Charles Cornwallis, 2nd Marquess Cornwallis and Lady Louisa Gordon.

Ross served as a major in the militia and as a J. P. and was living at Portland Place, London. In 1880 he was elected as one of the MPs for Maidstone. In 1885 representation was reduced to one member, but Ross retained the seat until his death three years later at the age of 59.

Ross married Juliana Moseley of Bobbongton Staffs in 1859 and had a family. Mrs. Ross died in early 1902.

Parliament of the United Kingdom
Preceded by Sir John Lubbock; Sir Sydney Waterlow	Member of Parliament for Maidstone; 1880–1888; With: John Evans Freke-Aylmer 1880–1885	Succeeded by Fiennes Cornwallis
