= Sir Francis Evans, 1st Baronet =

British civil engineer, businessman and Liberal politician

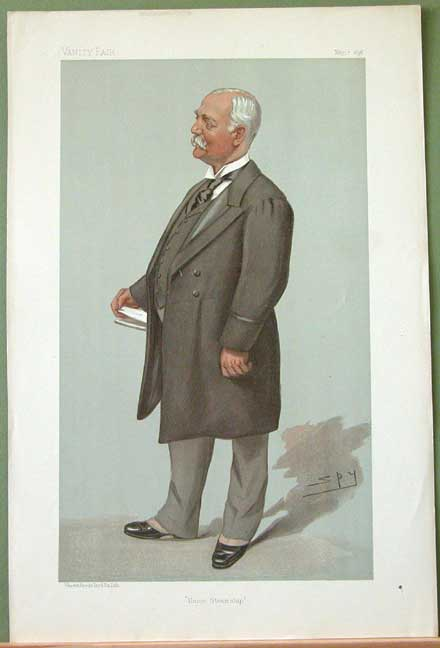
"Union Steamship". Caricature by Spy published in Vanity Fair in 1896.

Sir Francis Henry Evans, 1st Baronet, KCMG (29 August 1840 – 22 January 1907) was a British civil engineer, businessman and Liberal Party politician.

== Family and education ==
Evans was born at Crumpsall Grange in Lancashire the son of William Evans of Manchester and his wife Mary, née Nicholson. His sister Emily Evans was married to industrialist and politician Sir Charles Seely, 1st Baronet, and his nephew was the Secretary of State for War (1912–1914) J. E. B. Seely, 1st Baron Mottistone.

He was educated at the Moravian School in Neuwied in the Rhineland-Palatinate on the banks of the River Rhine and then at Manchester New College, London. In 1872, he married the widow of Irving Van Wart, Marie de Grasse Stevens, the daughter of the Hon Samuel Stevens of Albany, New York, who, though described in The Times as sometime New York State Attorney General, never in fact held that position, having lost the nomination by three votes in January 1839. They had three sons and two daughters.

== Career ==
=== Civil engineering ===
It was first intended that Evans should become a civil engineer. He was therefore articled to Sir James Brunlees with whom he worked on a number of projects including the construction of the London and North Western Railway system. Under Brunlees' direction, Evans worked on the construction of a railway in Brazil. He then went to America with his father during the time of the Civil War and travelled extensively, including taking part in scouting expeditions in Texas.

=== Banking and shipping ===
While in the United States, Evans got involved in business, finding he had a flair for banking in particular. He went on to found the firm Melville, Evans & Company conducting banking transactions between business interests in Britain and America. He later diversified into shipping and in 1880 he joined the board of Union Steamship Company rising to become chairman and managing director. In 1900, the company merged with the Castle Line to form the Union-Castle Line and Evans joined the firm of Donald Currie & Co, managers of the Union-Castle Line, and remained a partner until he died.

=== Newfoundland ===
Evans had substantial business interests in Newfoundland, then a colony of Great Britain. It was probably Evans' knowledge of railway construction that led to his involvement in Newfoundland affairs. In 1881, a syndicate known as the Newfoundland Railway Company, under the direction of A. L. Blackman of New York, obtained government support to build a railway from St. John's to Hall's Bay at the western end of Notre Dame Bay. Melville, Evans and Company arranged much of the financing needed before work could begin. When the Newfoundland Railway Company declared bankruptcy in 1884, Melville, Evans and Company were appointed receivers of the company on behalf of the bondholders, and also as operators of the railway, which they did for 12 years, until the government purchased the railway in 1896. A document dated 1892 lists Evans as Receiver and Manager of the Southern Division of the Newfoundland Railway.

Further involvement in Newfoundland affairs, perhaps because of his knowledge of Newfoundland and his experience with the railway deal, resulted in Evans' appointment to a commission representing the interests of the Newfoundland government in their fisheries dispute with France in the late 1880s and early 1890s. It is claimed that Evans' work on this commission contributed greatly towards his knighthood in 1893, prior to being made a baronet in 1902. Thereafter Evans always took a special interest in Newfoundland affairs when they were discussed in Parliament.

=== Other business interests ===
Evans was a sometime director of the Thames and Mersey Marine Insurance Company and of the International Sleeping Car Company.

== Politics ==
Evans was said to be a friend of the Prime Minister W E Gladstone and seems to have been drawn into politics through that acquaintanceship. He was first returned to Parliament at a by-election in May 1888 as one of the two members of parliament (MP) for Southampton.

Evans was not in the country during the election campaign. He was on a ship returning to England from Newfoundland. He arrived to find himself an MP, the campaign having been conducted in his absence and his interests having been represented by his wife.

He was re-elected in 1892, but lost the seat at the 1895 general election to the Liberal Unionist candidate Sir John Simeon. However, the election of Southampton's other MP, the Conservative Tankerville Chamberlayne, was declared void on petition, and in February 1896 Evans won the resulting by-election with a majority of only 33 votes (0.2%).

He was defeated again by Chamberlayne at the general election in October 1900, but a vacancy soon occurred in Maidstone, where the election had been voided on petition. Evans won the Maidstone by-election on 1 March 1901, but lost the seat in 1906.

== Honours and appointments ==
Evans was made a Knight Commander of the Order of St Michael and St George (KCMG) in 1893. Later that year he was appointed to the Commission of Lieutenancy of the City of London. In 1894 he was appointed to a Board of Trade committee to look into the undermanning of British ships and the proper penalties for those sending such ships to sea. He later sat on another Board of Trade enquiry into the International Regulations for Preventing Collisions at Sea. In 1896, Evans was made a vice-president of the City of London Liberal Association. Among the other men similarly appointed at the same time was future party leader H H Asquith. It was announced that he would receive a baronetcy in the 1902 Coronation Honours list published on 26 June 1902 for the (subsequently postponed) coronation of King Edward VII, and on 24 July 1902 he was created a Baronet, of Tubbendens, in the parish of Farnborough, in the county of Kent.

== Death ==
Evans died of Angina pectoris, at his London home in Grosvenor Place, on 22 January 1907 aged 66 after a short illness. He was buried in Orpington in Kent where he had a home, Tubbendens.

== Papers ==
A journal kept by Sir Francis Evans for over thirty years and containing extracts from another book (now missing) in which he kept family and business records and the signatures of those present at his Christmas dinner, is deposited in the Local Studies and Archives section of the Bromley Public Library. The journal is written in an informal lively style, mainly detailing his widespread travels at home and abroad, family problems and illnesses, and his own accounts of events affecting his political and business career. For example, the entry for 19 September 1873 has a dramatic description of a 'run' on his bank, Jay, Cooke, McCulloch & Co., the reasons for which are not clear, but by 1879 two of his partners had left the firm, one of whom, Puleston, he sued ostensibly for having embezzled £10,000 for speculative investment. Not until 1882 can he record that 'I consider myself well repaid for all the work and annoyance the suit imposed on me.'

In 1888, while he was in America, the Southampton by-election (at which he was standing) was held, and he gives his own exciting version of the hectic travelling to get back as soon as possible, and his attempts on arrival to discover the result from the ship's pilots. He also recounts his tumultuous reception and ascribes his success in the election wholly to his wife's efforts in his absence. Some papers relating to Evans' business activities in Newfoundland are deposited in the Archives and Special Collections, Queen Elizabeth II Library, Memorial University of Newfoundland, St. John's, Newfoundland & Labrador, Canada. This collection consists of a copy of a deposition given by Francis Henry Evans, in his capacity as receiver and manager of the Southern Division of the Newfoundland Railway, to agents of the Supreme Court of Newfoundland at London on 17 & 18 July 1896, in a case by Evans against the Government of Newfoundland for breach of contract. In addition to the 15 pages of testimony there are copies of a number of pieces of correspondence relevant to the case and a copy of a petition from Evans to the Newfoundland Governor seeking restitution.

Parliament of the United Kingdom
Preceded by John Edmund Commerell; Alfred Giles	Member of Parliament for Southampton; 1888 – 1895; With: Alfred Giles to 1892; Tankerville Chamberlayne from 1892	Succeeded by Sir John Simeon, Bt; Tankerville Chamberlayne
Preceded by Tankerville Chamberlayne; Sir John Simeon, Bt	Member of Parliament for Southampton; 1896 – 1900; With: Sir John Simeon, Bt	Succeeded by Tankerville Chamberlayne; Sir John Simeon, Bt
Preceded by John Barker	Member of Parliament for Maidstone; 1901 – 1906	Succeeded by Viscount Castlereagh
Baronetage of the United Kingdom
New creation	Baronet (of Tubbendens); 1902–1907	Succeeded by Murland de Grasse Evans
