= Sir John Barker, 1st Baronet =

British politician (1840–1914)

Member of Parliament
- In office 1906–1910
- Preceded by: Frederick Horniman
- Succeeded by: Sydney Goldman
- Constituency: Penryn and Falmouth
- In office 1900–1901
- Preceded by: Fiennes Cornwallis
- Succeeded by: Francis Evans
- Constituency: Maidstone

Personal details
- Born: 6 April 1840 Loose, Kent, England
- Died: 16 December 1914 (aged 74)
- Party: Liberal
- Occupation: Businessman; politician

Sir John Barker, 1st Baronet (6 April 1840 – 16 December 1914) was a British entrepreneur of the late 19th and early 20th century. He was the founder of the Barkers department store in Kensington, London, United Kingdom.

== Early life ==
John Barker was born on 6 April 1840 in Loose, Kent, England. He grew up in Maidstone, where his father, Joseph Barker, was a brewer. He was apprenticed as a draper in Maidstone for three years.

== Career ==
Barker began his career by working as a draper in Folkestone and Dover. In 1858, he worked for Spencer, Turner & Boldero in Marylebone, London. He subsequently worked for William Whiteley on Westbourne Grove in Bayswater, London. After Whiteley refused to partner with Barker, the latter decided to open a store on Kensington High Street with Sir James Whitehead, 1st Baronet instead. As a result, the two men founded Barkers of Kensington. It became a public company known as John Barker & Co Ltd in 1894.

Barker was an Alderman of the first London County Council and Liberal MP for Maidstone 1900–1901, and for the now abolished constituency of Penryn and Falmouth in Cornwall from 1906 to 1910. He was awarded a baronetcy in 1908.

Escutcheon of the Barker baronets of Bishop's Stortford

== Personal life and death ==
Barker lived at The Grange, Rye Street, Bishop's Stortford. Its grounds included what is now Grange Park and Broadfield. His daughter Annie married Tresham Gilbey, one of the sons of Sir Walter Gilbey.

Barker died on 16 December 1914.

Parliament of the United Kingdom
Preceded by Fiennes Cornwallis	Member of Parliament for Maidstone; 1900–1901	Succeeded by Sir Francis Evans
Preceded by Frederick John Horniman	Member of Parliament for Penryn and Falmouth; 1906–1910	Succeeded by Charles Sydney Goldman
Baronetage of the United Kingdom
New creation	Baronet (of Bishop's Stortford); 1908–1914	Extinct
Preceded by Shaw baronets	Barker baronets of Bishop's Stortford; 1 December 1908	Succeeded by Hatch baronets
