= John Evans Freke-Aylmer =

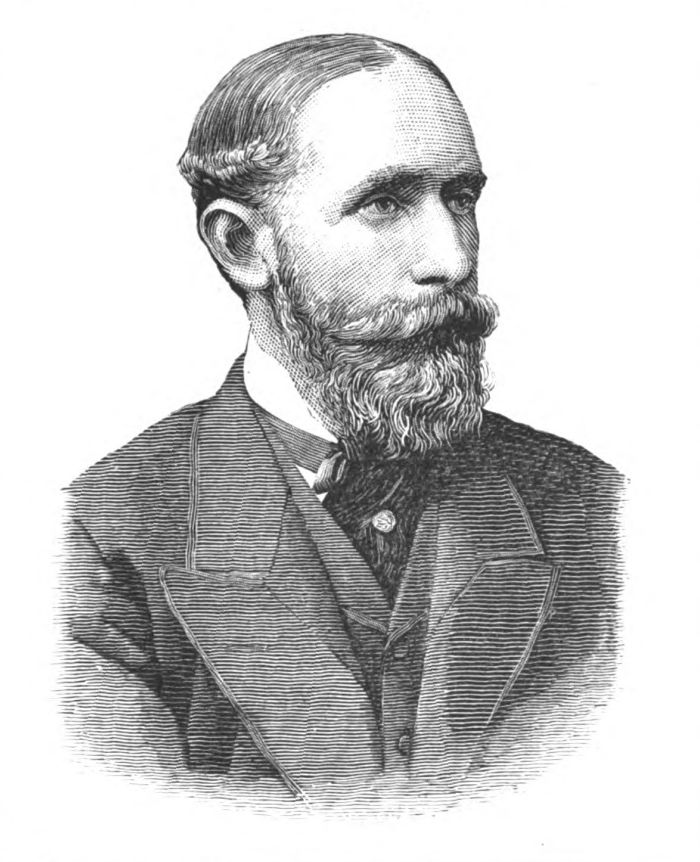
1886 engraving of John Evans Freke-Aylmer

John Evans Freke-Aylmer (23 February 1838 – 14 October 1907) was a British army officer, businessman and a Conservative politician who sat in the House of Commons from 1880 to 1885

Aylmer was the son of Sir Arthur Percy Aylmer, 11th baronet of Clarance Place, Cork and his wife Martha Reynell, daughter of Richard Reynell of Killynon, co Westmeath. He was educated at Trinity College, Dublin, and joined the Army as ensign in the 33rd Regiment of Foot in 1855. He was subsequently lieutenant in the 8th Regiment of Foot, and retired as captain in the 54th Regiment of Foot. He was on the staffs of Schools of Musketry at Bombay, and later at Fleetwood and was a member of the Government Small Arms Committee. After retiring from the Army he was engaged in mining and railway businesses, being chairman of the Sevenoaks, Maidstone and Tunbridge Railway. He was also a director of the Royal Exchange Bank.

In the 1880 general election, Aylmer was elected Member of Parliament for Maidstone and he held the seat until representation was reduced to one seat under the Redistribution of Seats Act 1885 for the 1885 general election.

Aylmer married Frances Margareta Thomson, youngest daughter of James Thomson of Gibraltar in 1861.

Parliament of the United Kingdom
Preceded by Sir Sydney Waterlow; Sir John Lubbock	Member of Parliament for Maidstone; 1880–1885; With: Alexander Henry Ross	Succeeded by Alexander Henry Ross
