= Thomas Rider (MP for Maidstone) =

English politician

Thomas Rider (c. 1648 – by 1704), of Boughton Monchelsea Place, Kent, was an English politician.

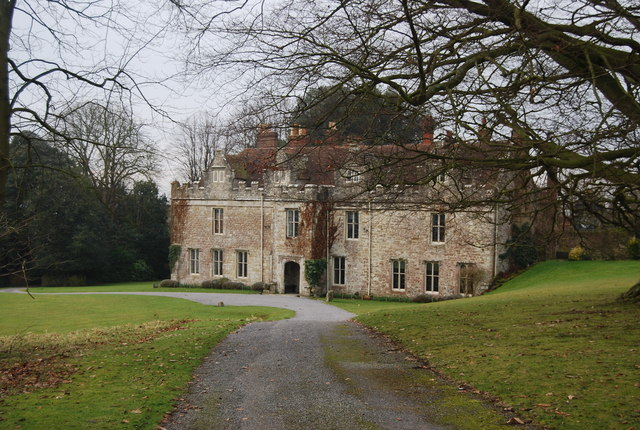
Boughton Monchelsea Place, Kent

He was the son of Sir William Rider of Bethnal Green, Middlesex and educated at St John's College, Oxford and the Middle Temple (1664). He married in 1682, Philadelphia, the daughter and coheiress of Sir Robert Barnham, 1st Bt., of Boughton Monchelsea. He purchased his father-in-law's estate in Romney Marsh and c.1685 acquired Boughton Monchelsea Place when it was inherited by his wife.

He was a Member (MP) of the Parliament of England for Maidstone in 1690–1695 and 1696–1698.

He died by 1704, leaving 2 sons and a daughter. Boughton Monchelsea Place passed to his son Barnham Rider.
