= John Darell (died 1694) =

English politician

Sir John Darell (1645–1694), of Calehill, Little Chart, Kent, was an English politician.

He was a member (MP) of the parliament of England for Maidstone in March 1679 and for Rye in October 1679, 1681, 1689 and 1690 – 24 January 1694.
