= Maidstone (constituency) =

Former parliamentary constituency in the United Kingdom

- Former county constituency for the House of Commons
- Maidstone in Kent, showing boundaries used from 1983–1997
- County: Kent
- Major settlements: Maidstone

1918–1997
- Seats: One
- Replaced by: Maidstone & The Weald

1560–1918
- Seats: 1560–1885: Two; 1885–1918: One
- Type of constituency: Borough constituency

Maidstone was a parliamentary constituency represented in the Parliament of England, Great Britain and from 1801 the House of Commons of the Parliament of the United Kingdom.

The parliamentary borough of Maidstone returned two Members of Parliament (MPs) from 1552 until 1885, when its representation was reduced to one member. The borough was abolished in 1918 and replaced with a county division of the same name, which was abolished for the 1997 general election, and partially replaced by the new Maidstone and The Weald constituency.

== History ==
=== Before the 19th century ===
Maidstone was first enfranchised as a parliamentary borough, electing two Members of Parliament, in 1552; at the time it was one of the largest English towns not already represented, and was one of a number of boroughs either enfranchised or re-enfranchised during the reign of Edward VI. However, barely had it won the right than its charter was cancelled after the accession of Mary I as a punishment for the town's part in Wyatt's Rebellion. This was the only recorded instance of a borough's right to return MPs being directly revoked until Grampound was disfranchised for corruption in the 1820s (although there were other cases of temporary suspension or of the right lapsing through disuse in medieval times, when representation was less valued).

After the death of Mary I, Maidstone's right were restored, and it elected members to the Parliament of 1560, since when the constituency has been continuously represented. The borough consisted of the whole parish of Maidstone, although the boundaries had no practical effect - the right to vote was vested in the freemen of the town, whether or not they were resident within the borough, provided they were not receiving poor relief. In 1833, just after this franchise was reformed by the Great Reform Act, it was estimated that there were 845 freemen, of whom more than 300 lived over seven miles from the town, and 31 of whom were disqualified from voting because they were in receipt of alms. At the 1831 general election, between 600 and 670 men voted.

A borough of this size was too large to fall under the dominance of a local landowner as was usual in the case of the smaller constituencies in the Unreformed Parliament, and Maidstone remained comparatively free with elections sometimes vigorously contested (and usually expensive for the candidates), although the Finch and Marsham families both had a degree of influence over results in the 18th century. Namier describes in detail the Maidstone election of 1761, showing how at this period the organised divisions among the rank-and-file voters in competitive constituencies tended to be religious rather than party-political; the Whig faction in Maidstone drew its strength from the Nonconformists while the Tories were the Anglican establishment. Yet so complicated was the politics of the period that although the local Whigs had asked Rose Fuller, a personal friend of the Whig Prime Minister The Duke of Newcastle, to stand as their candidate Newcastle refused to support him; indeed, Newcastle used his government patronage to force those of the electors employed in the naval dockyard at Chatham to vote for the incumbent Tory MPs, to whom he had already promised his support before Fuller's candidacy was mooted. In the event, though, Fuller succeeded in being elected, many of the government employees defying Newcastle to support him.

=== After the Reform Act ===
At the time of the Reform Act, the population of the borough was 15,387, and it contained 3,018 houses. The boundaries of the borough remained unchanged until 1918. Under the reformed franchise, there were 1,108 electors registered to vote at the general election of 1832. The town continued to grow so that by 1865 the electorate had reached 1,817, and this was almost doubled by the extension of the franchise in the second reform act, so that there were 3,420 registered electors for the 1868 general election.

The borough retained two MPs until 1885, when its representation was halved; at the 1885 general election the franchise now extended to 6,530 electors, voting for a population of around 35,000. This was a relatively small electorate for the period and made bribery a practical proposition, and Maidstone was one of a small number of constituencies where corruption was proved after the tightening of election law in the 1880s. Generally a fairly safe Conservative seat, the constituency elected a Liberal candidate against the national tide in 1900, but it was clear that corrupt practices had contributed to his victory and he was unseated on petition; the voters seem to have resented the petition, however, and also elected the Liberal candidate in the ensuing by-election. At the following election in 1906, Maidstone again swung in the opposite direction to the country as a whole, electing a Conservative - one of only five Unionist gains across the country - and the victor was again charged with corruption; on this occasion the candidate was acquitted, but one of the judges noted that "there exists among the voters of this borough a number of the lower class who expect, and are known to respect, a payment or reward for their votes... The proved cases of bribery extend through all the wards."

=== The county constituency ===
The borough was abolished with effect from the general election of 1918, but the Maidstone name was transferred to the new county division in which the town stood, which consisted of Maidstone itself and the Maidstone and Hollingbourne rural districts. These contained no towns of any size, but the villages collectively outvoted Maidstone. The new constituency was as safely Conservative as its predecessor, and its boundaries remained unaltered until 1983.

By the 1980s, population growth meant that the constituency was considerably oversized, with one of the largest electorates in England. In the 1983 boundary revisions, which for the first time reflected the local government boundary changes of the 1970s, the size of the Maidstone constituency was considerably reduced. The area to the north-east of the town, and two wards of the town itself, were moved into the new Mid Kent constituency; as these were strongly Conservative wards and there had been a Liberal surge in the area around the time the Liberal-SDP Alliance was formed, the Alliance had some hopes of making a breakthrough in the revised constituency. However, they could only cut the Tory majority to a little over 7,000 in 1983, John Wells taking over half the votes.

Boundary changes in 1997 saw the constituency abolished and replaced with a new Maidstone and The Weald county constituency. The Maidstone town wards which had been in Mid Kent since 1983 were included in the new seat, and a rural part of the Weald to the south of the town, previously in the Tunbridge Wells constituency was also included; but about a third of the electorate in the Maidstone constituency was transferred to the Faversham and Mid Kent constituency - this included the rural wards to the east of the town, but also the Shepway and Park Wood areas of Maidstone proper.

== Boundaries ==
1885-1918: The existing parliamentary borough, excluding a detached part of the parish of Maidstone known as Lodington.

== Members of Parliament ==
=== Maidstone borough ===
==== MPs 1560-1660 ====
| Parliament | First member | Second member |
|---|---|---|
| 1562–3 | Nicholas Barham | Henry Fisher |
| 1571 | Thomas Walsingham | Nicholas St Leger |
| 1572 | Nicholas St Leger | Thomas Dannett |
| 1584 | Thomas Randolph | Michael Sondes |
| 1586 | John Astley | Thomas Randolph |
| 1588 | John Astley | Thomas Randolph |
| 1593 | Sir Thomas Fludd | Lewen Buffkyn |
| 1597 | Sir Thomas Fludd | Sir John Leveson |
| 1601 | Sir Thomas Fludd | Sir John Leveson |
| 1604-1611 | Sir Francis Fane | Laurence Washington |
| 1614 | Sir Francis Fane | Sir John Scott |
| 1621-1622 | Sir Francis Fane | Sir Francis Barnham |
| 1624 | Sir George Fane | Thomas Stanley |
| 1625 | Edward Mapleton | Thomas Stanley |
| 1626 | Sir George Fane | Francis Barnham |
| 1628 | Sir George Fane | Francis Barnham |
| 1629–1640 | No Parliaments summoned | |
| 1640 (Apr) | Sir George Fane | Sir Francis Barnham |
| 1640 (Nov) | Sir Francis Barnham,died Nov 1646 | Sir Humfrey Tufton |
| 1645 | Thomas Twisden | Sir Humfrey Tufton not sat after Pride's Purge, Dec 1648 |
| 1648 | Thomas Twisden excluded in Pride's Purge, Dec 1648 | |
| 1653 | Maidstone was unrepresented in the Barebones Parliament | |
| 1654 | Sir John Banks | (One seat only) |
| 1656 | Sir John Banks | (One seat only) |
| 1659 | Sir John Banks | Andrew Broughton |

==== MPs 1660-1885 ====
| Year | First member | First party | Second member | Second party |
|---|---|---|---|---|
| April 1660 | Thomas Twisden | | Robert Barnham | |
| August 1660 | Sir Edward Hales | | Robert Barnham | |
| 1661 | Sir Edmund Pierce | | Robert Barnham | |
| 1668 | Thomas Harlackenden | | Robert Barnham | |
| February 1679 | Sir John Tufton | | Sir John Darell | |
| August 1679 | Sir John Tufton | | Thomas Fane | |
| March 1685 | Sir John Tufton | | Archibald Clinkard | |
| November 1685 | Edwin Wyatt | | Archibald Clinkard | |
| 1689 | Sir Thomas Taylor | | Caleb Banks | |
| 1690 | Sir Thomas Taylor | | Thomas Rider | |
| 1695 | Sir Thomas Taylor | | Sir John Banks | |
| 1696 | Thomas Rider | | Sir John Banks | |
| 1698 | Sir Robert Marsham | | Thomas Bliss | |
| July 1702 | Sir Robert Marsham | | Sir Thomas Roberts | |
| October 1702 | Writ suspended - both seats vacant | | | |
| 1704 | Heneage Finch | | Thomas Bliss | |
| 1705 | Sir Thomas Culpeper | | Thomas Bliss | |
| 1708 | Sir Thomas Culpeper | | Sir Robert Marsham | |
| 1713 | Sir Samuel Ongley | | Sir Robert Marsham | |
| 1715 | Sir Thomas Culpeper | | Sir Robert Marsham | |
| 1716 | Sir Thomas Culpeper | | Sir Barnham Rider | |
| 1722 | Sir Thomas Culpeper | | John Finch | |
| 1723 | Sir Barnham Rider | | John Finch | |
| 1727 | Thomas Hope | | John Finch | |
| 1734 | William Horsemonden-Turner | | John Finch | |
| 1740 | William Horsemonden-Turner | | Robert Fairfax | |
| 1741 | Lord Guernsey | | John Bligh | |
| 1747 | William Horsemonden-Turner | | Robert Fairfax | |
| 1753 | Gabriel Hanger | Tory | Robert Fairfax | |
| 1754 | Gabriel Hanger | Tory | Lord Guernsey | |
| 1757 | Gabriel Hanger | Tory | Savile Finch | |
| 1761 | Rose Fuller | Whig | William Northey | Tory |
| 1768 | Hon. Charles Marsham | | Robert Gregory | |
| 1774 | Sir Horatio Mann | | Lord Guernsey | |
| 1777 | Sir Horatio Mann | | Hon. Charles Finch | |
| 1780 | Sir Horatio Mann | | Clement Taylor | Whig |
| 1784 | Gerard Edwardes | Tory | Clement Taylor | Whig |
| 1788 | Sir Matthew Bloxham | Tory | Clement Taylor | Whig |
| 1796 | Sir Matthew Bloxham | Tory | Major General Oliver de Lancey | Tory |
| 1802 | Sir Matthew Bloxham | Tory | John Hodsdon Durand | Whig |
| 1806 | George Simson | Tory | George Longman | Whig |
| 1812 | George Simson | Tory | Egerton Brydges | Tory |
| 1818 | Abraham Wildey Robarts | Whig | George Longman | Whig |
| 1820 | Abraham Wildey Robarts | Whig | John Wells | Tory |
| 1830 | Abraham Wildey Robarts | Whig | Henry Winchester | Tory |
| 1831 | Abraham Wildey Robarts | Whig | Charles James Barnett | Whig |
| 1835 | Abraham Wildey Robarts | Whig | Wyndham Lewis | Conservative |
| 1837 | Benjamin Disraeli | Conservative | Wyndham Lewis | Conservative |
| 1838 | Benjamin Disraeli | Conservative | John Minet Fector | Conservative |
| 1841 | Alexander Hope | Conservative | George Dodd | Conservative |
| 1852 | James Whatman | Radical | George Dodd | Conservative |
| 1853 | James Whatman | Radical | William Lee | Radical |
| 1857 | Alexander Beresford Hope | Conservative | Edward Scott | Conservative |
| 1859 | Charles Buxton | Liberal | William Lee | Liberal |
| 1865 | James Whatman | Liberal | William Lee | Liberal |
| 1870 | James Whatman | Liberal | Sir John Lubbock | Liberal |
| 1874 | Sir Sydney Waterlow | Liberal | Sir John Lubbock | Liberal |
| 1880 | Alexander Henry Ross | Conservative | John Evans Freke-Aylmer | Conservative |
| 1885 | Representation reduced to one member | | | |

==== MPs 1885-1918 ====
| Election | Member | Party |
|---|---|---|
| 1885 | Alexander Henry Ross | Conservative |
| 1888 | Fiennes Cornwallis | Conservative |
| 1895 | Sir Frederick Hunt | Conservative |
| 1898 | Fiennes Cornwallis | Conservative |
| 1900 | John Barker | Liberal |
| 1901 | Sir Francis Evans | Liberal |
| 1906 | Viscount Castlereagh | Conservative |
| 1915 | Carlyon Bellairs | Conservative |
| 1918 | Borough abolished; county division created | |

=== Maidstone County Constituency (1918–1997) ===
| Election | Member | Party |
|---|---|---|
| 1918 | Carlyon Bellairs | Conservative |
| 1931 | Alfred Bossom | Conservative |
| 1959 | John Wells | Conservative |
| 1987 | Ann Widdecombe | Conservative |
| 1997 | constituency abolished: see Maidstone and The Weald | |

== Elections ==
=== Elections in the 1830s ===
General election 1830: Maidstone (2 seats)
| Party | Candidate | Votes | % | ±% |
|---|---|---|---|---|
| Whig | Abraham Wildey Robarts | 470 | 44.4 | |
| Tory | Henry Winchester | 387 | 36.6 | |
| Tory | Philip Rawlings | 195 | 18.4 | |
| Whig | William George Tyssen Daniel Tyssen | 6 | 0.6 | |
| Turnout | | 752 | c. 85.9 | |
| Registered electors | | c. 875 | | |
| Majority | | 83 | 7.8 | |
| Whig hold | | Swing | | |
| Majority | | 381 | 36.0 | |
| Tory hold | | Swing | | |

General election 1831: Maidstone (2 seats)
| Party | Candidate | Votes | % | ±% |
|---|---|---|---|---|
| Whig | Abraham Wildey Robarts | 478 | 38.1 | −6.3 |
| Whig | Charles James Barnett | 441 | 35.2 | +34.6 |
| Tory | Henry Winchester | 185 | 14.8 | −21.8 |
| Tory | George Simson | 150 | 12.0 | −6.4 |
| Majority | | 256 | 20.4 | +12.6 |
| Turnout | | 654 | c. 74.7 | c. −11.2 |
| Registered electors | | c. 875 | | |
| Whig hold | | Swing | +3.9 | |
| Whig gain from Tory | | Swing | +24.4 | |

General election 1832: Maidstone (2 seats)
| Party | Candidate | Votes | % | ±% |
|---|---|---|---|---|
| Whig | Abraham Wildey Robarts | 500 | 35.9 | −2.2 |
| Whig | Charles James Barnett | 469 | 33.7 | −1.5 |
| Tory | Wyndham Lewis | 422 | 30.3 | +3.5 |
| Majority | | 47 | 3.4 | −17.0 |
| Turnout | | 873 | 78.8 | c. +4.1 |
| Registered electors | | 1,108 | | |
| Whig hold | | Swing | −2.0 | |
| Whig hold | | Swing | −1.6 | |

General election 1835: Maidstone (2 seats)
| Party | Candidate | Votes | % | ±% |
|---|---|---|---|---|
| Conservative | Wyndham Lewis | 529 | 41.7 | +11.4 |
| Whig | Abraham Wildey Robarts | 398 | 31.4 | −4.5 |
| Whig | Charles James Barnett | 333 | 26.3 | −7.4 |
| Conservative | Matthias Prime Lucas | 5 | 0.4 | N/A |
| Conservative | E Hildyard | 3 | 0.2 | N/A |
| Turnout | | 907 | 73.5 | −5.3 |
| Registered electors | | 1,234 | | |
| Majority | | 196 | 15.4 | N/A |
| Conservative gain from Whig | | Swing | +11.7 | |
| Majority | | 393 | 31.0 | +27.6 |
| Whig hold | | Swing | −5.1 | |

General election 1837: Maidstone (2 seats)
| Party | Candidate | Votes | % | ±% |
|---|---|---|---|---|
| Conservative | Wyndham Lewis | 782 | 38.4 | +17.6 |
| Conservative | Benjamin Disraeli | 668 | 32.8 | +12.0 |
| Radical | Thomas Perronet Thompson | 559 | 27.5 | New |
| Radical | Thomas Erskine Perry | 25 | 1.2 | New |
| Majority | | 109 | 5.3 | N/A |
| Turnout | | 1,209 | 86.4 | +12.9 |
| Registered electors | | 1,399 | | |
| Conservative hold | | Swing | +17.6 | |
| Conservative gain from Whig | | Swing | +12.0 | |

Lewis' death caused a by-election.

By-election, 28 March 1838: Maidstone
| Party | Candidate | Votes | % | ±% |
|---|---|---|---|---|
| Conservative | John Minet Fector | 708 | 54.8 | −16.4 |
| Whig | Abraham Wildey Robarts | 583 | 45.2 | N/A |
| Majority | | 125 | 9.6 | +4.3 |
| Turnout | | 1,291 | 87.0 | +0.6 |
| Registered electors | | 1,399 | | |
| Conservative hold | | Swing | −16.4 | |

The by-election was declared void, causing another by-election.

By-election, 15 June 1838: Maidstone
| Party | Candidate | Votes | % | ±% |
|---|---|---|---|---|
| Conservative | John Minet Fector | 707 | 58.0 | −13.2 |
| Whig | Abraham Wildey Robarts | 512 | 42.0 | N/A |
| Majority | | 195 | 16.0 | +10.7 |
| Turnout | | 1,219 | 82.1 | −4.3 |
| Registered electors | | 1,399 | | |
| Conservative hold | | Swing | −13.2 | |

=== Elections in the 1840s ===
General election 1841: Maidstone (2 seats)
| Party | Candidate | Votes | % | ±% |
|---|---|---|---|---|
| Conservative | Alexander Beresford Hope | 765 | 40.1 | +1.7 |
| Conservative | George Dodd | 725 | 38.0 | +5.2 |
| Radical | David Salomons | 418 | 21.9 | −6.8 |
| Majority | | 307 | 16.1 | +10.8 |
| Turnout | | 1,152 | 69.4 | −17.0 |
| Registered electors | | 1,660 | | |
| Conservative hold | | Swing | +2.6 | |
| Conservative hold | | Swing | +4.3 | |

General election 1847: Maidstone (2 seats)
| Party | Candidate | Votes | % | ±% |
|---|---|---|---|---|
| Conservative | Alexander Beresford Hope | Unopposed | | |
| Conservative | George Dodd | Unopposed | | |
| Registered electors | | 1,741 | | |
| Conservative hold | | | | |
| Conservative hold | | | | |

=== Elections in the 1850s ===
General election 1852: Maidstone (2 seats)
| Party | Candidate | Votes | % | ±% |
|---|---|---|---|---|
| Radical | James Whatman | 848 | 39.6 | New |
| Conservative | George Dodd | 709 | 33.1 | N/A |
| Radical | William Lee | 584 | 27.3 | New |
| Turnout | | 1,071 (est) | 61.1 (est) | N/A |
| Registered electors | | 1,751 | | |
| Majority | | 139 | 6.5 | N/A |
| Radical gain from Conservative | | Swing | N/A | |
| Majority | | 125 | 5.8 | N/A |
| Conservative hold | | Swing | N/A | |

Dodd's election was declared void on petition due to treating by his agents, causing a by-election.

By-election, 16 May 1853: Maidstone
| Party | Candidate | Votes | % | ±% |
|---|---|---|---|---|
| Radical | William Lee | 748 | 50.3 | −16.6 |
| Peelite | Charles Wykeham Martin | 738 | 49.7 | +16.6 |
| Majority | | 10 | 0.6 | N/A |
| Turnout | | 1,486 | 81.9 | +20.8 |
| Registered electors | | 1,814 | | |
| Radical gain from Conservative | | Swing | −16.6 | |

General election 1857: Maidstone (2 seats)
| Party | Candidate | Votes | % | ±% |
|---|---|---|---|---|
| Conservative | Alexander Beresford Hope | 801 | 27.6 | +11.0 |
| Conservative | Edward Scott | 759 | 26.1 | +9.5 |
| Radical | William Lee | 689 | 23.7 | −3.6 |
| Whig | Humphrey Francis St John-Mildmay | 655 | 22.6 | −17.0 |
| Majority | | 70 | 2.4 | N/A |
| Turnout | | 1,452 (est) | 90.1 (est) | +29.0 |
| Registered electors | | 1,611 | | |
| Conservative hold | | Swing | +10.7 | |
| Conservative gain from Radical | | Swing | +9.9 | |

General election 1859: Maidstone (2 seats)
| Party | Candidate | Votes | % | ±% |
|---|---|---|---|---|
| Liberal | William Lee | 776 | 25.4 | +1.7 |
| Liberal | Charles Buxton | 776 | 25.4 | +2.8 |
| Conservative | John Wardlaw | 751 | 24.6 | −3.0 |
| Conservative | Egerton Vernon-Harcourt | 749 | 24.5 | −1.6 |
| Majority | | 25 | 0.8 | N/A |
| Turnout | | 1,526 (est) | 82.6 (est) | −7.5 |
| Registered electors | | 1,848 | | |
| Liberal gain from Conservative | | Swing | +2.0 | |
| Liberal gain from Conservative | | Swing | +2.6 | |

=== Elections in the 1860s ===
General election 1865: Maidstone (2 seats)
| Party | Candidate | Votes | % | ±% |
|---|---|---|---|---|
| Liberal | William Lee | 869 | 25.7 | +0.3 |
| Liberal | James Whatman | 867 | 25.7 | +0.3 |
| Conservative | Edward Betts | 838 | 24.8 | +0.2 |
| Conservative | John Wardlaw | 801 | 23.7 | −0.8 |
| Majority | | 29 | 0.9 | +0.1 |
| Turnout | | 1,688 (est) | 92.9 (est) | +10.3 |
| Registered electors | | 1,817 | | |
| Liberal hold | | Swing | +0.3 | |
| Liberal hold | | Swing | +0.3 | |

General election 1868: Maidstone (2 seats)
| Party | Candidate | Votes | % | ±% |
|---|---|---|---|---|
| Liberal | William Lee | 1,569 | 26.6 | +0.9 |
| Liberal | James Whatman | 1,546 | 26.2 | +0.5 |
| Conservative | William Foster White | 1,412 | 23.9 | −0.9 |
| Conservative | George Parbury | 1,369 | 23.2 | −0.5 |
| Majority | | 134 | 2.3 | +1.4 |
| Turnout | | 2,948 (est) | 86.2 (est) | −6.7 |
| Registered electors | | 3,420 | | |
| Liberal hold | | Swing | +0.8 | |
| Liberal hold | | Swing | +0.6 | |

=== Elections in the 1870s ===
Lee's resignation caused a by-election.

By-election, 25 Feb 1870: Maidstone (2 seats)
| Party | Candidate | Votes | % | ±% |
|---|---|---|---|---|
| Liberal | John Lubbock | 1,504 | 51.8 | −1.0 |
| Conservative | William Foster White | 1,402 | 48.2 | +1.1 |
| Majority | | 102 | 3.4 | +1.1 |
| Turnout | | 2,906 | 90.4 | +4.2 |
| Registered electors | | 3,214 | | |
| Liberal hold | | Swing | −1.1 | |

General election 1874: Maidstone (2 seats)
| Party | Candidate | Votes | % | ±% |
|---|---|---|---|---|
| Liberal | John Lubbock | 1,558 | 26.7 | +0.1 |
| Liberal | Sydney Waterlow | 1,491 | 25.6 | −0.6 |
| Conservative | Alexander Henry Ross | 1,414 | 24.3 | +0.4 |
| Conservative | John Constantine Stanley | 1,365 | 23.4 | +0.2 |
| Majority | | 77 | 1.3 | −1.0 |
| Turnout | | 2,914 (est) | 82.9 (est) | −3.3 |
| Registered electors | | 3,517 | | |
| Liberal hold | | Swing | −0.1 | |
| Liberal hold | | Swing | −0.5 | |

=== Elections in the 1880s ===
General election 1880: Maidstone (2 seats)
| Party | Candidate | Votes | % | ±% |
|---|---|---|---|---|
| Conservative | Alexander Henry Ross | 1,965 | 27.5 | +3.2 |
| Conservative | John Evans Freke-Aylmer | 1,832 | 25.6 | +2.2 |
| Liberal | John Lubbock | 1,725 | 24.1 | −2.6 |
| Liberal | Sydney Waterlow | 1,624 | 22.7 | −2.9 |
| Majority | | 240 | 3.4 | N/A |
| Majority | | 208 | 2.9 | N/A |
| Turnout | | 3,573 (est) | 92.1 (est) | +9.2 |
| Registered electors | | 3,878 | | |
| Conservative gain from Liberal | | Swing | +2.9 | |
| Conservative gain from Liberal | | Swing | +2.6 | |

General election 1885: Maidstone
| Party | Candidate | Votes | % | ±% |
|---|---|---|---|---|
| Conservative | Alexander Henry Ross | 2,184 | 54.3 | +1.2 |
| Liberal | Martin Hume | 1,839 | 45.7 | −1.1 |
| Majority | | 345 | 8.6 | +5.2 |
| Turnout | | 4,023 | 94.1 | +2.0 (est) |
| Registered electors | | 4,273 | | |
| Conservative hold | | Swing | +1.2 | |

General election 1886: Maidstone
| Party | Candidate | Votes | % | ±% |
|---|---|---|---|---|
| Conservative | Alexander Henry Ross | 1,917 | 54.5 | +0.2 |
| Liberal | Thomas Proctor Baptie | 1,603 | 45.5 | −0.2 |
| Majority | | 314 | 9.0 | +0.4 |
| Turnout | | 3,520 | 82.4 | −11.7 |
| Registered electors | | 4,273 | | |
| Conservative hold | | Swing | +0.2 | |

Ross' death caused a by-election.

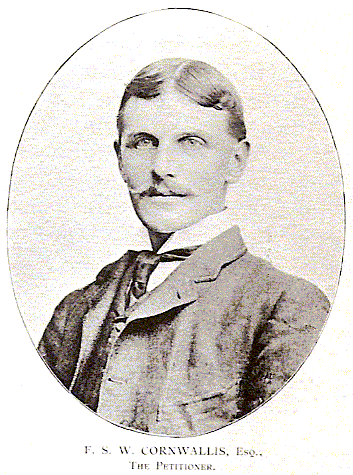
F.S.W. Cornwallis

By-election, 14 Dec 1888: Maidstone
| Party | Candidate | Votes | % | ±% |
|---|---|---|---|---|
| Conservative | Fiennes Cornwallis | 2,050 | 52.4 | −2.1 |
| Liberal | John Barker | 1,865 | 47.6 | +2.1 |
| Majority | | 185 | 4.8 | −4.2 |
| Turnout | | 3,915 | 86.6 | +4.2 |
| Registered electors | | 4,519 | | |
| Conservative hold | | Swing | −2.1 | |

=== Elections in the 1890s ===
General election 1892: Maidstone
| Party | Candidate | Votes | % | ±% |
|---|---|---|---|---|
| Conservative | Fiennes Cornwallis | 2,443 | 60.0 | +5.5 |
| Liberal | Thomas Nussey | 1,627 | 40.0 | −5.5 |
| Majority | | 816 | 20.0 | +11.0 |
| Turnout | | 4,070 | 86.1 | +3.7 |
| Registered electors | | 4,729 | | |
| Conservative hold | | Swing | +5.5 | |

General election 1895: Maidstone
| Party | Candidate | Votes | % | ±% |
|---|---|---|---|---|
| Conservative | Frederick Hunt | Unopposed | | |
| Conservative hold | | | | |

1898 Maidstone by-election
| Party | Candidate | Votes | % | ±% |
|---|---|---|---|---|
| Conservative | Fiennes Cornwallis | 2,214 | 52.1 | N/A |
| Liberal | John Barker | 2,036 | 47.9 | New |
| Majority | | 178 | 4.2 | N/A |
| Turnout | | 4,250 | 87.4 | N/A |
| Registered electors | | 4,865 | | |
| Conservative hold | | Swing | N/A | |

=== Elections in the 1900s ===
John Barker

General election 1900: Maidstone
| Party | Candidate | Votes | % | ±% |
|---|---|---|---|---|
| Liberal | John Barker | 2,201 | 50.4 | N/A |
| Conservative | Fiennes Cornwallis | 2,163 | 49.6 | N/A |
| Majority | | 38 | 0.8 | N/A |
| Turnout | | 4,364 | 86.1 | N/A |
| Registered electors | | 5,068 | | |
| Liberal gain from Conservative | | Swing | N/A | |

- unseated on petition

1901 Maidstone by-election
| Party | Candidate | Votes | % | ±% |
|---|---|---|---|---|
| Liberal | Francis Evans | 2,375 | 52.1 | +1.7 |
| Conservative | Thomas Milvain | 2,182 | 47.9 | −1.7 |
| Majority | | 193 | 4.2 | +3.4 |
| Turnout | | 4,557 | 88.1 | +2.0 |
| Registered electors | | 5,170 | | |
| Liberal hold | | Swing | +1.7 | |

General election 1906: Maidstone
| Party | Candidate | Votes | % | ±% |
|---|---|---|---|---|
| Conservative | Viscount Castlereagh | 2,841 | 51.2 | +0.8 |
| Liberal | Francis Evans | 2,709 | 48.8 | −0.8 |
| Majority | | 132 | 2.4 | N/A |
| Turnout | | 5,550 | 94.5 | +8.4 |
| Registered electors | | 5,870 | | |
| Conservative gain from Liberal | | Swing | +1.6 | |

=== Elections in the 1910s ===
Vivian Phillipps

General election January 1910: Maidstone
| Party | Candidate | Votes | % | ±% |
|---|---|---|---|---|
| Conservative | Viscount Castlereagh | 3,094 | 52.1 | +0.9 |
| Liberal | Vivian Phillipps | 2,847 | 47.9 | −0.9 |
| Majority | | 247 | 4.2 | +1.8 |
| Turnout | | 5,941 | 94.0 | −0.5 |
| Registered electors | | 6,260 | | |
| Conservative hold | | Swing | +0.9 | |

General election December 1910: Maidstone
| Party | Candidate | Votes | % | ±% |
|---|---|---|---|---|
| Conservative | Viscount Castlereagh | 2,906 | 50.6 | −1.5 |
| Liberal | Vivian Phillipps | 2,836 | 49.4 | +1.5 |
| Majority | | 70 | 1.2 | −3.0 |
| Turnout | | 5,742 | 91.7 | −3.3 |
| Registered electors | | 6,260 | | |
| Conservative hold | | Swing | -1.5 | |

C.W. Bellairs

1915 Maidstone by-election
| Party | Candidate | Votes | % | ±% |
|---|---|---|---|---|
| Unionist | Carlyon Bellairs | Unopposed | | |
| Unionist hold | | | | |

General election 1918: Maidstone
| Party | | Candidate | Votes | % | ±% |
|---|---|---|---|---|---|
| C | Unionist | Carlyon Bellairs | 11,931 | 65.5 | +14.9 |
| | Labour | Frederick Burgess | 6,277 | 34.5 | New |
| Majority | | | 5,654 | 31.0 | +29.8 |
| Turnout | | | 18,208 | 59.2 | −32.5 |
| Registered electors | | | 30,747 | | |
| | Unionist hold | | Swing | | |
C indicates candidate endorsed by the coalition government.

=== Elections in the 1920s ===
General election 1922: Maidstone
| Party | Candidate | Votes | % | ±% |
|---|---|---|---|---|
| Unionist | Carlyon Bellairs | 8,928 | 34.6 | −30.9 |
| Liberal | George Foster Clark | 8,895 | 34.4 | New |
| Labour | Hugh Dalton | 8,004 | 31.0 | −3.5 |
| Majority | | 33 | 0.2 | −30.8 |
| Turnout | | 25,827 | 78.5 | +19.3 |
| Registered electors | | 32,916 | | |
| Unionist hold | | Swing | −13.7 | |

General election 1923: Maidstone
| Party | Candidate | Votes | % | ±% |
|---|---|---|---|---|
| Unionist | Carlyon Bellairs | 11,244 | 41.9 | +7.3 |
| Liberal | George Foster Clark | 9,047 | 33.7 | −0.7 |
| Labour | Seymour Cocks | 6,558 | 24.4 | −6.6 |
| Majority | | 2,197 | 8.2 | +8.0 |
| Turnout | | 26,849 | 78.9 | +0.4 |
| Registered electors | | 34,037 | | |
| Unionist hold | | Swing | +4.0 | |

General election 1924: Maidstone
| Party | Candidate | Votes | % | ±% |
|---|---|---|---|---|
| Unionist | Carlyon Bellairs | 16,121 | 66.3 | +24.4 |
| Labour | Seymour Cocks | 8,192 | 33.7 | +9.3 |
| Majority | | 7,929 | 32.6 | +24.4 |
| Turnout | | 24,313 | 69.8 | −9.1 |
| Registered electors | | 34,811 | | |
| Unionist hold | | Swing | +7.6 | |

General election 1929: Maidstone
| Party | Candidate | Votes | % | ±% |
|---|---|---|---|---|
| Unionist | Carlyon Bellairs | 14,254 | 40.8 | −25.5 |
| Labour | John Morgan | 10,419 | 29.9 | −3.8 |
| Liberal | Thomas Fairchild Day | 10,222 | 29.3 | New |
| Majority | | 3,835 | 10.9 | −21.7 |
| Turnout | | 34,895 | 77.0 | +7.2 |
| Registered electors | | 45,317 | | |
| Unionist hold | | Swing | −10.9 | |

=== Elections in the 1930s ===
General Election 1931: Maidstone
| Party | Candidate | Votes | % | ±% |
|---|---|---|---|---|
| Conservative | Alfred Bossom | 27,394 | 80.2 | +39.4 |
| Labour | Gertrude Speedwell Massingham | 6,770 | 19.8 | −10.1 |
| Majority | | 20,624 | 60.4 | +49.5 |
| Turnout | | 34,164 | 72.3 | −4.7 |
| Conservative hold | | Swing | | |

General election 1935: Maidstone
| Party | Candidate | Votes | % | ±% |
|---|---|---|---|---|
| Conservative | Alfred Bossom | 24,644 | 72.5 | −7.7 |
| Labour | JW MacAlpine | 9,340 | 27.5 | +7.7 |
| Majority | | 15,304 | 45.0 | −15.4 |
| Turnout | | 33,984 | 67.4 | −4.9 |
| Conservative hold | | Swing | | |

General Election 1939–40: Another General Election was required to take place before the end of 1940. The political parties had been making preparations for an election to take place and by the Autumn of 1939, the following candidates had been selected;

- Conservative: Alfred Bossom
- Labour: Otto L Shaw

=== Elections in the 1940s ===
General election 1945: Maidstone
| Party | Candidate | Votes | % | ±% |
|---|---|---|---|---|
| Conservative | Alfred Bossom | 21,320 | 53.3 | −19.2 |
| Labour | Otto Leslie Shaw | 18,295 | 45.7 | +18.2 |
| Democratic | G Murray | 416 | 1.0 | New |
| Majority | | 3,025 | 7.6 | −37.4 |
| Turnout | | 40,031 | 71.0 | +3.6 |
| Conservative hold | | Swing | -18.7 | |

=== Elections in the 1950s ===
General election 1950: Maidstone
| Party | Candidate | Votes | % | ±% |
|---|---|---|---|---|
| Conservative | Alfred Bossom | 25,008 | 51.11 | |
| Labour | Henry Albert White | 18,377 | 37.56 | |
| Liberal | Thomas Frederick Rice | 5,546 | 11.33 | New |
| Majority | | 6,631 | 13.55 | |
| Turnout | | 48,931 | 81.78 | |
| Conservative hold | | Swing | | |

General election 1951: Maidstone
| Party | Candidate | Votes | % | ±% |
|---|---|---|---|---|
| Conservative | Alfred Bossom | 27,606 | 56.61 | |
| Labour | Henry Albert White | 21,159 | 43.39 | |
| Majority | | 6,447 | 13.22 | |
| Turnout | | 48,765 | 80.54 | |
| Conservative hold | | Swing | | |

General election 1955: Maidstone
| Party | Candidate | Votes | % | ±% |
|---|---|---|---|---|
| Conservative | Alfred Bossom | 27,267 | 57.9 | +1.3 |
| Labour | Otto L Shaw | 19,861 | 42.1 | −1.3 |
| Majority | | 7,406 | 15.8 | +2.6 |
| Turnout | | 47,128 | 77.08 | −10.4 |
| Conservative hold | | Swing | | |

General election 1959: Maidstone
| Party | Candidate | Votes | % | ±% |
|---|---|---|---|---|
| Conservative | John Wells | 30,115 | 60.5 | +2.6 |
| Labour | A B Spencer Soper | 19,652 | 39.5 | −2.6 |
| Majority | | 2,240 | 21.0 | +4.2 |
| Turnout | | 49,767 | 78.6 | +1.5 |
| Conservative hold | | Swing | | |

=== Elections in the 1960s ===
General election 1964: Maidstone
| Party | Candidate | Votes | % | ±% |
|---|---|---|---|---|
| Conservative | John Wells | 25,079 | 46.9 | −13.6 |
| Labour | James Daly | 17,143 | 32.1 | −4.4 |
| Liberal | Stanley Blow | 11,244 | 21.0 | New |
| Majority | | 7,936 | 14.8 | −6.2 |
| Turnout | | 53,467 | 78.0 | −0.6 |
| Conservative hold | | Swing | | |

General election 1966: Maidstone
| Party | Candidate | Votes | % | ±% |
|---|---|---|---|---|
| Conservative | John Wells | 29,208 | 54.7 | +7.8 |
| Labour | Michael J O'Flaherty | 24,214 | 45.3 | +13.2 |
| Majority | | 4,994 | 9.4 | −5.4 |
| Turnout | | 53,422 | 74.3 | −3.7 |
| Conservative hold | | Swing | | |

=== Elections in the 1970s ===
General election 1970: Maidstone
| Party | Candidate | Votes | % | ±% |
|---|---|---|---|---|
| Conservative | John Wells | 31,316 | 51.4 | −3.3 |
| Labour | Kenneth M Graham | 18,473 | 30.3 | −15.0 |
| Liberal | Stanley Blow | 11,167 | 18.3 | New |
| Majority | | 12,843 | 21.1 | +11.7 |
| Turnout | | 60,959 | 72.1 | −2.2 |
| Conservative hold | | Swing | | |

General election February 1974: Maidstone
| Party | Candidate | Votes | % | ±% |
|---|---|---|---|---|
| Conservative | John Wells | 31,334 | 44.1 | −7.3 |
| Liberal | Edward Harrison | 23,678 | 33.3 | +15.0 |
| Labour | R Arndell | 16,006 | 22.5 | −7.8 |
| Majority | | 7,656 | 10.8 | −10.3 |
| Turnout | | 71,014 | 81.3 | +9.2 |
| Conservative hold | | Swing | | |

General election October 1974: Maidstone
| Party | Candidate | Votes | % | ±% |
|---|---|---|---|---|
| Conservative | John Wells | 28,852 | 44.2 | +0.1 |
| Liberal | Julian F Burnett | 18,581 | 28.5 | −4.8 |
| Labour | Kenneth M Graham | 17,828 | 27.3 | +4.8 |
| Majority | | 10,271 | 15.7 | +4.9 |
| Turnout | | 65,260 | 74.0 | −7.3 |
| Conservative hold | | Swing | | |

General election 1979: Maidstone
| Party | Candidate | Votes | % | ±% |
|---|---|---|---|---|
| Conservative | John Wells | 37,727 | 52.6 | +8.4 |
| Liberal | Julian F Burnett | 16,676 | 23.2 | −5.3 |
| Labour | Richard Evans | 16,632 | 23.2 | −4.1 |
| National Front | Arthur Dennis Whiting | 703 | 1.0 | New |
| Majority | | 21,051 | 29.3 | +13.6 |
| Turnout | | 71,734 | 77.0 | +3.0 |
| Conservative hold | | Swing | | |

=== Elections in the 1980s ===
General election 1983: Maidstone
| Party | Candidate | Votes | % | ±% |
|---|---|---|---|---|
| Conservative | John Wells | 26,420 | 50.9 | −1.7 |
| Alliance | Julian F Burnett | 19,194 | 37.0 | +13.8 |
| Labour | Gordon Carey | 6,280 | 12.1 | −11.1 |
| Majority | | 7,226 | 13.9 | −15.4 |
| Turnout | | 51,895 | 73.8 | −3.2 |
| Conservative hold | | Swing | | |

General election 1987:Maidstone
| Party | Candidate | Votes | % | ±% |
|---|---|---|---|---|
| Conservative | Ann Widdecombe | 29,100 | 52.4 | +1.5 |
| Alliance | Christopher Sutton-Mattocks | 18,736 | 33.8 | −3.2 |
| Labour | Kevin Brooks | 6,935 | 12.5 | +0.4 |
| Green | Penelope Kemp | 717 | 1.3 | New |
| Majority | | 10,364 | 18.6 | +4.7 |
| Turnout | | 55,488 | 76.02 | +2.2 |
| Conservative hold | | Swing | | |

=== Elections in the 1990s ===
General election 1992: Maidstone
| Party | Candidate | Votes | % | ±% |
|---|---|---|---|---|
| Conservative | Ann Widdecombe | 31,611 | 54.2 | +1.8 |
| Liberal Democrats | PG Yates | 15,325 | 26.3 | −7.5 |
| Labour | AFH Logan | 10,517 | 18.0 | +5.5 |
| Green | Penelope Kemp | 707 | 1.2 | −0.1 |
| Natural Law | FJ Ingram | 172 | 0.3 | New |
| Majority | | 16,286 | 27.9 | +9.3 |
| Turnout | | 58,332 | 80.1 | +4.1 |
| Conservative hold | | Swing | +4.6 | |

== See also ==
- List of parliamentary constituencies in Kent

== Sources ==
- Robert Beatson, "A Chronological Register of Both Houses of Parliament" (London: Longman, Hurst, Res & Orme, 1807)
- D. Brunton & D. H. Pennington, Members of the Long Parliament (London: George Allen & Unwin, 1954)
- F W S Craig, "British Parliamentary Election Results 1832-1885" (2nd edition, Aldershot: Parliamentary Research Services, 1989)
- T. H. B. Oldfield, The Representative History of Great Britain and Ireland (London: Baldwin, Cradock & Joy, 1816)
- J Holladay Philbin, Parliamentary Representation 1832 - England and Wales (New Haven: Yale University Press, 1965)
- Edward Porritt and Annie G Porritt, The Unreformed House of Commons (Cambridge University Press, 1903)
- Henry Pelling, Social Geography of British Elections 1885-1910 (London: Macmillan, 1967)
- Robert Waller, The Almanac of British Politics (1st edition, London: Croom Helm, 1983; 5th edition, London: Routledge, 1996)
- Frederic A Youngs, jr, "Guide to the Local Administrative Units of England, Vol I" (London: Royal Historical Society, 1979)
