= Edwin Wyat =

English politician

Edwin Wyat (c. 1629 – 7 December 1714), of Maidstone, Kent, was an English politician.

He was a Member of the Parliament of England for Maidstone in November 1685.
