= Thomas Harlackenden =

English politician (1624–1689)

Thomas Harlackenden (1624–1689), of Maidstone and Woodchurch, Kent, was an English politician.

He was a member (MP) of the parliament of England for Maidstone in 1668.
