= Thomas Fane (died 1692) =

English politician

Thomas Fane (1626–1692), of Burston, Hunton, Kent, was an English politician.

He was a member (MP) of the parliament of England for Maidstone in 1679 and 1681.
