= Thomas Stanley (Maidstone MP) =

English politician

Thomas Stanley (1581–1669), of Hamptons, West Peckham and Earl's Place, Earl's Lane, Maidstone, Kent, was an English politician.

He was a member (MP) of the parliament of England for Maidstone in 1625.
