= Humfrey Tufton =

English politician (1584–1659)

Humfrey Tufton, 1st Baronet (1584 – October 1659) was an English politician who sat in the House of Commons from 1640 to 1648.

Tufton was a son of John Tufton of Hothfield, and brother of Nicholas Tufton, 1st Earl of Thanet. He purchased The Mote near Maidstone.

Humfrey Tufton was involved in a duel with Murray of Prince Charles's bedchamber (a brother of Secretary Murray) in March 1625, after having an argument at a stage play. They went to St George's Fields to fight. Tufton noted the presence of Gibson, a Scottish armourer, although they had agreed not to have "seconds" present. Tufton objected and left the field. The events offended Gibson's sense of honour, and he fought with Murray. Both were fatally injured.

In November 1640, Tufton was elected Member of Parliament for Maidstone in the Long Parliament. He was created a baronet, of The Mote in the County of Kent, on 24 December 1641. He was excluded from parliament under Pride's Purge in 1648. He was appointed High Sheriff of Kent for 1654.

Tufton died at Bobbing Place at the age of 76.

== Family ==
Tufton married Margaret Morley, daughter of Herbert Morley of Glynde, Sussex. He was succeeded in the baronetcy by his son, John. The title became extinct upon the death of the second Baronet in 1685. His daughter Olympia married Sir William Wray of Ashby.

Parliament of England
Preceded by Sir George Fane; Sir Francis Barnham	Member of Parliament for Maidstone; 1640–1648; With: Sir Francis Barnham 1640–1646; Sir Thomas Twisden, 1st Baronet	Succeeded by Not represented in Rump Parliament
Baronetage of England
New creation	Baronet of The Mote; 1641–1659	Succeeded by John Tufton
