= Archibald Clinkard =

English member of parliament

Archibald Clinkard (died 1696), of Sutton Valence, Kent, was an English member of parliament.

He was born the son of Gabriel Clinkard of Westminster.

He was an officer of the Volunteer Horse of Kent from 1660, a commissioner for assessment and a Justice of the Peace. He was appointed High Sheriff of Kent for 1681 to 1684 and a Deputy Lieutenant of Kent for 1682 to 1689.

He was a member (MP) of the parliament of England for Maidstone in 1685.
