= George Simson =

British politician

George Simson (1767–1848), of 36 Portland Place and Whitton Park, Middlesex was a politician.

He was a Member (MP) of the Parliament of the United Kingdom for Maidstone 1806 to 1818.
