= Robert Barnham =

English politician

Sir Robert Barnham, 1st Baronet (12 October 1606 – c. June 1685) of Boughton Monchelsea Place was an English politician who sat in the House of Commons from 1660 to 1679.

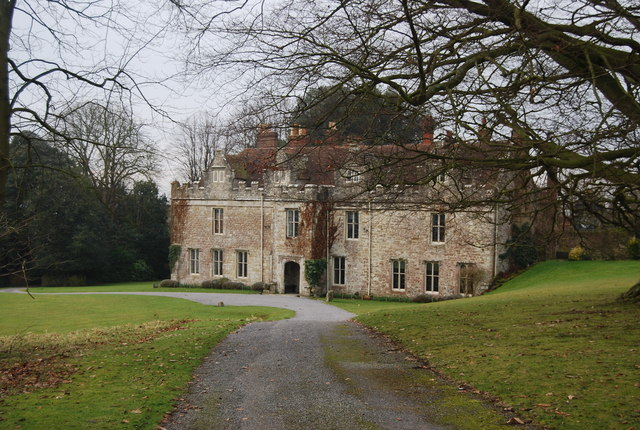
Boughton Monchelsea Place, Kent

Barnham was the son of Sir Francis Barnham and his wife Elizabeth Leonard, daughter of Sampson Leonard of Chevening. His father had been MP for Maidstone.

In 1660, Barnham was elected Member of Parliament for Maidstone in the Convention Parliament. He was re-elected in 1661 for the Cavalier Parliament and sat until 1679. He was created a baronet, of Boughton Monchelsey in the County of Kent, on 14 August 1663.

Barnham married Elizabeth Henley, daughter of Robert Henley. They had several daughters and a son, Francis Barnham, who died in 1668. Barnham died in circa June 1685, aged 78.

According to Burke's Extinct and Dormant Baronetcies (1844), the baronetcy was inherited by Francis Barnham's son, Robert, who died in 1728, the baronetcy then becoming extinct; Cokayne, in his Complete Baronetage (1903), however, notes his existence to be "doubtful", Francis having been understood to have died without male issue.

Boughton Monchelsea passed to Sir Robert's daughter Philadelphia and her husband Thomas Rider.

Baronetage of England
New creation	Baronet (of Boughton Monchelsey); 1663–1685	Extinct
