= George Longman (MP) =

British politician

George Longman (1776–1822), of 22 Bloomsbury Square, Middlesex, was a politician. He was a Member (MP) of the Parliament of the United Kingdom for Maidstone 1806–1812 and 1818–1820.
