= Matthew Bloxam (MP) =

British businessman and politician

Sir Matthew Bloxam (1744 – 16 October 1822), of Highgate, Middlesex, was a British businessman and politician.

He was born the eldest son of the Rev. Matthew Bloxam, vicar of Comberton, Worcestershire. He became a partner in the firm of Foudrinier, Bloxam and Walker, wholesale stationers of Lombard Street, London and in the bank of Sanderson, Harrison, Brenchley, Bloxam and Co. of Southwark. He was elected Sheriff of London for 1787-8 and served as an alderman from 1803 to 1821.

He was a Member (MP) of the Parliament of Great Britain for Maidstone 1788 to 1806.

He was knighted in 1800.
