= Boughton =

Boughton may refer to:

== People ==
- Boughton (surname)
- Boughton Baronets, titled English family line

== Places ==
=== England ===
- Boughton, Cheshire
- Boughton, Norfolk
- Boughton, Northamptonshire that gives it name to:
  - Boughton House, a country house in Northamptonshire
  - Boughton railway station, planned terminus of the Northampton & Lamport Railway
- Boughton, Nottinghamshire
- Boughton Aluph, Kent
- Boughton Green, Kent
- Boughton Lees, Kent
- Boughton Malherbe, Kent
- Boughton Monchelsea, Kent
  - of which Boughton Green is a part
- Boughton Street, Kent
- Boughton under Blean, Kent

=== Wales ===
- Broughton, Vale of Glamorgan
