= Boughton (surname) =

Boughton is a surname. Notable people with the surname include:

- Alice Boughton (1866–1943), American photographer
- Caroline G. Boughton (1854–1905), American educator and social activist
- Chauncey Boughton (1805–1895), American physician and politician
- Clive Boughton (born 1956), Australian computer scientist
- George H. Boughton (1792–1866), American politician
- George Henry Boughton (1833–1905), Anglo-American painter
- Joy Boughton (1913–1963), English oboist and music professor
- Martha Arnold Boughton (1857–1928), American educator, author
- Napoleon Boughton, Commander of the USS Gladiolus during the American Civil War
- Rutland Boughton (1878–1960), English composer
- William Boughton (born 1948), English conductor

== See also ==
- Boughton Baronets, titled English family line
- John Bowton (also John Bouton, John Boughton) (1636–1707), founding settler of Norwalk, Connecticut
