= Oboe Sonata =

Oboe Sonata in general is a sonata composed for oboe, Oboe Sonata may also refer to:

- Oboe Sonata (Howells)
- Oboe Sonata (Poulenc)
- Oboe Sonata (Saint-Saëns)
