= William Sutton (VC) =

English soldier (1830–1888)

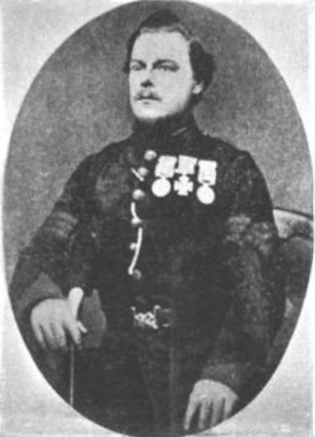
- Born: c. 1830; Ightham, Kent
- Died: 16 February 1888 (aged 57–58); Ightham, Kent
- Burial place: St Peter's Churchyard, Ightham
- Military career
- Allegiance: United Kingdom
- Branch: British Army
- Rank: Bugler
- Units: 60th Rifles
- Conflicts: Crimean War
- Awards: Victoria Cross

William Sutton VC (c. 1830 – 16 February 1888) was an English recipient of the Victoria Cross, the highest and most prestigious award for gallantry in the face of the enemy that can be awarded to British and Commonwealth forces.

== Details ==
Sutton was about 27 years old, and a bugler in the 1st Battalion, 60th Rifles (later The King's Royal Rifle Corps), British Army during the Indian Mutiny when the following deed took place on 13 September 1857 at Delhi, India for which he was awarded the Victoria Cross.

60th Rifles (1st Battalion)

Bugler William Sutton. Date of Act of Bravery, 13th September, 1857

For gallant conduct at Delhi on the 13th of September, 1857, the night previous to the Assault, in volunteering to reconnoitre the breach. This Soldier's conduct was conspicuous throughout the operations, especially on the 2nd of August, 1857, on which occasion, during an attack by the Enemy in force, he rushed forward over the trenches, and killed one of the Enemy's Buglers, who was in the act of sounding. Elected by the Privates of the Regiment.

There is a plaque in his memory in St Peter's Church, Ightham, where he is buried in an unmarked grave.

== The medal ==
His Victoria Cross is displayed at the Royal Green Jackets (Rifles) Museum, Winchester, England.
