= Millicent Silver =

English harpsichordist (1905–1986)

- Born: 17 November 1905
- Origin: London
- Died: 1 May 1986 (aged 80)
- Education: Royal College of Music
- Genres: Baroque music, Classical music
- Occupation: Harpsichordist
- Instruments: Harpsichord, Piano, Violin
- Years active: 1928–1982

Millicent Irene Silver (17 November 1905 – 1 May 1986) was an English harpsichordist, who began her career as a pianist and violinist.

== Early life ==
Born in South London, her father, James Brand Silver, was a violinist and oboist, and had been a boy chorister at St. George's Chapel, Windsor where his singing attracted the attention of Queen Victoria. Her mother Amelia Argyle Silver was a piano teacher. Millicent was the second of four children. Her musical talent was discovered at the age of three, when she imitated her elder brother's practising.

She won a scholarship to the Royal College of Music, where she studied piano and violin equally. She was awarded the Chappell Silver Medal for piano playing and, in 1928, the college's Tagore Gold Medal for the best student of her year. As a violinist she was guided by W. H. "Billy" Reed, leader of the London Symphony Orchestra and friend of Edward Elgar. She earned her first professional fees playing as a violinist in the Hallé Orchestra. As a pianist, she played concertos by Liszt, Brahms's D minor concerto and notably, Beethoven's "Emperor" concerto, which she performed in the first half of a concert conducted by Adrian Boult, and for the second half led the orchestra from the principal violin desk. After graduating, she studied with Tobias Matthay.

She married flautist John Francis in 1932. She taught piano in a girls' school, while her husband got orchestral work in London, and began an early collaboration with Benjamin Britten. His interest in chamber music led him into an exploration of baroque music; he and Millicent became regular broadcasters on BBC radio, together and in larger ensembles. World War II disrupted her career; she returned to teaching and toured widely, playing for the troops.

== Career as a harpsichordist ==
An important point in Millicent Silver's career came at the end of the war, when at Dartington Hall she was persuaded by the conductor Hans Oppenheim to play the continuo in a performance of Purcell's Dido and Aeneas on a harpsichord. Soon after this her future as a harpsichordist was determined, and the London Harpsichord Ensemble, which she formed with her husband and others, gave its first performance in 1945 at one of Dame Myra Hess's lunch-hour concerts at the National Gallery. She acquired a Kirckman harpsichord, which had been rebuilt by the instrument maker Henry Tull, and, with the group, toured widely and became a prolific broadcaster for the BBC. They gave a programme of ten concerts at the 1950 Edinburgh Festival to mark the bicentenary of the death of Johann Sebastian Bach. With the ensemble, she played a regular series concerts at the Royal Festival Hall, during which she always performed a substantial solo item.

There had been a few harpsichord players in Britain before the war, such as Violet Gordon-Woodhouse and members of the Dolmetsch family, but the instrument was established in Britain in the two decades following 1945 by three main players: George Malcolm, Thurston Dart and Millicent herself. She had a 35-year career on the harpsichord during which she played a very wide solo repertory, though never abandoning the revival-type instruments with pedals, 16' stops and piano-type construction popular in the 1950s and 1960s, though later supplanted by the authentic performance movement.

She played most of the keyboard works of Bach, including his concertos, Partitas and English Suites; the Goldberg Variations featured repeatedly in her recital programmes. She also played the works of Carl Philipp Emanuel Bach and Johann Christian Bach, many of Domenico Scarlatti's and Antonio Soler's sonatas, many of the works of François Couperin and Jean-Philippe Rameau, the music of the English virginalists (William Byrd, Orlando Gibbons, John Bull and others), and much 20th century harpsichord music by composers such as Manuel de Falla, Hans Werner Henze and György Ligeti. She gave the first broadcast of Benjamin Britten's Holiday Diary, and Paul Hindemith's Flute Sonata, with John Francis. Walter Leigh, Gordon Jacob and Herbert Howells wrote pieces for her. Henze said that she played the harpsichord part in his Apollo et Hyazinthus better than anyone else.

Her recordings include Scarlatti sonatas; some Baroque chamber music with the London Harpsichord Ensemble; oboe sonatas with her daughter Sarah Francis and the cellist Bernard Richards; and her own arrangement for seven instruments of Bach's The Musical Offering, which was used by the Argentine novelist Julio Cortázar as the framework for his short story Clon. She recorded the Goldberg Variations in the 1950s. That she made few recordings reflects the era in which she lived as well as her dislike of the process itself. She and John Francis made their last appearance together in Bach's Brandenburg Concerto No. 5 in January 1981. She played in public for the last time in 1982, when she accompanied one of her daughters, the soprano Hannah Francis, on the piano in a recital of Russian songs. Her other daughter is the oboist Sarah Francis.

For over 20 years she was a professor of both piano and harpsichord at the Royal College of Music, where she taught harpsichordist Trevor Pinnock (who said of her, "She could make the harpsichord sing, and there's not many can do that [...] Millicent Silver didn't always agree with what I did, but she made sure that I did it well."), organist Christopher Herrick ("[Millicent Silver was] a total Landowska devotee if ever there was one [...] she was such a fine, instinctive musician"), fortepianist Melvyn Tan and Christopher Kite, amongst many others.
