= Boughton Monchelsea =

Village in Kent, England

Coordinates: 51.229260°N 0.531170°E

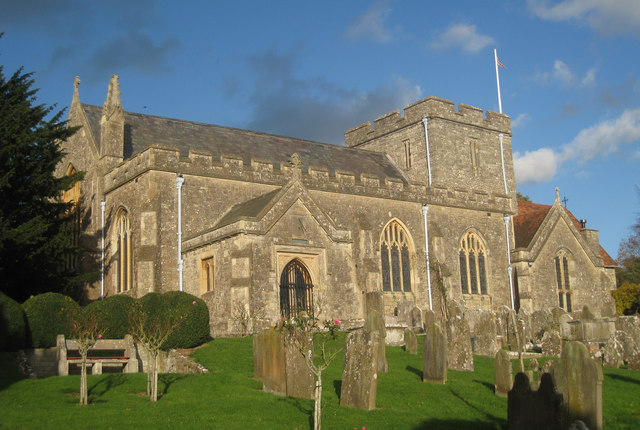
- St Peter's Church

- Location within Kent
- Population: 3,313 (2011 Census)
- District: Maidstone
- Shire county: Kent
- Region: South East
- Country: England
- Sovereign state: United Kingdom
- Post town: Maidstone
- Postcode district: ME17
- Police: Kent
- Fire: Kent
- Ambulance: South East Coast
- UK Parliament: Faversham and Mid Kent

Boughton Monchelsea is a village and civil parish in the borough of Maidstone in Kent, England. The civil parish lies on a ragstone ridge situated between the North Downs and the Weald of Kent and has commonly been called Quarry Hills. The village itself is located 3 miles (5 km) south of the town of Maidstone.

== History ==
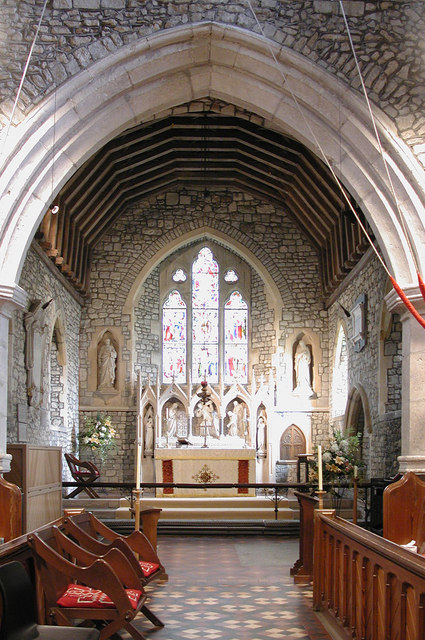
The interior of St Peter's Church

The village name comes from a corruption of the name of the Norman family given the manor after the Conquest: Montchensie who held the manor until 1287 and the Anglo Saxon Boc Tun (Beech Tree settlement). The village is mentioned in the Domesday Book of 1086 as Boltone, then Bouton, Bocton, and probably via Bocton de Montchensie to the current Boughton Monchelsea. The suffix using the family name seems to have been added in this area of Kent, possibly to differentiate multiple Boctuns.

Some of the earliest history of Boughton Monchelsea is in the Iron Age settlement at Quarry Wood Camp (Camp Field). There are traces of an outer rampart on Parsonage Farm (on the edge of Park Wood) constructed by the Belgae about 40 AD, possibly as a defence against the Roman invasion in 43 AD.

The foundations of a Roman bathhouse were discovered in 1841 near Brishing Court, also a Roman villa at Brishing and a cemetery at Lockham. The quarries were worked extensively in Roman times and the villa and bathhouse could well have belonged to the quarry owner. Ragstone (a type of sandstone) was worked here; stone for the building of Westminster Abbey, the present-day Houses of Parliament and the repair of Rochester Castle came from here. The last quarry closed in 1960.

St Peter's Church is located in the village.

== Local amenities ==
The village has a village green, a primary school, a village hall, a recreation ground, one public house and a post office.

The 16th-century Elizabethan stone-built former manor house, Boughton Monchelsea Place, is situated in a private deer park and remains a private dwelling although it is occasionally opened for commercial use as a venue for weddings and business conferences.

A similar property at nearby Wierton Place has in recent years operated as a polo and country club as well as an exclusive out-of-town nightclub. Prior to that it was the official residence of judges when on circuit at Maidstone Crown Court.

Other historic houses include the Grade II listed Tanyard, Brishing Court and Lewis Court.

The Cock Inn, dating back to 1568, is situated at the junction of Heath Road and Brishing Lane. Featured in the classic 1949 film Kind Hearts and Coronets starring Alec Guinness and Dennis Price, The Cock is a typical old English pub featuring inglenooks, exposed beams and low ceilings.

== Notable residents ==
- Sir Anthony St Leger, Master of the Rolls in Ireland, of Wierton House, which he bought from the Norton family, lived here in c. 1610-13.
- Thomas Musgrave Joy, painter, was born here in 1812.
- Benjamin Remington, first-class cricketer
- Michael Remington, first-class cricketer
- William Tomkin (William Stephen Tomkin) was born in the village on 25 November 1860 to farmer William Stephen Tomkin (Snr) and Elizabeth Harrison.
- Fergus and Judith Wilson, controversial buy-to-let property owners.

== Business ==
The kit car manufacturer GKD Sports Cars is based in Boughton Monchelsea with its workshops in nearby Lenham.

== See also ==
- Listed buildings in Boughton Monchelsea
