= Sarah Francis =

British oboist (born 1938)

Sarah Janet Francis (11 January 1938 - 17 November 2026) was a British oboist known for her "refined" chamber music work. She specialised in composers of the 20th century, and gave the premiere of British works including Gordon Crosse's Ariadne (1972) and Herbert Howells's Oboe Sonata (1984), as well as the first British performances of several other contemporary works for the oboe. She was a prolific exponent of Baroque composers such as Telemann and rarely heard early-19th-century repertoire. Her teachers included Terence MacDonagh at the Royal College of Music and Pierre Pierlot in Paris. She was the principal oboist of the BBC Welsh Orchestra (1961–63) and directed the London Harpsichord Ensemble from 1981. She was made an honorary fellow of the Royal College of Music (2001) where she was professor of oboe (from 1974). Francis was also a former chair of the British Double Reed Society.

== Biography ==
Francis was born in London in 1938 to Millicent Silver and John Francis. Both her parents were musicians, her mother a pianist and harpsichordist and her father a flautist; they founded the London Harpsichord Ensemble together in 1945. Her sister, Hannah Francis, is a soprano and harpist. Sarah Francis attended the Royal College of Music, where her teachers included Terence MacDonagh; she won the college's Somervell Prize for wind instruments (1959). In 1960 she gained a Boise Foundation scholarship, assisting her to go to Paris, where she was taught by Pierre Pierlot.

She joined the BBC Welsh Orchestra, where she was the principal oboist (1961–63). She then pursued a career as a chamber musician. She performed with two family chamber groups, the Sylvan Trio for flute, oboe and harpsichord/piano, and Symphonia Emphylios for the unusual combination of flute, oboe, harp and harpsichord, as well as the London Harpsichord Ensemble, which she has directed since her parents' retirement in 1981.

Francis taught at the Royal College of Music, where she was professor of oboe from 1974; she became an honorary fellow of the college in 2001. She served as chair of the British Double Reed Society (1996). She was married to Michael Johnson until her death in 2026.

== Repertoire and reception ==
She gave the premiere of Ariadne by Gordon Crosse, a concertante for oboe and twelve other instruments commissioned for her, in July 1972 at the Cheltenham Music Festival, with the Contrapuncti Chamber Ensemble directed by Michael Lankester, in a performance described by Gerald Larner in The Musical Times as "thrilling". She reprised the work at the Proms in 1974; Joan Chissell, in a Times review of the later performance, criticised Francis's tone as "small", noting that the sound did not carry adequately in the large space of the Royal Albert Hall, but considers her phrasing sufficiently expressive to do justice to the composer's "sensitive imagination", praising the "hypnotic ending, beautifully dissolving into sleep and silence".

At the Cheltenham Festival in 1980, she gave the first performance of Anthony Payne's Song of the Clouds with the Orchestra of St John, Smith Square conducted by John Lubbock, and also gave the work's first broadcast in 1983 with the City of London Sinfonia under Richard Hickox. In 1984, again at the Cheltenham Festival, Francis premiered Peter Dickinson's Four Duos for oboe and piano with the composer; at the same festival she also gave a posthumous first performance of Herbert Howells's Oboe Sonata with Dickinson. She also gave the first British performances of several works including the Oboe Sonata by Charles Koechlin in 1974, and Samuel Barber's Canzonetta for oboe and strings, both in piano reduction with Dickinson early in 1982, and a few months later, the orchestrated version with the Academy of London, conducted by Richard Stamp.

A reviewer in The Times praised her performance of Britten's Six Metamorphoses after Ovid for unaccompanied oboe in 1963 at the Wigmore Hall in London, writing that her technique was adequate for the work's "ruthless test", although some of the score's detail was lost, and praising her rendition of the "languorous" Narcissus and her "judicious" use of vibrato throughout the concert.

Unusual older works that she performed include the astronomer William Herschel's Oboe Concerto.

== Recordings ==
Many of Francis's recordings are of 20th-century British music. She recorded Britten's Six Metamorphoses after Ovid, in what Geoffrey Burgess (in her Grove Music Online entry) refers to as the work's "first commercial recording". She made the first recordings of Lennox Berkeley's Trio for flute–piccolo, oboe–English horn and piano, and Suite for flute, oboe and string trio, paired with his Sonatina for oboe and piano (Op. 61) and Oboe Quartet (Op. 70), with the Tagore Trio, Michael Dussek and Judith Fitton, in a recording criticised by Gil French in American Record Guide, who describes the oboe as "whiny, with bad pitch". She has recorded Crosse's Ariadne with the London Symphony Orchestra conducted by Norman Del Mar. Francis also recorded works by other 20th-century British composers, including two quartets for oboe and strings by Rutland Boughton with the Rasumovsky Quartet; William Alwyn's Oboe Sonata with Sophia Rahman; and Howells's Oboe Sonata with Peter Dickinson. Steven E. Ritter, in a review of the Howells for American Record Guide, writes that Francis shows "fluent technical ability" but criticises her for occasional "nasal and constricted tone", "flaccid rhythmical projection" and "uneven trilling". She also recorded the Oboe Quintet by Arnold Bax, Fantasy Quartet by E. J. Moeran, Oboe Quartet by Gordon Jacob, and the Air and Variations and Three Pieces (Op. 2) by Gustav Holst, with the English String Quartet; Robert Anderson, in a review for The Musical Times, described her as an "accomplished protagonist, weaving in and out of the subtle textures with effortless skill".

She recorded Oboe Quintets by the composers Bernhard Crusell, Rodolphe Kreutzer and Anton Reicha, all writing in the late-18th and early-19th centuries, with the Allegri Quartet. Jay Harvey, in a review for the Indianapolis Star, described Francis as having an "astonishing fullness of tone" even in rapid passages, while Ritter, in a review for American Record Guide, describes her as "fine oboist" who is "technically secure" although sometimes "a little stressed in tone". Other recordings of music from a similar era include two concertos by Franz Krommer and Mozart's Oboe Concerto in C major, with the London Mozart Players conducted by Howard Shelley, and six Quintets for oboe and strings (Op. 45) by Boccherini, with the Allegri Quartet; Anderson, reviewing the Boccherini for The Musical Times, described her as playing "tenderly and expressively".

In Baroque repertoire she has recorded all of Telemann's concertos for oboe and oboe d'amore with the London Harpsichord Ensemble, as well as other works by the composer such as selections from his oboe sonatas with Jane Dodd, and with Robert Jordan. Nicholas Anderson, in a review of the first volume of concertos for Gramophone, writes that he enjoys "her rapport with dance measures, her clear articulation, her well-controlled vibrato and her ability to shape phrases gracefully", and compares her tone with Renato Zanfini, an earlier Italian oboist. She also recorded oboe concertos by Albinoni (Op. 7 and Op. 9).
