= William Tomkin =

English painter

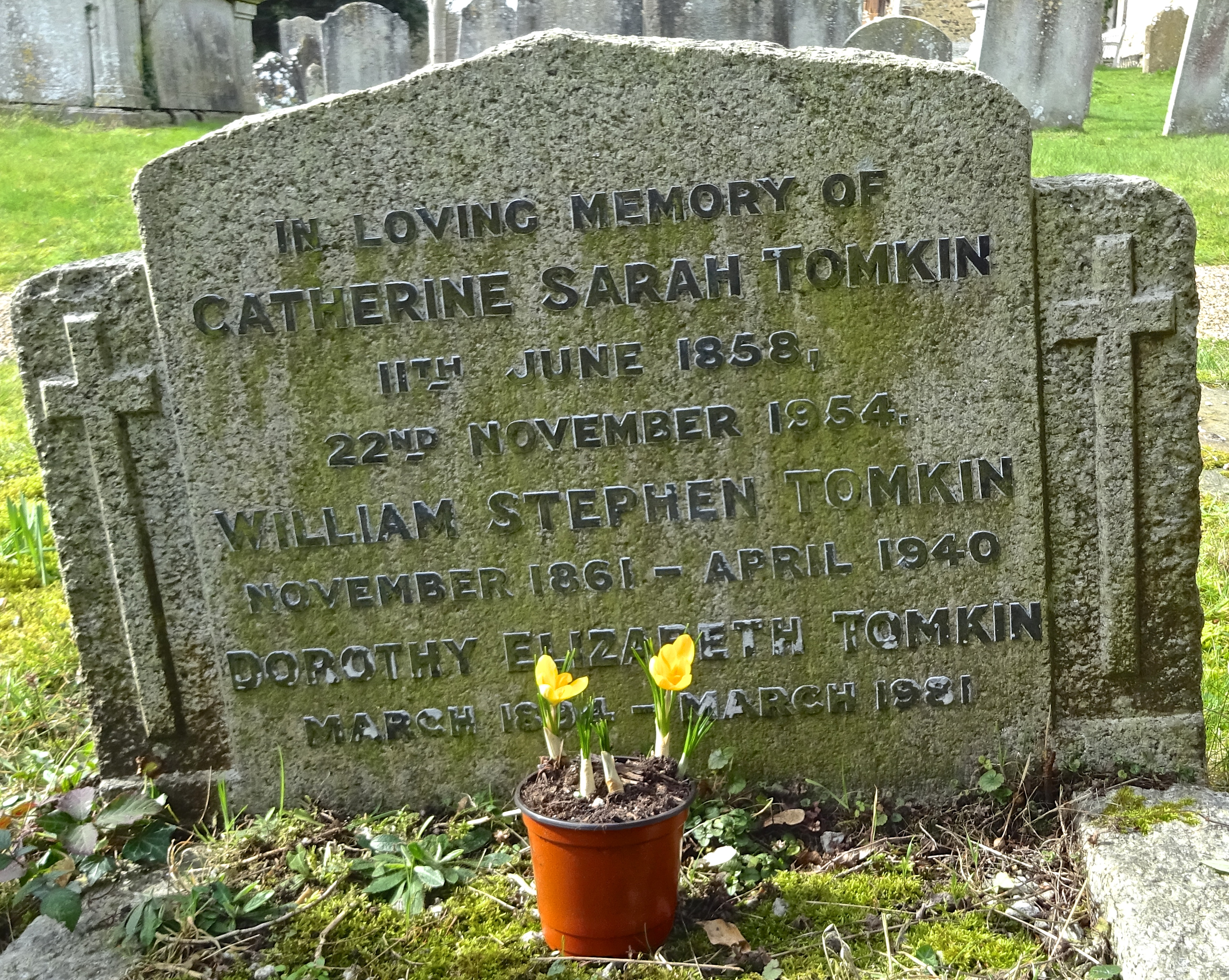
William Stephen Tomkin is buried at Ightham, Kent, England

William Stephen Tomkin (25 November 1860 – 7 April 1940) was born at Park Road in the village of Boughton Monchelsea, which lies on a ragstone ridge between the North Downs and the Weald of Kent, a few miles south of Maidstone.

There is a degree of conflict in William's birth date. His Birth Certificate clearly records this as being 25 November 1860 and registered on 5 January 1861. However, the family gravestone (photo) shows November 1861 - April 1940.

By 1871, the family had relocated some 20 km (12 miles) north-westwards to the cluster of villages that comprises Ightham, Borough Green and Wrotham. He was a watercolour artist, draughtsman, and assistant to General Augustus Pitt Rivers between 1882-1890.

He was the first child of farmer William Stephen Tomkin (Snr) and Elizabeth his wife, who had married at St. Mary’s Church, Woolwich, in April 1859.

Elizabeth Tomkin was the elder sister of Benjamin Harrison (1837-1921) who had inherited a grocery/drapery store in the nearby village of Ightham from his father. Apart from being a village shopkeeper, Benjamin Harrison won international recognition as a pioneer in archaeology. He maintained that the many flints – "eoliths" – which he found in the pre-glacial drift on the North Down were artefacts that challenged current beliefs about the antiquity of man.

Spending the greater part of his spare time on this amateur hobby, there is little doubt that Harrison would have been influential in the development of his young nephew William Tomkin; living quite close to each other at this time. It is also conceivable that one of Harrison’s many contacts led to the young Tomkin being introduced to General Augustus Pitt Rivers. One possible link would be the renowned geologist Professor (knighted in 1896) Joseph Prestwich, whom Harrison first met in the summer of 1879. They became regular correspondents, and met quite often, either at the Professor’s home in Shoreham or on Prestwich’s visits to Ightham – which are just 13 km (8 miles) apart. Prestwich also moved in the same intellectual circles as General Pitt Rivers.

In September 1891, W. S. Tomkin married Catherine Sarah Rattenbury. Originally from Devon, her family had settled in Edmonton, Middlesex where she was born. However, in 1881 she was living as a boarder, above a watchmaker’s shop, and employed as a village schoolmistress teaching children from Borough Green/Wrotham. She continued in this role until the spring of 1891. It was during this decade that Tomkin was employed by Pitt Rivers.

By November 1890, Tomkin had ended his employment with Pitt Rivers and it is believed to be for financial reasons. His next employment was with Waterlow & Sons, a major worldwide engraver of currency, postage stamps, stocks and bond certificates based in London, Watford and Dunstable in England. That company was founded as a family business in 1810.

On Census night, April 1891, Tomkin is shown to be living as a boarder at Grosvenor Road, Islington.

Apart from his commercial work, Tomkin continued to be a prolific watercolour artist – a highly proficient painter of maritime subjects – exhibiting one, Wind Against the Tide at the Royal Academy in 1909.

In 1916, he recorded the shooting down of a German SL11 airship during a bombing raid, which crashed in flames at Cuffley, Hertfordshire on the night of 2/3 September; the first to do so on British soil. Lieutenant W. Leefe Robinson of the Worcestershire Regiment & Royal Flying Corps, was awarded the Victoria Cross.

The night scene, captured by Tomkin from his Walthamstow garden, contains a scrap from the wreckage and is now held at the RAF Museum, Hendon, near to Cuffley.

William Stephen Tomkin died on 7 April 1940 at Chingford, Essex.

He is buried, with other family members, in the churchyard of St Peter's at Ightham, Kent.

His wife, Catherine Sarah Tomkin, died in 1954. Tomkin had three daughters who survived him. Dorothy, Janet, and Kate. Twin boys, the couple's first children, died shortly after their birth in 1892.

Small collections that include watercolours, sketchbooks and personal effects are held in General Pitt Rivers’ archives at The Salisbury Museum, Wiltshire, England and the Pitt Rivers museum in Oxford, England.
