= St Peter's Church, Boughton Monchelsea =

Parish church in Kent, England

Coordinates: 51.22079°N 0.53490°E

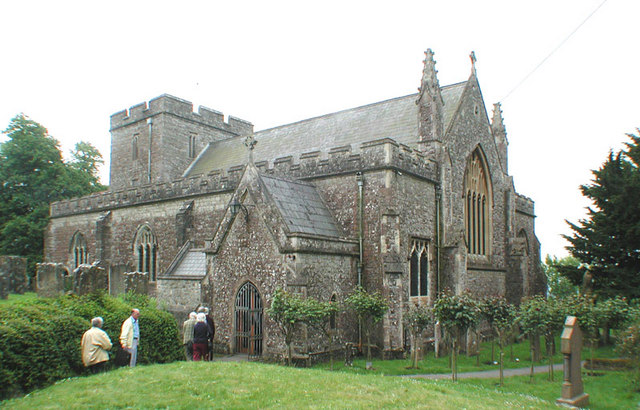

- Location within Kent
- OS grid reference: TQ 77115 49895
- Location: Boughton Monchelsea, Kent
- Country: England
- Denomination: Anglican
- Website: stpeters-church.org.uk

History
- Status: Parish church

Architecture
- Functional status: Active
- Heritage designation: Grade II*
- Designated: 25 March 1987
- Completed: 1100

Administration
- Province: Canterbury
- Diocese: Canterbury
- Archdeaconry: Maidstone
- Deanery: North Downs
- Parish: Boughton Monchelsea

St Peter's Church is a parish church in Boughton Monchelsea, Kent. It is a Grade II* listed building.

== Building ==
The church is mostly built of ragstone.

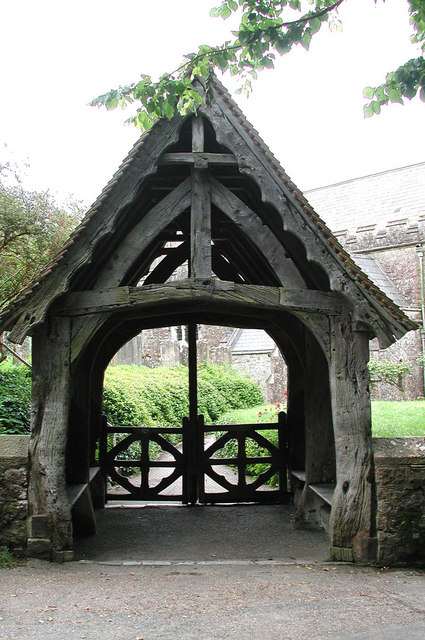
The Grade II* listed lychgate

The lychgate in the churchyard dates from 1470, and is Grade II* listed independently of the church.

== History ==
St Peter's Church was damaged by fire in 1832.

== See also ==
- Boughton Monchelsea
