= Noel Stansfeld =

Canadian flying ace of WWII

- Born: 25 February 1915; Edmonton, Alberta, Canada
- Died: 1995 (aged 79–80); British Columbia, Canada
- Military career
- Allegiance: Canada
- Branch: Royal Air Force (1938–1945); Royal Canadian Air Force (1945–1948)
- Rank: Squadron Leader
- Units: No. 242 Squadron; No. 426 Squadron; No. 436 Squadron
- Conflicts: Second World War: Battle of France; Battle of Britain
- Awards: Distinguished Flying Cross

Noel Stansfeld, DFC (25 February 1915 – 1995) was a Canadian flying ace of the Royal Air Force (RAF) during the Second World War. He was credited with the destruction of at least seven aircraft.

From Alberta, Stansfeld joined the RAF on a short service commission in 1938. Once his training was completed, he was posted to No. 242 Squadron. He flew Hawker Hurricane fighters during the Battle of France, claiming his first aerial victories, then in the subsequent Battle of Britain. Wounded when he was shot down in later September 1940, he was awarded the Distinguished Flying Cross the following month. The majority of the remainder of his war service was spent as an instructor and as a pilot in transport squadrons. He transferred to the Royal Canadian Air Force (RCAF) before the end of the war and remained in the service after the cessation of hostilities. Invalided out of the RCAF in 1948, he worked for British Columbia's Attorney-general's Department in civilian life. He died in 1995.

== Early life ==
Noel Karl Stansfeld was born on 25 February 1915 in Edmonton, Alberta, in Canada. Once his schooling was completed, he worked as a broker in the Vancouver Stock Exchange. In May 1939, having travelled to the United Kingdom, he applied to the Royal Air Force for a short-service commission. He was granted his commission on 24 June, with the rank of acting pilot officer and for a term of four years. Having undergone initial flight instruction at No. 3 Elementary & Reserve Flying Training School at Brough, he proceed to No. 8 Flying Training School at Montrose.

== Second World War ==
Shortly after the outbreak of the Second World War, Stansfeld completed his flying training and was sent to No. 12 Group Pool for posting to a fighter squadron. After a period of familiarisation on the Hawker Hurricane fighter, he was assigned to No. 242 Squadron in late January 1940. In the process of being equipped with Hurricanes, his unit was based at Church Fenton and its flying personnel were mostly Canadians serving in the RAF. In April Stansfeld was attached to No. 85 Squadron, which was operating Hurricanes in France, but returned to his former unit after a few weeks.

=== Battle of France ===
In May, No. 242 Squadron began flying patrols from Biggin Hill to northern France as the fighting there escalated after the Germans invaded the country. Then in mid-May, it moved to France to support the operations of the British Expeditionary Force (BEF). On 22 May Stansfeld shared in the destruction of a Henschel Hs 126 reconnaissance aircraft near Doullens. Then on 31 May, as the squadron was drawn in the aerial fighting over the beaches at Dunkirk from where the BEF was being evacuated, he shot down a Messerschmitt Bf 110 heavy fighter. The next day, he destroyed a Junkers Ju 87 dive bomber to the north of Dunkirk but this was not confirmed.

With much of the BEF evacuated from Dunkirk, the remnants withdrew to the Atlantic coast, with No. 242 Squadron still providing aerial cover. There much confusion as the squadron retreated, and on one occasion, 14 June, Stansfeld became lost after an engagement during a patrol along the Seine. Landing near the village of Blain, he received directions from the villagers to a French airfield where he was able to refuel before making his way back to British lines. He crashed his Hurricane while landing near railway lines having again gotten lost but was collected by nearby British troops and returned to the squadron the next day, which was near Nantes. On its last day in France before returning to the United Kingdom, 18 June, Stansfeld destroyed a Heinkel He 111 medium bomber.

=== Battle of Britain ===
After its campaign in France, No. 242 Squadron began rebuilding at Coltishall, being deemed operational on 9 July. However, being part of No. 12 Group, it saw relatively little action even once it moved to Duxford in August. For much of that month, Stansfeld was on a course at the School of Air Navigation at St. Athan. Completing the course on 25 August, he then returned to the squadron. On 30 August, when No. 242 Squadron first saw action, Stansfeld shared in the destruction of a He 111 to the west of Enfield. A week later, he destroyed a Dornier Do 17 medium bomber over North Weald. On 15 September, now known as Battle of Britain Day, he shot down another Do 17 to the south of London and a He 111 near Maidstone. He probably destroyed a Junkers Ju 88 medium bomber south of Canterbury on 27 September. Two days later, he was posted to No. 229 Squadron.

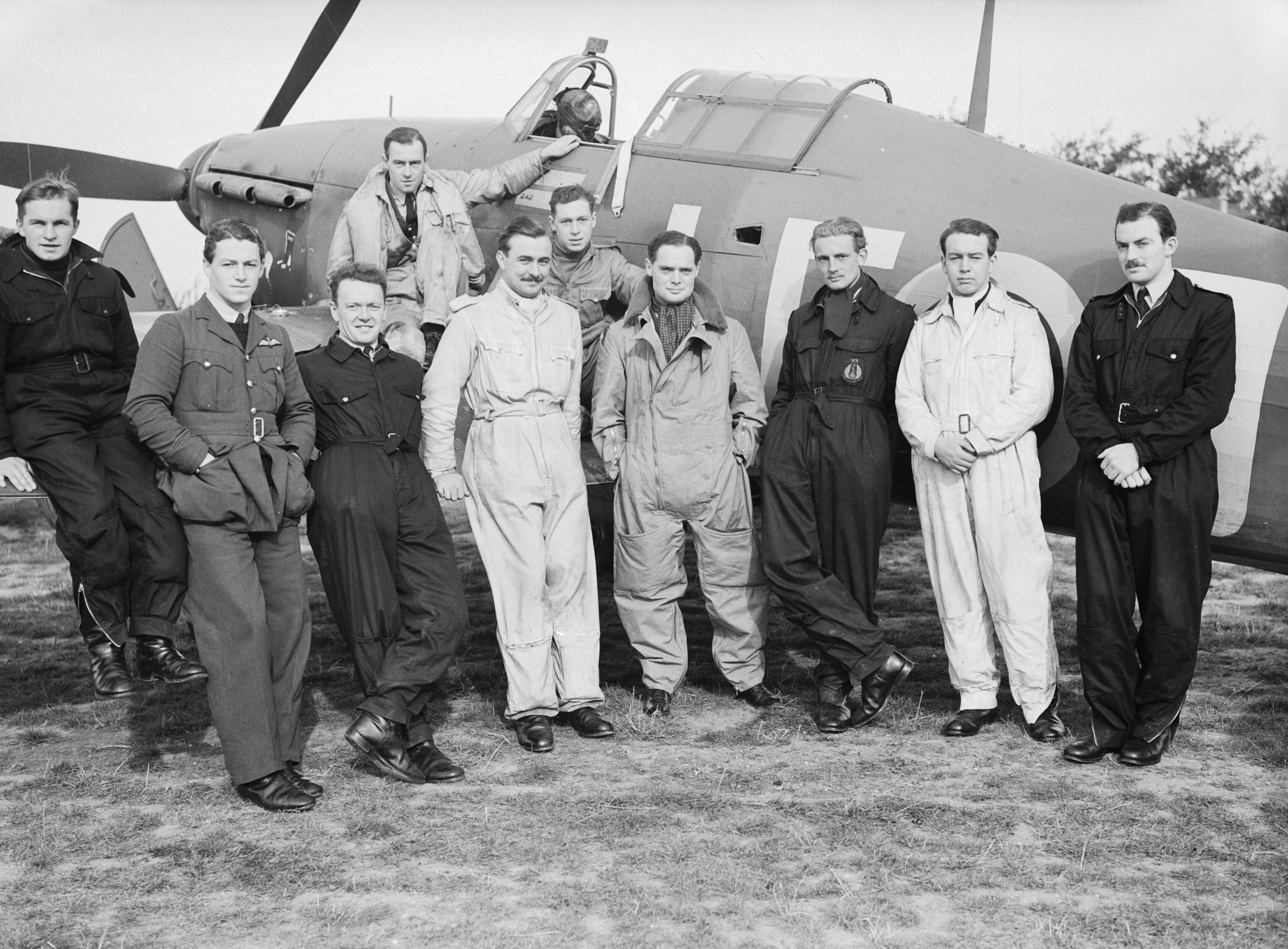
Pilots of No. 242 Squadron, September 1940

Another Hurricane-equipped unit, No. 229 Squadron was based at Northolt. On 30 September, having only just arrived at the squadron, Stansfeld was shot down near Edenbridge in an engagement with Bf 109s. Wounded, he baled out of his Hurricane which subsequently crashed near Ightham. His wounds required hospitalisation for several weeks. In the meantime, on 8 October it was formally announced that Stansfeld was to be awarded the Distinguished Flying Cross (DFC) for his exploits of the previous weeks. The citation for the DFC was published in The London Gazette and read:

This officer has destroyed seven enemy aircraft during engagements over Dunkirk and England. He has exhibited excellent fighting qualities, initiative and marked powers of leadership.

— London Gazette, No. 34964, 8 October 1940

=== Later war service ===
At the end of the year Stansfeld was promoted to flying officer. The next month, having recovered from his wounds, he was repatriated to Canada. For the next two years he performed instructing duties, firstly at No. 34 Service Flying Training School at Medicine Hat and then at No. 32 Operational Training School at Patricia Bay. A report from a senior officer during this period noted that he deemed Stansfeld "suited to training duties". In late 1943, Stansfeld, who had by this time been promoted to flight lieutenant, returned to the United Kingdom.

Stansfeld attended No. 2 Flying Instructors School at Montrose and then served as an instructor at the Advanced Flying Unit for pilots at Kidlington. In February 1945, he was transferred to the Royal Canadian Air Force (RCAF). He was posted to No. 426 Squadron, which was a transport unit based in India. He served with this squadron and then No. 436 Squadron, transporting military personnel around the Far East, until early 1946.

== Postwar career ==
Stansfeld remained in the RCAF in the postwar period but at some stage developed tuberculosis. He was medically released from the RCAF as a squadron leader in late 1948. Returning to civilian life, he was subsequently employed in the attorney-general's Department in British Columbia. In 1970, the excavation of the wreckage of Stansfeld's Hurricane that had crashed at Ightham was filmed for the ITV's Magpie television series. Stansfeld was flown to London for the show and was presented with the gunsight that had been recovered from his aircraft. In his retirement years, he continued to live in British Columbia until his death in 1995.

Stansfeld is credited with the destruction of seven aircraft, two of which shared with other pilots, plus one further destroyed aircraft that could not be confirmed. He is also credited with one aircraft probably destroyed.
