= Listed buildings in Boughton Monchelsea =

Civil Parish in Kent, England

Boughton Monchelsea is a village and civil parish in the Borough of Maidstone of Kent, England It contains one grade I, seven grade II* and 69 grade II listed buildings that are recorded in the National Heritage List for England.

This list is based on the information retrieved online from Historic England.

== Key ==
Grade	Criteria
I	Buildings that are of exceptional interest
II*	Particularly important buildings of more than special interest
II	Buildings that are of special interest

== Listing ==
Name	Grade	Location	Type	Completed (Note: The date given is the date used by Historic England as significant for the initial building or that of an important part in the structure's description.)	Date designated	Grid ref. (Note: The grid reference is based on the British national grid reference system, sometimes known as OSGB36, used by the Ordnance Survey.) Geo-coordinates	Notes	Entry number (Note: The "List Entry Number" is a unique number assigned to each listed building and scheduled monument by Historic England.)	Image	Wikidata
Boughton Monchelsea Place, and Courtyard Buildings	I	Church Hill			25 July 1952	TQ7716349982; 51°13′18″N 0°32′08″E		1060787	Boughton Monchelsea Place, and Courtyard Buildings More images	Q4949433
Beresfords, and Gatepiers Attached and Gatepiers Attached	II	Beresfords Hill			25 March 1987	TQ7690651502; 51°14′07″N 0°31′58″E		1060782	Upload Photo	Q26313947
Rock Cottage	II*	Atkins Hill			23 May 1967	TQ7686651889; 51°14′20″N 0°31′56″E		1344353	Upload Photo	Q17545395
Harts House	II*	Beresfords Hill			25 July 1952	TQ7685151851; 51°14′18″N 0°31′55″E		1060784	Upload Photo	Q17545002
Swiss Cottage	II	Beresfords Hill			23 May 1967	TQ7690451842; 51°14′18″N 0°31′58″E		1344354	Upload Photo	Q26628085
The Malt House	II	Beresfords Hill			14 November 1983	TQ7691251807; 51°14′17″N 0°31′58″E		1060783	Upload Photo	Q26313948
1-11, the Quarries	II	1-11, Bottlescrew Hill			22 June 1977	TQ7697751721; 51°14′14″N 0°32′02″E		1060733	Upload Photo	Q26313904
Folly in the Grounds of Boughton Mount	II	Boughton Mount, Boughton Lane, Maidstone ME17 4NA			4 April 2013	TQ7692652209; 51°14′30″N 0°32′00″E		1413737	Upload Photo	Q26676358
Ha Ha with Footbridge in the Grounds of Boughton Mount	II	Boughton Mount, Boughton Lane, Maidstone ME17 4NA			4 April 2013	TQ7696852180; 51°14′29″N 0°32′02″E		1413736	Upload Photo	Q26676357
Barn About 25 Metres South West of Brishing Court	II	Brishing Lane			25 March 1987	TQ7778251415; 51°14′03″N 0°32′43″E		1060785	Upload Photo	Q26313949
Brishing Court	II*	Brishing Lane			25 July 1952	TQ7778551451; 51°14′04″N 0°32′43″E		1344355	Upload Photo	Q17545400
Archway About 10 Metres South of West End of Boughton Monchelsea Place	II	Church Hill			23 May 1967	TQ7712749934; 51°13′16″N 0°32′06″E		1060753	Upload Photo	Q96278321
Barn About 15 Metres South West of Boughton Monchelsea Place	II	Church Hill			27 July 1952	TQ7710649948; 51°13′17″N 0°32′05″E		1060752	Upload Photo	Q96278327
Church Farm Barn	II	Church Hill			25 March 1987	TQ7692749528; 51°13′03″N 0°31′55″E		1060760	Upload Photo	Q26313927
Church Farm House	II	Church Hill			23 May 1967	TQ7696149558; 51°13′04″N 0°31′57″E		1356183	Upload Photo	Q26638873
Church of St Peter	II*	Church Hill			25 March 1987	TQ7711549895; 51°13′15″N 0°32′06″E		1060754	Church of St Peter More images	Q17544987
Group of 3 Monuments About 13 Metres North East of Chancel of Church of St Peter	II	Church Hill			25 March 1987	TQ7714849909; 51°13′15″N 0°32′07″E		1060755	Upload Photo	Q26313922
Group of 3 Monuments to South of Porch of Church of St Peter	II	Church Hill			25 March 1987	TQ7710549875; 51°13′14″N 0°32′05″E		1060759	Upload Photo	Q26313926
Lychgate	II*	Church Hill			25 July 1952	TQ7709449920; 51°13′16″N 0°32′05″E		1068606	Lychgate More images	Q17545077
Monument to Edward Emiot About 5 1/2 Metres East of North East Corner of Chancel of Church of St Peter	II	Church Hill			25 March 1987	TQ7714849899; 51°13′15″N 0°32′07″E		1060756	Upload Photo	Q26313923
Monument to Members of the Joy Family About 11 Metres South of South Transept of Church of St Peter	II	Church Hill, ME17 4BU			25 March 1987	TQ7712049859; 51°13′14″N 0°32′06″E		1060757	Upload Photo	Q26313924
Monument to Sidragh Fowler About 1/2 Metre South of East End of South Aisle	II	Church Hill			25 March 1987	TQ7711849885; 51°13′14″N 0°32′06″E		1344378	Upload Photo	Q26628106
Monument to Thomas Maddox About 4 Metres South of Chancel of Chancel of Church of St Peter	II	Church Hill			25 March 1987	TQ7713449888; 51°13′15″N 0°32′07″E		1344379	Upload Photo	Q26628107
Monument to William Reiffgens About 9 Metres North of North Porch of Church of St Peter	II	Church Hill			25 March 1987	TQ7710649921; 51°13′16″N 0°32′05″E		1060758	Upload Photo	Q26313925
Monument to William Wedd About 11 Metres South of South Aisle of Church of St Peter	II	Church Hill, ME17 4BU			25 March 1987	TQ7710949864; 51°13′14″N 0°32′05″E		1068599	Upload Photo	Q26321300
Mounting Block About 6 Metres West of Lychgate	II	Church Hill			25 March 1987	TQ7708449924; 51°13′16″N 0°32′04″E		1344380	Upload Photo	Q26628108
Mounting Block in Front of East Elevation of Boughton Monchelsea House	II	Church Hill			25 September 1990	TQ7717349985; 51°13′18″N 0°32′09″E		1060702	Upload Photo	Q96278325
Sundial About 8 Metres South of Boughton Monchelsea Place	II	Church Hill			25 March 1987	TQ7715649956; 51°13′17″N 0°32′08″E		1344376	Upload Photo	Q96278320
The Rider Mausoleum	II	Church Hill			23 May 1967	TQ7715149915; 51°13′15″N 0°32′07″E		1344377	Upload Photo	Q26628105
Mounting Block Immediately West of No 63	II	Church Street			11 August 1988	TQ7689650961; 51°13′50″N 0°31′56″E		1261039	Upload Photo	Q26552018
Cliff Cottages Cliff House	II	1, Cliff Hill			25 March 1987	TQ7742651756; 51°14′15″N 0°32′25″E		1068615	Upload Photo	Q26321315
Gladstones	II	Cliff Hill			25 March 1987	TQ7752351643; 51°14′11″N 0°32′30″E		1060735	Upload Photo	Q26313906
Barn About 56 Metres West of East Hall	II	East Hall Hill			25 March 1987	TQ7829449583; 51°13′03″N 0°33′06″E		1060764	Upload Photo	Q26313931
Barn About 70 Metres West North West of East Hall	II	East Hall Hill			25 March 1987	TQ7828949616; 51°13′04″N 0°33′06″E		1068725	Upload Photo	Q26321420
East Hall	II	East Hall Hill			23 May 1967	TQ7834849582; 51°13′03″N 0°33′08″E		1344383	Upload Photo	Q26628111
Garden Gateway About 20 Metres East of East Hall	II	East Hall Hill			23 May 1967	TQ7837749578; 51°13′03″N 0°33′10″E		1068702	Upload Photo	Q26321399
Wierton Hall	II	East Hall Hill			25 March 1987	TQ7843149909; 51°13′14″N 0°33′13″E		1068693	Upload Photo	Q26321390
Wierton Hall Farm Cottage	II	East Hall Hill			25 March 1987	TQ7838549912; 51°13′14″N 0°33′11″E		1060737	Upload Photo	Q26313908
Laburnum Cottage	II	Green Lane			23 May 1967	TQ7688351269; 51°13′59″N 0°31′56″E		1060767	Upload Photo	Q26313934
Lewis Court	II	Green Lane			25 July 1952	TQ7702251217; 51°13′58″N 0°32′03″E		1060768	Upload Photo	Q26313935
Tudor Cottage	II	Green Lane			25 March 1987	TQ7706051225; 51°13′58″N 0°32′05″E		1068776	Upload Photo	Q26321470
White Cottage	II	Green Lane			23 May 1967	TQ7699251212; 51°13′58″N 0°32′02″E		1068768	Upload Photo	Q26321462
Old Cottage	II	Haste Hill Road			25 April 1974	TQ7676451281; 51°14′00″N 0°31′50″E		1060765	Upload Photo	Q26313932
Iden Farm	II	Heath Road, Cock Street			25 March 1987	TQ7817350871; 51°13′45″N 0°33′02″E		1344382	Upload Photo	Q26628110
Iden Farmhouse	II	Heath Road, Cock Street			23 May 1967	TQ7802450834; 51°13′44″N 0°32′54″E		1068664	Upload Photo	Q26321362
Mounting Block About 5 Metres South West of Tilts House	II	Heath Road, Cock Street			25 March 1987	TQ7790050816; 51°13′44″N 0°32′48″E		1060762	Upload Photo	Q26313929
Parsonage Farmhouse	II	Heath Road, Cock Street			25 March 1987	TQ7738550570; 51°13′36″N 0°32′21″E		1060763	Upload Photo	Q26313930
Railings About 3 Metres South of Tilts House	II	Heath Road, Cock Street			25 March 1987	TQ7791250817; 51°13′44″N 0°32′48″E		1068658	Upload Photo	Q26321357
Swallows	II	Heath Road, Cock Street			23 May 1967	TQ7766450862; 51°13′45″N 0°32′36″E		1068636	Upload Photo	Q26321337
The Cock Inn	II	Heath Road			23 May 1967	TQ7763550863; 51°13′46″N 0°32′34″E		1344381	The Cock Inn More images	Q26628109
Tilts House	II	Heath Road, Cock Street			23 May 1967	TQ7791250831; 51°13′44″N 0°32′48″E		1060761	Upload Photo	Q26313928
Charlton Farmhouse	II	Lower Farm Road			23 May 1967	TQ7793148004; 51°12′13″N 0°32′44″E		1060769	Upload Photo	Q26313936
Holbrook	II	Lower Farm Road			25 March 1987	TQ7834447770; 51°12′05″N 0°33′05″E		1068785	Upload Photo	Q26321480
Rabbit's Cross Farmhouse	II*	Lower Farm Road			23 May 1967	TQ7851447381; 51°11′52″N 0°33′13″E		1060770	Rabbit's Cross Farmhouse More images	Q17544992
Elm House and Railings Attached	II*	Old Tree Lane			23 May 1967	TQ7742051149; 51°13′55″N 0°32′23″E		1068795	Upload Photo	Q17545084
Mounting Block About 6 Metres South of Elm House	II	Old Tree Lane			25 September 1990	TQ7743651151; 51°13′55″N 0°32′24″E		1261053	Upload Photo	Q26552032
3, Park Lane	II	3, Park Lane			11 January 1990	TQ7762650778; 51°13′43″N 0°32′33″E		1060701	Upload Photo	Q26313875
Martins Farmhouse	II	1 and 2, Park Lane, Cock Street			25 July 1952	TQ7761950803; 51°13′44″N 0°32′33″E		1356172	Upload Photo	Q26638864
Bishops Farm House	II	Peens Lane			23 May 1967	TQ7751848845; 51°12′40″N 0°32′24″E		1051669	Upload Photo	Q26303512
Gravitts Farm House	II	Peens Lane			25 March 1987	TQ7758948789; 51°12′38″N 0°32′28″E		1344365	Upload Photo	Q26628094
Keeper's Cottage	II	Peens Lane			25 March 1987	TQ7713249416; 51°12′59″N 0°32′06″E		1060771	Upload Photo	Q26313937
Lime Tree Cottage	II	The Green			23 May 1967	TQ7683951285; 51°14′00″N 0°31′54″E		1344346	Upload Photo	Q26628078
Oak Cottage Oak Tree Cottage	II	The Green			25 March 1987	TQ7677951360; 51°14′03″N 0°31′51″E		1060766	Upload Photo	Q26313933
The Old Farmhouse	II	The Green			25 March 1987	TQ7676851329; 51°14′02″N 0°31′50″E		1068744	Upload Photo	Q26321438
The Old House	II	The Green			23 May 1967	TQ7677951380; 51°14′03″N 0°31′51″E		1356134	Upload Photo	Q26638829
65, the Quarries	II	65, The Quarries			25 March 1987	TQ7729551716; 51°14′13″N 0°32′18″E		1060734	Upload Photo	Q26313905
88, the Quarries	II	88, The Quarries			25 March 1987	TQ7739351664; 51°14′12″N 0°32′23″E		1060736	Upload Photo	Q26313907
Fir Tree Cottage	II	28, The Quarries			25 March 1987	TQ7710351674; 51°14′12″N 0°32′08″E		1344367	Upload Photo	Q26628096
Quarry House	II	49, The Quarries			23 May 1967	TQ7721951707; 51°14′13″N 0°32′14″E		1344366	Upload Photo	Q26628095
Stone House	II	68, The Quarries			7 August 1990	TQ7728651687; 51°14′13″N 0°32′18″E		1240388	Upload Photo	Q26533318
Stone Masons Workshop and Yard	II	The Quarries			7 August 1990	TQ7732251712; 51°14′13″N 0°32′19″E		1344390	Upload Photo	Q26628118
Tanyard	II	Wierton Hill			23 May 1967	TQ7799649534; 51°13′02″N 0°32′50″E		1060738	Upload Photo	Q26313909
Wierton Cottage	II	Wierton Hill			23 May 1967	TQ7806049741; 51°13′09″N 0°32′54″E		1049074	Upload Photo	Q26301130
Wierton Grange	II	Wierton Hill			25 March 1987	TQ7840450256; 51°13′25″N 0°33′13″E		1344368	Upload Photo	Q26628097
Garden Building to the North-west of Wierton Place	II	Wierton Road			10 January 2002	TQ7807549900; 51°13′14″N 0°32′55″E		1389638	Upload Photo	Q26669071
Greenhouses About 30 Metres North of Wierton Place and Attached Garden Wall	II	Wierton Road			25 March 1987	TQ7809249947; 51°13′15″N 0°32′56″E		1373870	Upload Photo	Q26654786
Wierton Place	II	Wierton Road			10 January 2002	TQ7812949890; 51°13′13″N 0°32′58″E		1389637	Upload Photo	Q26669070

== See also ==
- Grade I listed buildings in Kent
- Grade II* listed buildings in Kent

== Sources ==
- Newman, John (2012) [1969], Kent: West and the Weald, The Buildings of England, New Haven and London: Yale University Press, ISBN 978-0-300-18509-6
