= Clarinet Sonata (Howells) =

Composition by Herbert Howells

Herbert Howells's Clarinet Sonata for the clarinet in A in two movements was written in 1946. It was written for British clarinet player Frederick Thurston and was the composer's last major chamber work. (Note: In 1975, the composer began work on a Flute sonata that was unfinished at the time of his death.)

== History ==
The precise circumstances under which the sonata was composed are not known, but it is known that it is related to the rejection of the composer's 1942 oboe sonata by its intended dedicatee, Léon Goossens. Fabian Huss, writing on the relationship between the two compositions, speculates that the clarinet sonata grew out of the process of revising the oboe sonata. He noted that in 1947 Howells wrote in a review of Ralph Vaughan Williams Oboe Concerto that he considered the oboe best suited for short musical spans, much shorter than the ones he had included in the oboe sonata.

Both Huss and the anonymous writer of the liner notes to the Hyperion recording of the oboe sonata, point to similarities in the rhythmical procedures and musical structure between the two compositions to argue that the clarinet sonata represents the result of an attempt by the composer to simplify and clarify the structural concepts he had explored in the oboe sonata combined with a change of instrument to one he felt better suited to them.

Aileen Razey in their thesis comments that despite advocacy from Frederick Thurston, Boosey & Hawkes did not publish the sonata, in a transcription for the B♭ clarinet, until 1956.

== Structure ==
The two movements have the main tempo indications:

1. Con moto, dolce e con tenerezza
2. Allegro, ritmico, con brio

The music is typical of Howells's improvised sound world and is technically challenging, with sweeping arpeggiated figurations. The piece is also available transcribed for the B♭ clarinet from Boosey and Hawkes's music archive.
