= Ightham =

Village in Kent, England

Coordinates: 51.285°N 0.288°E

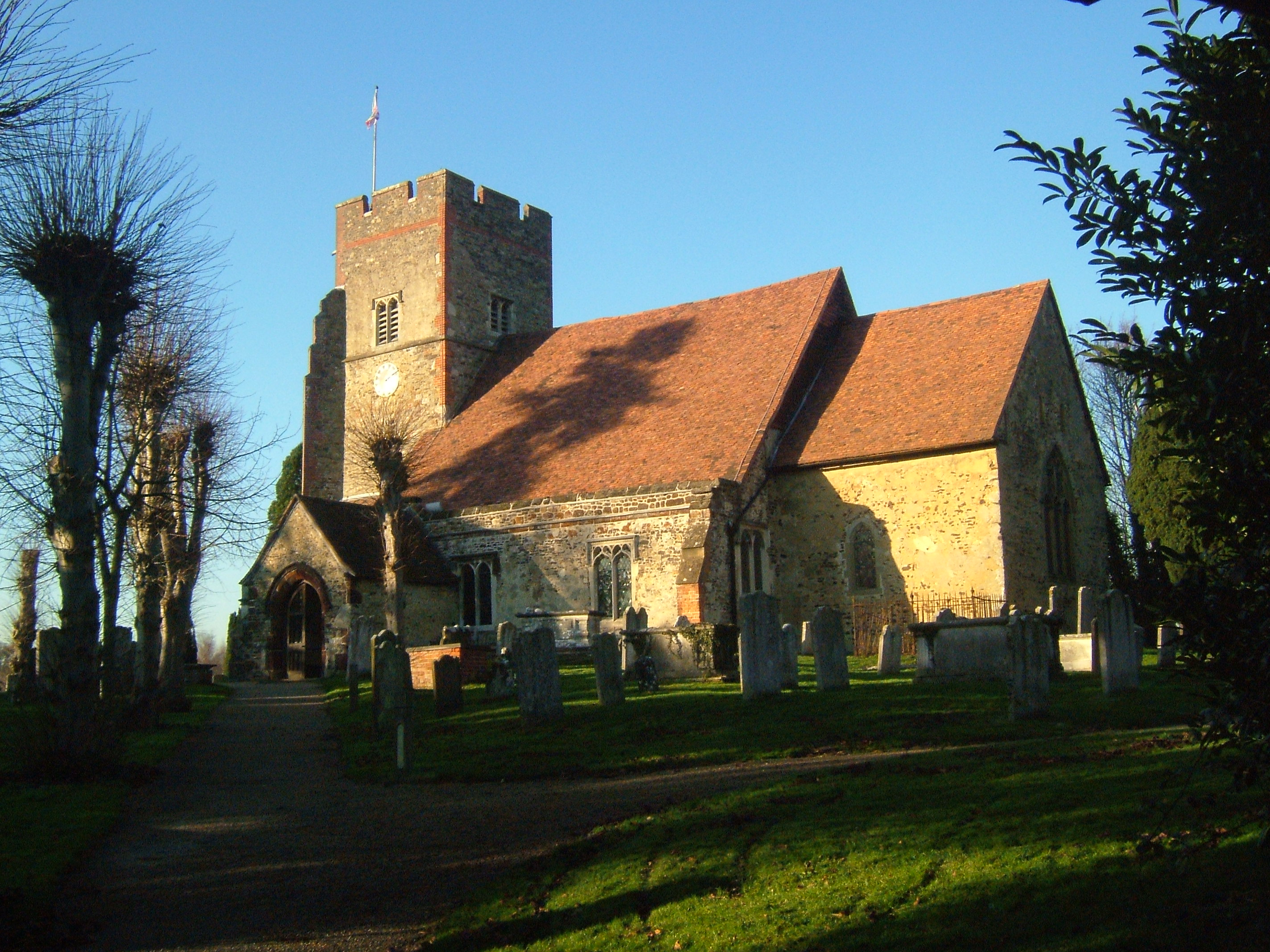

- Location within Kent
- Population: 2,084 (2011 Census)
- OS grid reference: TQ595565
- District: Tonbridge & Malling
- Shire county: Kent
- Region: South East
- Country: England
- Sovereign state: United Kingdom
- Post town: SEVENOAKS
- Postcode district: TN15
- Dialling code: 01732
- Police: Kent
- Fire: Kent
- Ambulance: South East Coast
- UK Parliament: Tonbridge

Ightham (/ˈaɪtəm/ EYE-təm) is a parish and village in Kent, England, located approximately four miles east of Sevenoaks and six miles north of Tonbridge. The parish includes the hamlet of Ivy Hatch.

Ightham is famous for the nearby medieval manor of Ightham Mote (National Trust), although the village itself is of greater antiquity.

== Place names ==
The name Ightham derived from the name of Ehta (a Jutish personal name) and ham ('homestead'). It is spelt 'Ehteham' in the Textus Roffensis. Many place names in the parish are of Anglo-Saxon or Jutish origin. Places were named as these settlers found them. Oldbury had clearly been fortified, so the Jutes called it Eald-byrig from the Anglo-Saxon eald (old) and byrig (fortified place).

== History ==
=== Stone Age ===
The presence of flint workshops at Oldbury Camp, excavated by Benjamin Harrison in 1905 and at Rose Wood on Ightham Common are evidence of the presence of humans in the Palaeolithic period. The earliest trackway crossing the parish runs mainly as a ridgeway on top of the North Downs from East Kent to Salisbury Plain.

=== Iron Age ===
The fort at Oldbury is assumed to have been built around 100 BC, possibly to protect against Belgic invaders. Oldbury was in the centre of a series of forts running 70 miles from Holmbury in Surrey to the west to Bigberry near Canterbury to the east. Oldbury is the largest of all at 123 acres. It held a position on a key communications route, and was useful to the romans.

=== Roman period ===
Benjamin Harrison of Ightham excavated the site of a tile works and possible Roman villa at Patchgrove Wood on the northwest edge of Oldbury Hill, close outside the parish.

=== Early Medieval period ===
In the 6th century, there was a settlement by the River Bourne.

=== Medieval period ===
It is not known how the boundaries of the parish were established. There is no hard evidence for the establishment of a Saxon church, and Ightham was not mentioned in the Domesday Book. The inclusion of the church in the Textus Roffensis in 1122 may reflect an older church as it may be a copy of an earlier Saxon list. The network of parishes has been relatively stable since Anglo-Saxon times. In North West Kent parishes are single townships and cover 1000–6000 acres. Originally Ightham had 2611 acres. Tithes were paid to a parish priest.

In 1315 Edward II granted a request for permission to hold an annual fair in the village.

Skynners was built by 1555 as Valentine Skynner was fined 10d for his house encroaching on the highway in that year. The right half became a blacksmiths and has a 19th-century gabled extension to the right and a wing to the rear. The left house became Daedalus Arms, an inn. George Wright was a builder and grocer during the 1871 census and his wife was a shopkeeper and innkeeper. Between the wars it was a garage and now the whole property is called Old Forge House.

=== War Years ===
During the First World War, 46 men of the parish fought and died. A war memorial was erected opposite the George and Dragon and unveiled on 5 December 1920 by Major General Sir William Furse. The Bishop of Rochester unveiled a tablet in their honour in February 1921 in St Peter's Church.

With Ightham close to West Malling and Biggin Hill airfields, local people would have had a good view of the Battle of Britain. For example, in September 1940, the Button factory on Church lane was evacuated due to dogfighting. During the Blitz in 1940–41, Ightham was directly under a route of German bombers on their way to attack London. Ightham was hit by 450 high-explosive bombs and 20 flying bombs or rockets. Oldbury Hatch was badly burnt by incendiary bombs and in September 1940 a bomb hit two houses in Jubilee Crescent and another in Copt Hall. During the war a bomb also fell on a house in Chapel Row.

In September 1940, pilot Noel Stansfeld's Hawker Hurricane crashed at Ightham Place after combat with German Messerschmitt Bf 109s over Edenbridge. In the same confrontation, FO Malcolm Ravenhill was shot down, and he died after his Hurricane crashed on Church Road.

Although bombs were dropped in the village, the school continued its usual pattern, some of the children were evacuated to the West Country in 1941 but they soon returned. June 1944 attacks by V-1 flying bombs prompted the evacuation of Ightham children, as well as London evacuees in Ightham and a number of mothers, to Devon and to Chard in Somerset.

== Other ==
Ightham was famous for growing Kentish cob nuts. These seem to have been cultivated first by James Usherwood, who lived at Cob Tree Cottage. There was a public house nearby called the Cob Tree Inn, which has now reverted to a private house, and the local school has a cobnut as its logo. There are still a number of cob trees in and around the village, but the work of pruning them and picking the nuts is labour-intensive, and the industry has fallen into decline.

Ightham also has its own football team, Ightham FC. Home games are played at the recreation ground adjoining the A25. It also has a Scout group 1st Ightam scouts

== Historically significant buildings ==
=== Main Manor Houses ===
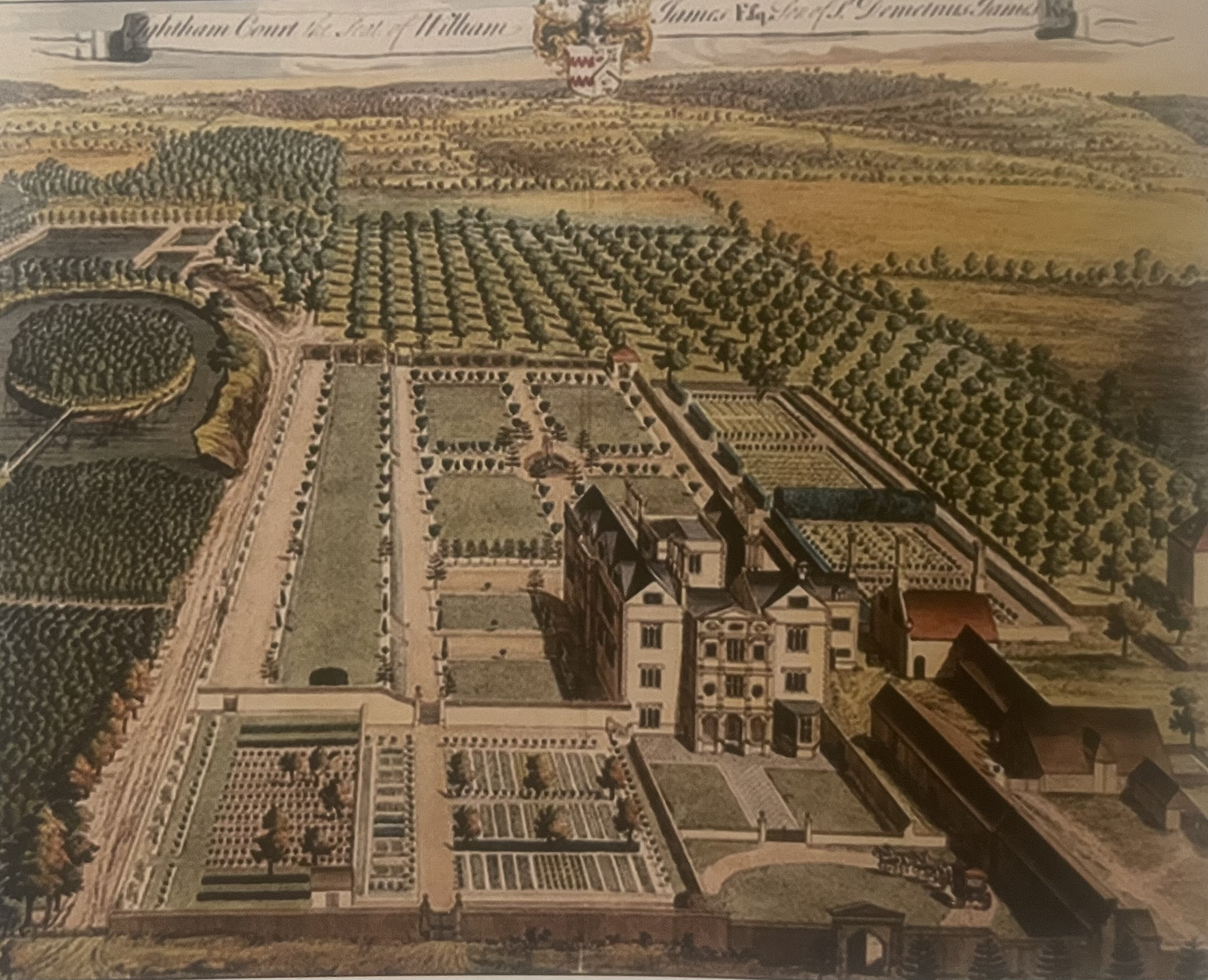
Ightham Court 1719, engraving by Johannes Kip. It was built for Thomas Willoughby in the 1570s.

There were three Manor Houses in the original parish – the St Clere estate, Ightham Court (Ightham Lodge) and Ightham Mote in the far south of the parish, at the northernmost Kent Weald. All three have origins stretching back to at least the late 12th Century. At the end of the 1400s the parish consisted of the village centre, several hamlets and a large number of dispersed farms.

=== St Peter’s Church ===
The earliest record of a church in Ightham is in the Textus Roffensis, which lists the churches paying for blessed chrism oil on Thursday of Holy Week. Ightham was charged nine pence.

The position of St Peter's Church on a knoll overlooking the village and with views over the parish is typically Saxon; however there is no trace of the earliest, perhaps wooden church. The fabric of the church is early Norman onwards. There are several fine monuments, and a collection of 20 hatchments.

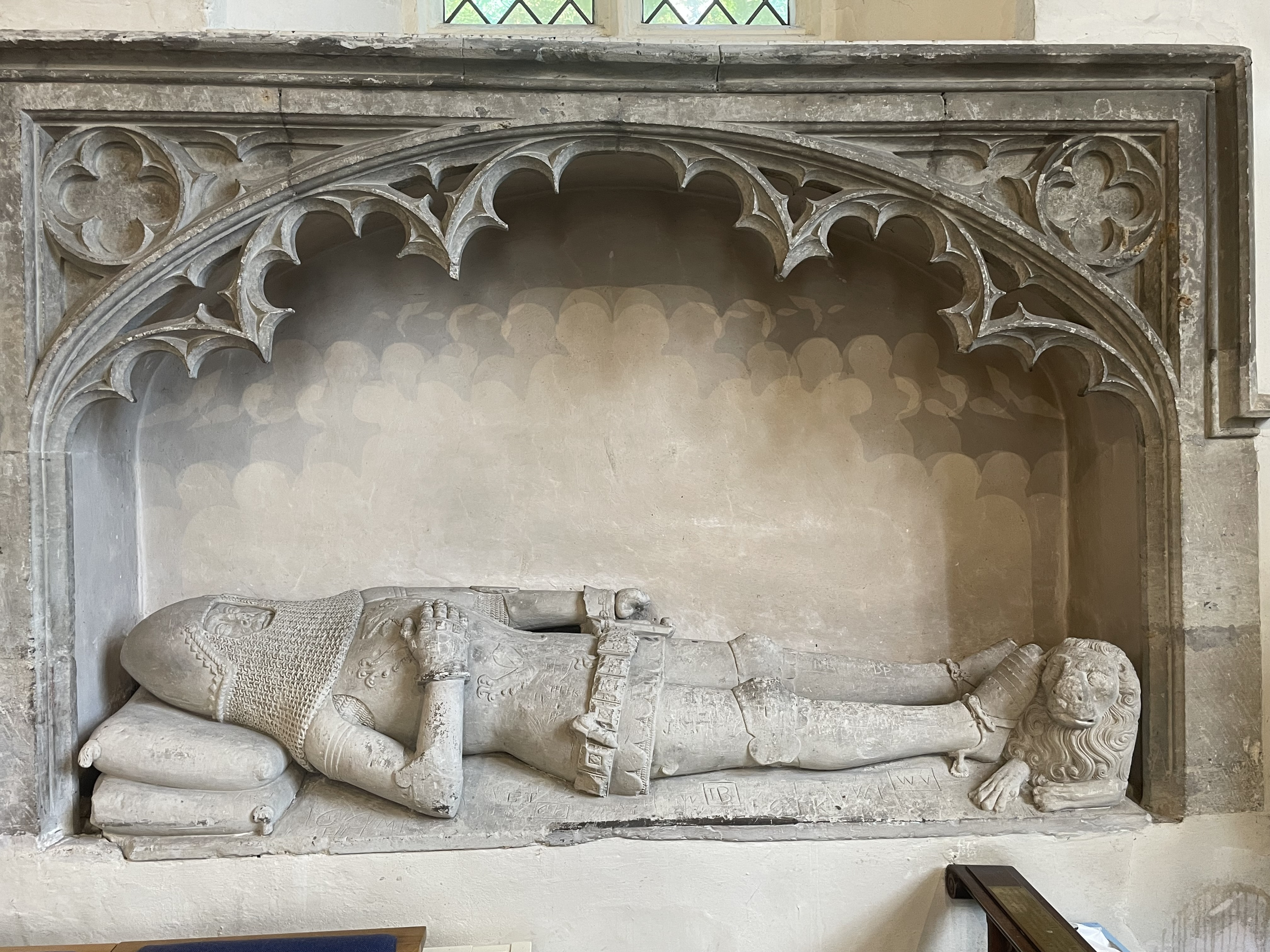
This life-size memorial of Sir Thomas Cawne of Ightham Mote dates to about 1374 and is the oldest of the three main memorials in the church.

== Geography ==
The chalk North Downs have a layer of clay-with-flints in many places, including the finger of Ightham parish which reaches the crest of the Downs near Drane Farm. The highest point of the ancient parish in the north was near Drane Farm at over 700 feet above sea level. The Vale of Holmesdale runs through the parish south of the Downs. There is a steep drop to about 320 feet in the Vale of Holmesdale south of St Clere. Along the length of the Vale runs a band of Gault, blue-grey clay, a mile wide with some alluvial deposits. This was cultivated by the early settlers. To the south the land climbs gradually towards the northern part of Oldbury Hill. This hill covers 123 acres and climbs from 400 to over 600 feet then drops and climbs to nearly 650n feet at the edge of the Chart at Beacon or Raspit Hill.In the southern part of the parish are the Chart Hills or Greensand Ridge.Ightham common is at the western end of the eastern end of the eastern part of the hills and was covered with woodland and ferns, often boggy, limiting agricultural use. To the South of the Chart Hills the parish edges into the Wealden forest. The land was more suitable for agriculture than on the chart Hills. The inhabitants of Ightham would have used the forest to fatten their pigs in autumn on acorns.

== Demographics ==
Ightham compared
2001 UK Census	Ightham ward	Tonbridge and Malling borough	England
Population	1,942	107,561	49,138,831
Foreign born	8.1%	4.6%	9.2%
White	99.1%	98.3%	90.9%
Asian	0.6%	0.7%	4.6%
Black	0.3%	0.1%	2.3%
Christian	82.4%	76.1%	71.7%
Muslim	0.2%	0.3%	3.1%
Hindu	0%	0.2%	1.1%
No religion	11.6%	15%	14.6%
Unemployed	1.9%	1.9%	3.3%
Retired	13.9%	14.2%	13.5%

The estimated population of the parish of Ightham in 1660 was 325 and this approximately doubled to 709 by the first national census in 1801.

At the 2001 UK census, the Ightham electoral ward had a population of 1,940. The ethnicity was 99.1% White, 0% Mixed Race, 0.6% Asian, 0.3% Black and 0% Other. The place of birth of residents was 91.9% United Kingdom, 0.5% Republic of Ireland, 2% other Western European countries, and 5.6% elsewhere. Religion was recorded as 82.4% Christian, 0.2% Buddhist, 0% Hindu, 0% Sikh, 0.5% Jewish, and 0.2% Muslim. 11.6% were recorded as having no religion, 0.4% had an alternative religion and 4.7% did not state their religion.

The economic activity of residents aged 16–74 was 38.2% in full-time employment, 11.6% in part-time employment, 14.7% self-employed, 1.9% unemployed, 1.9% students with jobs, 3.5% students without jobs, 13.9% retired, 11.2% looking after home or family, 1.1% permanently sick or disabled and 1.9% economically inactive for other reasons. The industry of employment of residents was 12.3% retail, 9.4% manufacturing, 7.2% construction, 18.3% real estate, 8.2% health and social work, 8.3% education, 4.3% transport and communications, 3.2% public administration, 4.3% hotels and restaurants, 17.9% finance, 1.3% agriculture and 5.3% other. Compared with national figures, the ward had a relatively high proportion of workers in finance and real estate. There were a relatively low proportion in manufacturing, public administration, transport and communications. Of the ward's residents aged 16–74, 35.7% had a higher education qualification or the equivalent, compared with 19.9% nationwide.

== Notable people ==
- Cheryl Baker, singer with The Fizz and TV presenter lives in the village.
- Martina Cole (born 30 March 1959), novelist. Has lived in the village since 2005.
- Thomas Riversdale Colyer-Fergusson VC (18 February 1896 – 31 July 1917), recipient of the Victoria Cross, which is displayed in the chapel at Ightham Mote.
- Lord Eversley (when Mr. George John Shaw-Lefevre), and his wife, Constance, lived at Oldbury Place in Ightham during the time he was Postmaster General.
- Roger K. Furse - (1903–1972), costume designer
- Len Goodman - (1944–2023), TV presenter
- Benjamin Harrison (1837–1921), a grocer who won international recognition as a pioneer in the realm of archaeology. He contended that flints he found in the pre-glacial drift on the North Downs near Ash were artefacts, thus vastly antedating the antiquity of man.
- William Lambarde, author of the first English county history, A Perambulation of Kent, married his first wife, Jane, in 1570 at Ightham Church on her 17th birthday. They then lived at the family home of the Manor of St Clere. Jane died on 21 September 1573, but William continued to live at the house for another 10 years.
- Anna Lee (1913–2004), British actress.
- Caroline Mary Luard – British murder victim
- William Sutton (1830–1888), recipient of the Victoria Cross
- William Tomkin (1860–1940), British watercolour artist, draughtsman and Assistant to General Augustus Pitt Rivers. Along with other family members he is buried in the village churchyard.
