= Six Metamorphoses after Ovid =

Piece for oboe by Benjamin Britten

- by Benjamin Britten
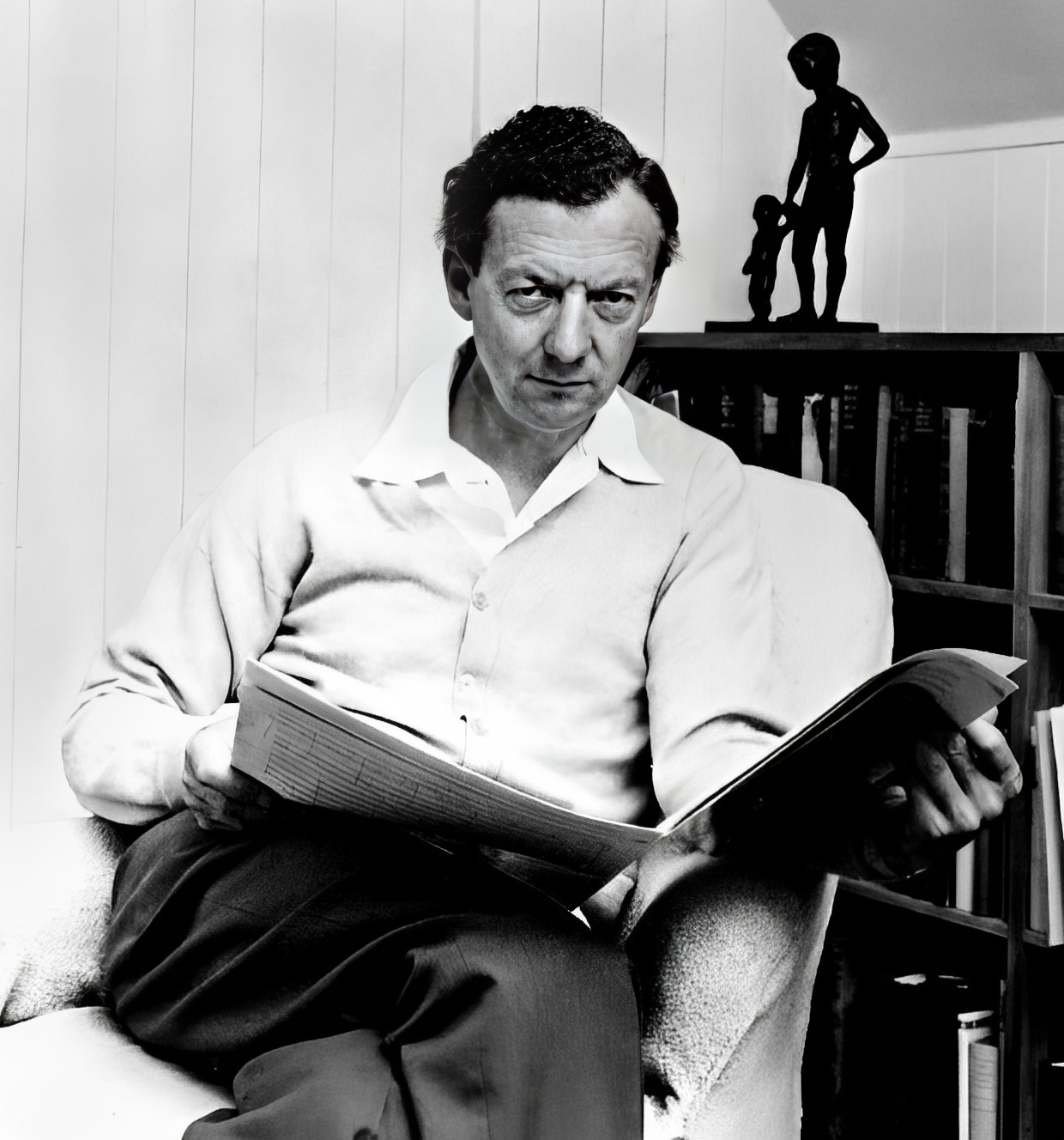
- Britten in 1968
- Opus: 49
- Year: 1951
- Occasion: 1951 Aldeburgh Festival
- Based on: Ovid's Metamorphoses
- Movements: Six

Premiere
- Date: 14 June 1951
- Location: Meare at Thorpeness
- Performers: Joy Boughton

Six Metamorphoses after Ovid, Op. 49, is an unaccompanied piece for solo oboe written by English composer Benjamin Britten. The work was composed in 1951 as a means of relaxation while Britten was working on his opera Billy Budd. It was written for oboist Joy Boughton, a member of the orchestra for the English Opera Group whom Britten admired; Boughton premiered the work at the 1951 Aldeburgh Festival on 14 June 1951 in an outdoor concert at the Thorpeness Meare. Since its premiere, Six Metamorphoses has come to be regarded as a staple of oboe literature and one of the most significant works for solo woodwind.

Six Metamorphoses is based on the epic poem Metamorphoses by the Roman poet Publius Ovidius Naso. The piece is composed of six movements, each drawing from a single narrative of Ovid's poem. The first movement, "Pan", follows the tale of the namesake satyr's attempted rape of the nymph Syrinx. The second movement, "Phaeton", concerns the catastrophic attempt of Helios's son to drive the chariot of the sun. The third movement, "Niobe", concerns a Phrygian queen whose fourteen children are vengefully killed by Apollo and Diana. The fourth movement, "Bacchus", depicts a conventional Bacchic feast. The fifth movement, "Narcissus", depicts how the title character fell in love with his own reflection. The final movement, "Arethusa", tells of the title nymph's flight from an attempted rape by the river-god Alpheus. Britten's score provides a brief epigraph for each movement, in addition to the titles.

The piece is published by Boosey and Hawkes. Its combined six movements last approximately 13 minutes.

== History ==
=== Composition ===
Britten wrote Six Metamorphoses in the summer of 1951 as a means of relaxation during the composition of his opera, Billy Budd. 1951 was a productive year for the composer, and the opera took up most of his time. Most likely, Britten began composition after the 1 May premiere of an edition of Henry Purcell's opera Dido and Aeneas, which the composer had prepared in collaboration with Imogen Holst. Nevertheless, Britten's musical diary entry from 28–29 March contains sketches of what would eventually be the opening of the "Niobe" movement, suggesting that Britten had been thinking about the composition for a while before its premiere.

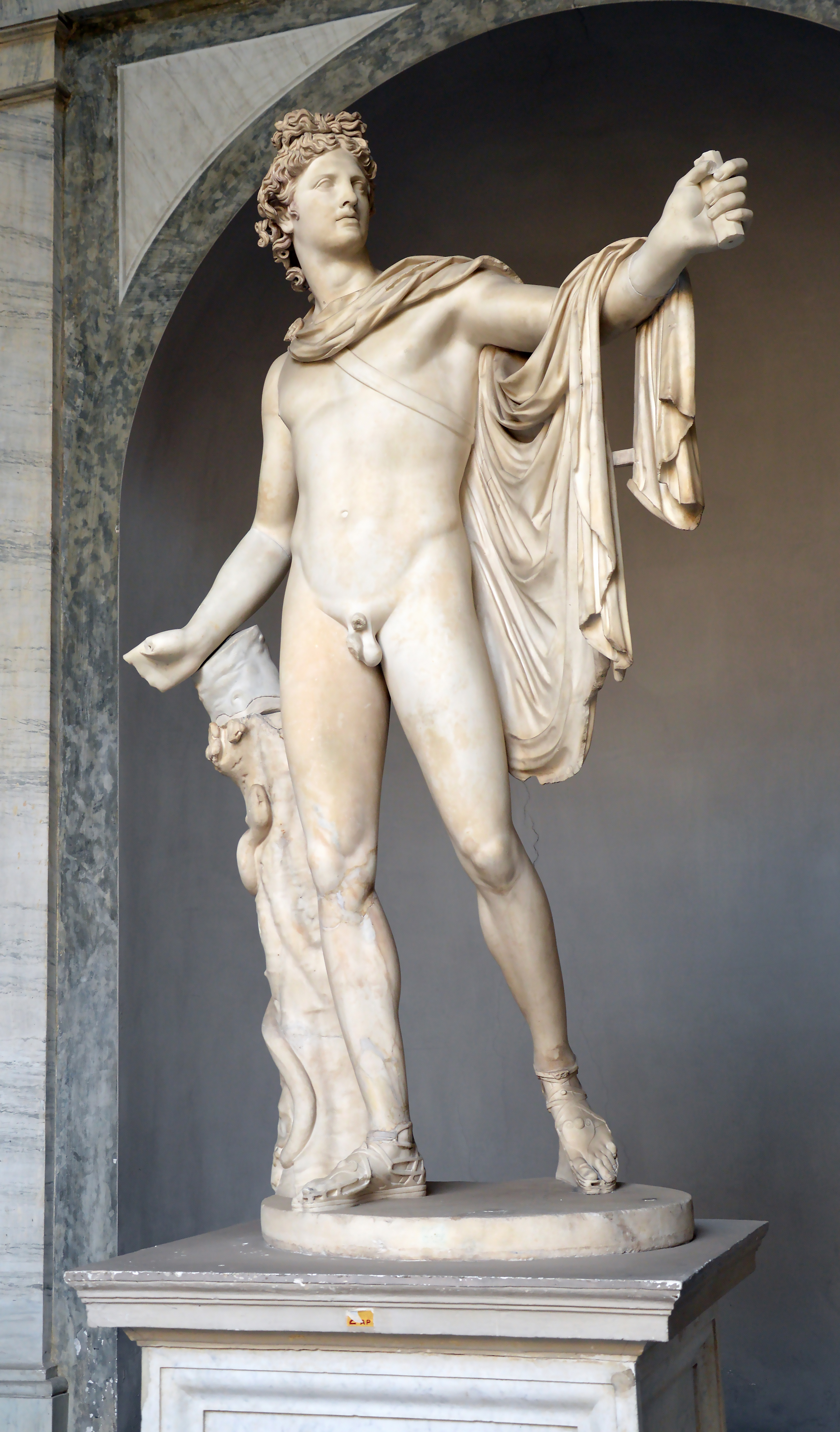
Statue of Apollo of the Belvedere

George Caird argues that the classical influences that inspired Six Metamorphoses were a broad influence on the composer, whose importance was comparable to that of Christian religion. Britten visited similar subject matter throughout his career, including Young Apollo (1939), The Rape of Lucretia (1946), and Phaedra (1975). Caird partially attributes the composer's interest in classical mythology to his lifelong companion, Peter Pears, in addition to literary figures such as W. H. Auden, E. M. Forster, and Hermann Melville, the latter having written the namesake novella that Britten adapted in Billy Budd. Caird specifically observes a fascination with the Apollo, who is referenced in Billy Budd and appears in both the "Phaeton" and "Niobe" myths of Six Metamorphoses. Sotos Djiovanis posits a broader thematic connection between the protagonist of Billy Budd and the characters of Six Metamorphoses, both of whom are subjected to the violence and influence of more powerful beings.

Six Metamorphoses is the last of four pieces featuring solo oboe that Britten wrote throughout his career. His previous entries in the genre include Phantasy Quartet, Op. 2 (1932), Two Insect Pieces (1935), and Temporal Variations (1936). Of these, Six Metamorphoses is the only piece written for unaccompanied oboe, and at the time it was his only work written for a solo instrument other than piano. According to Sheri Lee Mattson, the piece likely influenced Britten's later compositions for solo cello.

=== Performance ===
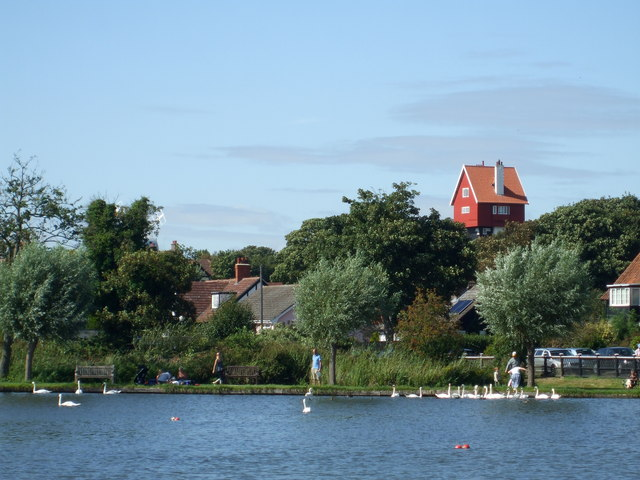
The Meare at Thorpeness, 2009

The premiere of the piece took place on 14 June 1951 at 4:30 p.m. on the Meare. The concert was directed by Boris Ord and performed by the Cambridge University Madrigal Society, with Britten's piece accompanying other contemporary compositions as well as Jacobean part songs and English madrigals. Britten specifically composed Six Metamorphoses to be performed by the oboist Joy Boughton, whose playing Britten greatly admired. At the time, Boughton was a member of the orchestra for the English Opera group, which Britten had earlier helped found. The work was originally envisioned as an occasion piece to be performed outside at the Meare at Thorpeness during the Aldeburgh Festival; the outdoor setting was to contribute to the pastoral nature of the music, in which atmospheric sounds from the water, wind, and birds could become part of the music, especially during its frequent pauses. Britten intended for the audience and performers to sit on moving punts. However, Boughton refused out of fear for her personal safety, and performed the piece on the opposite shore from the audience. It may be noted that Boughton performed the piece on a barge two years later; it may also be noted that one of the boats floated away during the concert, carrying the madrigal singers with it, thereby justifying Boughton's fears. The premiere of Britten's piece itself was not without incident either, as the score had to be saved and dried after a gust of wind blew its pages into the water.

Nowhere in the score is it required for Six Metamorphoses to be performed outside. Rather, the piece has usually been performed in indoor concert halls. On one particularly notable occasion, Britten was treated during a trip to the Soviet Union in 1966 to a private ballet performance choreographed to Six Metamorphoses featuring a group of dancers from the Kirov Ballet.

=== Reception ===
Since its premiere, Six Metamorphoses has received the approval of critics, although some viewed the piece as a curiosity for oboists less important than Britten's major works. Nevertheless, even these critics approved of Britten's ability to showcase the instrument's expressive and technical versatility. Wendel Margrave wrote that Britten's piece was written "skillfully and lovingly" but that the movements comprised "pieces for oboists who are also Britten enthusiasts." Another critic, praising the pieces as "extraordinarily vivid and beautiful musical pictures," wrote that "Britten can do more with one short phrase than most modern composers with a symphony, an in his hands the single instrument hits off each character with perfect musical imagery and understanding."

Nevertheless, Six Metamorphoses has come to be regarded both as one of the most relevant pieces in the oboe repertoire and also as one of the most prominent pieces written for any solo instrument.>

== Synopsis ==
Britten's piece draws its program from six mythological episodes told in Ovid's Metamorphoses. Most of the stories that Britten chose involve the physical transformation of one of the characters. As an indication of the programmatic element of the music, Britten includes the following titles and brief descriptions of the movements:

1. Pan, "who played upon the reed pipe which was Syrinx, his beloved."
2. Phaeton, "who rode upon the chariot of the sun for one day and was hurled into the river Padus by a thunderbolt."
3. Niobe, "who, lamenting the death of her fourteen children, was turned into a mountain."
4. Bacchus, "at whose feasts is heard the noise of gaggling women's tattling tongues and shouting out of boys."
5. Narcissus, "who fell in love with his own image and became a flower."
6. Arethusa, "who, flying from the love of Alpheus the river god, was turned into a fountain."

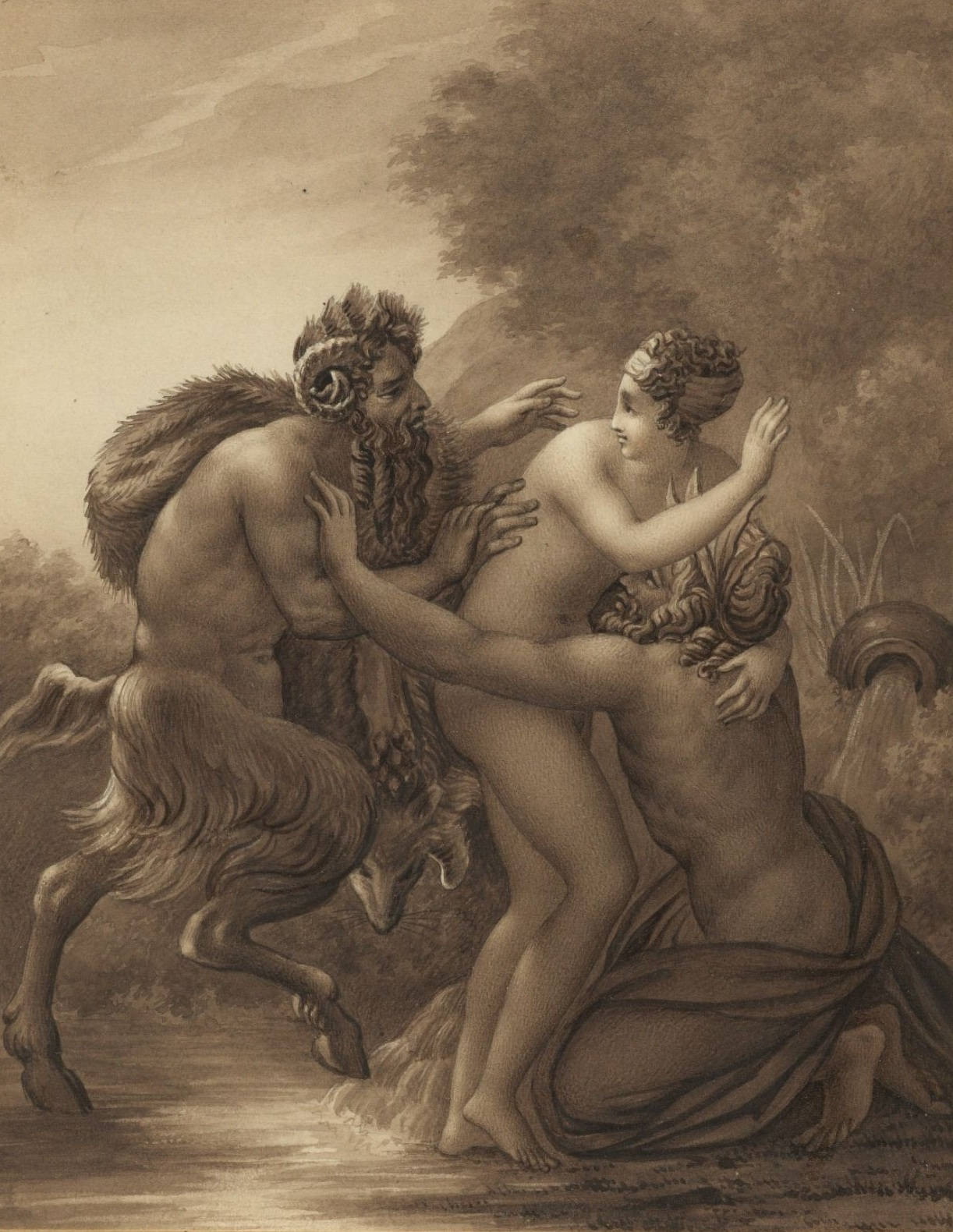
Pan poursuivant Syrinx drawing by Girodet, 1826

The "Syrinx" narrative appears as a story told by Mercury to Argus within the larger "Io" narrative in Metamorphoses. The story is framed as an aetiological narrative concerning the origin of reed pipes. The nymph Syrinx is a follower of the virgin hunter-goddess Diana and is said to have been successful warding off many suitors and attempts to do the same with Pan. When the latter chases her, Syrinx's sisters save her by turning her into marshy reeds at the banks of the Ladon. Pan finds that his sigh happens to create a sound through the reeds and binds uneven pipes together with wax into an instrument, naming it after Syrinx.

Phaeton's story begins when he seeks out his Apollo in order to prove his mother's claim that the god is his father. Apollo confirms his paternity and, as a gesture of love, swears by the Styx to fulfill any wish Phaeton may desire. When Phaeton wishes to drive his father's sun chariot for a day, Apollo is unable to convince him to retract the wish and cannot take back his promise. Phaeton begins to drive the chariot, but the horses immediately resist his control and rampage about the skies. The constellations are placed out of order and fire is set to all the world, boiling its rivers and creating deserts. The Earth begs Jupiter to take action, and the latter ends the chaos by striking the chariot with lightning. Phaeton falls to the earth as a shooting star, and his burning body is buried by his sister nymphs.

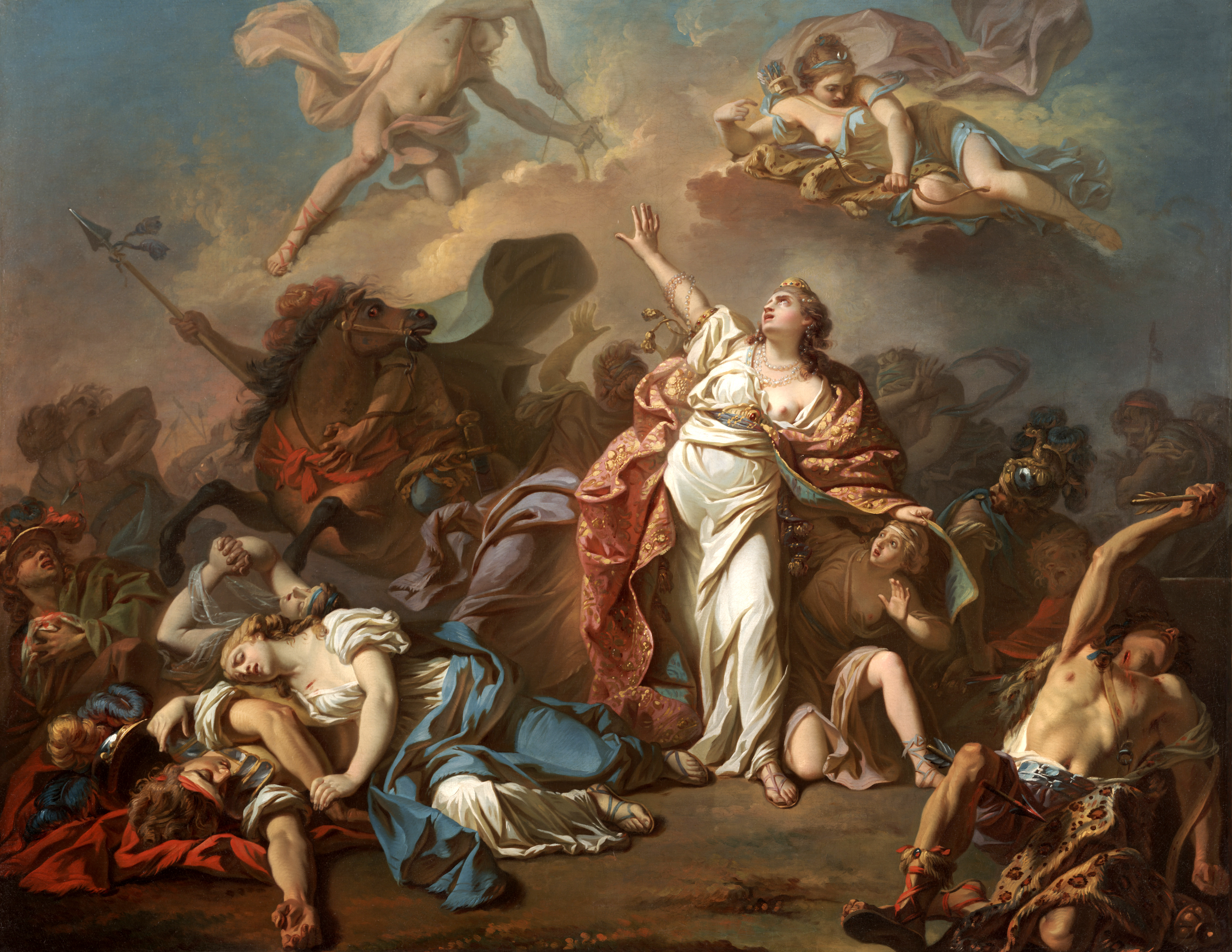
A 1772 painting by Jacques-Louis David depicting Niobe attempting to shield her children from Artemis and Apollo

Niobe is the Phrygian queen of Thebes. When the prophetess Manto calls for all the women of Thebes to worship the goddess Latona, Niobe refuses to let them obey. She claims herself to be Latona's superior since she has seven daughters and seven sons, while the goddess has two children. Latona, angry, orders her children Apollo and Diana to make Niobe childless. They obey and kill all Niobe's sons, though the last son begs for his life; after this, Niobe's husband commits suicide. Nevertheless, Niobe gloats that she still has more children than Latona, so Apollo and Diana kill her remaining daughters. Paralyzed by grief, Niobe turns into a statue and is set on a mountaintop by a gust of wind, though the stone continues to weep tears.

There is no particular story in Metamorphoses concerning a traditional Bacchic festival, although the festivals take place in the backdrop of the narrative of Procne and Philomela, and Maenads appear to rend the body of Orpheus after he rejects their advances. Most prominently, Bacchus appears in the story of Pentheus, the young king of Thebes. Attempting to stop the Bacchic festivals, Pentheus eavesdrops on the unknown rites until he is spotted by his mother, Agave, herself a Maenad; in her drunken frenzy, Agave mistakes Pentheus for a boar and tears him to pieces with her sisters.

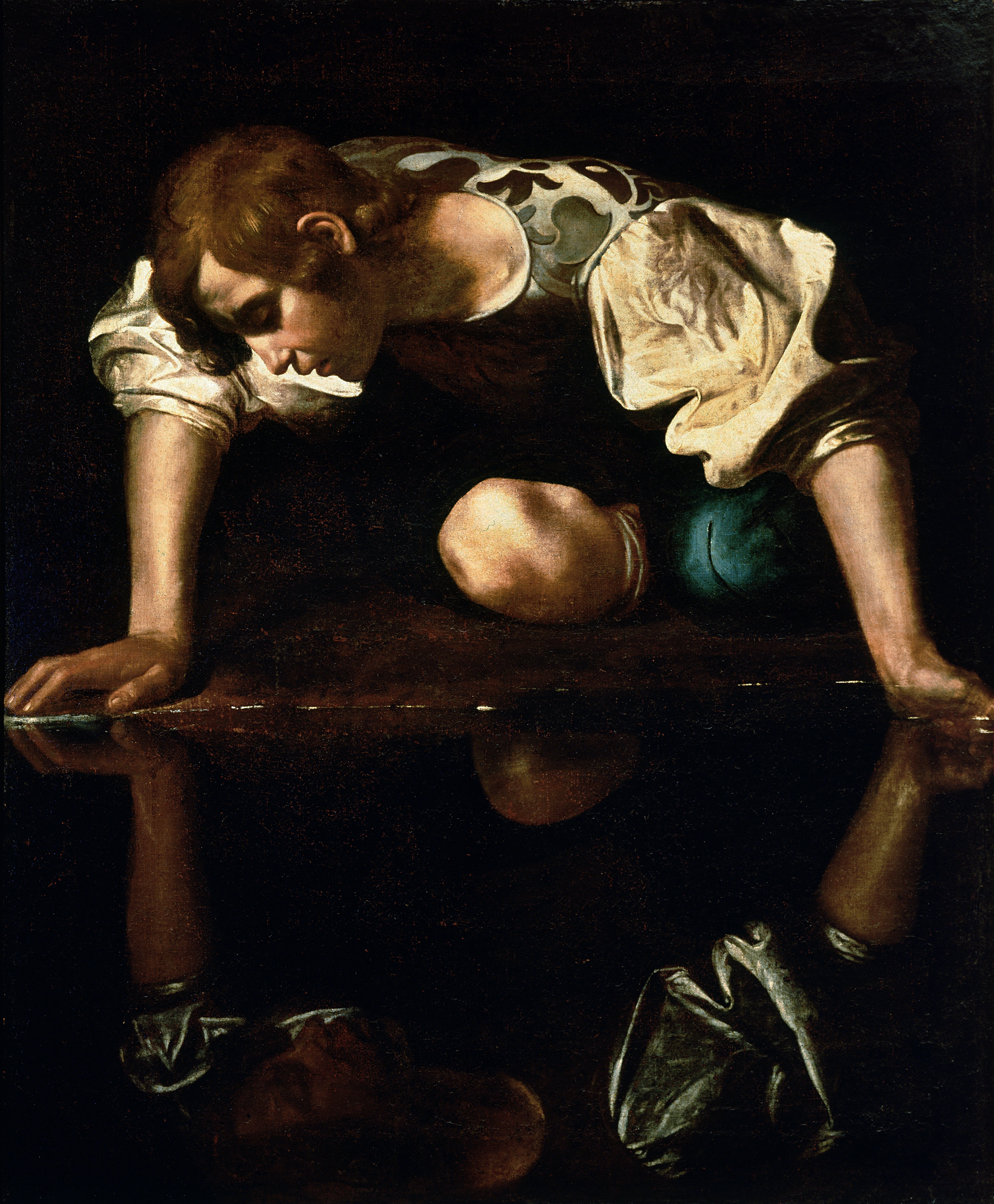
Narcissus, painting by Caravaggio

Narcissus is born the son of the nymph Liriope, who takes the boy to the prophet Tiresias and asks if he will live a long life; to this, Tiresias answers, "If he never knows himself." Years later, Narcissus, now an unusually attractive adolescent, spurns many male and female lovers and admirers, including the nymph Echo. Cursed by the Furies, Narcissus finds an untouched pool of water and falls in love with his own reflection. After attempting to touch and kiss and hear the words of the reflection, he recognizes the image as himself. Maddened, he disrupts the water of the pool until his reflection is no longer visible and melts away until only a flower is left in his place.

The story of Arethusa is embedded within the larger narrative of Pluto's rape of Proserpina, in which Arethusa helps Ceres find her daughter. At the start of the narrative, Arethusa is a nymph of Achaea, where she enjoys hunting. There, she enters the river Alpheus to bathe naked but flees when the god of the river attempts to seduce her. Chased by Alpheus and about to be caught, Arethusa calls to Diana for help; the goddess hides her in a cloud, where she begins to transform into a fountain. When he recognizes the fountain, Alpheus mixes the waters of his stream with Arethusa's waters; after this, Diana carries Arethusa away to the island of Ortygia, where she remains.

All of the episodes are drawn from the first few of the fifteen books of Metamorphoses: Pan and Syrinx appear in book I, Phaeton appears in books I–II, Narcissus and Pentheus appear in book III, Arethusa appears in book V, and Niobe appears in Book VI. Vincent Mark Biggam notes a chiastic structure in the choice of myths: the outer movements concern nymphs who flee love and are assisted by other gods, the inner three movements (Phaeton, Niobe, and Bacchus) concern the folly of egotism, and the central "Bacchus" episode depicts an entire scene rather than a single story or metamorphosis. George Caird similarly finds "Bacchus" to be unique among Britten's movements. He claims that the other movements all depict specific relationships between individuals—man and woman in "Pan" and "Arethusa", father and son in "Phaeton", mother and child in "Niobe", and the relationship between Narcissus and himself—while "Bacchus" is a more complex tapestry of many characters and individual metamorphoses, all encapsulated within a narrative of the metamorphic effect of alcohol.

== Music ==
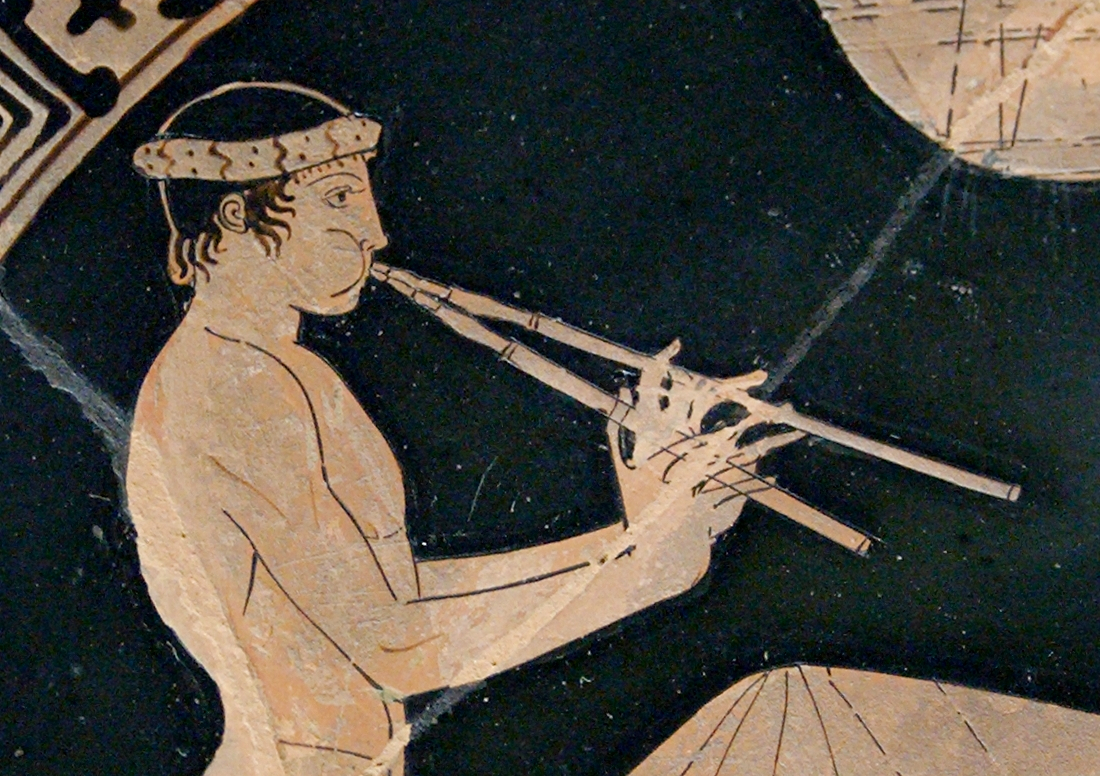
Man playing aulos, Attic red-figure cup painted by the Euaion Painter, 460–450 BC

Six Metamorphoses is written for solo oboe. George Caird attributes two significant effects to this choice. Firstly, the oboe is comparable with its ancient analog, the aulos, which was often associated with Dionysian rites and darker characteristics of ecstasy and impulsiveness, in addition to a connotation of grief from its use in Greek tragedy; such ancient context establishes a dichotomy between the oboe and string instruments such as Apollo's lyre, which is associated with healing and therapeutic power. Secondly, the use of a solo instrument emphasizes the importance of relationships between individual characters in Ovid's narratives. Britten is able to outline chords within a single oboe line, giving the effect of having many voices present in the piece while maintaining the instrument's individuality. Vincent Mark Biggam observes two specific techniques by which Britten is able to imply harmony within a solo line: arpeggiation and use of diatonic scales. He notes that most of the movements primarily utilize one of these two techniques: "Phaeton", "Niobe", and "Arethusa" use arpeggiation, while "Pan" and "Narcissus" use scales. Bacchus, which is twice as long as the other movements, is unique in incorporating both.

Britten makes the most of the instrument's expressive and technical capabilities. The piece utilizes the oboe's entire range, stretching from its use of the bottom B♭ to represent Phaethon's descent to Earth and a high F at the end of "Bacchus". An account by Sarah Francis details that Britten asked Boughton for a list of the most difficult techniques and maneuvers for the oboe and specifically made sure to include all of these in his piece. Sheri Lee Mattson notes that Britten makes the most of the oboe's relatively small tessitura through the use of sonic and timbral effects specific to the instrument. These include sharp articulations, changes in timbre dependent on volume and range, vibrato, and loud low notes. In addition to sonic effects specific to the oboe, Britten makes use of a rich variety of musical imagery through various motifs. This includes depictions of hiccups in "Bacchus", cascading fountains of notes in "Arethusa", and, notably, use of musical inversion to portray the reflected image of Narcissus.

In each movement, Britten utilizes conventional musical forms, such as ternary form, rondo form, and theme and variations. Of particular relevance is ternary form, which Sotos Djiovanis, elaborating upon Stephen Hiramoto's earlier analysis, argues provides a basic schema for Britten's portrayal of metamorphosis. According to this outline, the A section represents the figure or story before metamorphosis, and the B section represents the physical transformation. The second A section, which always incorporates musical characteristics of the B section, represents a new version of the self having been changed through metamorphosis. Felipe Mora Garzón, on the other hand, views the movements in question as having ABC form rather than ternary, in which the respective sections can be aligned with a Hegelian thesis, antithesis, and synthesis.

Much of the music of Six Metamorphoses is written without a definitive time signature. Nonetheless, according to Evelyn Rothwell, an oboist and friend of Britten's, the composer was extremely meticulous about the length of his note values, and the performer is expected to portray the music carefully, exactly as written. Initially, Britten did not publish his score with any tempo markings, but he added them in retroactively after he listened to a performance of the piece by Heinz Holliger and was horrified by the liberties taken.

=== I. Pan ===
"Pan" features the tempo marking senza misura and is the only movement with no time signature, emphasizing the movement's free-flowing nature. However, this supposed "free" feeling is created by the oboist's precise adherence to Britten's specific rhythmic choices rather than any rubato or ad lib. Bar placements are dictated by the lengths of phrases, and each phrase features different note and rest durations, lending the feeling that each measure is written with a different tempo. There is disagreement over the structure of the Pan movement. Djiovanis, following Hiramoto, recognizes the prototypical ternary structure, with a free-flowing A section, a B section with rising tension, and a modified A section with an attached coda; he attributes the music to Pan's perspective of Syrinx's metamorphosis. Octavian Velescu notes that since the coda resembles the B section, it is ambiguous whether "Pan" is written in ternary or ABAB form. Velescu associates this ambiguity with a nuanced interpretation of "Pan" in which both characters' perspectives are simultaneously represented: Ternary form represents the course of Syrinx's metamorphosis, with the A section depicting her free spirit, the rigid B section depicting the stasis of the reeds she transforms into, and the modified A section portraying her enduring spirit within those reeds; ABAB form represents an alternation between Pan's human and animalistic nature, respectively. Meanwhile, Mattson interprets the A and B sections as opposing each other in tonality and articulation, with the A section representing a desirous Pan and the B section representing the fleeing Syrinx.

The first phrase of the A section outlines a portion of a descending scale, in legato. The downward contour of the phrase repeats throughout the A section, and the short–short–long rhythmic pattern features throughout the movement. Caird notes a similarity between this opening and Debussy's Syrinx for solo flute, suggesting an intertextual motivation for Britten's choice to begin his piece with "Pan". The first two phrases together form the notes of a descending A major scale, but Biggam argues that these notes adhere to a pandiatonic use of the greater perfect system from Ancient Greece rather than firmly establishing a key of A major, further contributing to the movement's free-spirited character. Mattson, meanwhile, broadly locates the A section within the E mixolydian scale. From here, the A section continues to build up, with suspenseful pauses between phrases from fermatas and breath marks; eventually the section culminates with an F♯ rather than resolving to A major, foreshadowing the tension of the B section.

The dominant recurring motif of the B section features repeated staccato A♯ eighth notes, which jump up a few scale degrees and resolve back down to an A. At the end of the section, in measure 10, such a resolution is subverted by an outlined whole tone scale. Each time the A♯ motif returns, the number of eighth notes per measure increases, starting with 8 and ending with 23. Mattson locates the B section within the D Lydian scale, heavily opposed to the earlier E mixolydian due to the conflict between the notes A and A♯; she argues that the struggle between Pan and Syrinx is represented on a musical level through the struggle for dominance between the A and A♯. The music becomes more frantic, Mattson envisions, as Syrinx finds it increasingly difficult to evade Pan.

The reprised A section is similar to the opening of the piece but now integrates the A♯ note from the B section into its melody, even going so far as to end in a Lydian D scale. Djiovanis attaches special significance to Britten's choice to end on a D rather than the tonic A, as this note is the fundamental pitch of the oboe. Mattson argues that the presence of the A♯ indicates that the tension between Pan and Syrinx is not yet over, even as the former seems to achieve musical dominance. Alternatively, Mattson argues, the integration of Syrinx's A♯ into Pan's scale could correspond to a line in Ovid's text stating that the nymph's voice can no longer be distinguished from the god's as he plays her namesake reeds.

=== II. Phaeton ===
"Phaeton" is written with tempo marking vivaco ritmico and has time signature 12/8. However, the time signature is indicated in parentheses, indicating that the piece does not strictly adhere to it. Measure placements are determined by lengths of phrases, which can vary in numbers of beats; 6/8 and 15/8 measures are quite common. Djiovanis envisions "Phaeton" in ternary form, though B is a variation on A, and the reprise of A does not bear the influence of B; the latter he attributes to the lack of a physical metamorphosis in the mythological narrative. Biggam dissents, observing that the note F♯, prominent in the C Lydian B section, is integrated into the A section. Meanwhile, Mattson perceives "Phaeton" in ABC form (with an additional coda) and interprets it as depicting an "emotional metamorphosis", in which the music becomes less diatonic as the title character loses control.

The A section, which encompasses measures 1–18, is based on an octatonic scale centered at G. Harmony is suggested through the use of arpeggios, and the first few measures consist of various ascending dominant seventh arpeggios, starting with a first inversion C. Following Peter Evans' treatment, Biggam treats the C^{7} chord as a tonic in its own right, rather than a dominant, and he suggests a key of C mixolydian. The music of this section is broadly forte and staccato. Djiovanis argues that the wide range covered by the oboe line portrays Phaeton's horses bursting through the clouds, while Mattson connects its erratic rising and falling to the movement of Phaeton's chariot and links the gradual complication of the thirds-based harmony to Phaeton's increasing nervousness. Measures 16–18 feature G^{7} chords, which act as a dominant leading into the B section.

The B section, in contrast, is slurred and piano, and its key of C Lydian is enforced by the presence of frequent F♯s. Rather than rising, the passage maintains a high range and remains within C_{5} and C_{6}; Mattson links the range to the chariot's altitude and the lighter dynamic and articulation to Phaeton's paralyzing fear. The section begins by outlining triads centered at C and D but at a certain point becomes more harmonically unstable; Djiovanis links this development with the moment in which a frightened Phaeton loses control of the chariot. Mattson, meanwhile, interprets a pause between the B and C sections as the exact moment in which Phaeton drops the reins.

The C section (or reprised A section) returns to the forte and staccato intensity of the A section, augmented by a new tempo marking of agitato. The first phrase of the C section matches the G octatonic arpeggios at the start of the piece, except that the first three notes are raised by a whole step; this muddies the harmony by mixing the F♯ from the B section with the B♭ from the A section and, in Biggam's words, makes the melody more "menacing". As Britten introduces notes from outside the octatonic scale, the tonal center is abandoned, a development that ultimately culminates in an ascending chromatic scale. Meanwhile, Britten gradually truncates the arpeggios and scatters the beginnings of phrases so that they no longer match the measure divisions. Mattson argues that these complications portray the free horses' erratic movements through the sky. The C section climaxes with a first-inversion dominant seventh arpeggio starting on a low B♭: the oboe's lowest note; this arpeggio, in quarter notes, is a rhythmic augmentation of the movement's recurring motif. Caird links this arpeggio to the moment Phaethon plunges back to Earth.

After a measure of rest, the movement closes with a brief coda of four measures, which resembles the B section in its range, dynamics, and articulation. Djiovanis proposes several programmatic interpretations of the coda, ranging from Phaethon hurtling down to the Padus River to his funeral by his nymph sisters. Mattson observes harmonic ambiguity in the coda, which is largely in A major but features the B♭ from the A section.Finally, a clear cadence into C major at the end resolves the ambiguity and, in Mattson's view, represents the restoration of order as Jupiter strikes Phaethon with his thunderbolt.

=== III. Niobe ===
"Niobe" starts Andante with expressive indication piangendo, which translates to "plaintive" or "crying". According to Biggam, "Niobe" is the most conventional movement of Six Metamorphoses because it is firmly in the key of D♭ major, features cadences involving the second and fifth scale degrees, and ends on the tonic. The movement, which has a 4/4 time signature in parentheses, largely retains simple meter, though it resembles compound meter in some emotionally charged moments. "Niobe" is written in ternary form, and both the A and B sections are primarily based on the main theme from the first two sections. Caird claims that Britten's choice to write Six Metamorphoses for solo oboe is fitting for Niobe's story due to the fact that the aulos, an ancient Greek antecedent of the oboe, was often used in tragedy. Djiovanis finds the key of D♭ major fitting since it is mostly covered on the oboe, resulting in a muted and more mournful sound.

The A section opens with the main theme of the movement. The oboe plays a slurred downward D♭ major arpeggio (F, D♭, and A♭). Then the note A appears in the theme, which is shortly after resolved to an A♭ through an appoggiatura. Djiovanis compares the downward arpeggio to weeping and the appoggiatura to a sigh, while Mattson describes the effect of the juxtaposed A and A♭ as "melancholy". Then, Britten includes two similar phrases, all including consonant descending patterns, dissonant ascending patterns, and a downward resolution. The first two phrases of the A section include six distinct notes each, while the third includes a seventh; following analysis by Mulder, Djiovanis notes a possible connection with Ovid's narrative, in which six of Niobe's sons are brutally slain while the seventh is nearly saved, though Mattson dissents. The A section ends in the Phrygian mode, which Djiovanis, following Hiramoto, connects to Niobe's own Phrygian origin.

The B section, from measures 10 to 20, offers a rhythmically and harmonically complex variation of the opening phrase. Biggam makes notes of increasing harmonic ambiguities in the measures leading up to and at the start of B; these, especially the use of the notes E and G, contribute to the yearning, emotive character of the music. At the end of the B section, the oboe seems to alternate between two melodic lines in a manner reminiscent of the "Narcissus" movement; both of these lines begin in D♭ major and gradually converge on the note C_{5} in C major.

The reprised A section consists of six measures. The first two measures are the same as the beginning of the piece, while the last four measures draw on material from the first phrase rather than other parts of the A section; Djiovanis claims that this sense of stagnation depicts Niobe turning to stone. Meanwhile, Mattson argues that the expressive marking senza espressione, combined with the decrescendo and pianissimo, encourages a musical tone that lacks movement, similarly depicting Niobe's transformation. Finally, the music resolves on a high D♭_{6}.

=== IV. Bacchus ===
"Bacchus" is the longest of all the movements of Six Metamorphoses, taking up two pages of sheet music instead of one. It is written with 4/4 time signature, although the time signature is in parentheses. In reality, the number of beats per measure varies, and Biggam sees the frequent juxtaposition of three- and four-beat measures as depicting drunkenness. "Bacchus" is written in an ABACA rondo form, where the final A section functions as a coda, rather than the usual ternary form; the A section takes the form of a refrain, while the B and C sections represent individual episodes. Likewise, Bacchus is the only movement that does not narrate a single metamorphosis or story, instead painting the broader scene of a Bacchanal.

The A section takes up measures 1–14 and has tempo marking Allegro Pesante; its main melody consists of a slurred dotted rhythm followed by three upward marcato sixteenth notes. The section is itself in binary form, and the key of F major is suggested by the melody, which consists of fragments of diatonic scales. Djiovanis and Mattson both interpret the A section as a musical depiction of Bacchus staggering through his party. In particular, Mattson notes that the emphasis in the main theme on the first of the three sixteenth notes, in addition to the absence of the fourth note, makes the music sound unbalanced; this combines with the frequent rests and fermatas to create a drunken effect. The A section is reprised, although truncated, in measures 25–32; one particular moment in measures 30–31 where the music pauses gives the image of a drunk Bacchus pausing and abruptly switching direction.

The B section is faster (Più vivo); its main theme repeats a staccato motif consisting of two sixteenth notes and three eighth notes and frequently features large jumps. The section is in A major, although the first two measures are harmonically ambiguous. The motif of three sixteenth notes still appears in this section, although the notes are now downward and slurred. Mattson connects the oboe's playful jumps to the playing and "shouting out of boys" mentioned in the epigraph. The C section (Con moto) is faster and requires the oboe to slur alternating third intervals (with some seconds and fourths) at a high register in sixteenth notes. The alternating thirds broadly outline C major triads, though there are hints of a Lydian raised fourth. Mattson links the back-and-forth texture of the oboe line to the epigraph's "noise of women's tattling tongues," whose conversation would merge into a homogeneous background hum.

The coda begins with three low Cs, augmented by fermatas and labeled with the dynamic ffz, an unusual combination of fortissimo and forzando. Each of these is followed by a fast, rising piano arpeggio, with each gesture outlining a distinct chord far away harmonically from C major. Djiovanis and Mattson connect the arpeggios to the sound of Bacchus belching or hiccuping, while Biggam reads the gesture as the "shouting out of boys." The coda then returns to the main theme from A, but in G major, then pivots to C major and A major, thereby harmonically integrating the previous sections. The movement ends with another fermata on low C, followed by an F major "belch" arpeggio ending on a high F_{6}. This gesture is so quick that the listener can hardly perceive the resolution back into the home key of F.

=== V. Narcissus ===
"Narcissus" (Lento piacevole) is written in 6/8; It is the only movement of Six Metamorphoses to have a rigid time signature, which may help portray the rigidity of Narcissus' affection for his reflection.> The music is written in three sections; at the beginning of the second, Britten includes a performance: "From this point the notes with upward stems represent the reflected image of Narcissus, and those with downward stems Narcissus himself." The "Narcissus" movement is notable for its ability to portray a polyphonic structure with only one instrumental line.

The first section (1–9) represents Narcissus himself through a descending melody, written in an ambiguous mixture of A♭ major and F minor. The melody features motifs that resemble trills, though these are precisely written out as sextuplets and ought to be played exactly. Mattson argues that these rhythmically regulated trills further portray the rigidity of the pool of water while also preserving the emotional impact of the few moments where the oboe produces genuine trills. These trill figures may also represent sighs or ripples in the water or, later, the larger perturbations that obscure Narcissus' reflection. The melody ascends through a series of regulated trills, culminating with a real trill; Britten leaves the culminating trill unresolved, which Mattson connects with Narcissus' unresolved sexual tension.

The second section (10–23) begins by repeating the first section, except each of Narcissus' motifs is now followed by a second line representing his reflection, responding in counterpoint to the melody. Initially, the reflection's line is an exact inversion of Narcissus' melody; however, as the piece goes on, Britten represents reflection harmonically by using parallel and relative minors. Each of these reflections either truncates or elongates the melody, possibly mimicking the way in which the reflected pool distorts the image. Mattson connects the first instance of a non-exact inversion to the moment when Narcissus recognizes himself in the pool; after this, he perceives the reflection as himself, and the second line plays echoes and transpositions rather than inversions. The two lines gradually get closer together and converge on a series of thirty-second notes surrounding a B–C♯–D♯–E tetrachord, then a C♯–D♯ trill, at which point they can no longer be distinguished from each other. Then follows a coda with tempo marking tranquillo. Biggam perceives the coda's key, C major, as the result of the flats of the earlier melody cancelling with the sharps created through the inversion. Rather than being in counterpoint, the two lines now compose different notes in the same single melody. Eventually, the upper voice disappears, leaving behind a dotted rhythm reminiscent of the theme from "Bacchus", possibly representing Narcissus' new existence as a flower.

=== VI. Arethusa ===
"Arethusa" is written with a strict 3/8 time signature, occasionally switching to 2/8 and 5/8. The piece is able to maintain a feeling of freedom through tenuto marks, fermatas on rests between phrases, and direction to play espressivo; the tenuto marks initially emphasize the first note on each measure, but Britten plays with syncopation later in the piece. "Arethusa" is written in ternary form, though Britten includes a short alternate ending after the A section.

The A section (Largamente) is composed of downward cascading arpeggioesque figures, each consisting of six slurred sixteenth notes. Each phrase consists of a bar line, and each individual cascade takes up one measure. The first of these phrases centered about D major, with added sharps hinting at the Lydian mode; the end of this phrase reaches F♯ major, facilitating a modulation into a second B major phrase. Then, a G major phrase, in which the length of each cascade decreases from six notes to three or four or five, quickening the harmonic rhythm. The section culminates with four downward bursts of thirty-second notes. The first of these (an F♯ minor 9th chord) deviates from the established harmony and is left unresolved; the others settle back into D major. Biggam compares these bursts to Arethusa's flight, while Mattson links them, especially the first, to her cries of distress.

The B section (poco più lento) is much more chromatic than the A section and invokes an octatonic scale. The note B♭, along with other flat notes, frequently interrupts the key of D major. The section is composed largely of descending quarter and eighth notes, with trills; Biggam, following Hiramoto, imagines these trills as the trickling of water, while Mattson more specifically imagines Arethusa hiding in a cloud. Between the trills are sixteenth arpeggios reminiscent of the A section, but this time upward and culminating in rests; Mattson describes them as "interrogatory" and imagines Arethusa wondering what is happening to her during her transformation.

The reprised A section (animando) begins with repeated slurred measures of sixteenth notes, but this time the phrases' contours are more complicated; the sixteenth notes bubble up and down rather than descending, which Mattson compares to a fountain. Eventually, this bubbling returns to the original downward motif, and the movement energetically and definitively finishes with a cascade of multi-octave fortissimo D major arpeggios. This ending is comparable with the endings of Phantasy Quartet and Temporal Variations, all finishing on the oboe's fundamental pitch of D.

== Recordings ==
Six Metamorphoses was recorded on 3 October 1952 by Joy Boughton, the oboist for whom the piece was composed, as part of a broadcast by the BBC; in this recording, the "Niobe" and "Bacchus" movements are switched. Boughton broadcast the piece again in December 1953, but this performance was interrupted by an announcer. Shortly after, the piece was recorded by Sarah Francis, a friend of Boughton's, who studied the piece with Britten and was asked by him to perform it at the Aldeburgh Festival; around this time, she recorded it. Heinz Holliger and Janet Craxton, both oboists with whom Britten was familiar, also recorded the piece.The latter, similar to Boughton, was especially keen to accurately preserve the intricate performance details Britten wrote into his score; Indeed, Britten was appreciative of Craxton's performance and wrote to her in 1976, "As I thought all along, my choice of you to record these two pieces was an excellent one and I can tell you that I was delighted with what I heard." A very famous recording has been released by American oboist John Mack, and several recordings have been released by French oboist François Leleux, the latter notable for a liberal use of rubato. Marilyn Zupnick has released an album of several prominent oboe etudes, and she has attached a recording of Six Metamorphoses as a pedagogical tool to illustrate the application of techniques from the other pieces.

== Sources ==
- Ovid's Metamorphoses: A New Translation. Translated by Soucy, C. Luke. Oakland, California: Univ of California Press. 7 November 2023. ISBN 978-0-520-39485-8.
- Biggam, Vincent Mark (2001). Benjamin Britten’s four chamber works for oboe (Doctor of Musical Arts thesis). Performance Studies Division of the College-Conservatory of Music, University of Cincinnati.
- Mattson, Sheri Lee (2000). An analysis of Benjamin Britten's six metamorphoses after Ovid, opus 49, for solo oboe (Thesis). Florida State University. OCLC 45740459.
- Caird, George (2009). "Six Metamorphoses after Ovid and the Influence of Classical Mythology on Benjamin Britten". In Walker, Lucy (ed.). Benjamin Britten: New Perspectives on his Life and Work. Woodbridge: Boydell & Brewer. doi:10.1017/9781846156946.005. ISBN 978-1-84383-516-5.
- Caird, George (2017). "Britten Six Metamorphoses after Ovid: Anatomy of a Masterpiece" (PDF). Oboe Classics.
- "Benjamin Britten – Six Metamorphoses after Ovid". www.boosey.com.
- Djiovanis, Sotos G. (2005). The Oboe Works of Benjamin Britten (Doctor of Music thesis). College of Music, Florida State University.
