= Fergus and Judith Wilson =

UK's largest buy-to-let investors

Fergus Wilson (born 1948 or 1949) and Judith Wilson are a British married couple who were among the UK's largest buy-to-let investors. At peak, they owned approximately 1,000 two- and three-bedroom properties around Ashford and Maidstone in Kent.

In 2008 they were listed at #453 on The Sunday Times "rich list", with a fortune of £180 million. By 2019 it was incorrectly reported that they had sold all their properties, however in 2022 in the High Court, Ashford Borough Council secured a permanent freezing Injunction against Fergus Wilson, the effect of which prevents him from disposing of assets, including in the form of five named properties. The Council took the action because Mr Wilson defaulted on three Court judgements relating to the payment of legal costs. Mr Wilson and his wife were rapidly disposing of their assets and the Council believed there was a real risk that the costs orders of the court would go unsatisfied.

== Property investment ==
The Wilsons were previously maths teachers. They relied heavily on borrowings to build their portfolio, buying only new-build houses and remortgaging them as soon as prices went up, using the paper profits to finance further purchases.

In September 2009 it was reported in The Times that they planned to sell their entire portfolio.

In January 2014 Fergus Wilson sent eviction notices to every tenant who received government-funded housing benefit and alerted letting agents that he would no longer accept tenants on housing benefit. This amounted to at least 200 evictions.

In December 2015, they claimed to have sold their entire portfolio to a consortium of overseas investors for around £250 million.

On 7 January 2017 Fergus Wilson announced that he would no longer accept tenants who were victims of domestic abuse, claiming that victims of domestic violence often have partners who ruin his properties. He also banned plumbers from becoming tenants.

In 2017 a court ruled his ban on "coloured" tenants was unlawful. His complaint centered around "curry smells" left by Asian tenants. Fergus Wilson represented himself in court offering up various defences from "it was banter" to actively defending the right of landlords to refuse people based on their ethnicity.

In 2019 the Wilsons were subject of a BBC Panorama documentary titled "Britain's Most Controversial Landlord".

In 2023, Judith Wilson sued Tonbridge and Malling Borough Council after the council had carried out remedial works on a dangerous building owned by Mrs Wilson. She argued that the work had left the building an "eyesore". Mrs Wilson lost the case and was ordered to pay £166,000 to the council, including the costs of the remedial work, interest, and legal fees.

== Legal matters ==
In 2008, Fergus Wilson was found guilty of using a mobile phone while driving and fined £565 and had his licence endorsed with three points. He had pleaded not guilty and claimed that he had been singing into a drinks carton that he was holding to the side of his head.

In 2014, Fergus Wilson was found guilty of assaulting an estate agent.

In January 2018, Wilson threatened to 'snooker' YouTube comedian Danny Hyde by suing him for £10,000 under the Malicious Communications Act 1988 over a video in which Hyde referred to Wilson as a 'bumsplat of a man', on account of Wilson's 'racist' policy of denying 'coloured' tenants because they 'leave a curry smell behind'. A Crowd Funding campaign was set up to cover Hyde's court costs.

In November 2019 Fergus Wilson was convicted of using racially aggravated words and behaviour, after being caught on camera abusing a Slovakian traffic warden.

== Outside property ==
The couple have owned racehorses, an activity that earned them some criticism as they persistently entered 'no-hoper', low-quality racehorses in top races - such as their entry of the 'worst racehorse in history' into The Derby, as well as similar entries in the Gold Cup, Grand National and Champion Hurdle.

Fergus Wilson initially proposed to stand as an independent candidate in the 2012 elections for the Police and Crime Commissioner of Kent Police, but in the end did not stand. On 3 August 2015 he told Channel 4 News that he intended to stand for Police and Crime Commissioner in Kent in 2016, but newspaper reports suggested that he would be ineligible to stand due to his assault conviction. On 7 April 2016 Fergus Wilson's nomination for the post of Police and Crime Commissioner was rejected by the Returning Officer.
