= Joy Boughton =

English oboist (1913–1963)

Christina Joyance Boughton A.R.C.M. (known as Joy) (14 June 1913 – 9 March 1963) was an English oboist and the daughter of composer Rutland Boughton and artist Christina Walshe. She died in 1963 in tragic circumstances.

She was taught oboe by Léon Goossens and attended the Royal College of Music from 1929 to 1937 at which, for a short while before her death, she was a professor of Oboe. She helped establish Benjamin Britten's English Opera Group, being a member of its orchestra in the late 1940s and 1950s. In 1951 Britten dedicated his Six Metamorphoses after Ovid to Joy, which she premiered at the Aldeburgh Festival on 14 June that year. Together with John Francis (flute) and Millicent Silver (piano) she became part of The Sylvan Trio.

In 1937, Joy gave the first performance of the Oboe Concerto written specially for her by Rutland Boughton at a concert in Oxford with the Boyd Neel String Orchestra. She was married to the theatre impresario Christopher Ede and they had two children, Robin and Penny. A concert in her memory was held at the RCM in April 1963 in which the performers were: John Francis, Sarah Francis and Millicent Silver; Denis Matthews, Leon Goossens, Evelyn Rothwell and Edward Selwyn.

== Further details ==
- Francis, Sarah (February 2004). "Joy Boughton - A portrait". Double Reed News. Archived from the original on 1 December 2008.
- Caird, George (Autumn 2006). "Benjamin Britten and his Metamorphosis". Double Reed Society (76).
