= Boughton Green =

Coordinates: 51.23°N 00.51°E

- Location within Kent
- OS grid reference: TQ7651
- Civil parish: Loose
- District: Maidstone
- Shire county: Kent
- Region: South East
- Country: England
- Sovereign state: United Kingdom
- Post town: Maidstone
- Postcode district: ME17 4
- Police: Kent
- Fire: Kent
- Ambulance: South East Coast
- UK Parliament: Faversham and Mid Kent

Boughton Green, part of the village of Boughton Monchelsea, is in Kent, England. It lies to the NE of the village centre. In the 2011 census, the population was included in the civil parish of Boughton Monchelsea.
