= Oboe Sonata (Howells) =

Sonata for oboe and piano by Herbert Howells

Herbert Howells completed his Oboe Sonata in 1942. Rejected by its planned dedicatee Léon Goossens, the composition was suppressed and not performed in public until after the composer's death in 1983.

== History ==
The precise circumstances under which Howells began and composed the sonata for oboe and piano are unknown. The surviving copy of the manuscript indicates that the sonata was completed on 27 August 1942 and that it was intended for Léon Goossens. Goossens, when interviewed about the sonata in 1986, could only recall that he had expressed reservations about the work's structure. Howells had then responded to the effect that he would "have another go at it" and took the manuscript with him.

It is not clear what happened next, but it is widely believed that the composer's later clarinet sonata resulted from attempts at revising the oboe sonata.

The work was rediscovered in 1978 by author Christopher Palmer, at that time working on a biography of Howells. (Note: Herbert Howells: A Study, 1978) Palmer obtained permission to photocopy the manuscript score, and while not discussing the work in the resulting biography, did list the sonata as one of the composer's principal works.

Following the composer's death an attempt was made to locate the original manuscript, but it had apparently become lost some time after Palmer made his photocopy. A performing score was prepared and the work premiered to the public by oboist Sarah Francis and pianist Peter Dickinson on 9 July 1984 at the Cheltenham Music Festival, with the London premiere taking place on 4 October of the same year. A recording was made by Hyperion Records in 1985 and publication by Novello followed in 1986.

== Structure ==
The sonata, while it is nominally structured in four movements, is effectively a two-movement work with the first movement directly linked to the second and the third movement directly linked to the fourth:

1. Placido, teneramente, ma con moto – Lento, assai espressivo e tranquillo
2. Allegro mosso, scherzando – Epliogue: Tranquillo, mesto, ma con moto

Since the work was rediscovered, there has been speculation about just what it was that caused Goossens to reject the sonata. In looking at the later clarinet sonata, both Huss and the anonymous author of the liner notes to the Hyperion recording comment that while both compositions share structural and rhythmic similarities, the clarinet sonata represents a simplification and clarification over the earlier work. Huss further speculates that as he started the process of revision Howells may have decided that in attempting to write a composition that would challenge Goossens skills as an oboist, he had in fact written beyond the capabilities of the oboe as he perceived them. The author of the Hyperion liner notes comments that in their opinion that the ending of the composition, which recapitulates material from the first two movements may have been a miscalculation on the composers part.

Huss further notes that while the first movement of the sonata is entirely original material, the second through fourth movements quote from the composers then unpublished setting of "Oh Garlands, Hanging by the Door", composed in 1921. (Note: The song was published along with several others by Novello in 2013.) Huss speculates that this was done because the music quoted created a specific atmosphere the composer wanted the piece to express. Sorrels in their thesis comments that this relationship was apparently not known when the work was published. (Note: It's not mentioned in the liner notes to the Hyperion recording.) He also notes that while Huss's speculation is attractive, it does require that certain assumptions to be made about how the work was composed and that the composer himself left no clue.

== Notes and references ==
Notes

Sources

- Anon. (1999). Music for Oboe (PDF) (CD). Hyperion Records. CDH55008.
- Huss, Fabian (2013). "Chapter 9: Style and Structure in the Oboe Sonata and Clarinet Sonata". In Cooke, Phillip A.; Maw, David (eds.). The Music of Herbert Howells. Boydell & Brewer. ISBN 978-1-84383-8791.
- Sorrels, Keith (26 October 2018). Thematic continuity and melodic recycling in Herbert Howells's sonata for oboe and piano (D. Mus.). Indiana University.
