= Boughton baronets =

Topics referred to by the same term

There have been two baronetcies created for the surname Boughton, later Rouse-Boughton family, one in the Baronetage of England and one in the Baronetage of Great Britain. Both are extinct.

- Boughton baronets of Lawford (1641)
- Boughton-Rouse baronets, then Rouse-Boughton baronets of Rouse Lench (1791), united with the 1642 creation in 1794.
