= New House Hotel =

Country house in Cardiff, Wales

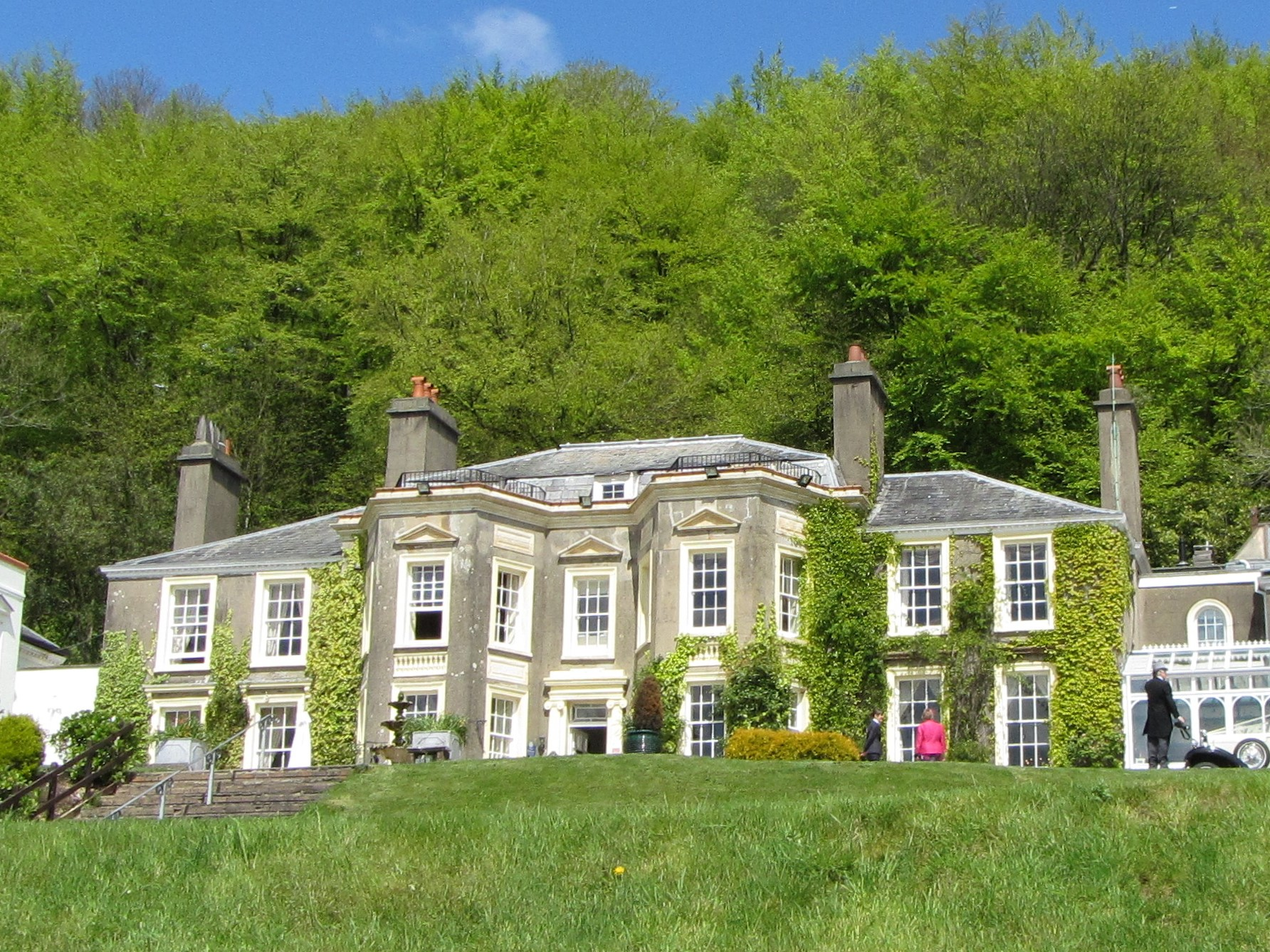

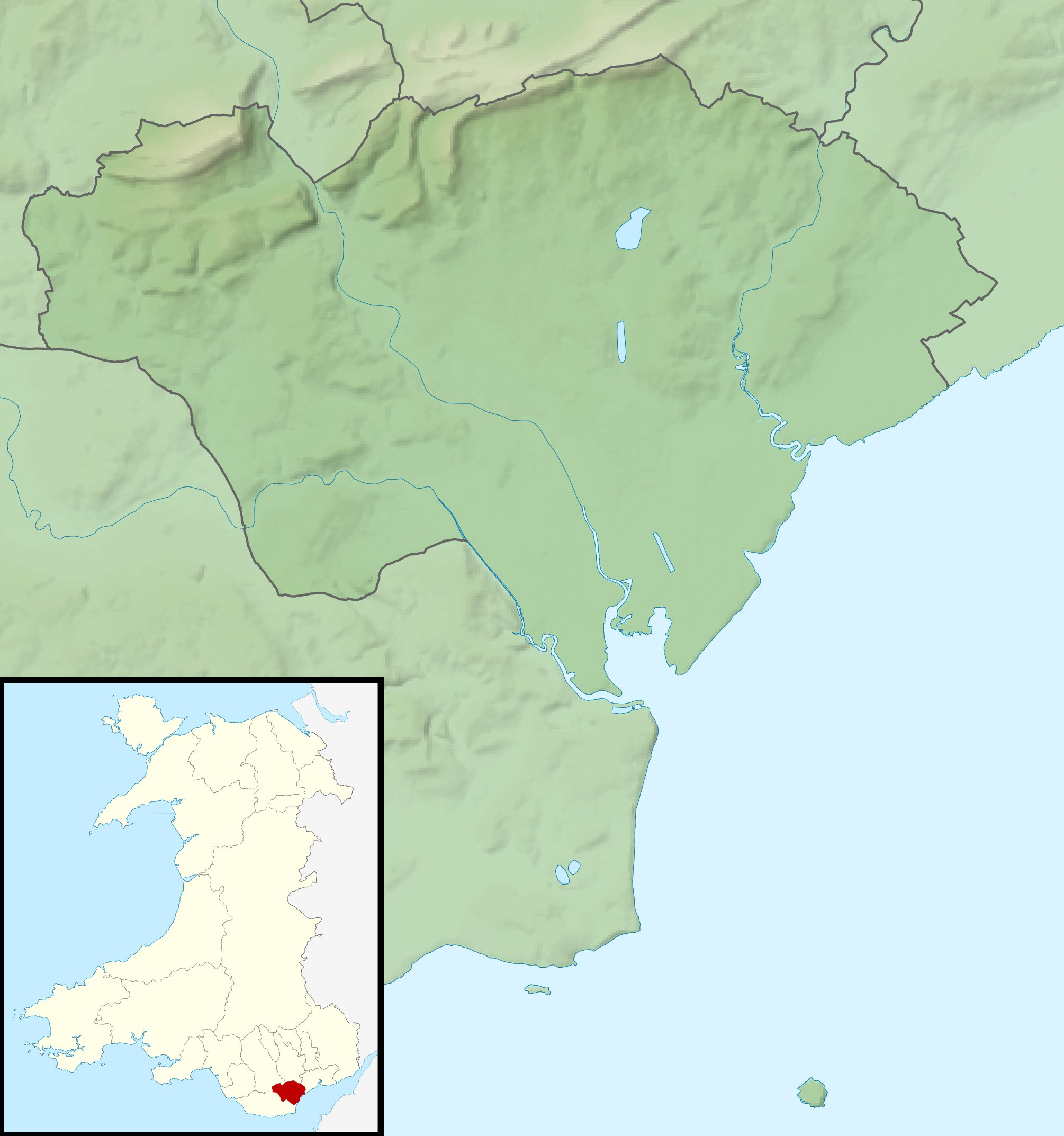
- Location within Cardiff
- 51.5498°N 3.2128°W
- Type: House (now a hotel)
- Location: Thornhill, Cardiff, Glamorgan

History
- Built: c.1795

Site notes
- Architectural style: Neoclassical
- Owner: Privately owned

Listed Building – Grade II*
- Official name: New House Hotel
- Designated: 10 June 1977
- Reference no.: 13937

Listed Building – Grade II
- Official name: The Long Barn and attached courtyard wall, gates and railings
- Designated: 11 June 1977
- Reference no.: 15758

New House Hotel is a former country house, now a hotel, in Thornhill, Cardiff, Wales. Dating from around 1795, it was built for Thomas Lewis, a descendant of Thomas Lewis (died 1764), a founder of the Dowlais Ironworks and prominent local landowner through his own descent from the Lewises of Van. The original Thomas Lewis built a mansion near the site which was destroyed by fire in the mid-18th century and the present building was its replacement. New House Hotel is a Grade II* listed building.

== History ==
The Lewises of Van descended from Sir Edward Lewis (1508–1561). Establishing himself at The Van, south of Caerphilly, Sir Edward built up a large landholding in Glamorgan, serving as Sheriff in 1548, 1555, and 1559. A descendant, Thomas Lewis (1699–1764) was the original founder of the Dowlais Ironworks which he began as the Methir Furnace, and later converted to the Dowlais Works in partnership with seven others in 1759. Lewis built himself a mansion near the Thornhill site overlooking Cardiff but this was destroyed by fire after his death and the present replacement was constructed by his descendant, another Thomas, in around 1795.

New House was converted to a hotel in the 20th century.

== Architecture and description ==
The building is of two storeys and seven bays, with attics, under a Welsh slate roof. The architectural historian John Newman, in his Glamorgan volume of the Buildings of Wales, describes the façade as "strangely gauche". The house is listed at Grade II*. The Long Barn (formerly the stables) is also listed at II. The Royal Commission on the Ancient and Historical Monuments of Wales also holds details of the house's garden wall, the gate piers and railings, and the stables on its Coflein database.

== Sources ==
- Newman, John (1995). Glamorgan. The Buildings of Wales. London, UK: Penguin Books. ISBN 978-0-140-71056-4. OCLC 33858574.
