= Thomas Lewis (industrialist) =

Founder of the Dowlais Ironworks

Thomas Lewis (died 1764) was one of the founders of the Dowlais Ironworks, one of the largest ironworks in Wales.

== Career ==
Born into a landed family from Llanishen, Cardiff, a branch of the Lewis of the Van Family, Thomas Lewis became an iron-master. He already owned the Pentyrch blast furnace and several small forges when he became a partner in Dowlais Ironworks in 1759. Lewis was the partner who arranged the mineral leases and construction of the new ironworks: the works were carried out by his business, Thomas Lewis & Co. He headed the business and his family interest was not bought out until 1848.

He was also a partner in the firm of Coles, Lewis & Co which had interests at Melin-y-cwrt and Ynys-y-gerwn.

Lewis's family had lived at Llanishen for many generations and he was responsible for building the New House in neighbouring Thornhill. He was clearly a highly respected individual and served as High Sheriff of Glamorgan in 1757.

He died in 1764.
