= Wyndham Lewis (disambiguation) =

Wyndham Lewis may refer to:

- Percy Wyndham Lewis (1882–1957), English artist and writer
- Wyndham Lewis (politician) (1780 – 1838), British MP whose widow married Disraeli
- D. B. Wyndham Lewis (1891 – 1969), British humourist and biographer
