= George Thomas Clark =

British surgeon and engineer (1809–1898)

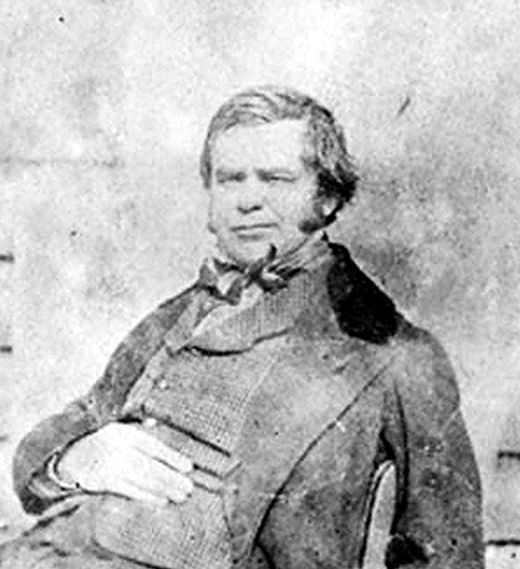
- G.T. Clark by Arthur Vivian, 1854
- Born: 26 May 1809; Chelsea, London
- Died: 31 January 1898 (aged 88)
- Engineering career
- Discipline: Civil engineering
- Institutions: Royal College of Surgeons

Colonel George Thomas Clark (26 May 1809 – 31 January 1898) was a British surgeon and engineer. He was particularly associated with the management of the Dowlais Iron Company. He was also an antiquary and historian of Glamorgan.

== Biography ==
Clark was born in Chelsea, London, the eldest son of the Revd George Clark (1777–1848), chaplain to the Royal Military Asylum, Chelsea, and Clara, née Dicey. He was educated at Charterhouse School then articled to a surgeon, Sir Patrick Macgregor, in 1825 and later to George Gisborne Babington. Clark became a member of the Royal College of Surgeons in 1832. Clark opened a practice in Bristol.

By the mid-1830s, Clark was in the employ of Isambard Kingdom Brunel as an engineer on the construction of the Great Western and Taff Vale Railways. His position was a senior one with overall responsibility for some stretches of the line and for civil structures. Involvement in major earth-moving works seems to have fed his interest in geology and archaeology and he, anonymously, authored two guidebooks on the railway, in addition to a critique of Brunel's methods, which was published in Gentleman's Magazine in 1895.

From 1843 to 1847, Clark worked on the Great Indian Peninsula Railway, surveying and planning the first passenger line in India, from Bombay to Thana which was opened in 1852. On his return to England, he published a report on the geology of the region

In 1855 Clark took control of Dowlais Ironworks. Clark's wife, was a descendant of Thomas Lewis, one of the original Dowlais Ironworks partners. The family's interests in the firm had been passed to John Josiah Guest, who after his death named Clark among the trustees. When Guest's widow Lady Charlotte Guest remarried in 1855, de facto control fell on Clark. In 1876 he was also president of the British Iron Trade Association.

In 1850, Clark married Ann Price Lewis. The Clarks had a son and a daughter. In 1865, Clark purchased Tal-y-garn Manor, a small property near Llantrisant, Glamorgan, and set about building an estate of some 924 acres (3.74 km^{2}) with the intention of founding a landed dynasty. His wife Ann died in 1885. Clark died in 1898 at Tal-y-garn and was buried there. His wealth at death was £333,305 (£27 million at 2003 prices).

However, the dynasty did not thrive and most of the land was sold off shortly after the death of his son in 1918. The main house later became a miners' hospital and was eventually converted into apartments.

== Work ==
=== Dowlais Ironworks ===
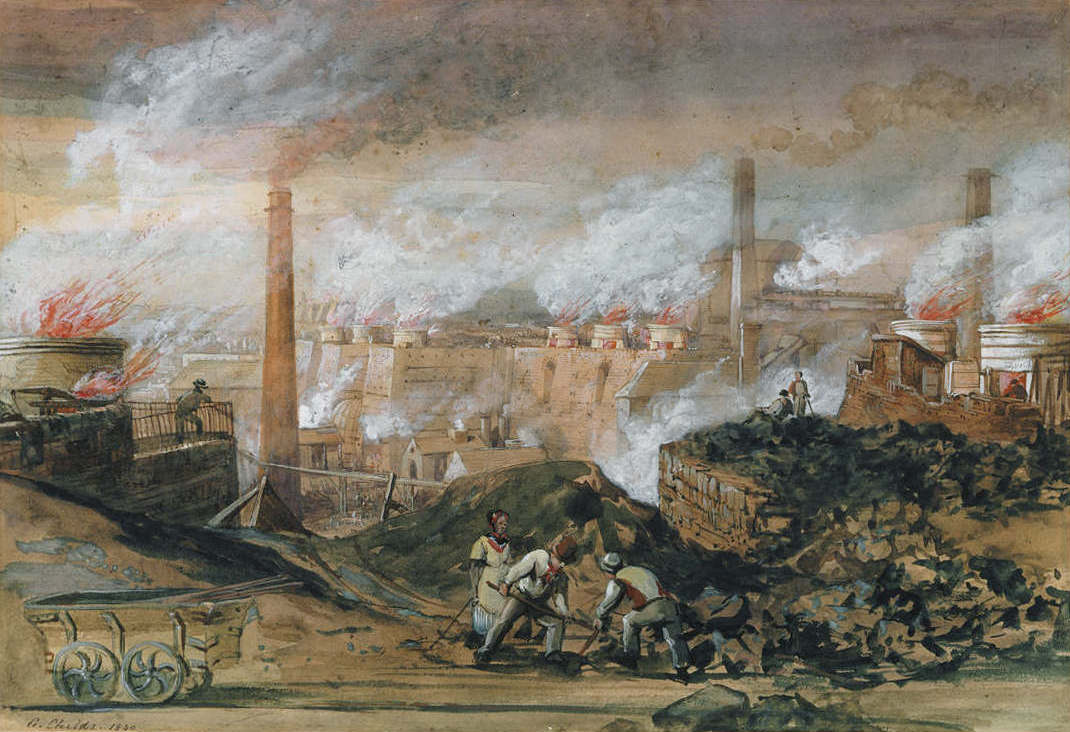
Dowlais Ironworks by G. Childs, 1840

In 1855 Clark took control of Dowlais Ironworks. The works had been, for a while, in some decline and Clark took rapid steps to improve management controls, attracting additional capital and persuading Henry Austin Bruce to share with him the responsibility of the trusteeship. Clark took up his residence at Dowlais and devoted all his energies to the development of the works and the redemption of the estate. As Bruce devoted himself to politics, the whole responsibility of management devolved on Clark alone, whose rare capacity for administration was displayed no less by his rapid mastery of a complicated situation than by his wise selection of heads of departments, chief among whom was his general manager, William Menelaus.

By the mid-1860s, Clark's reforms had borne fruit in renewed profitability and he was rewarded with an annual salary of £3,500 and five percent of the profits. Clark and Menelaus invited Henry Bessemer to Dowlais, where he perfected his process for making malleable iron direct from the ore. Dowlais became a centre of innovation, and, though the Bessemer process was licensed in 1856, nine years of detailed planning and project management were needed before the first steel was produced. The company thrived with its new cost-effective production methods, forming alliances with the Consett Iron Company and Krupp.

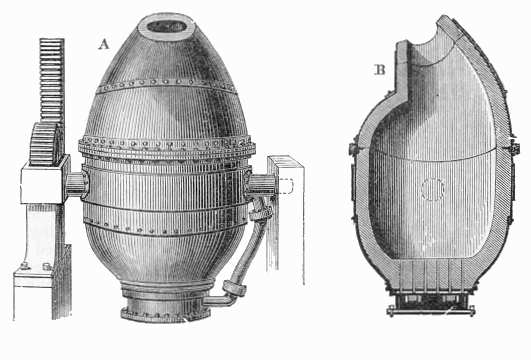
Bessemer converter, schematic diagram

Dowlais was soon first in the field in the production of steel rails, and for some time held a monopoly of that trade in Wales. The consequent expansion of the industry, and the difficulty of procuring an adequate supply of suitable ores at home, led Clark, in conjunction with the Consett Iron Company and Messrs. Krupp of Essen, to acquire an extensive tract of iron-ore deposits near Bilbao in Spain. To render the works independent of the vicissitudes of the coal trade he also purchased large coal areas, undeveloped for the most part, in Glamorganshire.

As his wealth grew, he delegated the day-to-day management to Menelaus, his trusteeship terminating in 1864 when ownership passed to Sir Ivor Guest. However, Clark continued to direct policy, in particular, building a new plant at the docks at Cardiff and vetoing a joint-stock company. Under his regime Dowlais became in effect a great training school which supplied to similar undertakings elsewhere a much larger number of managers and leading men than any other iron or steel works in the country. Finally, he procured the establishment, in 1888–91, of furnaces and mills in connection with Dowlais, on the seaboard at Cardiff, which reduced transport costs considerably but, eventually, led to the decline of Dowlais as an industrial centre. He was induced by Lord Wimborne to continue his administration of the Dowlais undertakings down to the end of March 1897 He formally retired in 1897.

=== Antiquary ===
Clark published in six volumes Cartae et Alia Munimenta Quae ad Dominium de Glamorgancia Pertinent ("Charters and Other Muniments which Pertain to the Lordship of Glamorgan"). This work reconstructed much of the mediaeval history and genealogical information of Glamorgan and much of the later history up to the 16th century. It consists of transcripts of some 1,660 ancient charters, numbered in Roman numerals, in their original language and spelling, which Clark had searched out from various sources including the muniments of Margam Abbey and Ewenny Priory.

His familiarity with the names of old Glamorgan led him to produce another great work, on Welsh genealogy, Limbus Patrum Morganiae et Glamorganiae: Being the Genealogies of the Older Families of the Lordships of Morgan and Glamorgan.

=== Public service ===
Clark took little interest in party politics but was an opponent of protectionism and served on a royal commission on the coal trade (1866–1871). He was exceptional among nineteenth century industrialists in that he earnestly studied the social well-being of his workers. At his own expense he provided a hospital for the Dowlais workmen, while the Dowlais schools, the largest in the kingdom, owed their success almost entirely to his direction. He was an early supporter of the volunteer movement, and himself raised a battalion in the Dowlais district. He was chairman of every local authority in the place, and his manifold services in the work of local government are commemorated by a marble bust, the work of Joseph Edwards, placed in the board-room of the Merthyr poor-law guardians.

He was an active citizen in Merthyr Tudful, his offices and duties include having chaired the Board of Guardians, including the Burial board; School board, working to extend the schools founded by the Guests; and Board of Health. Clark's combined medical and engineering knowledge led to a general interest in public health. He was retained by the General Board of Health and worked on analysing the sanitary condition of towns and villages countrywide.

He supporting places of worship, including the building of St. Mary's Welsh Church. Clark was also Lieutenant-colonel of the 2nd (Dowlais) corps, Glamorgan Rifle Volunteers; a Magistrate; and High Sheriff of Glamorgan (1868).

He opposed incorporation of Merthyr Tudful as he believed it would harm the Dowlais business interests.

Clark died at his home in Talygarn on 31 January 1898, at age 88. Days before he had written a letter to the press about Roman discoveries at Cardiff Castle.

== Publications ==
- George Thomas Clark (1839). A Guidebook to the Great Western Railway. Great Britain: Great Western Railway.
- George Thomas Clark (1846). The History and Description of the Great Western Railway. John Cooke Bourne, illustrator. London.
- George Thomas Clark (1885). Cartae et Alia Munimenta Quae ad Dominium de Glamorgancia Pertinent. Vol. 1. Cardiff: Dowlais.
- George Thomas Clark (1886). Limbus Patrum Morganiae Et Glamorganiae: Being the Genealogies of the Older Families of the Lordships of Morgan and Glamorgan. Wyman & Sons.
- George Thomas Clark (1910). Cartae et Alia Munimenta Quae ad Dominium de Glamorgancia Pertinent. Vol. 2. Cardiff: William Lewis.
- George Thomas Clark (1910). Cartae et Alia Munimenta Quae ad Dominium de Glamorgancia Pertinent. Vol. 3. Cardiff: William Lewis.
- George Thomas Clark (1910). Cartae et Alia Munimenta Quae ad Dominium de Glamorgancia Pertinent. Vol. 4. Cardiff: William Lewis.
- George Thomas Clark (1910). Cartae et Alia Munimenta Quae ad Dominium de Glamorgancia Pertinent. Vol. 5. Cardiff: William Lewis.
- George Thomas Clark (1910). Cartae et Alia Munimenta Quae ad Dominium de Glamorgancia Pertinent. Vol. 6. Cardiff: William Lewis.
