= Disraeli (1978 serial) =

1978 ITV programme based on the life of Disraeli

- DVD cover art
- Screenplay by: David Butler
- Directed by: Claude Whatham
- Starring: Ian McShane
- Theme music composer: Wilfred Josephs
- Country of origin: United Kingdom
- Original language: English
- No. of series: 1
- No. of episodes: 4

Production
- Producer: Cecil Clarke
- Production location: England
- Editor: Al Pigden
- Production company: Associated Television

Original release
- Network: ITV (UK); PBS's Masterpiece Theatre (US)
- Release: 5 September 1978 (UK); 1 June 1980 (US)

Disraeli, also called Disraeli: Portrait of a Romantic, is a 1978 four-part British serial about the great statesman and Prime Minister of the United Kingdom, Benjamin Disraeli. It was produced by Associated Television and aired on ITV.

With a screenplay by David Butler, it stars Ian McShane and was directed by Claude Whatham. Spanning five decades of Disraeli's life, the serial focuses as much on Disraeli's personal life as it does on his political persona.

Filmed on site in England, the miniseries received an Emmy nomination for Outstanding Limited Series after being broadcast in the US in 1980 as part of Masterpiece Theatre under the title Disraeli: Portrait of a Romantic.

== Plot ==
As the series starts, Disraeli is a Byronic world traveler who has published two novels but is struggling with debt. He tries making connections in high society, and eventually runs for office several times, albeit unsuccessfully.

Much of his personal life is covered, and his more successful involvement with politics starts in the second episode, which ends with his being sworn in as Chancellor of the Exchequer.

The rest of the series chronicles his rise to power, the death of his wife, his two terms as Prime Minister, and his rivalry with Gladstone.

== Cast ==
- Ian McShane - as Benjamin Disraeli
- Mary Peach - as Mary Anne Disraeli
- Rosemary Leach - as Queen Victoria
- John Carlisle - as William Ewart Gladstone
- Jeremy Clyde - as John Manners, 7th Duke of Rutland
- Brett Usher - as Edward Bulwer-Lytton, 1st Baron Lytton
- Brewster Mason - as Chancellor Bismarck
- Antony Brown - as Sir Robert Peel
- David de Keyser - as Lionel de Rothschild
- David Wood - as Edward Smith-Stanley, 14th Earl of Derby
- John Gregg - as Robert Cecil, 3rd Marquess of Salisbury
- Brendan Barry - as Stafford Northcote, 1st Earl of Iddesleigh
- Mark Dignam - as John Copley, 1st Baron Lyndhurst
- Patrick Drury - as Montagu Corry, 1st Baron Rowton
- Peter Hughes - as Philip Rose
- Leigh Lawson - as Alfred Guillaume Gabriel, Count D'Orsay
- Peter Miles - as Lord Henry Lennox
- David Riley - as George Smythe, 7th Viscount Strangford
- Anton Rodgers - as Lord George Bentinck
- William Russell - as Wyndham Lewis
- Aubrey Morris - Isaac Disraeli
- Maria Charles - as Maria Disraeli (wife of Isaac Disraeli and mother of Benjamin Disraeli)
- Margaret Whiting - as Lady Blessington
- Patricia Hodge - as Rosina Bulwer Lytton
- Frances Bennett - as Anne Stanhope, Countess of Chesterfield
- Godfrey Quigley - as Daniel O'Connell
- Sheila Ruskin - as Caroline Norton
- Tim Brierley - as Daniel Maclise

== Reception ==
The miniseries was widely praised. The American television magazine Panorama wrote that "McShane captures the inner contradictions of the man" and "It says a lot for Ian McShane's performance in this television series that he brings out both the likeable and the questionable qualities in Disraeli's character."

The miniseries was broadcast in the U.S. on PBS's Masterpiece Theatre in 1980 and was subsequently nominated for the Emmy Award for Outstanding Limited Series.

In 1980 screenwriter David Butler also published a book based on the series, titled Disraeli: Portrait of a Romantic, via Warner Books.
