= St Fagans Castle =

Grade I listed Elizabethan castle

- Castell Sain Ffagan (Welsh)
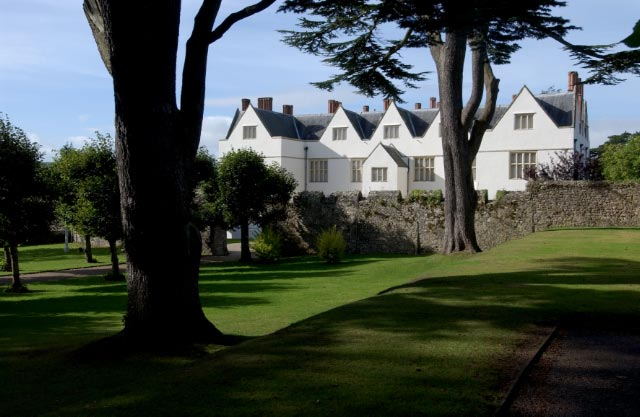
- The approach to St Fagans Castle

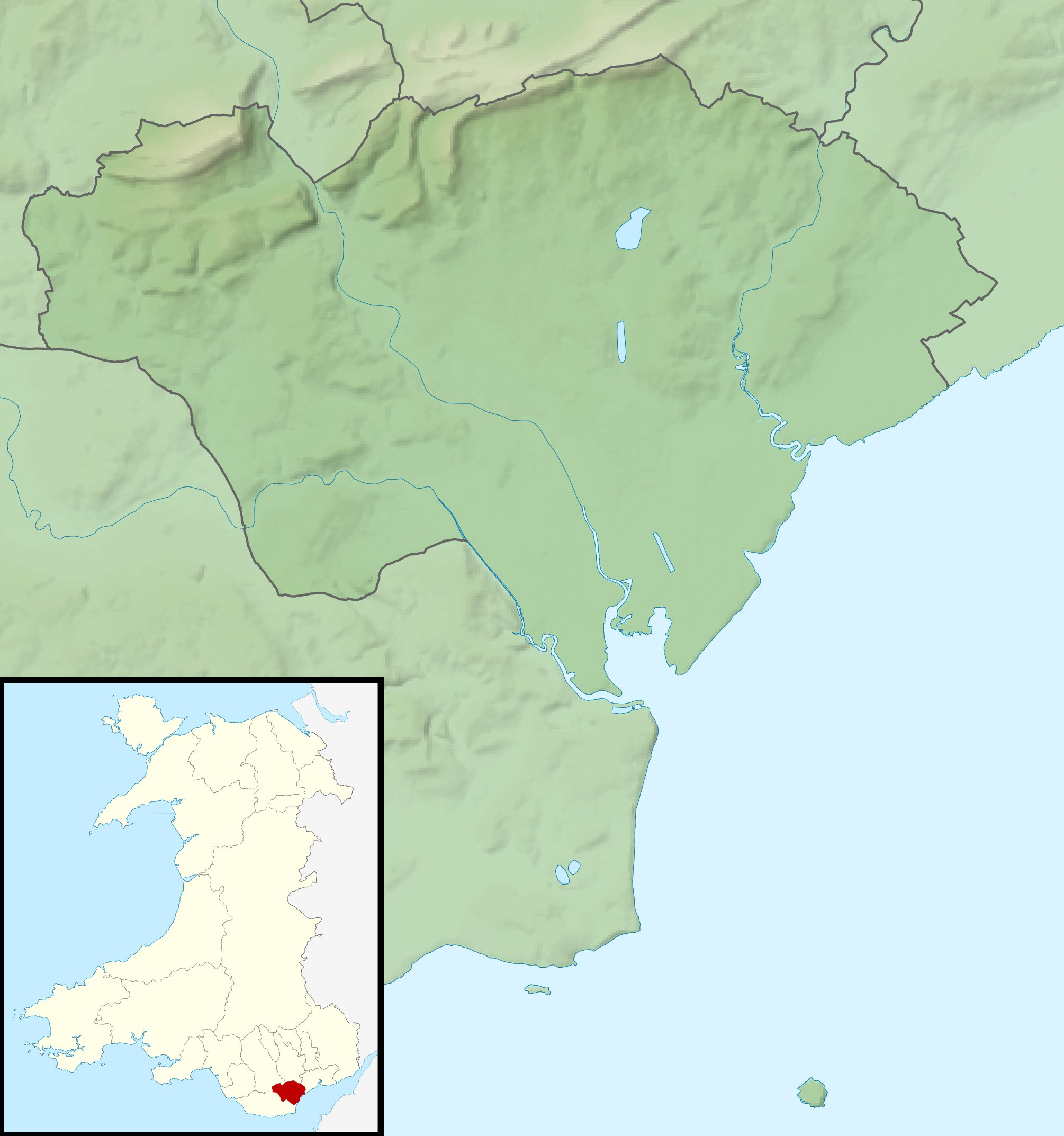
- Location of St Fagans Castle within Cardiff
- 51.4859°N 3.2677°W
- Location: St Fagans, Cardiff, Wales

History
- Built: c. 1580s

Site notes
- Architectural style: Elizabethan

Listed Building – Grade I
- Official name: St Fagans Castle
- Designated: 10 June 1977
- Reference no.: 13888

St Fagans Castle (Welsh: Castell Sain Ffagan) is an Elizabethan mansion in St Fagans, Cardiff, Wales, dating from the late 16th century. The house and remaining medieval fortifications are Grade I listed. The grounds of St Fagans Castle now contain St Fagans National Museum of History. The castle estate is designated Grade I on the Cadw/ICOMOS Register of Parks and Gardens of Special Historic Interest in Wales.

== History ==
A medieval castle dating from the 13th century previously existed on the site. By 1536 it lay in ruins. By 1563 the site had been sold to a Dr John Gibbon. A new house was built on the site either by Gibbon or by Nicholas Herbert, who bought the site from Gibbon in 1586. Part of the D-shaped medieval boundary fortifications remain, forming a wall around the current house.

Sir Edward Lewis of The Van, Caerphilly, bought the house in 1616 from the Herbert family in trust under condition that it remain in the senior male line of the Lewis family forever. Upon the death of Thomas Lewis in 1736 the house was placed into a 2000 year testamantary trust after an act of parliament maintaining the Lewis entails. The interior dates partly from the Lewis reign and partly from after 1850, when in the possession of the Windsor-Clive family. Their ownership began in 1833, when the estate was inherited by Lady Harriet Clive (later the 13th Baroness Windsor), wife of the Hon. Robert Clive. Lady Clive undertook much restoration work spanning several decades. The sequence of terraces in the gardens was created in 1865–6 and extended in the early 20th century. The house became a convalescent hospital for soldiers during World War I, with the banqueting hall containing a ward of 40 beds. In 1947, under the will of Ivor Windsor-Clive, 2nd Earl of Plymouth, the castle and estate were given to the National Museum of Wales.

In 1951, Iorwerth Peate, keeper-in-charge for the castle, was allowed by the Hon. John Morgan to select thirty pieces of furniture from Tredegar House for exhibition in the castle’s period rooms; Morgan was disposing of the contents of Tredegar House following its sale in lieu of death-duties.

Buildings in the grounds accommodate the former Welsh Folk Museum, St Fagans National Museum of History.

=== Historic listing designations ===
The castle has been statutorily recognised and protected in the highest category (Grade I) since 1977. The gardens and grounds are designated Grade I on the Cadw/ICOMOS Register of Parks and Gardens of Special Historic Interest in Wales. A lead water cistern in the courtyard is Grade II* listed, and was brought from Van, a historic home of the Lewis family. Cast in monumental form and bearing the family arms surmounted by a crown, the cistern is ornamented with richly modelled relief panels and the Latin inscription DEVENIENDO. Such cisterns were both functional and symbolic objects in early-seventeenth-century great houses, reflecting wealth, lineage, and continuity of occupation. One decorative panel is deliberately cast inverted, a device commonly used in early-modern ornamental and heraldic contexts as a memento mori, symbolising the transience of worldly power beneath enduring lineage and order. In the context of the Lewis family’s estate culture marked by an emphasis on stewardship, settlement, and long-term continuity the inversion has been interpreted as reinforcing the philosophical theme expressed by DEVENIENDO (“in the course of becoming”), underscoring an understanding of the estate and lineage as unfolding across generations rather than fixed in a single moment. Many garden structures have Grade II status.

== Gallery ==
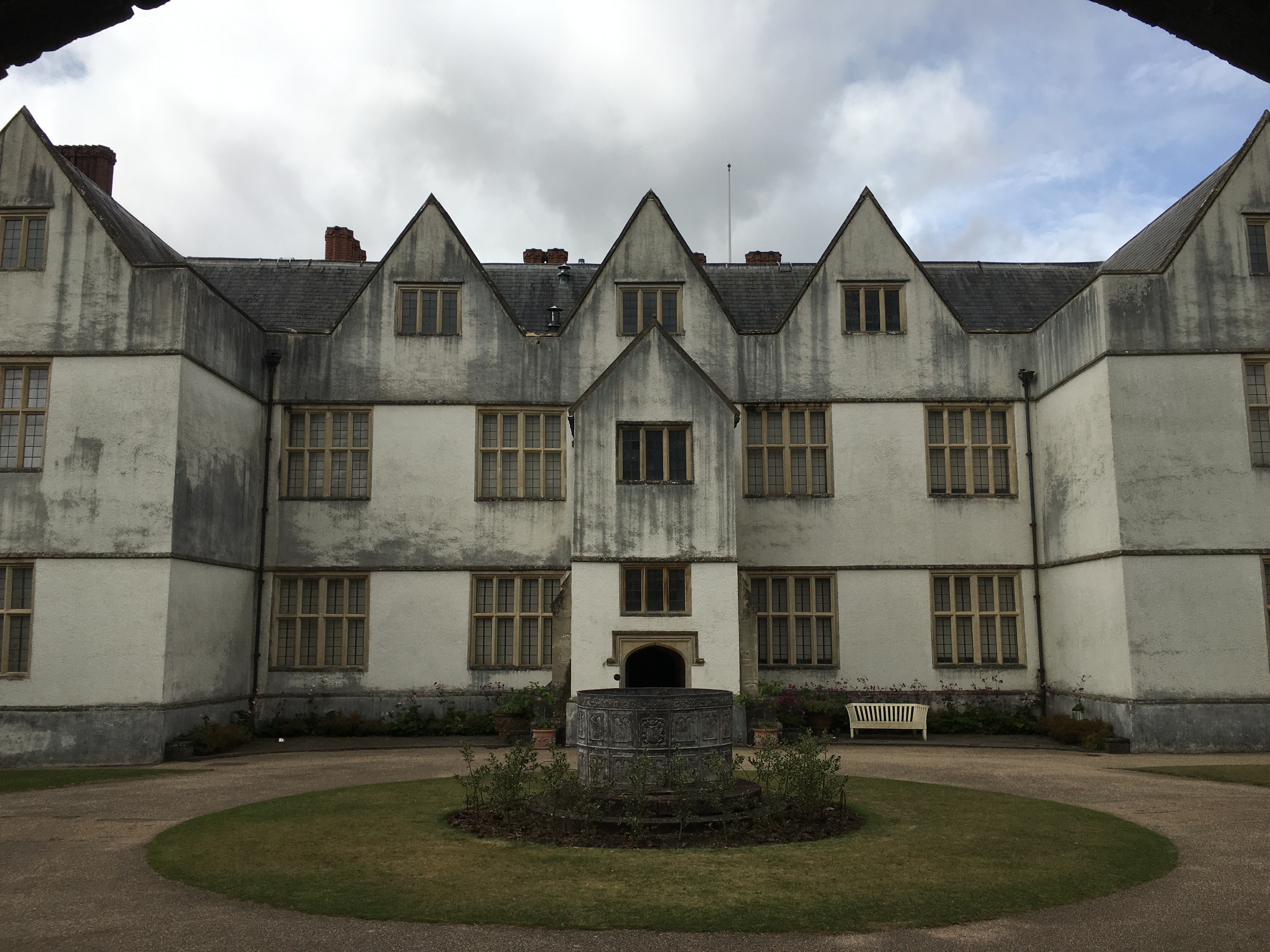
Main facade of the castle, courtyard and cistern in 2025

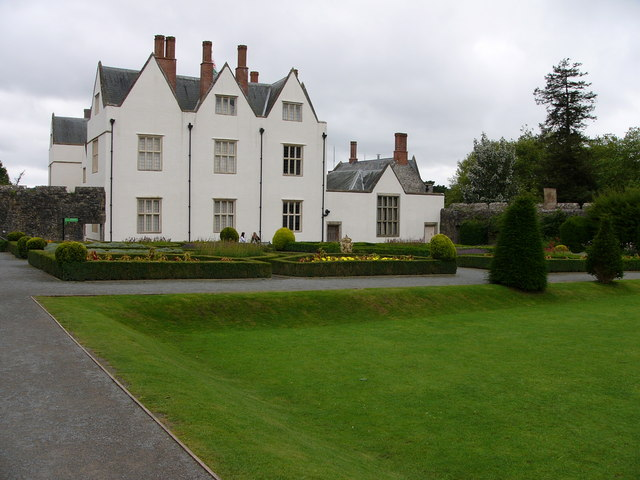
North facade and gardens

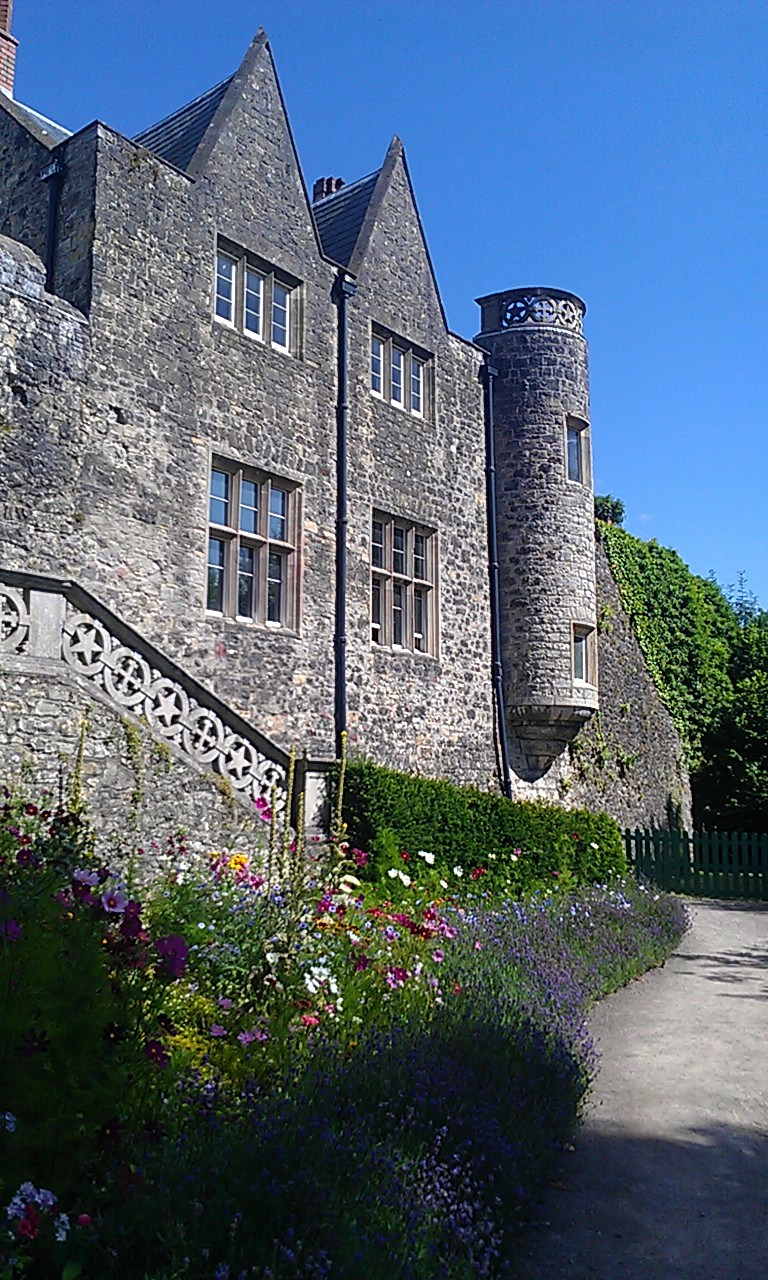
Western wall

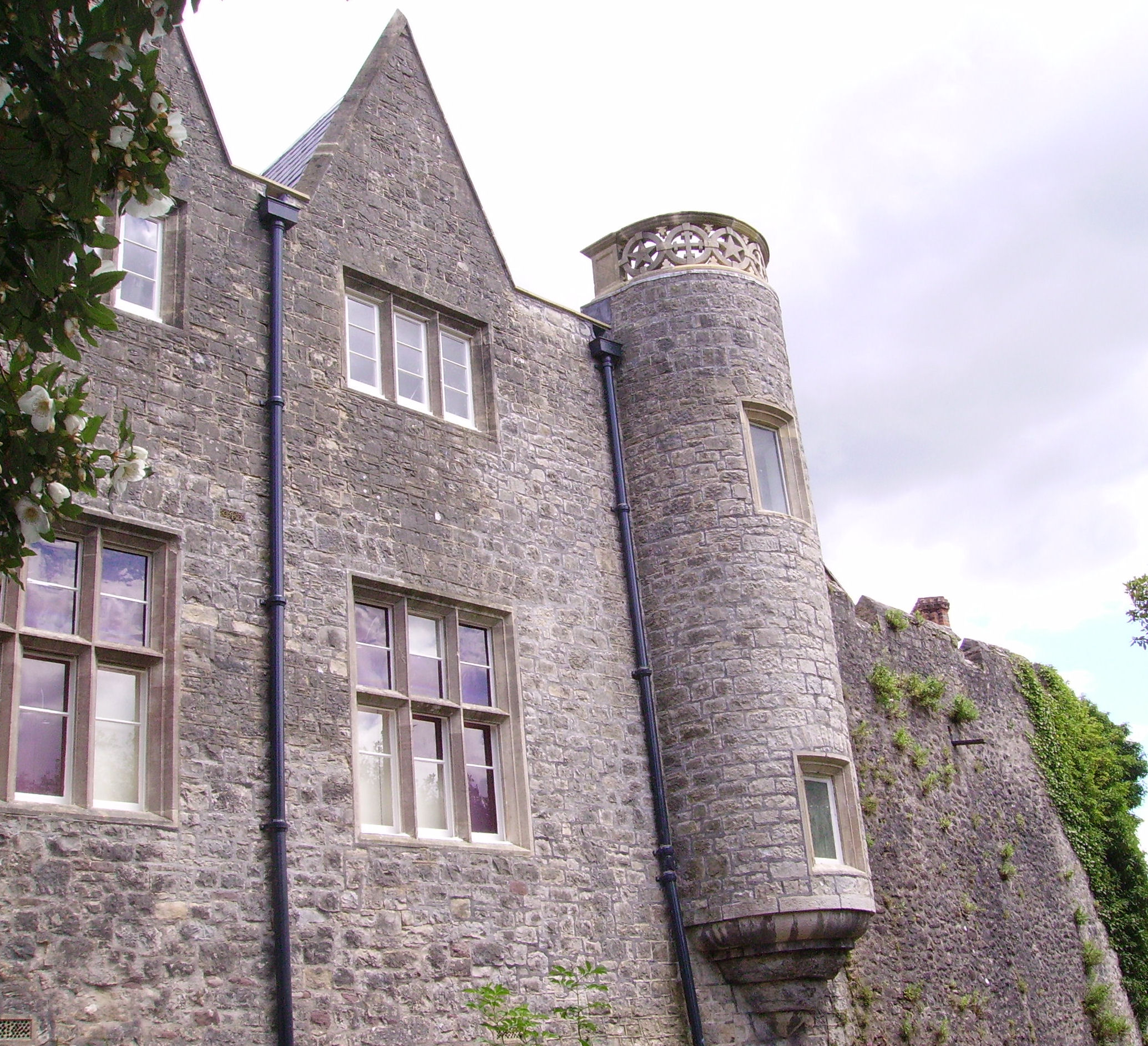
Part of west wall and old fortifications

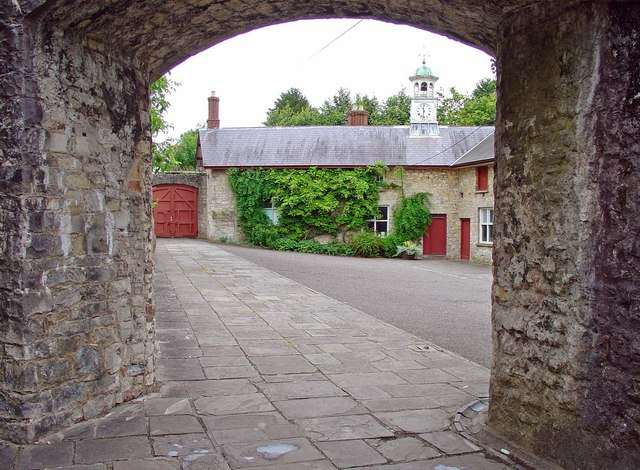
Stable block

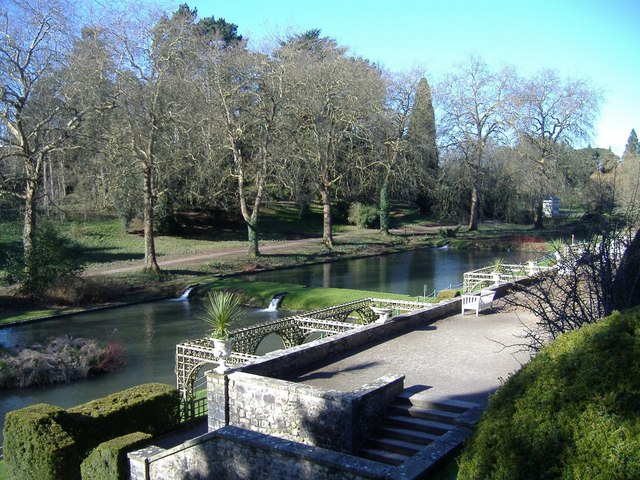
Gardens and medieval ponds

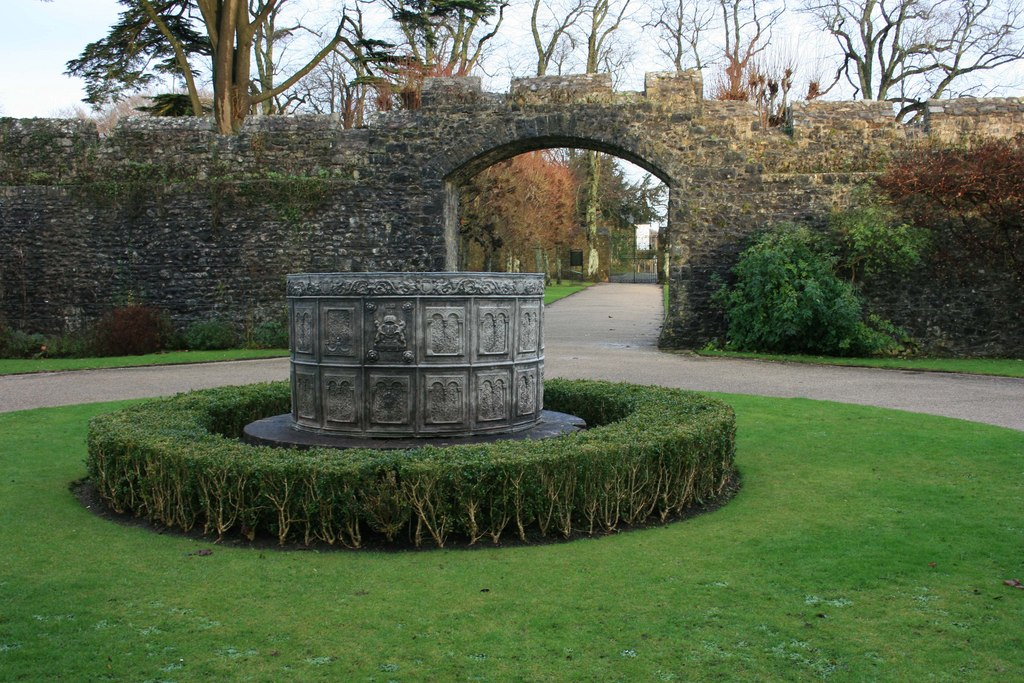
1620s Lewis of the Van lead cistern from Y Fan manor
