= Charles James Barnett =

English cricketer and politician (1796–1882)

Charles James Barnett (31 October 1796 – 31 December 1882) was an English amateur cricketer who played from 1820 to 1837 and a Whig politician who sat in the House of Commons from 1831 to 1835.

Barnett was born in Kensington, London the son of James Barnett, a banker and politician, and his wife Ann.

Mainly associated with Marylebone Cricket Club (MCC), Barnett made 29 known appearances in important matches. He represented the Gentlemen in the Gentlemen v Players series.

In 1825, Barnett became the first known president of MCC. This is an annual appointment and he was succeeded by Lord Frederick Beauclerk for 1826. There may have been earlier presidents but there is no record of them and it was on 28 July 1825 that the Lord's pavilion was burned down with the loss of all club records.

Barnett was elected Whig Member of Parliament (MP) for Maidstone in 1831 and held the seat until 1835.

Barnet was a J.P. and Deputy Lieutenant and in 1881 was living in Brighton. He died at Brighton at the age of 86.

Barnett married Sabine Louisa Curtis daughter of Sir William Curtis Bt at Marylebone on 29 June 1839. The first of their seven recorded children, William Barnett, was born at Tetworth Hall, in Potton, Bedfordshire, where the family was then living, late in 1841.

Parliament of the United Kingdom
Preceded by Henry Winchester; Abraham Wildey Robarts	Member of Parliament for Maidstone; 1831 – 1835; With: Abraham Wildey Robarts	Succeeded by Wyndham Lewis; Abraham Wildey Robarts
