= Abraham Wildey Robarts =

British politician and banker (1779–1858)

Member of Parliament for Maidstone
- In office 1818–1837 Serving with George Longman, John Wells, Henry Winchester, Charles James Barnett, Wyndham Lewis
- Preceded by: George Simson; Egerton Brydges
- Succeeded by: Benjamin Disraeli; Wyndham Lewis

Personal details
- Born: 1 August 1779
- Died: 2 April 1858 (aged 78)
- Party: Whig
- Spouse: Charlotte Anne Wilkinson (m. 1808; died 1858)
- Parent(s): Abraham Roberts; Sabine Tierney

Abraham Wildey Robarts (1 August 1779 – 2 April 1858), of Hill Street, Berkeley Square, Middlesex, was an English politician and banker.

== Early life ==
Robarts was born on 1 August 1779 into a well known political family. He was the eldest son of Abraham Roberts and his wife Sabine Tierney (sister of George Tierney). Among his brothers were George James Robarts, William Tierney Robarts, and James Thomas Robarts of the East India Company.

In early life he was a writer for the East India Company in Canton.

== Career ==
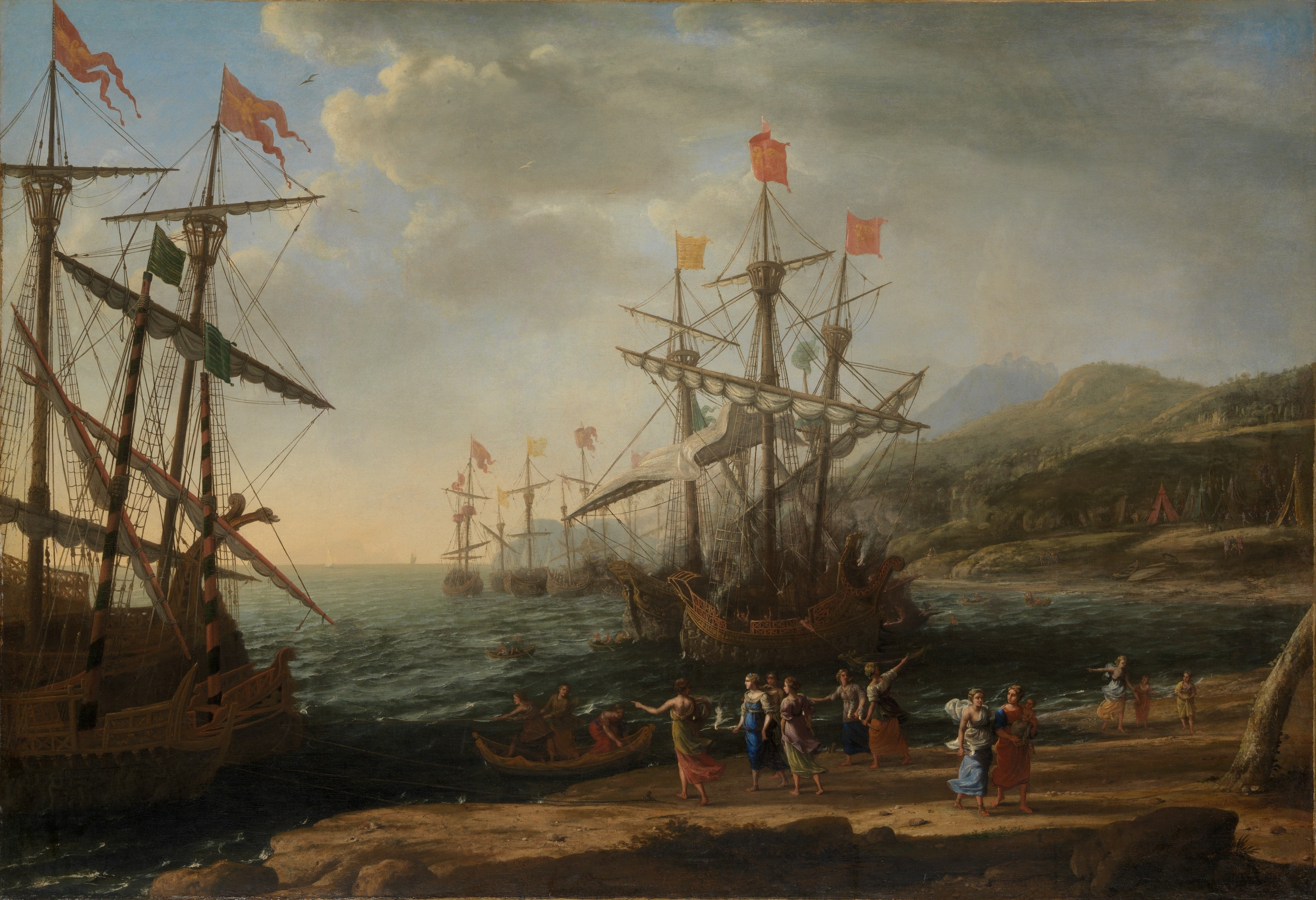
"The Trojan Women Set Fire to their Fleet" by Claude Lorrain, c. 1643

He became a director of the East India Company, also a partner in the bank Robarts & Curtis, and worked as a West Indies factor.

Robarts was a Member (MP) of the Parliament of the United Kingdom for Maidstone from 1818 to 1837. He was succeeded by Benjamin Disraeli, who later went on to become Prime Minister of the United Kingdom.

In 1825 he was a director of the New Zealand Company, a venture chaired by the wealthy John George Lambton, Whig MP (and later 1st Earl of Durham), that made the first attempt to colonise New Zealand.

=== Slave ownership ===
According to the Legacies of British Slave-Ownership at the University College London, Roberts was awarded a payment as a slave trader in the aftermath of the Slavery Abolition Act 1833 with the Slave Compensation Act 1837. The British Government took out a £15 million loan (worth £1.54 billion in 2025) with interest from Nathan Mayer Rothschild and Moses Montefiore which was subsequently paid off by the British taxpayers (ending in 2015). Robarts was associated with four different claims, he owned 566 slaves in Jamaica and Dominica and received a £11,023 payment at the time (worth £1.13 million in 2025).

== Personal life ==
On 20 January 1808, Robarts was married to Charlotte Anne Wilkinson (1788–1865), daughter of Edmund Wilkinson of Potterton Lodge, Tadcaster, Yorkshire. From 1827 to 1857 he resided at Parkstead House. Together, they were the parents of one son and several daughters, including:

- Abraham George Robarts (1810–1860), who married Elizabeth Sarah Smyth, a daughter of John Henry Smyth of Heath Hall, and the former Lady Elizabeth FitzRoy (a daughter of the 4th Duke of Grafton).

In 1823, Robarts acquired the c. 1643 painting, "The Trojan Women Set Fire to their Fleet" by Claude Lorrain, from Lord Radstock.

Robarts died on 2 April 1858.

=== Descendants ===
Through his son Abraham, he was a grandfather of Abraham John Robarts (1838–1926) of Robarts, Lubbock & Co., who married Hon. Edith Barrington (a daughter of the 8th Viscount Barrington); parents of John Robarts (married Margaret Cholmeley, daughter of Sir Hugh Cholmeley, 3rd Baronet), banker Gerald Robarts.

Parliament of the United Kingdom
Preceded by George Simson; Egerton Brydges	Member of Parliament for Maidstone; 1818 – 1837; With: George Longman (1818–1820); John Wells (1820–1830); Henry Winchester (1830–1831); Charles James Barnett (1831–1835); Wyndham Lewis (1835–1837)	Succeeded by Benjamin Disraeli; Wyndham Lewis
