= Lewis family of Van, Glamorganshire =

Welsh family

Lewis
- Royal House
- Arms of Lewis: Sable, a lion rampant argent Crest a lion sejant argent

- Flag of Gwynedd
- Parent family: House of Cunedda by way of the House of Gwynedd by way of the House of Aberffraw by way of the House of Dinefwr.
- Country: Wales
- Current region: United Kingdom
- Origin: Caerphilly, Glamorganshire, Wales
- Founded: 1500; 526 years ago (Note: The year the family settled in St Fagans. The first ruler from the family took the name Lewis in 1500.)
- Founder: Sir Edward Lewis
- Seat: St Fagans Castle
- Historic seat: Van, Caerphilly
- Titles: Titles held prior to the adoption of the name Lewis: King of the Britons; King of Powys; King of Gwynedd; King of Deheubarth; King of Dyfed; King of Seisyllwg; Prince of Wales; Prince of the Welsh; Prince of Gwynedd; Prince of Deheubarth; Prince of Seisyllwg; Baron Chandos; Lord of Cantref Mawr; Lord of Cemais; Lord of Ceredigion; Knight of the Garter
- Connected families: Barons Tredegar • Earl of Plymouth • House of Windsor Morgan Family • Fielding Lewis • Washington family • Aberffraw • Plantagenet • Tudor • Courtenay • Grey • Holland • Percy • FitzAlan • Tudors of Penmynydd • Herbert family • Earl of Pembroke • Earl of Carnarvon •
- Motto: 'Patriœ fidus' (Faithful to my country) and 'Ofner na ofno angau' (Let him be feared who fears not death)

The Lewis family, of Van in Glamorganshire is a Welsh royal house and the senior line of the Royal House of Gwynedd (Medieval Latin: Venedotia / Norwallia / Guenedota; Middle Welsh: Guynet). The progenitor of the family name is Sir Edward Lewis of the Van, born around 1508. Sir Edward served as the Sheriff of Glamorgan during the years 1548, 1555, and 1559, he is descended from the royal houses of Dinefwr and Gwynedd through his ancestor Ifor Bach. The Lewis family were strong allies and supporters of the Earls of Carnarvon and Pembroke.

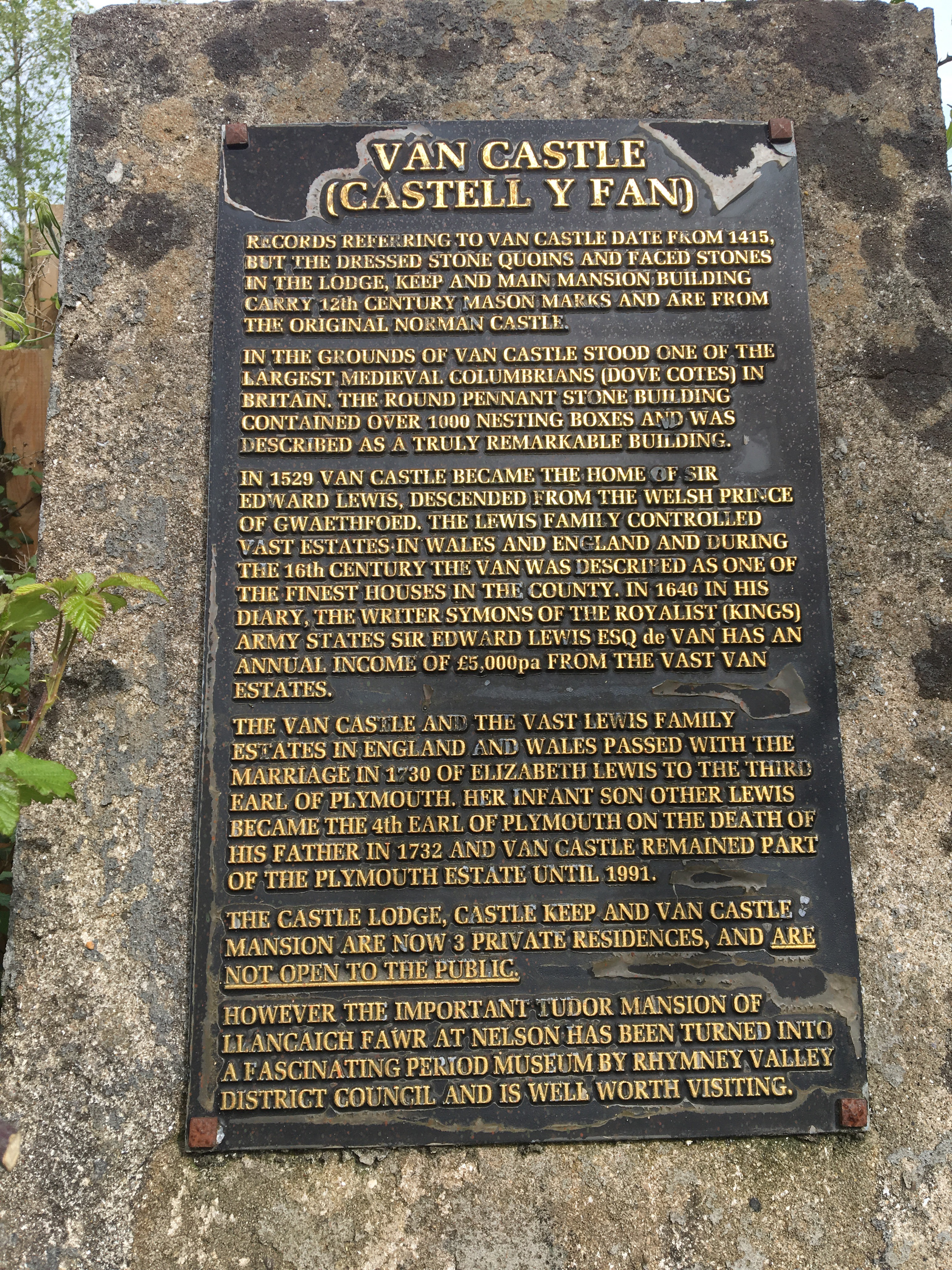
Lewis of the Van memorial stone

== Family seat ==
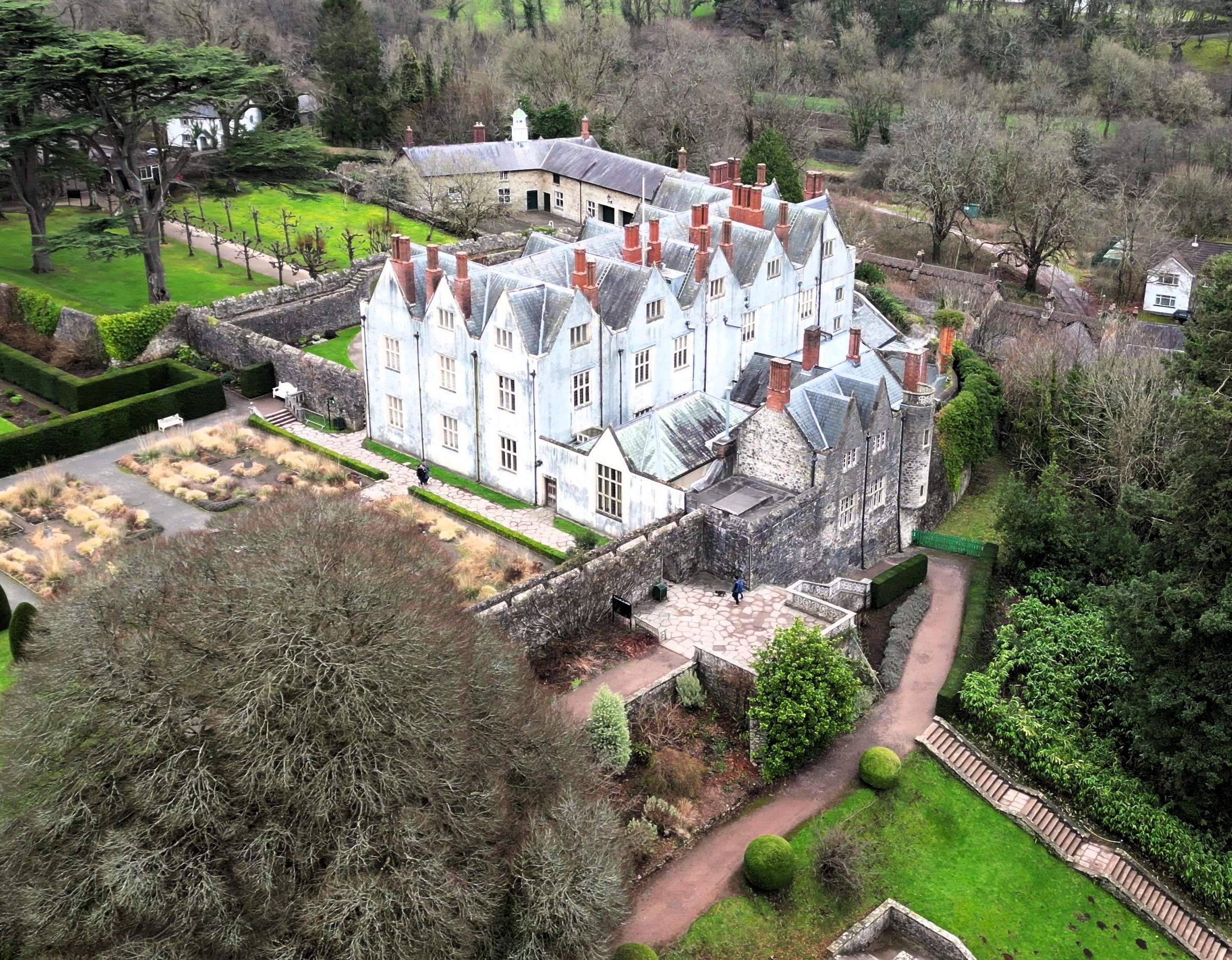
St Fagans the second Lewis family seat

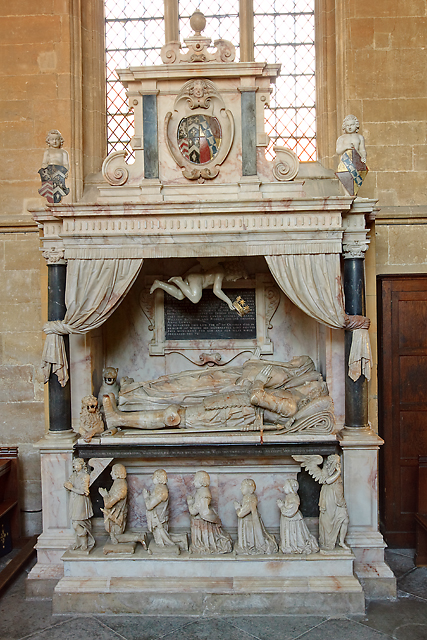
Tomb of Sir Edward Lewis

The original family seat was Y Van Castle. In the 1580s, permission was given to Thomas Lewis to use stone from nearby Caerphilly Castle to build a manor house. The resulting building was known as Van Castle, Castell y Fan, or simply 'The Van'. The building was seen as an innovation of its day but its construction led to the further dilapidation of the original castle in Caerphilly.

Sir Edward of The Van, Caerphilly, acquired the estate of St Fagans and surrounding lands including Radyr from the Herbert family under a deed that established an entail in tail male (Fee tail male), ensuring the estate would descend exclusively through the male line of the Lewis family forever (in perpetuity). The agreement stipulated that, should the male line of the Lewis family become extinct, the property would revert to the Herbert family as the reversionary heirs (Reversionary interest). By granting St Fagans to the Lewis family with a male entail and a right of reversion, they transferred ownership and structurally ensured the integrity of the Lewis family's rightful inheritance. By retaining a contingent reversion, the Herberts reinforced the legitimacy of the Lewis claim and positioned themselves as custodians of the estate’s intended lineage.

The castles interior dates partly from then and partly from after 1850, when it began use as the preferred summer home of the senior branch of the Windsor-Clive family The Plymouth estate through the marriage of Elizabeth Lewis to Other Windsor, 3rd Earl of Plymouth On 7 May 1730 absorbed vast amounts of the Lewis estates after the death of Elizabeth's father Thomas Lewis despite the estates being made in tail male

== Heraldry ==
The coat of arms of the Lewis family is a silver lion rampant argent.

The family has two family mottos, the first patriae fidus (Faithful to my country) and second Ofner na ofno angau (Let him be feared who fears not death).

The second family motto is of note, originating from on old legend from the reign of Edgar King of England. King Edgar requested the Welsh princes to row him on his royal barge across the river dee where he had summoned the Princes. One of the Princes Gwaithwood the ancestor of Ivor refused to respond with "Ofner na ofno augau "(Fear him who fears not death). The King was pleased with the response and held the Prince in high regard. The only other family to have borne this motto is the Bruce family of Scotland.

== Ancestry ==
The Lewis family of Van in Glamorgan, Wales, is descended from the royal House of Gwynedd, an ancient Welsh dynasty. This lineage connects them to some of Wales' most notable historical figures, such as Padarn Beisrudd, Cunedda ap Edern, Rhodri Mawr (Rhodri the Great), who ruled in the 9th century and unified much of Wales under his leadership and King Hywel the Great. Generations later, the family includes Ivor Bach, a powerful lord who famously defended Welsh rights against Norman encroachment by capturing Cardiff Castle in the 12th century. Through strategic marriages, the Lewis family maintained their standing, eventually connecting to other noble Welsh lineages. This royal heritage not only established the Lewises as prominent landowners in Glamorgan but also reinforced their influence in Welsh society and governance

across centuries. The Lewis family of Van also claims descent from the Roman Emperor Magnus Maximus, who ruled in the late 4th century AD and is known in Welsh tradition as Macsen Wledig. According to Welsh genealogical lore, Maximus married a Welsh princess named Elen, connecting his imperial lineage with the native nobility of Britain. This ancestral connection is a point of pride for many prominent Welsh families, including the Lewises of Glamorgan. He is given as the ancestor of a Welsh king on the Pillar of Eliseg, erected nearly 500 years after he left Britain, and he figures in lists of the Fifteen Tribes of Wales.

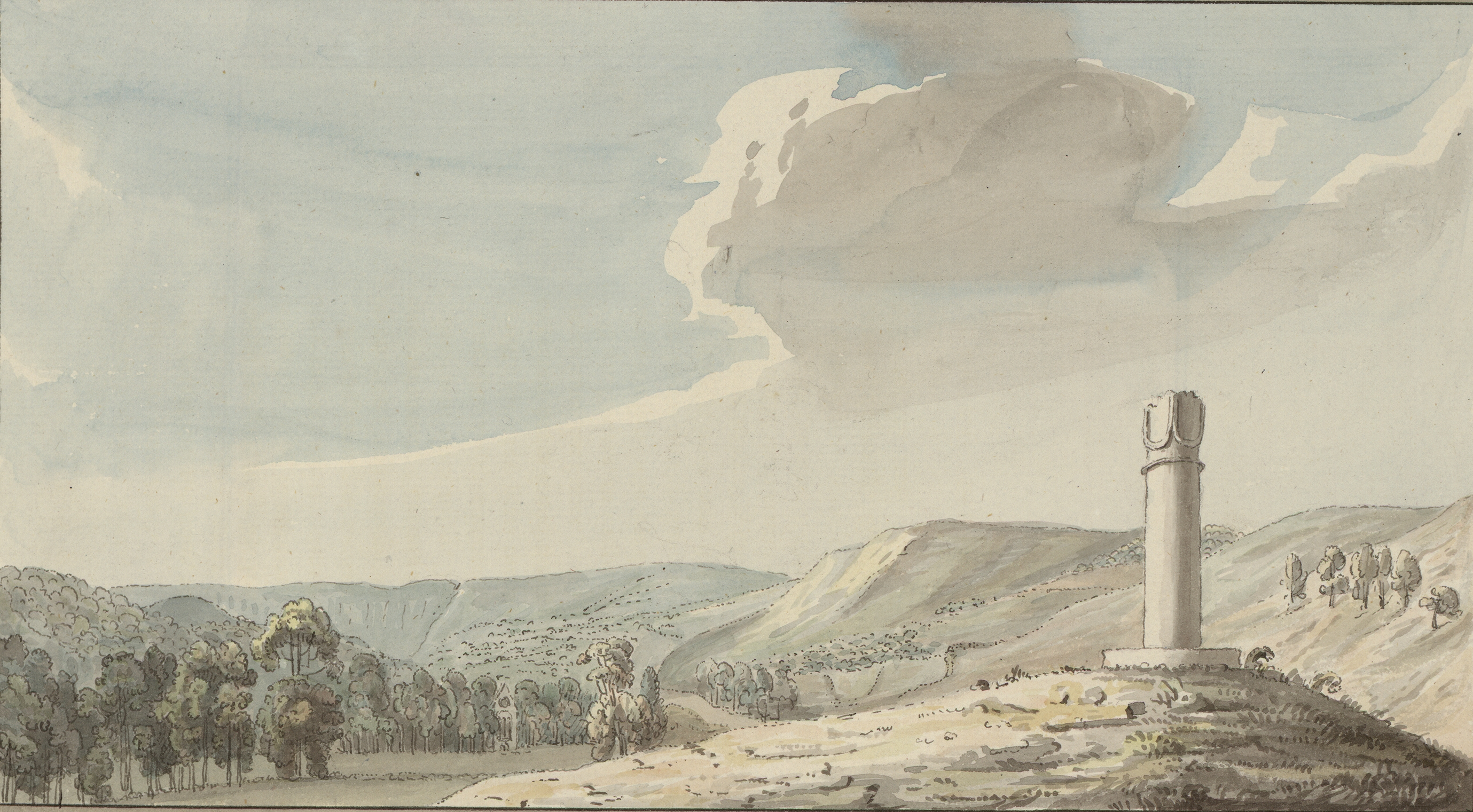
The Pillar of Eliseg in Wales. The pillar's inscription and the Historia Brittonum trace the sovereignty of contemporary Welsh kingdoms back more than 500 years to Maximus.

The family maintained this distinguished heritage through strategic marriages and land acquisitions, reinforcing their noble status and linking their lineage to one of the most storied emperors of Rome. This lineage not only solidified their standing within Wales but also connected them to broader European aristocratic networks.

The Lewis family of Van is also a descendant of William the Conqueror through a line connecting Ifor Bach, This link is established through the marriage of Ifor Bach's son, Griffith, to the daughter of William Fitz Robert, the 2nd Earl of Gloucester. The Earl of Gloucester was a significant Norman noble and the son of Robert, Earl of Gloucester, who himself was an illegitimate son of King Henry I, the son of William the Conqueror. This marriage brought together Welsh and Norman lines, embedding the Lewis family within the bloodline descending from the Conqueror.

== Politics ==
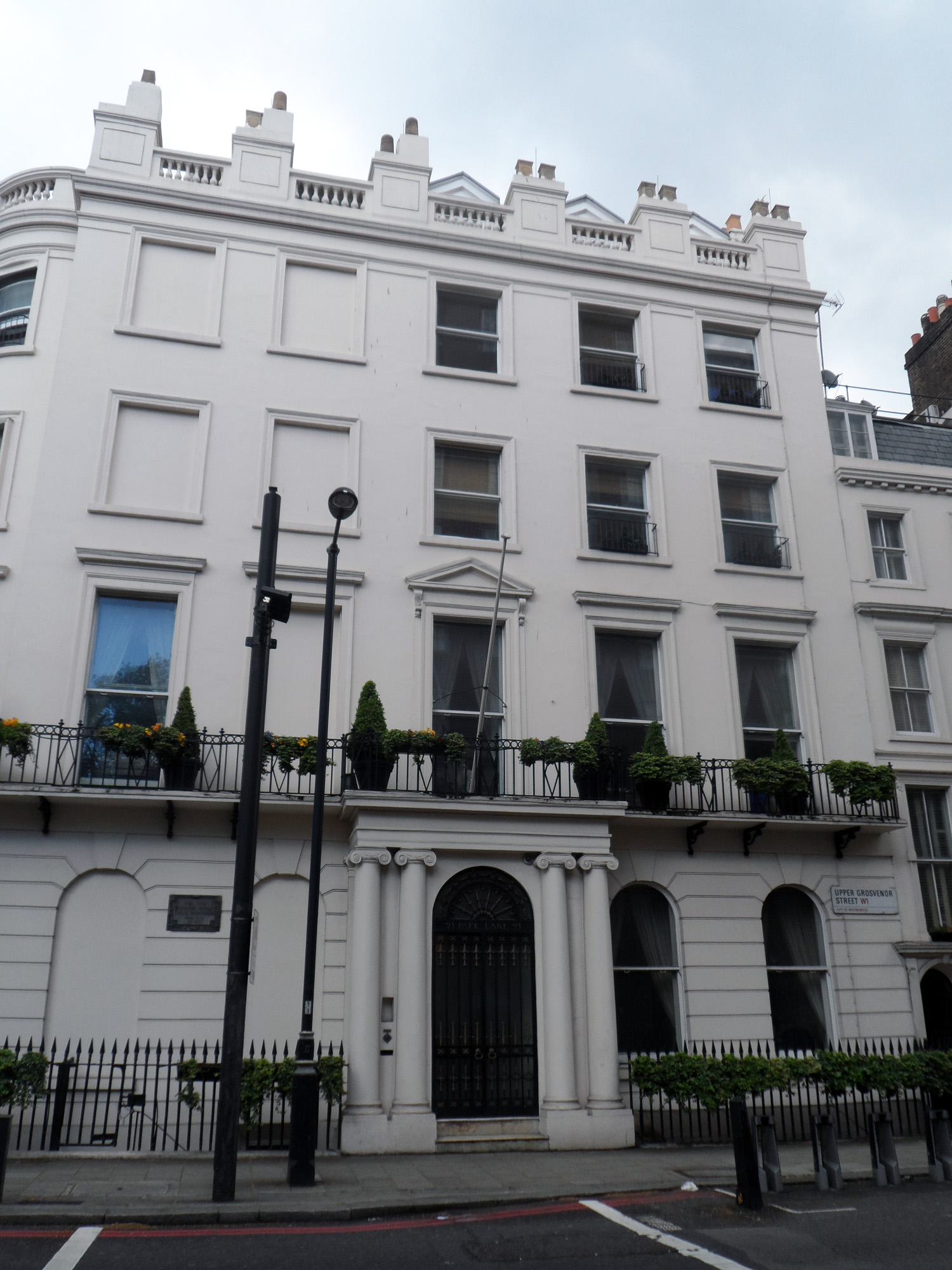
House of Wyndham Lewis

Wyndham Lewis, a member of the Lewis family of Van, played a significant role in supporting Benjamin Disraeli, who would become a prominent political figure and eventually Prime Minister of the United Kingdom. Lewis, a wealthy landowner and a member of Parliament, was married to Mary Anne Lewis, who later married Disraeli after Wyndham's death. This connection became pivotal as Mary Anne continued Wyndhams legacy and acted as a crucial supporter in Disraeli's political career. Wyndham Lewis's financial backing was instrumental during Disraeli's early parliamentary career, helping to alleviate some of the financial burdens Disraeli faced due to his debts and political aspirations. This support allowed Disraeli to focus on his political goals, and Mary Anne, continuing the legacy of her first husband, played an active role in Disraeli's career, managing his public image and engaging in political fundraising. The Lewis family, particularly through Wyndham, helped shape the political landscape of the UK by fostering relationships between key political figures and enabling significant financial support that allowed for Disraeli's ascent in the Conservative Party who at times has been referred to as the founding father of the modern Tory party. Their contributions were part of the larger fabric of political manoeuvring during a transformative period in British history.

== Industry ==
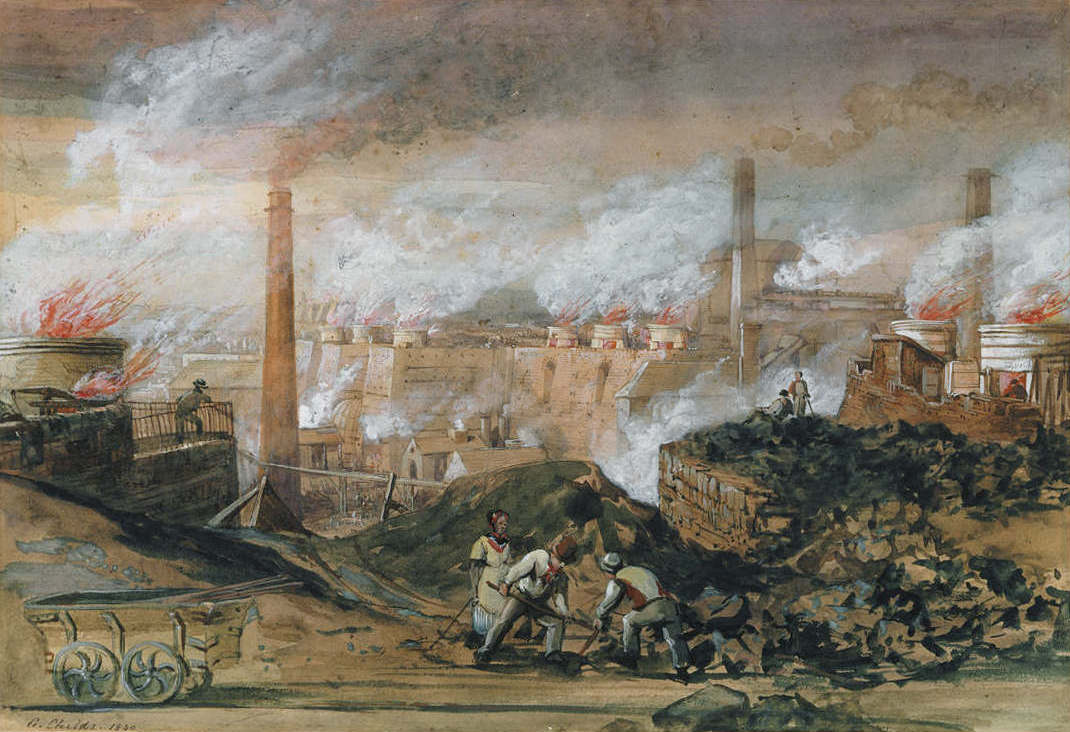
Dowlais Ironworks

The Lewis family played a significant role in the industrial development of Wales and Britain through their association with the Dowlais Ironworks, one of the largest and most influential iron production facilities in the 19th century. Founded in 1759 in Merthyr Tydfil, Wales, Dowlais Ironworks became a powerhouse of the Industrial Revolution, producing high-quality iron for railways, construction, and machinery. The ironworks expanded under the leadership of industrialists like Josiah John Guest, but the Lewis family, as influential landowners in Glamorgan, were instrumental in supporting and facilitating the industry in their region. Their estates provided both the land and resources necessary to fuel industrial growth and their investments in infrastructure helped secure South Wales as a center of British iron and coal production. The success of the Dowlais Ironworks not only contributed to Britain's industrial might but also helped transform the Welsh economy, fostering urbanization and laying the foundations for future advancements in engineering and manufacturing. The Lewis family's legacy in Welsh industry is still evident in the historic significance of Dowlais and the continued impact of industrialisation on the region's economic development.

== American colonialism ==
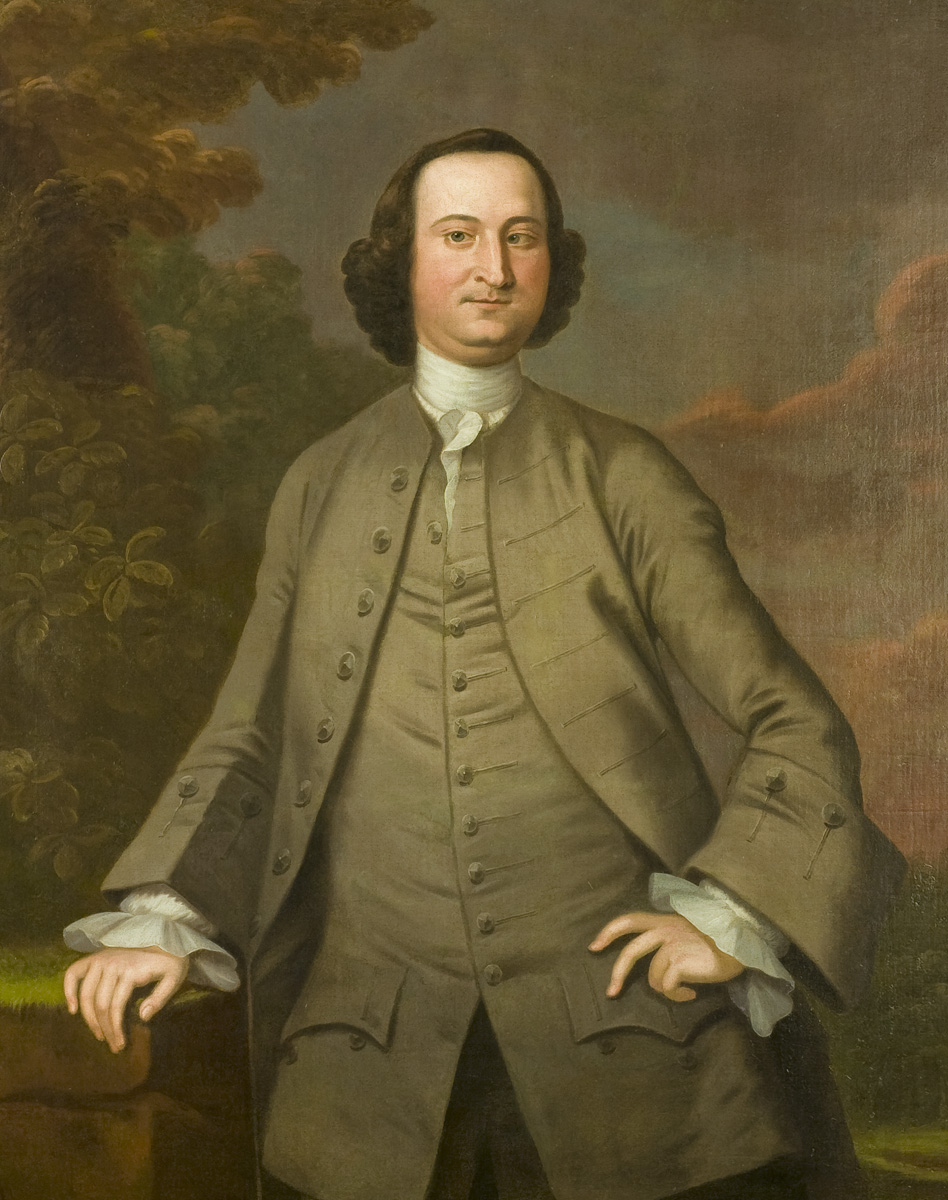
Fielding Lewis

The Lewis family's influence on the colonization of America is prominently highlighted through key family members who migrated to the American colonies in the 17th century. Notably, Robert Lewis, the fourth son of Sir Edward Lewis of the Van and Ann Sackville, sailed for Virginia in 1635. Upon his arrival, he was granted a substantial estate of 33,333 acres, establishing a prominent family lineage in the American colonies, especially in Virginia. This land grant and settlement laid the groundwork for generations of Lewises who became significant figures in Virginian and American history, with family members later participating in American colonial governance, landholding, and military leadership. This connection and expansion exemplified the Lewis family's early role in British colonial society, contributing to the settlement patterns, economy, and governance of early America. The family's influence is documented in multiple genealogical accounts and historical sources, showing how the legacy of the Lewis family of the Van bridged both British and American historical landscapes.

The Lewis family, through their American descendants, held significant connections to prominent colonial figures, including George Washington. Robert Lewis, son of Sir Edward Lewis of Brecon and a descendant of the Welsh Lewis family, emigrated to Virginia in the early 17th century. This branch of the Lewis family grew influential in the American colonies, with Fielding Lewis—a descendant of Robert—marrying Betty Washington, George Washington's sister. This union between the Lewises and the Washingtons created a close familial bond that would impact the early governance and military leadership within Virginia and the emerging United States. Lawrence Lewis, another member of the family and nephew of Washington, later married Nellie Custis, Washington's step-granddaughter, further intertwining the families.

=== Sources ===
- Dictionary of Landed Gentry Of Great Britain & Ireland By John Burke
- Glamorgan, being an outline of its Geography, History, and Antiquities by A. Morris
- The land of Morgan: being a contribution towards the history of the lordship of Glamorgan
- The general armory of England, Scotland, Ireland, and Wales; comprising a registry of armorial bearings from the earliest to the present time 1884
- The house of Morgan: an American banking dynasty and the rise of modern finance
- Lewis of Warner Hall: The History of a Family, Including the Genealogy of Descendants in Both the Male and Female Lines, Biographical Sketches of Its ... Descent from Other Early Virginia Families
