= Mary Anne Disraeli =

Wife of British Prime Minister

The Right Honourable The Viscountess Beaconsfield
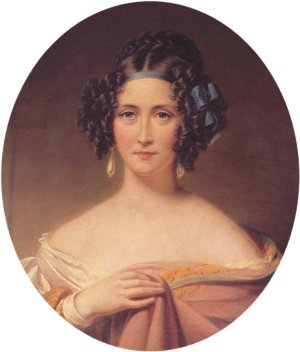
- Portrait by James Godsell Middleton, painted after her death, based on a miniature in Disraeli's possession
- Born: Mary Anne Evans; 11 November 1792
- Died: 15 December 1872 (aged 80)
- Known for: Spouse of the prime minister of the United Kingdom (1868)
- Spouses: Wyndham Lewis (m. 1815; died 1838) Benjamin Disraeli (m. 1839)

Mary Anne Disraeli, 1st Viscountess Beaconsfield (née Evans; 11 November 1792 – 15 December 1872) was a British peeress and society figure who was the wife of the British statesman Benjamin Disraeli.

== Biography ==
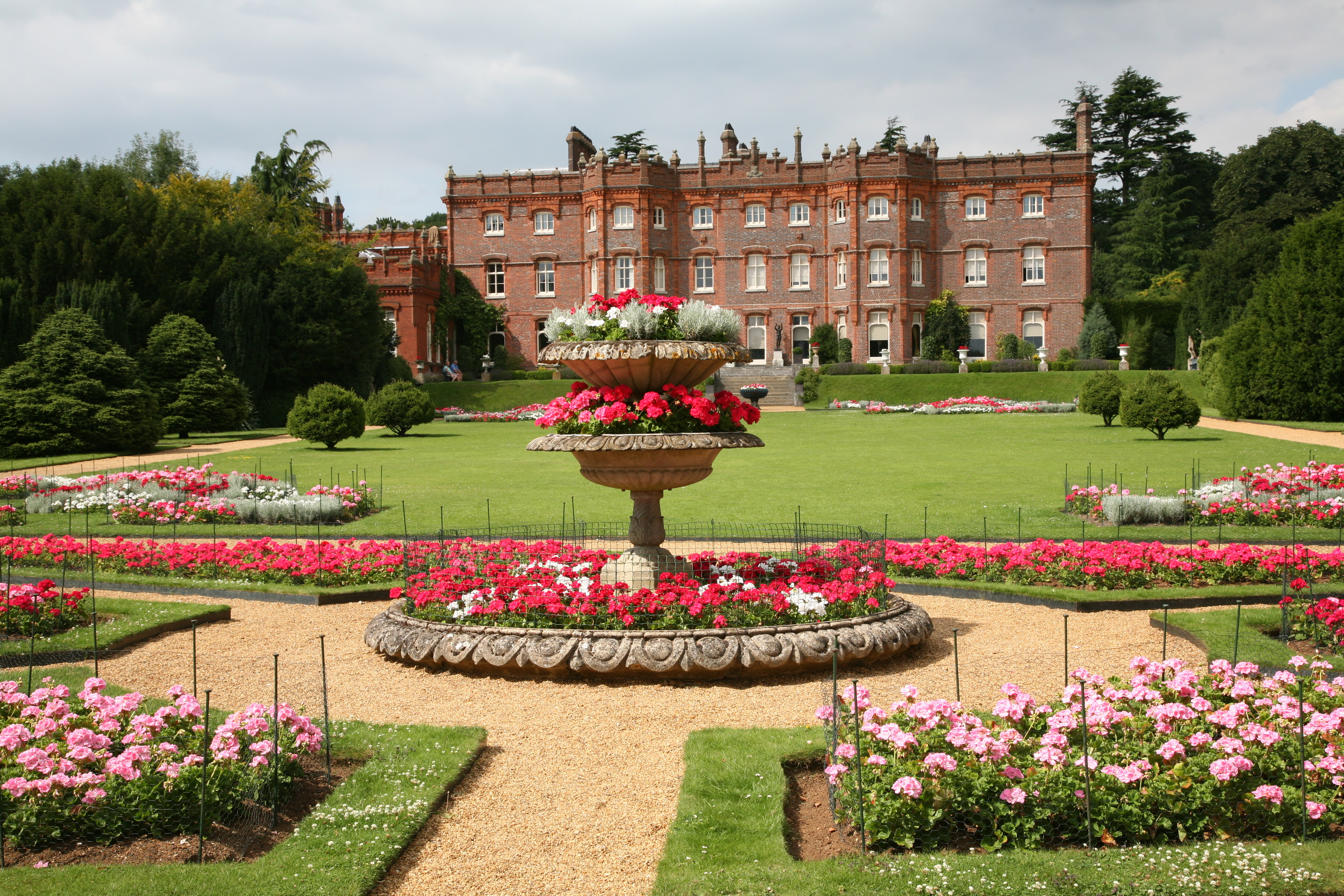
Hughenden, home to the Disraelis

Born in Brampford Speke, near Exeter in Devon, the only daughter of Commander John Evans and Eleanor Viney (later Mrs Eleanor Yate). In 1815 at Clifton, Bristol, Mary married Wyndham Lewis, MP (1780–1838), a colleague of Benjamin Disraeli. In August 1839, the year following Lewis's death, she married Disraeli at St George's, Hanover Square, in London. Her fortune allowed him to purchase the estate of Hughenden in Buckinghamshire and to live in the style of an English gentleman.

In recognition of Disraeli's services to the nation, Queen Victoria desired to ennoble him at the end of his first ministry. However, as he wished to remain in the House of Commons, his wife accepted the title in his place and was created Viscountess Beaconsfield, of Beaconsfield in the County of Buckingham, on 30 November 1868. (After Mary's death, Disraeli accepted the title of Earl of Beaconsfield.)

Staid Victorians were often scandalised by Mary's uninhibited conversation but soon learned not to insult her within Disraeli's hearing. Even Queen Victoria herself was said to be amused when Mary Anne commented, in response to a remark about some lady's pale complexion, "I wish you could see my Dizzy in his bath!" Once, at a house party where Lord Hardinge, a great soldier of the day, was in the room next to the Disraelis, Mary Anne announced at breakfast that she had slept the night before between the greatest soldier (Hardinge) and the greatest orator (Disraeli) of their times: Lady Hardinge was definitely not amused.

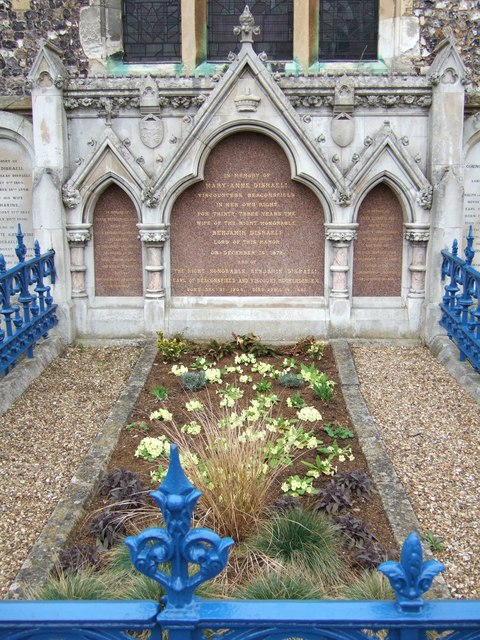
The Disraeli family tomb, Hughenden

Disraeli had been unimpressed by Mary Lewis when he first met her, but he came to understand that she was shrewder than her outward manner had led him to believe. She was a great help to him in editing the books he wrote, and spent 30 years taking care of him. She once joked in public that although he had married her for her money he would do it again for love. In later life she became increasingly eccentric, both in conversation and appearance, but her husband's devotion and loyalty to her never faltered. She was some twelve years older than her husband but their romance continued until the day she died.

In the spring of 1872, Mary became seriously ill, and by May it was clear that she was dying of stomach cancer. She rallied sufficiently to take a summer tour through the Home Counties with her husband. In November she felt well enough to hold a small dinner party for their close friends; but her condition deteriorated and she died on 15 December, at the age of eighty.

"There was no care which she could not mitigate, and no difficulty which she could not face. She was the most cheerful and courageous woman I ever knew" her husband wrote after her death. His great adversary William Gladstone, who had liked Mary, wrote him a letter of condolence. Disraeli, touched by this sympathy from a man who disliked him, replied that "Marriage is the greatest earthly happiness when founded on mutual sympathy."

She is buried with Disraeli in a vault in the Church of St Michael and All Angels Church, Hughenden, in Hughenden, Buckinghamshire, close to the Disraeli family home, Hughenden Manor. The house is now in the care of the National Trust, and has been preserved in the state when it was occupied by the Disraelis. It is open to the public as a visitor attraction.

== Cultural depictions ==
George Arliss became renowned for his portrayal of the man in the 1911 play, Disraeli (which Arliss commissioned), in its 1917 revival, and in the 1921 and 1929 film adaptations. In the latter three productions, Arliss' wife, Florence Arliss, appeared in the role of Mary.

In The Prime Minister, a 1941 British historical film starring John Gielgud as Disraeli, Mary was portrayed by Diana Wynyard.

In The Invincible Mr Disraeli, (1963) she was portrayed by Greer Garson. Trevor Howard acted the part of her husband.

In the four-part 1978 ATV miniseries Disraeli: Portrait of a Romantic, written by David Butler, she was portrayed by Mary Peach, opposite Ian McShane as Disraeli. The miniseries was presented in the U.S. on PBS's Masterpiece Theatre in 1980 and was nominated for the Emmy Award for Outstanding Limited Series.

Mary makes an appearance as a non-player character in the 2015 video game Assassin's Creed Syndicate, where she is voiced by Jill Frappier.

== Arms ==
Coat of arms of Mary Anne Disraeli
Coronet A coronet of a viscountess Escutcheon Argent bunch of grapes pendent leaved and slipped Proper between two flaunches Sable each charged with a boar's head erased of the field. Supporters Dexter an eagle Or sinister a lion Or each gorged with a collar Gules pendent therefrom a shield Gules charged with a tower Or. Motto Forti Nihil Difficile (Nothing is Difficult for the Strong)
