= Thornhill, Cardiff =

Community in Cardiff, Wales

Thornhill: Welsh: Draenen Pen-y-graig
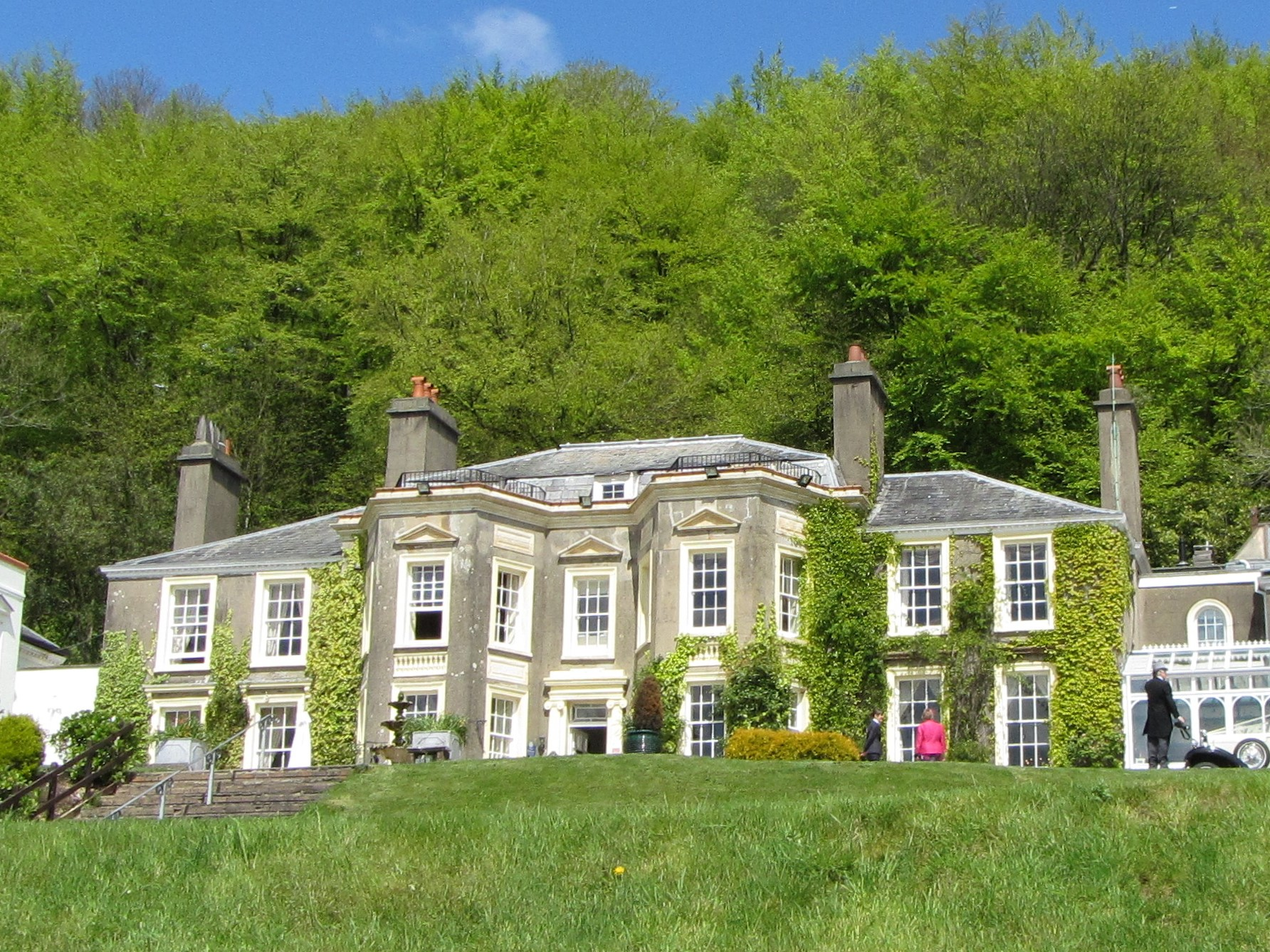
- New House Hotel, Thornhill

- Location within Cardiff
- Population: 6,300
- OS grid reference: ST17478283
- Principal area: Cardiff
- Preserved county: Cardiff
- Country: Wales
- Sovereign state: United Kingdom
- Post town: CARDIFF
- Postcode district: CF14
- Dialling code: +44-29
- Police: South Wales
- Fire: South Wales
- Ambulance: Welsh
- UK Parliament: Cardiff North
- Senedd Cymru – Welsh Parliament: Cardiff North
- List of places UK Wales Cardiff 51.5386°N 3.1911°W Map of the community

Thornhill (Welsh: Draenen Pen-y-graig; meaning draen thorn + -en one + pen top + 'y' the + craig rock [mutated to 'graig']) is a community in the north of the city of Cardiff, Wales. It lies south of Caerphilly.

== Description ==
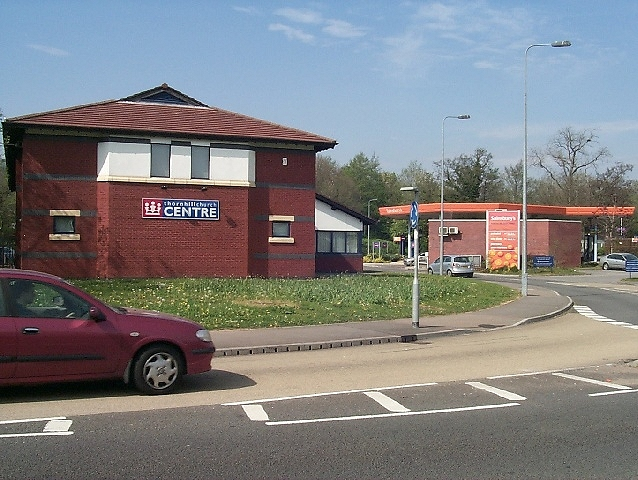
Thornhill Church Centre

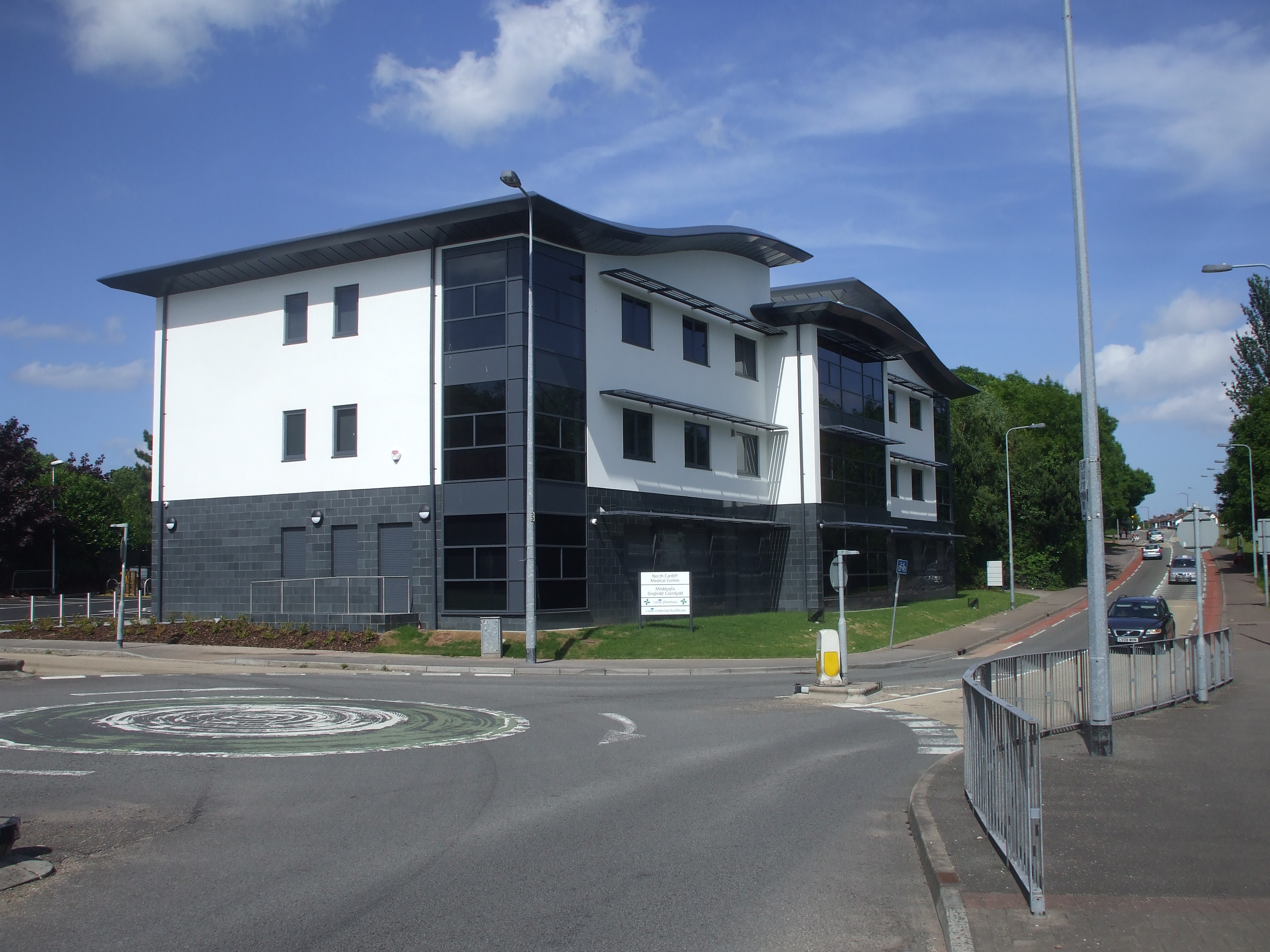
North Cardiff Medical Centre

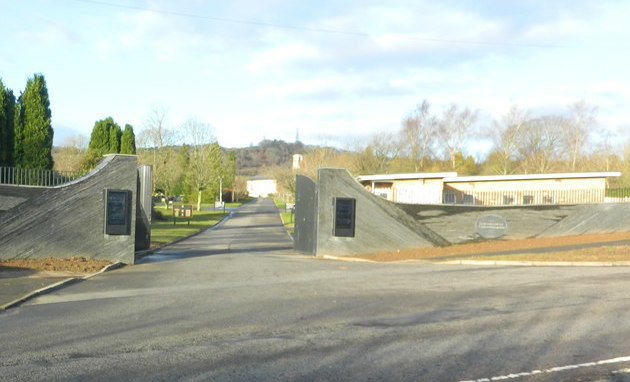
Thornhill Cemetery and Crematorium

It is a relatively modern area with housing stock dating mainly from the late 1980s and beyond. The area has a centralised precinct providing services, comprising a community centre (Thornhill Church Centre), a Sainsbury's supermarket, with an integral Post Office and Pharmacy; and the North Cardiff Medical Centre.

There are three public houses located in Thornhill: the Old Cottage, Pendragon, and the Ffynnon Wen. Though on Thornhill Road, The Traveller's Rest to the north is on Caerphilly Mountain and in Caerphilly based on its postcode and council locale.

Thornhill Cemetery is a major cemetery located adjacent to Thornhill, in Rhiwbina. Thornhill crematorium was built on this site during the 1950s as a dedicated crematorium. This differs from the crematorium that was set up in nearby Glyntaff; this in contrast was a chapel that was originally used for traditional burials and modified to serve as a crematorium.

Most of Thornhill's residential development took place during the 1990s. Cardiff Council originally planned Thornhill as "The Villages of Thornhill"; with clusters of houses interspersed by large "green" areas. These green areas were short lived as rapid housing development resulted in homes being built in areas adjoining the "Villages".

Thornhill also houses a few tucked away historical sites including the remains of a castle situated close to the Caerphilly/Thornhill border known as Castell Morgraig.

== Transport ==
Transport in Thornhill

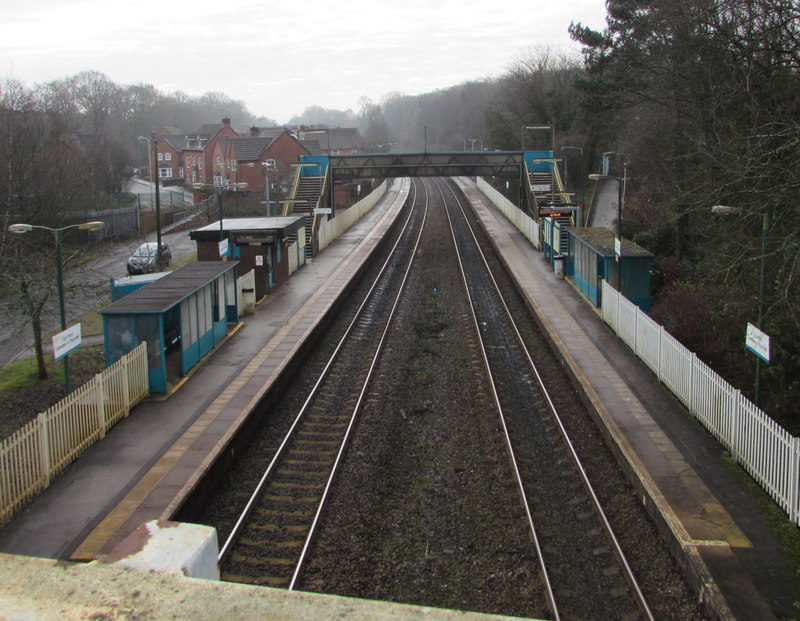
Lisvane and Thornhill railway station

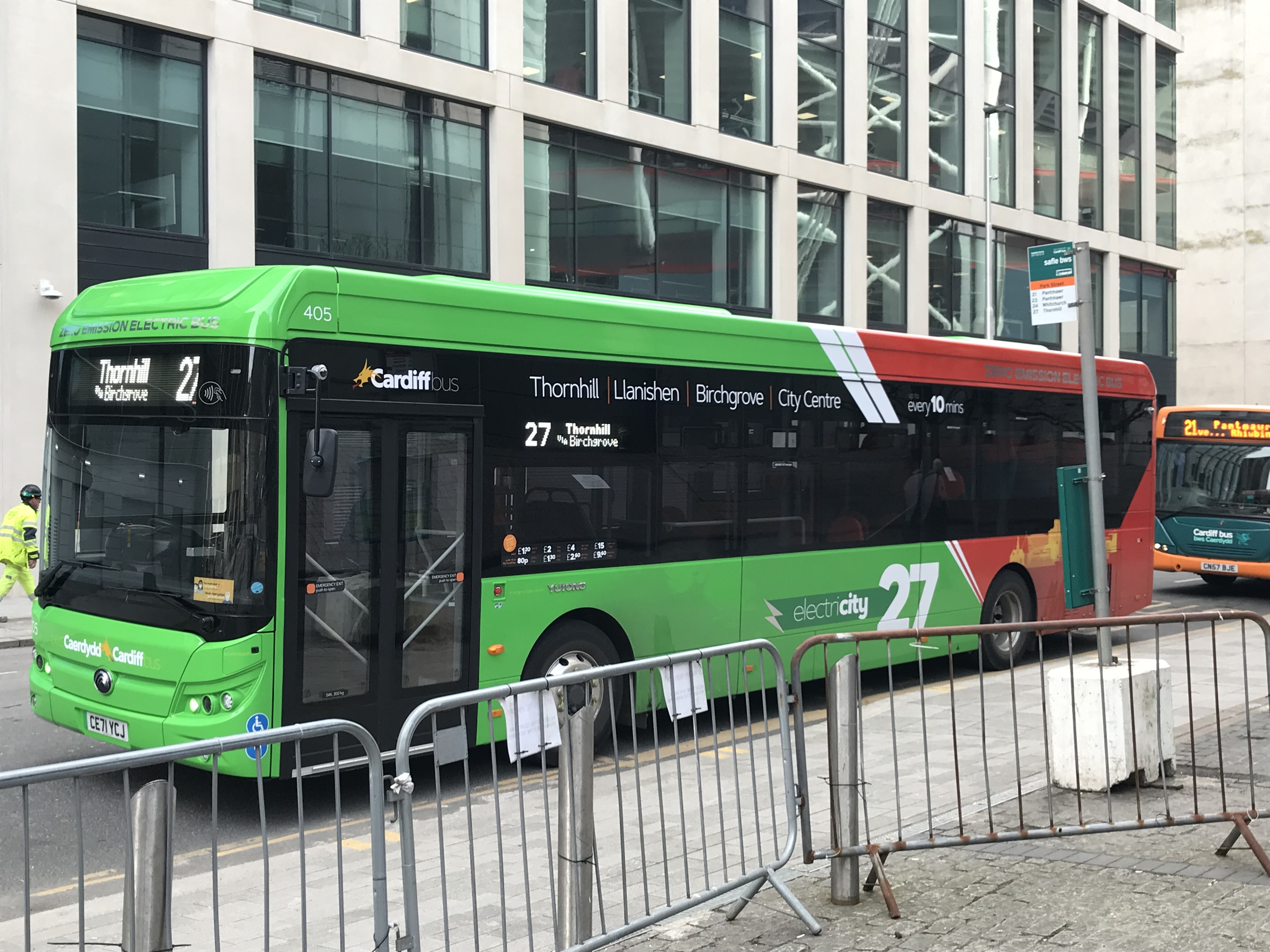
A Cardiff Bus service No 27 to Thornhill

Thornhill is served by Lisvane and Thornhill railway station which replaced Cefn Onn Halt railway station which closed in 1986.

Thornhill is served by bus services operated by Cardiff Bus. The 27 and 28 service runs through Thornhill and terminates at the Central Bus Station at regular intervals. Adventure Travel operates its C8 services, running from Taff's Well to Cardiff Bay, via Thornhill and Cardiff city centre. Stagecoach service 25 follows a route along Thornhill road on its way to the University Hospital of Wales and Cardiff City Centre. This service replaced the A and B services in 2017. Stagecoach Wales have operated the 86 service since 1 April 2019 after Cardiff Bus withdrew from the route. Cardiff Council tendered for a new operator for two years after designating the 86 service as one of several new 'socially necessary' routes in Cardiff.

The M4 motorway passes Thornhill between junctions 30 and 32 (but there is no Junction 31).

== Education ==
The area is served by Thornhill Primary School. The nearest secondary school is Llanishen High School. Welsh medium education is provided most locally at Ysgol Y Wern in nearby Llanishen and Ysgol Gyfun Gymraeg Glantaf in Llandaf North.

== Government ==
Thornhill falls into the Llanishen Ward on the City of Cardiff Council. In 2016 Thornhill became one of four new communities in Cardiff, having previously been part of the Llanishen community. There is no community council for the area.

== Notable people ==
- Axel Rudakubana, murder suspect in the 2024 Southport stabbings, born and raised in Thornhill.
