= Ifor Bach =

Welsh nobleman (born 1158)

Ifor Bach (meaning Ivor the Short) (fl. 1158) also known as Ifor ap Meurig and in anglicised form Ivor Bach, Lord of Senghenydd, was a twelfth-century resident in and a leader of the Welsh in south Wales.

== Welsh Lord of Senghenydd ==
At this period the Normans had conquered England, but large areas of Wales were still under the control of the native Welsh Princes and Lords. Whilst parts of the old Welsh Kingdom of Morgannwg (which was to become Glamorgan) had fallen to the Normans, Ifor ap Meurig held land in Senghenydd, a region of Morgannwg which had not yet fallen completely. Broadly Senghennydd was the upland area bounded by Brecknock to the north, between the River Taff and the Rhymney River and abutting Cefn Onn in the south.

The Norman Lord of the region was William Fitz Robert, 2nd Earl of Gloucester.

In 1158 he attacked and killed Morgan ab Owain, Welsh Lord of Caerleon and Gwynllwg (anglicised as Wentloog).

== Kidnapped the Earl of Gloucester ==
According to Giraldus Cambrensis in the Itinerarium Cambriae, in 1158 Ifor Bach was a tenant of William Fitz Robert, 2nd Earl of Gloucester, who held Cardiff Castle. Gloucester was trying to take land which under Welsh law belonged to Ifor.

Ifor scaled the walls of Cardiff Castle using his bare hands, seized the Earl, his Countess Hawise, a daughter of the Earl of Leicester, and their young son Robert, and kidnapped all of them to the woods of Senghenydd. He refused to release them until he had recovered the land he had lost "and a lot more".

== Descendants ==
Ifor ap Meurig was son of Meurig Fychan Cydifor (Father) and Gwyladys Verch Ithel (Mother).

He married Nest, sister of Rhys ap Gruffudd (also known as The Lord Rhys).

Descendants of Ifor ap Meurig continued to hold sway in the area and to harry the Normans for at least another century. He was succeeded by his son Gruffudd before 1170. Gruffudd ap Ifor married Mabel FitzRobert, a natural daughter of Robert, Earl of Gloucester, and half sister of the kidnapped earl. Ifor's descendants included his grandson Morgan Gam and his great-grandson Llywelyn Bren and, through Gruffudd and Mabel, Franklin Pierce. The Lewis of the (Van) family are known direct descendants of Ifor Bach.

Ifor ap Meurig is reputed to have built a medieval castle on the site now occupied by Castell Coch.

== Modern times ==
Clwb Ifor Bach, a nightclub in Cardiff's castle quarter is named after him, as is Ysgol Ifor Bach, a Welsh medium primary school in Senghennydd, Caerphilly.
