= Sir Edward Lewis =

Welsh landowner and sheriff

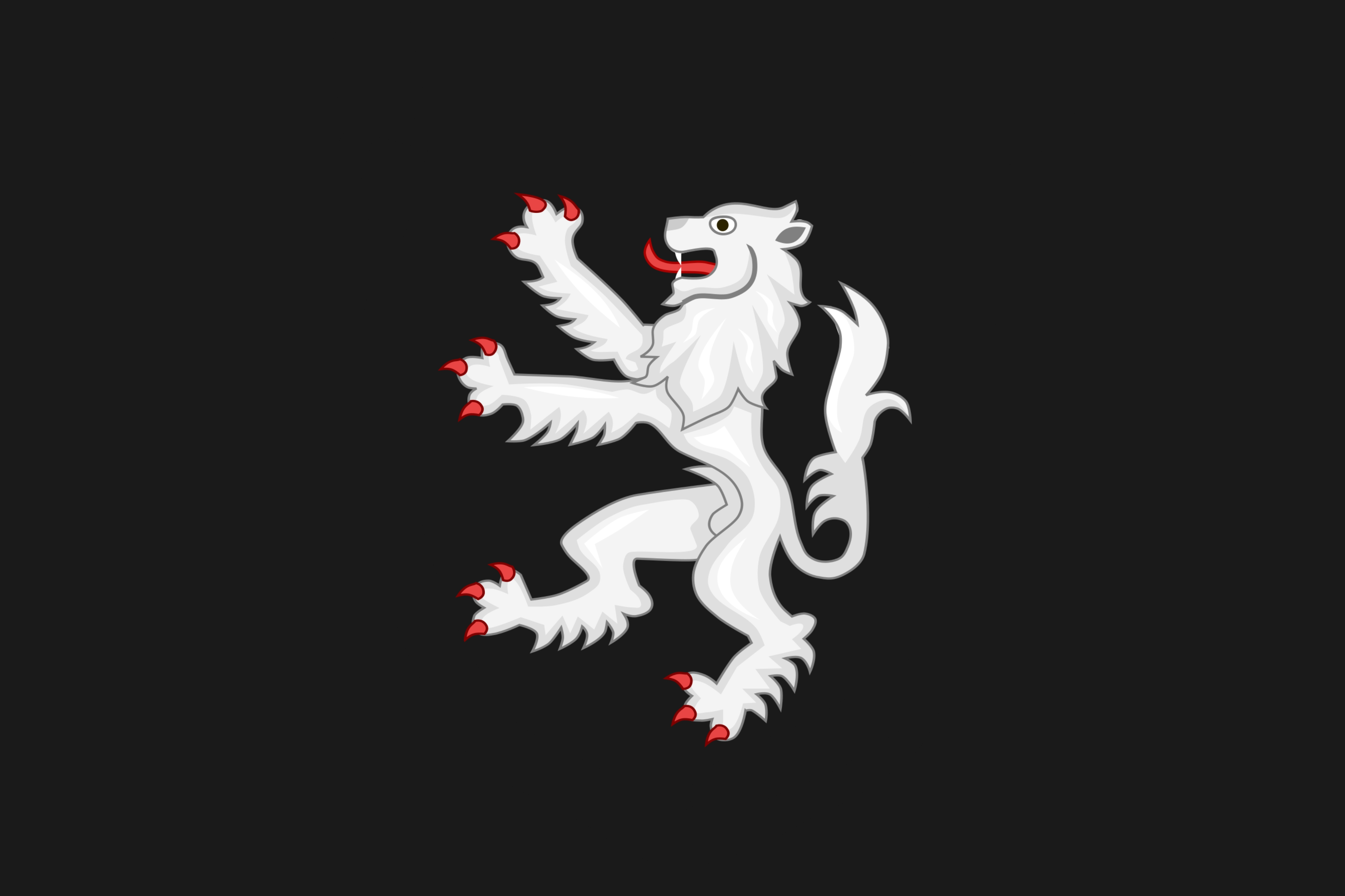
- Lewis Coat of Arms
- Place of origin: Wales
- Titles: sheriff

Sir Edward Lewis (Of the Van), Sheriff of Glamorgan (1508–1561) was a Welsh landowner and sheriff of Glamorgan who built Van Manor, served as Sheriff of Glamorgan multiple times in the mid-16th century.

== Biography ==
Sir Edward Lewis was a prominent Welsh landowner and the first to adopt the surname Lewis. He constructed the older sections of Van Manor, located near Caerphilly in Glamorganshire, Wales, and established the estate's park. Additionally, he acquired the manor of Roath-Keynsham, part of the former estate of Keynsham Abbey, enhancing his family's holdings.

Lewis served as Sheriff of Glamorgan on three occasions—in 1548, 1555, and 1559—demonstrating his prominent role in local governance and his influence within Welsh society. He was married to Ann Morgan, the daughter of Sir William Morgan of Pencoyd, Monmouthshire, a member of the notable Tredegar family. Their marriage linked the Lewis family to the Morgans of Tredegar.
