= Wyndham Lewis (politician) =

British politician

- Born: 7 October 1780
- Died: 14 March 1838 (aged 57)
- Spouse: Mary Anne Evans (m. 1815)

Wyndham Lewis (7 October 1780 – 14 March 1838) was a British politician and a close associate of Benjamin Disraeli, whom his widow married after his death.

== Biography ==
Lewis was the son of Reverend Wyndham Lewis, of Tongwynlais, Glamorganshire. From his family Lewis of Van, he inherited shares in the Dowlais Iron Company and substantial estates in Glamorgan, Monmouthshire and Gloucestershire. He entered Lincoln's Inn as a student in 1812, and was called to the bar in 1819. He was also a major in the county militia, a justice of the peace, and a deputy lieutenant.

He sat as Member of Parliament for Cardiff Boroughs from 1820 to 1826, for Aldeburgh from 1827 to 1829 and for Maidstone from 1835 to 1838.

Lewis married Mary Anne, daughter of John Evans, in 1816. They had no children. He died in March 1838, in London's Mayfair, aged 57. His widow married Benjamin Disraeli in 1839 and was created Viscountess Beaconsfield in 1868.

Mary Anne Lewis and Wyndham Lewis are mentioned in the book penned by the former politician, Douglas Hurd, about the needy "D'Israeli", on page 79. A quote from that book, tells us;

"It was at this moment that Mary Anne Lewis entered the scene. D'israeli had met Mary Anne five years previously, when he described her as a 'rattle and flirt'. At the Bulwers', Disraeli had been asked to take her down to dinner, he responded: "Oh anything rather than that insufferable woman, but Allah is Great." Five years on she seemed less insufferable to D'Israeli when he stood for Maidstone alongside her husband, Wyndham Lewis. Mrs Lewis already had a friendly eye for D'Israeli and during the contest the couple loaned him money for his election expenses. Both men were elected, but Wyndham died suddenly several months later. From that moment on, the connection between Mary Anne and D'Israeli grew in intensity...

== Notes ==
Parliament of the United Kingdom
Preceded by Lord Patrick Crichton-Stuart	Member of Parliament for Cardiff Boroughs; 1820–1826	Succeeded by Lord Patrick Crichton-Stuart
Preceded by Joshua Walker; John Wilson Croker	Member of Parliament for Aldeburgh; 1827–1829; With: Joshua Walker	Succeeded by Joshua Walker; Marquess of Douro
Preceded by Abraham Wildey Robarts; Charles James Barnett	Member of Parliament for Maidstone; 1835–1838; With: Abraham Wildey Robarts 1835–1837; Benjamin Disraeli 1837–1838	Succeeded by Benjamin Disraeli; John Minet Fector
