= Dowlais Ironworks =

Ironworks and steelworks near Merthyr Tydfil, Wales

Coordinates: 51.7604°N 3.3499°W

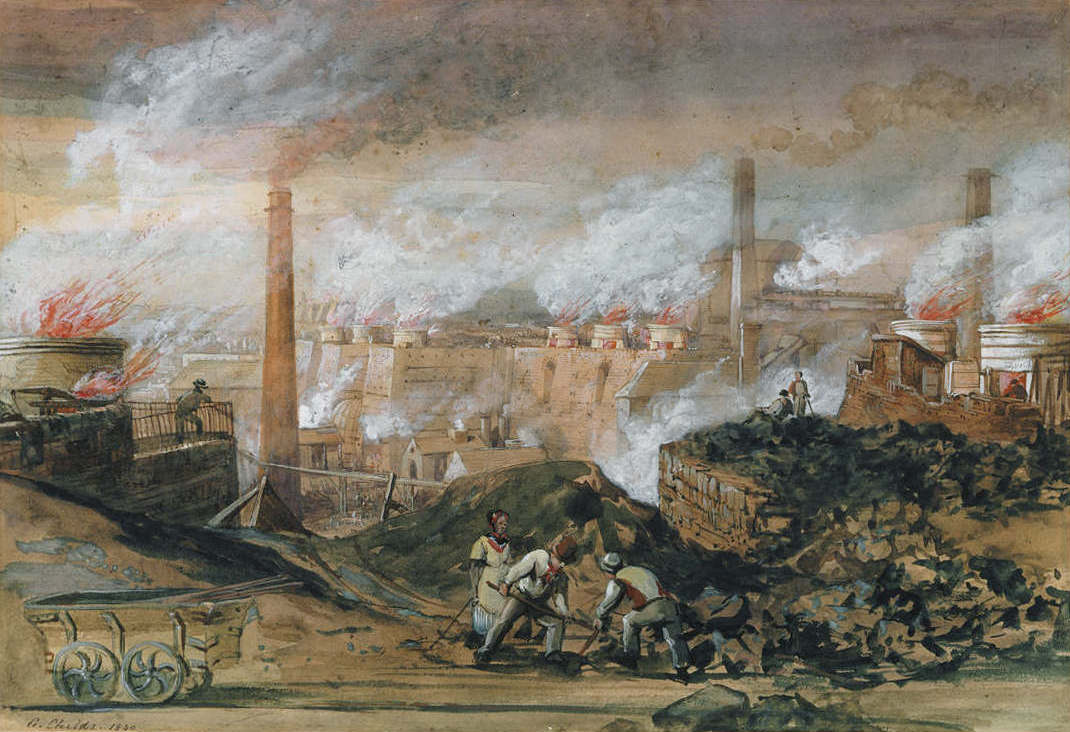
Dowlais Ironworks by George Childs (1840)

The Dowlais Ironworks was a major ironworks and steelworks located at Dowlais near Merthyr Tydfil, in South East Wales. Founded in the 18th century, it operated until the end of the 20th, at one time in the 19th century being the largest steel producer in the UK. Dowlais Ironworks was the first business to license the Bessemer process, using it to produce steel in 1865. Dowlais Ironworks was one of the four principal ironworks in Merthyr. The other three were Cyfarthfa, Plymouth, and Penydarren Ironworks. In 1936 Dowlais played a part in the events leading to the abdication crisis of Edward VIII, when the King visited the steelworks and was reported as saying that "these works brought these men here. Something must be done to get them back to work", a statement which was seen as political interference. The steelworks closed in 1987.

== Beginnings (1759–1807) ==
The works was founded on 19 September 1759 as a partnership of nine partners with a capital of £4,000. The partners were: Thomas Lewis, Thomas Price, Richard Jenkins, Thomas Harris, John Curtis, Nathaniel Webb, John Jones, Isaac Wilkinson and Edward Blakeway. The purpose of the partnership was the:

'... art misterry, and business of an iron master and iron manufacturer, and for that purpose to build a certain ffurnace or ffurnaces for smelting of iron ore or mine or stone into pig iron in the parish of Merthyr Tidvil for a term of 99 years, and that with the joint stock of £4,000 which the said partners hav agreed to bring in, advance and deliver in and before the first day of January AD 1760.'

Lewis brought to the partnership a complex system of leases that allowed the erection of a furnace and the right to mine iron ore, coal and limestone at Dowlais, Pantyrwayn and Tor-y-Fan. Wilkinson brought in his patented machine for blowing furnaces and his experience of having acquired the iron-works at Bersham, near Wrexham six years previously. The other partners brought in capital and various other leases and mineral rights.

The furnace was established on the hillside above Merthyr. It was not an ideal location. But all the elements for production were at hand. However, the enterprise struggled because its management was too thinly spread among the partners. In 1765, Nathaniel Webb, Thomas Price and William Lewis had become or were appointed executive partners. However, either because they 'could no longer give the expanding business their full attention, or because they felt that the enterprise needed the direction of an expert hand, on 30 April 1767 they offered John Guest the post of works manager.'

In 1781, Guest purchased 7 of the 16 shares in the works and a second furnace was built. In 1786, he was succeeded by his son, Thomas Guest, who formed the Dowlais Iron Company with his son-in-law William Taitt. Guest introduced many innovations and the works prospered.

== The era of John Josiah Guest (1807–1852) ==
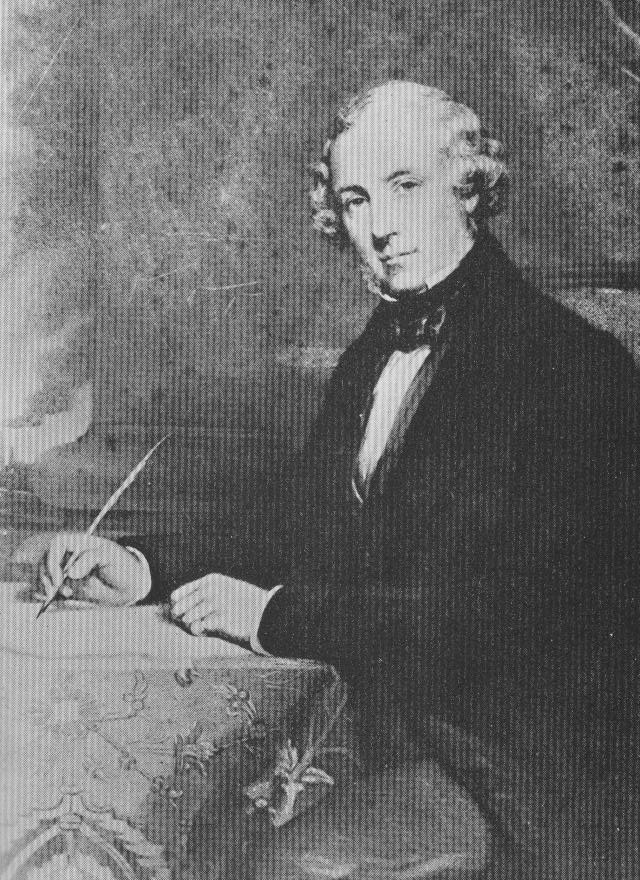
Sir Josiah John Guest

Thomas Guest died in 1807 and his son John Josiah Guest became sole manager, by 1815 owning nine of the sixteen shares. His brother Thomas Revel Guest owned one and Whyndham Lewis, the remaining six. Guest established the works in the vanguard of the Industrial Revolution and the application of science to industry, the works being honoured by a visit from Michael Faraday in 1819. Under Guest's leadership, alongside his manager John Evans, the Dowlais Ironworks gained the reputation of being "one of the World's great industrial concerns".

In 1821, the works supplied iron for the railway tracks of the Stockton and Darlington Railway, the world's first passenger railway. Over the next three decades, iron was needed in ever greater quantities to build the rapidly expanding railways. Dowlais had many foreign orders for railways in 1835–1836 such as the Berlin and Leipzig Railway and the St. Petersburg-Pauloffsky Railway.

Sometime during 1835, Guest made the acquaintance of engineer G. T. Clark. Both had been involved in the Taff Vale Railway. In 1850, Clark married Ann Price Lewis (died 1885), a descendant of Thomas Lewis. Ann's brother had sold her family's last remaining interests in the firm that year, to Guest.

At its peak in 1845, the works operated 18 blast furnaces, employed 7,300 people and produced 88,400 tons of iron each year.

== Reconstruction—Clark and Menelaus (1852–1899) ==
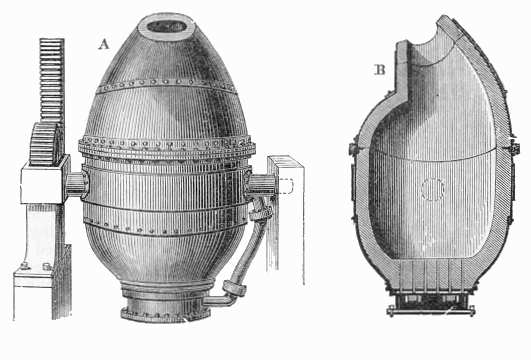
Bessemer converter

John Josiah Guest died in 1852, having become sole owner in 1851, and was buried at St. John's church in Dowlais. Guest named Clark, his widow Lady Charlotte Guest and Edward Divett as executors and trustees. Lady Guest would be sole trustee while a widow but she remarried in 1855 and de facto control fell to Clark. Henry Bruce, later to become Lord Aberdare, replaced Divett.

The works had been, for a while, in some decline and Clark took rapid steps to improve management controls, bringing in William Menelaus as general manager. The pair worked closely together and Dowlais again became a centre of innovation. Though the Bessemer process was licensed in 1856, nine years of detailed planning and project management were needed before the first steel was produced. The company thrived with its new cost-effective production methods, forming alliances with the Consett Iron Company and Krupp. By 1857 Clark and Menelaus had constructed the "Goat Mill", the world's most powerful rolling mill.

In 1863, the Company had recovered from a business slump but had no cash to invest for a new blast furnace, despite having made a profit. To explain why there were no funds to invest, the manager made a new financial statement that was called a comparison balance sheet, which showed that the company was holding too much inventory. This new financial statement was the genesis of the cash flow statement that is used today.

By the mid-1860s, Clark's reforms had born fruit in renewed profitability. Clark delegated day-to-day management to Menelaus, his trusteeship terminating in 1864 when ownership passed to Sir Ivor Guest. However, Clark continued to direct policy, in particular, building a new plant at the docks at Cardiff and vetoing a joint-stock company. He formally retired in 1897.

== The era of GKN (1899–1973) ==
Sir Ivor was distracted by other interests and, in 1899, sold the works to Arthur Keen who formed Guest, Keen & Co. Ltd. In 1902, Keen purchased Nettlefolds Limited to create Guest, Keen and Nettlefolds.

In 1912, King George V of the United Kingdom and Queen Mary made an official visit to the ironworks as part of a tour of south Wales. They entered through a specially-constructed arch of coal, and left through an arch of steel. During their shared visit, two of the GK&N Class D locomotive's numbered 40 and 42 respectively were on display. Before leaving both engines would be named after the king and queen

Unlike the Cyfarthfa Ironworks, the Dowlais Works' early conversion to steel production allowed it to survive into the 1930s. However, largely as a result of the Great Depression, the main works ceased production in 1936, the company having built a new iron and steel works at East Moors, adjacent to the docks at Cardiff in the late 19th century.

=== Visit by King Edward VIII ===
On 18 November 1936 Dowlais Ironworks was visited by King Edward VIII, which at the time was closed, putting thousands out of work. The King was reported as saying that "these works brought these men here. Something must be done to get them back to work", a statement which was seen as political interference, and contributed to the Edward VIII abdication crisis.

The iron foundry and engineering works in Dowlais, still known locally as the "Ifor Works" after John Josiah's son, continued to operate and new facilities were built after 1945.

== British Steel—managing the decline (1973–1987) ==
It continued for some years under the name of the Dowlais Foundry and Engineering Company, but was transferred to the nationalised British Steel Corporation in 1973, along with £20 million in cash (equivalent to £153 million in 2003) in return for the previously nationalised Brymbo Steelworks. It closed in 1987.

== Bibliography ==
- Edwards, J. R.; Baber, C. (1979). "Dowlais Iron Company: accounting policies and procedures for profit measurement and reporting purposes". Accounting and Business Research. 9 (34): 139–151. doi:10.1080/00014788.1979.9729149.
- Elsas, M. (1960). Iron in the Making. Dowlais Iron Company Letters 1782–1860. Glamorgan: County Records Committee.
- James, B. Ll. (2004) "Clark, George Thomas (1809–1898)", Oxford Dictionary of National Biography, Oxford University Press, accessed 21 August 2007 (subscription, Wikipedia Library access or UK public library membership required)
- Jones, E. (1987). A History of GKN, 1: Innovation and Enterprise, 1759–1918. Basingstoke: MacMillan. ISBN 0-333-34594-0.
- Lewis, M. J. (1983) "G. T. Clark and the Dowlais Iron Company: an entrepreneurial study", MSc Econ diss., U. Wales
- Owen, J. A. (1977). The History of the Dowlais Iron Works, 1759–1970. Newport: Starling Press. ISBN 0-903434-27-X.
- Rees, J.F. (1965). Studies in Welsh History (Second ed.). Cardiff: University of Wales Press.
- Vaughan, C. Maxwell (1975). Pioneers of Welsh Steel: Dowlais to Llanwern. Newport: Starling Press. ISBN 0-903434-08-3.
- Williams, J. (2004) "Menelaus, William (1818–1882)", Oxford Dictionary of National Biography, Oxford University Press, accessed 3 September 2007 (subscription, Wikipedia Library access or UK public library membership required)
