= Culpeper (surname) =

Culpeper, Colepeper, or Culpepper is a surname, first written "de Colepeper" in the 12th century in Kent, England. Notable people with the surname include:

- Culpeper baronets, including:
  - Sir Thomas Culpeper, 3rd Baronet (1656–1723), English politician
- Barons Colepeper, including:
  - John Colepeper, 1st Baron Colepeper (died 1660), English politician, Chancellor of the Exchequer 1643–1646
  - Thomas Colepeper, 2nd Baron Colepeper (1635–1689), English colonial governor of Virginia
- Alan Culpepper (born 1972), American distance runner, married to Shayne Culpepper
- Allen Culpepper Sealy (1850–1927), English artist
- Brad Culpepper (born 1969), American football player
- Carmen Ana Culpeper (born 1945), Puerto Rican businesswoman, Secretary of the Puerto Rico Department of the Treasury
- Cheney Culpeper (1601–1663), English landowner
- C. J. Culpepper (born 2001), American baseball player
- Cynthia Culpeper (1962–2005), American rabbi
- Daunte Culpepper (born 1977), American football player
- Ed Culpepper (1934–2021), American football player
- Edmund Culpeper (1660–1738), English scientific instrument maker
- Elizabeth Brooke (writer) (née Colepeper) (1601–1683), English religious writer and matriarch
- Frances Culpeper Berkeley (née Culpeper) (1634–1690s), American politician in Virginia and wife of three colonial governors
- Hanelle Culpepper, American filmmaker
- Jasper Culpeper (by 1508 – 1556/1564), MP for East Grinstead
- James Culpepper, drummer for American rock band Flyleaf
- Joel Culpepper (born 1984), English R&B singer-songwriter
- John Culpepper (disambiguation), also Culpeper and Colepeper, several people
- Joyce Culpeper (c.1480–c.1528), mother of Catherine Howard, the fifth wife and Queen consort of King Henry VIII
- Kaelen Culpepper (born 2002), American baseball player
- Knox Culpepper, American football player
- Martin Culpepper (c. 1540–1605), English clergyman, medical doctor and academic
- Marvin T. Culpepper (1908–1970), member of the Louisiana House of Representatives
- Nicholas Culpeper (1616–1654), English botanist, herbalist, physician, and astrologer
- Pat Culpepper (John Patrick Culpepper Jr, born 1941), American football player and coach
- Pepper D. Culpepper (born 1968), American political scientist
- Randy Culpepper (born 1989), American basketball player
- Raymond Culpepper, American evangelist, former General Overseer of the Church of God
- Shayne Culpepper (born 1973), American middle-distance athlete
- Thomas Culpeper (disambiguation), also Culpepper and Colepeper, several people
- William Culpepper (disambiguation), several people

== Fictional characters ==
- Duncan "Dunc" Culpepper, in the Culpepper Adventures series of novels by Gary Paulsen
- Frank Culpepper, in the 1972 film The Culpepper Cattle Co.
- Isabel Culpeper, in the books The Wolves of Mercy Falls
- T. G. Culpepper, in the 1963 film It's a Mad, Mad, Mad, Mad World
- Thomas Colpeper, in the 1943 film A Canterbury Tale
