= Culpeper (disambiguation) =

Culpeper is a town in the American state of Virginia.

Culpeper or Culpepper may also refer to:

== People ==
- Culpeper (surname), including a list of people with the surname Culpeper, Culpepper or Colepeper
- Culpeper baronets, two extinct titles in the Baronetage of England

== Places ==
- Culpeper Basin, New Jersey, United States
- Culpeper County, Virginia, United States, the county containing Culpeper
- Culpepper Island, a small uninhabited isle off the coast of Barbados, West Indies
- Darwin Island, formerly Culpepper Island, Galápagos Islands in Ecuador

== Other uses ==
- Culpepper (horse), an American Thoroughbred racehorse, winner of the 1874 Preakness Stakes

== See also ==
- Culpeper's Rebellion, 1677
