= John Finch (died 1740) =

English lawyer and Tory politician

The Honourable John Finch (c. 1689 – 1 January 1740), of Wornedale in Borden, Kent, was an English lawyer and Tory politician who sat in the House of Commons from 1722 to 1740.

Finch was the second son of Heneage Finch, 1st Earl of Aylesford, and his wife Elizabeth Banks, daughter of Sir John Banks, 1st Baronet. He was probably educated at Westminster School and matriculated at Christ Church, Oxford on 1 April 1709, aged 19. He was admitted at Inner Temple in 1710 and was called to the bar in 1719. On the death of his father, his brother Heneage Finch, 2nd Earl of Aylesford alienated the manor of Wornedale to him in 1721, after an act was passed that year for the purpose. Finch married Elizabeth Savile, daughter and heiress of John Savile, of Methley-hall, Yorkshire on 30 April 1726.

Finch was elected as Tory Member of Parliament for Maidstone on the family interest at the 1722 British general election. He voted consistently with the Opposition. His cousin, another John Finch, stood at Maidstone in a by-election on 1 June 1723 but was unsuccessful. At the 1727 British general election Finch was elected again for Maidstone in a contest. He is recorded as pairing with his cousin, Lord Perceval, on Walpole's proposed salt duty, which he opposed, in February and March 1732. He was elected again for Maidstone in a contest at the 1734 British general election.

Finch died on 1 January 1740, leaving a son and daughter. His son Savile Finch also represented Maidstone in Parliament.

Parliament of Great Britain
Preceded by Sir Barnham Rider; Sir Thomas Culpeper, Bt	Member of Parliament for Maidstone with Sir Thomas Culpeper, Bt 1722–1723; Sir Barnham Rider 1723–1727; Thomas Hope 1727–1734; William Horsemonden-Turner 1734–1740; 1722–1740	Succeeded by Hon. Robert Fairfax; William Horsemonden-Turner
