= Horsemonden =

Horsemonden may refer to:

- William Horsemonden, MP
- Horsmonden, village
