= Thomas Culpeper (disambiguation) =

Thomas Culpeper (c. 1514–1541) was a courtier at Henry VIII's court, executed for adultery with Queen Catherine Howard.

Thomas Culpeper (Culpepper or Colepeper) may also refer to:

- Thomas Colepeper (died 1613) (c. 1561–1613), MP for Winchelsea and Rye
- Thomas Colepeper (Royalist) (1578–1661), MP for Tewkesbury
- Thomas Colepeper, 2nd Baron Colepeper (1635–1689), Governor of Virginia
- Thomas Colepeper (colonel) (1637–1708), English colonel
- Sir Thomas Culpeper, 3rd Baronet (1656–1723), English MP
