= Thomas Hope (MP for Maidstone) =

British politician

Thomas Hope (fl. 1727 – 1734) of Maidstone, Kent, was a British Whig politician who sat in the House of Commons from 1727 to 1734.

Little is known of Hope's background, but he was from Kent, and possibly a butcher. He married Catherine Saunderson, a widow of Hammersmith, at St Magnus the Martyr on 5 September 1734.

Hope was returned in a contest as Member of Parliament (MP) for Maidstone with government support at the 1727 British general election. He voted consistently with the Administration, but was defeated at the 1734 British general election. He did not stand himself again, but was an active political agent on behalf of Walpole.

Parliament of Great Britain
| Preceded by Sir Barnham Rider; John Finch | Member of Parliament for Maidstone; 1727–1734; With: John Finch | Succeeded by William Horsemonden-Turner; John Finch |
