= Heneage Finch, 3rd Earl of Aylesford =

British peer and politician

Heneage Finch

Member of the British House of Commons
- In office 1745–1774
- Preceded by: John Buck
- Succeeded by: William Nedham
- Constituency: Leicestershire (1739-1741); Maidstone (1741-1747); Maidstone (1754-1757)

Personal details
- Born: 6 November 1715
- Died: 9 May 1777 (aged 61)
- Party: Whig
- Spouse: Lady Charlotte Seymour (m.1750)
- Children: Heneage, Charles, William, Edward, 4 other sons and 4 daughters
- Parents: Heneage Finch, 2nd Earl of Aylesford; Mary Fisher

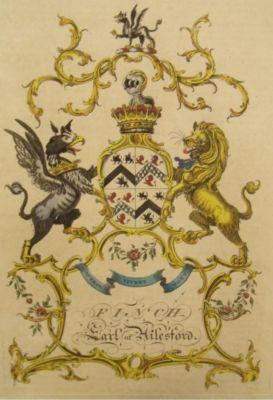
Heraldic achievement of Heneage Finch, 3rd Earl of Aylesford (1715-1777): Quarterly 1st & 4th: Argent, a chevron between three griffins passant sable (Finch); 2nd & 3rd: Argent, a chevron vair between three demi-lions rampant gules (Fisher of Great Packington, Warwickshire). Crest: A griffin passant sable. Supporters: dexter: A griffin sable ducally gorged or; sinister: A lion or ducally gorged azure

Heneage Finch, 3rd Earl of Aylesford (6 November 1715 – 9 May 1777), styled Lord Guernsey between 1719 and 1757, was a British peer and politician.

== Background and education ==
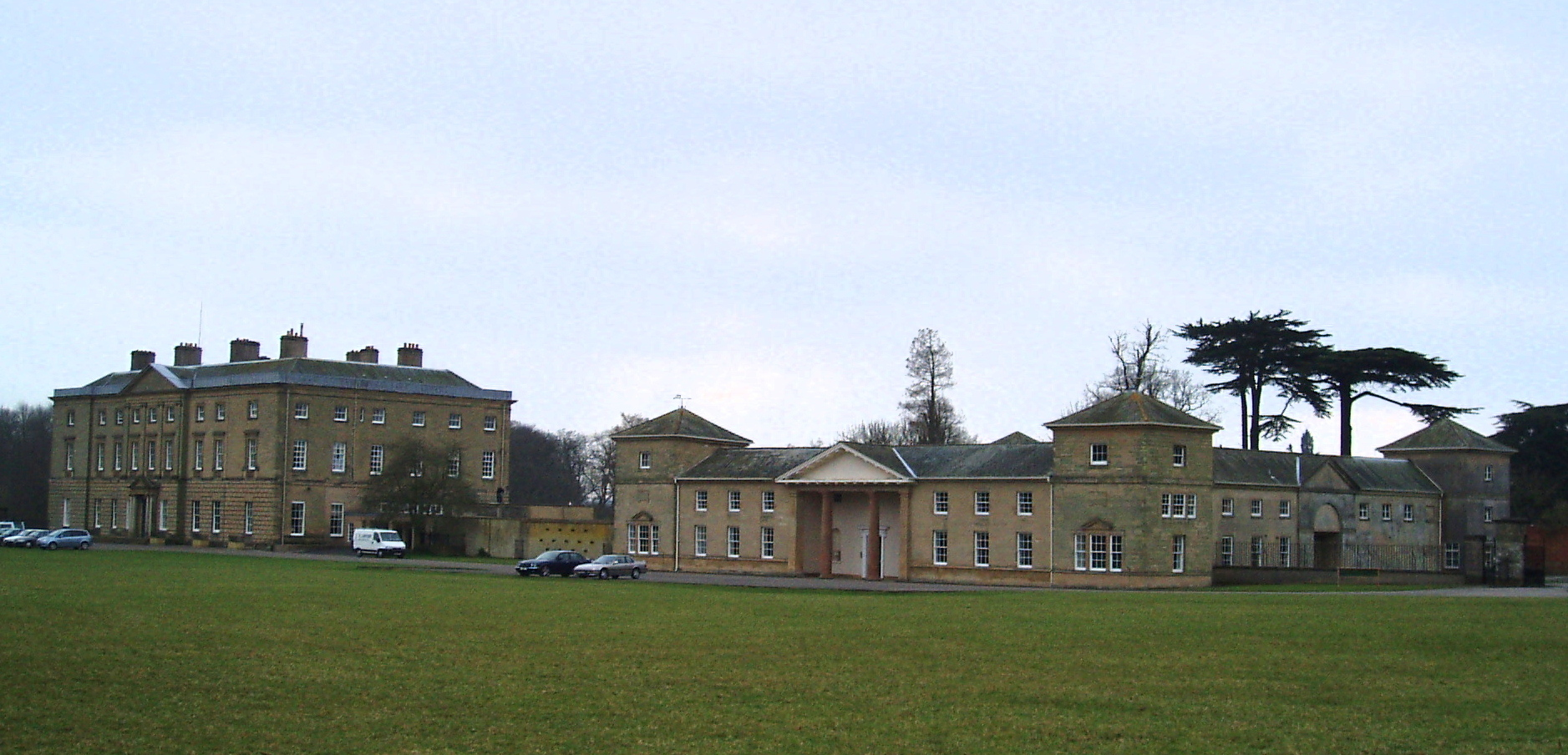
Packington Hall

Finch was the son and heir of Heneage Finch, 2nd Earl of Aylesford by his wife Mary Fisher, daughter and heiress of Sir Clement Fisher, 3rd Baronet of Packington Hall, Warwickshire. He was educated at University College, Oxford.

Finch's great grandfather was Heneage Finch, 1st Earl of Nottingham.

== Political career ==
As Lord Guernsey, he sat as Member of Parliament for Leicestershire from 1739 to 1741 and for Maidstone from 1741 to 1747 and again from 1754 to 1757. The latter year he succeeded his father in the earldom and entered the House of Lords.

== Family ==
Lord Aylesford married his 2nd cousin Lady Charlotte Seymour (1730-1805), daughter of Charles Seymour, 6th Duke of Somerset and Lady Charlotte Finch, daughter of Daniel Finch, 2nd Earl of Nottingham on 6 October 1750. She was reputed to be worth £50,000. They had twelve children:

- Heneage Finch, 4th Earl of Aylesford (1751–1812), married Lady Louisa Thynne on 18 November 1781 and had issue.
- Hon. Charles Finch (4 June 1752 – 17 September 1819), married Jane Wynne on 28 December 1778 and had issue.
- Adm. Hon. William Clement Finch (25 May 1753 – 30 September 1794), married Mary Brouncker on 2 August 1789 and had issue.
- Lady Charlotte Finch (13 May 1754 – 7 July 1808), married Henry Howard, 12th Earl of Suffolk on 14 August 1777 and had issue.
- Capt. Hon. John Finch (22 May 1755 – 29 June 1777), Coldstream Guards, mortally wounded at the Battle of Short Hills.
- Col. Hon. Edward Finch (26 April 1756 – 27 October 1843).
- Rev. Hon. Daniel Finch (3 April 1757 – 24 October 1840), prebendary of Gloucester and Fellow of All Souls.
- Capt. Hon. Seymour Finch (11 June 1758 – 2 February 1794), RN.
- Hon. Henry Allington Finch (26 February 1760 – 19 November 1780).
- Lady Frances Finch (9 February 1761 – 21 November 1838), married her second cousin once removed George Legge, 3rd Earl of Dartmouth on 29 September 1782 and had issue.
- Lady Maria Elizabeth Finch (7 October 1766 – 20 October 1848).
- Lady Henrietta Constantia Finch (3 June 1769 – 1814).

Lord Aylesford died at Grosvenor Square, Mayfair, London, in May 1777, aged 61, and was succeeded in the earldom by his eldest son, Heneage. The Countess of Aylesford died at Aylesford, Kent, in February 1805, aged 74.

Parliament of Great Britain
Preceded by Lord Grey; Edward Smith	Member of Parliament for Leicestershire; 1739–1741; With: Edward Smith	Succeeded by Sir Thomas Cave, Bt; Edward Smith
Preceded by William Horsemonden-Turner; Hon. Robert Fairfax	Member of Parliament for Maidstone; 1741–1747; With: Hon. John Bligh	Succeeded by William Horsemonden-Turner; Hon. Robert Fairfax
Preceded by Hon. Robert Fairfax; Gabriel Hanger	Member of Parliament for Maidstone; 1754–1757; With: Gabriel Hanger	Succeeded by Savile Finch; Gabriel Hanger
Peerage of Great Britain
Preceded by Heneage Finch	Earl of Aylesford; 1757–1777	Succeeded by Heneage Finch
