= William Horsemonden-Turner =

British politician

Member of Parliament for Maidstone
- In office 1747–1753 Serving with Hon. Robert Fairfax
- Preceded by: Lord Guernsey; Hon. Robert Fairfax
- Succeeded by: Hon. Robert Fairfax; Gabriel Hanger
- In office 1734–1741 Serving with John Finch, Hon. Robert Fairfax
- Preceded by: Thomas Hope; John Finch
- Succeeded by: Lord Guernsey; Hon. Robert Fairfax

Personal details
- Born: 23 April 1678
- Died: 14 April 1753 (aged 74)
- Party: Whig
- Spouses: Elizabeth Kenward Ward Bliss (m. 1725; died 1730) Elizabeth Read (m. 1745)

William Horsemonden-Turner (23 April 1678 – 14 April 1753) was an English attorney and Whig Member of Parliament.

== Early life ==
Horsemonden-Turner was born on 23 April 1678. He was the only son of Anthony Horsemonden of Maidstone, sometime clerk to the Skinners Co., by his second wife, the former Jane Turner, a daughter of Sir William Turner of Richmond.

His paternal grandparents were Ursual (née St. Leger) Horsemonden (daughter of Sir Warham St. Leger who owned Leeds Castle) and Daniel Horsemonden, D.D., Rector of Ulcombe.

== Career ==
A practising attorney, he succeeded his father's estates following his death, c. 1689, and that of his maternal uncle, John Turner, in 1721, upon which he took additional surname of Turner.

Horsemonden-Turner he became the leader of the Whigs in Maidstone, where he was returned as a Member of Parliament for Maidstone as a government supporter in 1734. He was defeated in 1741, after which he took advantage of the dissolution of the Maidstone corporation to secure from the Lord Chancellor a new charter favourable to the popular party. He was returned with it to Maidstone immediately before the general election of 1747; and was elected, bringing in with him Robert Fairfax.

According to a note by Frederick, Prince of Wales, in Lord Egmont's electoral survey c. 1750, Turner was governed by John Scrope of the Treasury.

== Personal life ==
On 25 May 1725, Horsemonden-Turner married the 76 year-old brewery heiress Elizabeth (née Kenward) Ward Bliss (died 1730), a daughter of John Kenward of Yalding and the widow of both Ambrose Ward of Yalding and Thomas Bliss, MP of Maidstone. In 1726, he acquired the estate of Stede Hill near Harrietsham, Kent from the Edwyn Stede, son of Sir John Stede who built the mansion.

After the death of his first wife on 27 October 1730, he married, secondly, on 19 December 1745 to Elizabeth Read, a daughter of Richard Read of Lenham and Gravesend.

Horsemonden-Turner died on 14 April 1753. His widow Elizabeth held Stede Hall until her death in 1782. Per Horsemonden-Turner's will, Stede Hall and the rest of his estates were inherited by Charles Booth, Esq. who was later knighted. After his death in 1795, the entailed manor passed to William Baldwin, Esq. of Harrietsham.

Parliament of Great Britain
Preceded by Thomas Hope; John Finch	Member of Parliament for Maidstone; 1734–1741; With: John Finch 1734–1740; Hon. Robert Fairfax 1740–1741	Succeeded by Lord Guernsey; Hon. Robert Fairfax
Preceded by Lord Guernsey; Hon. Robert Fairfax	Member of Parliament for Maidstone; 1747–1753; With: Hon. Robert Fairfax	Succeeded by Hon. Robert Fairfax; Gabriel Hanger
