= Gabriel Hanger, 1st Baron Coleraine =

English politician

Gabriel Hanger, 1st Baron Coleraine (9 January 1697 – 24 January 1773), was an English politician who sat in the House of Commons between 1753 and 1768. He was honoured with a peerage in the Peerage of Ireland.

Hanger was the son of Sir George Hanger of Driffield, Gloucestershire and his wife Ann Beale daughter of Sir John Beale of Farningham in Kent. His father, grandson of Sir Lewis Roberts, was knighted by William III "for his steady attachment to religion and the law."

Hanger inherited his father's estate at Driffield and also inherited via his brother his mother's estate at Farningham. In 1750 he was responsible for converting the church at Driffield into the Italianate style. It was later converted back.

Hanger sat as a Member of Parliament (MP) for Maidstone between 1753 and 1761.

On 26 February 1762 he was raised to the Peerage of Ireland as Baron Coleraine. Hanger's uncle, John Hanger, was governor of the Bank of England 1719-1721 and his daughter, Anne, had married Henry (Henry Hare) 3rd and last Lord Coleraine. When Henry Hare died in 1749 without a legitimate heir the peerage had become extinct. It was revived in 1762 for Gabriel Hanger, who was made 1st Baron Coleraine of the second creation. As the peerage was Irish he was able to continue to sit in the House of Commons and was afterwards MP for Bridgwater between 1763 and 1768. He was described by his son as "one of those respectable, independent old English characters in the House of Commons called County Gentlemen".

Lord Coleraine died at Bray in Berkshire at the age of 73 and was buried at Driffield.

Hanger married Elizabeth Bond, daughter and heir of Richard Bond, of Hereford at Driffield in 1753. There were seven children which included three surviving sons John, William and George. George wrote a piece of doggerel

Three pretty boys did Gabriel get,
The youngest George by name, Sir
A funny dog, not favoured much
By fortune or by fame, Sir.

Parliament of Great Britain
Preceded by William Horsemonden-Turner; Hon. Robert Fairfax	Member of Parliament for Maidstone with Hon. Robert Fairfax 1753–1754; Lord Guernsey 1754–1757; Savile Finch 1757–1761; 1753–1761	Succeeded by Rose Fuller; William Northey
Preceded by Viscount Perceval; Edward Southwell	Member of Parliament for Bridgwater; 1763–1768; With: Viscount Perceval	Succeeded by Viscount Perceval; Benjamin Allen
Peerage of Ireland
New creation	Baron Coleraine; 1762–1773	Succeeded by John Hanger
