= Savile Finch =

English politician

Savile Finch (baptised 22 September 1736 – 20 September 1788) was an English politician who sat in the House of Commons from 1757 to 1780.

Finch was the only son of the Honourable John Finch, younger son of Heneage Finch, 1st Earl of Aylesford. His mother was Mary, daughter and heiress of John Savile, of Methley-hall, Yorkshire. He was baptised in Aylesford.

Finch sat as a Member of Parliament for Maidstone from 1757 to 1761 and for Malton from 1761 to 1780.

Finch married Judith Fullerton, daughter of John Fullerton. They had no children and Finch bequeathed the estates to his wife. After his death, she lived at Thrybergh for twenty years and when she died in 1803 left the estate to the Fullerton family.

Parliament of Great Britain
Preceded by Lord Guernsey; Gabriel Hanger	Member of Parliament for Maidstone; 1757–1761; With: Gabriel Hanger	Succeeded by Rose Fuller; William Northey
Preceded by Henry Finch; John Mostyn	Member of Parliament for Malton; 1761–1780; With: John Mostyn 1761–1768; The Viscount Downe 1768–1774; Edmund Burke 1774–1775; William Weddell 1775–1780	Succeeded by Edmund Burke; William Weddell
