= William Culpepper =

William Culpepper may refer to:

- William T. Culpepper III, (born 1947) American politician
- William Colepeper (died 1726), English politician and poet
- Sir William Culpeper, 1st Baronet of Preston Hall (1588–1651), of the Culpeper baronets
- Sir William Culpeper, 1st Baronet of Wakehurst (died 1651), of the Culpeper baronets
- Sir William Culpeper, 4th Baronet (1668–1740), of the Culpeper baronets
