= John Culpepper (disambiguation) =

John Culpepper (c. 1761–1841) was an American politician.

John Culpepper, Culpeper or Colepeper may also refer to:

- John Colepeper, 1st Baron Colepeper (c. 1600–1660), English Royalist landowner, military adviser, politician, Chancellor of the Exchequer, Master of the Rolls and influential counsellor of King Charles I during the English Civil War
- John Culpeper (died 1414), English knight
- John Culpeper (rebel) (1644–1694), leader of Culpeper's Rebellion in 1677 in the province of Carolina in North America
- J. Broward Culpepper, John Broward Culpepper (1907–1990), influence on university education in Florida
- Brad Culpepper, John Broward Culpepper (born 1969), American National Football League player
- John Culpepper (MP) for Rutland (UK Parliament constituency)
