= Romney Manor =

Coordinates: 17°19′33″N 62°48′04″W

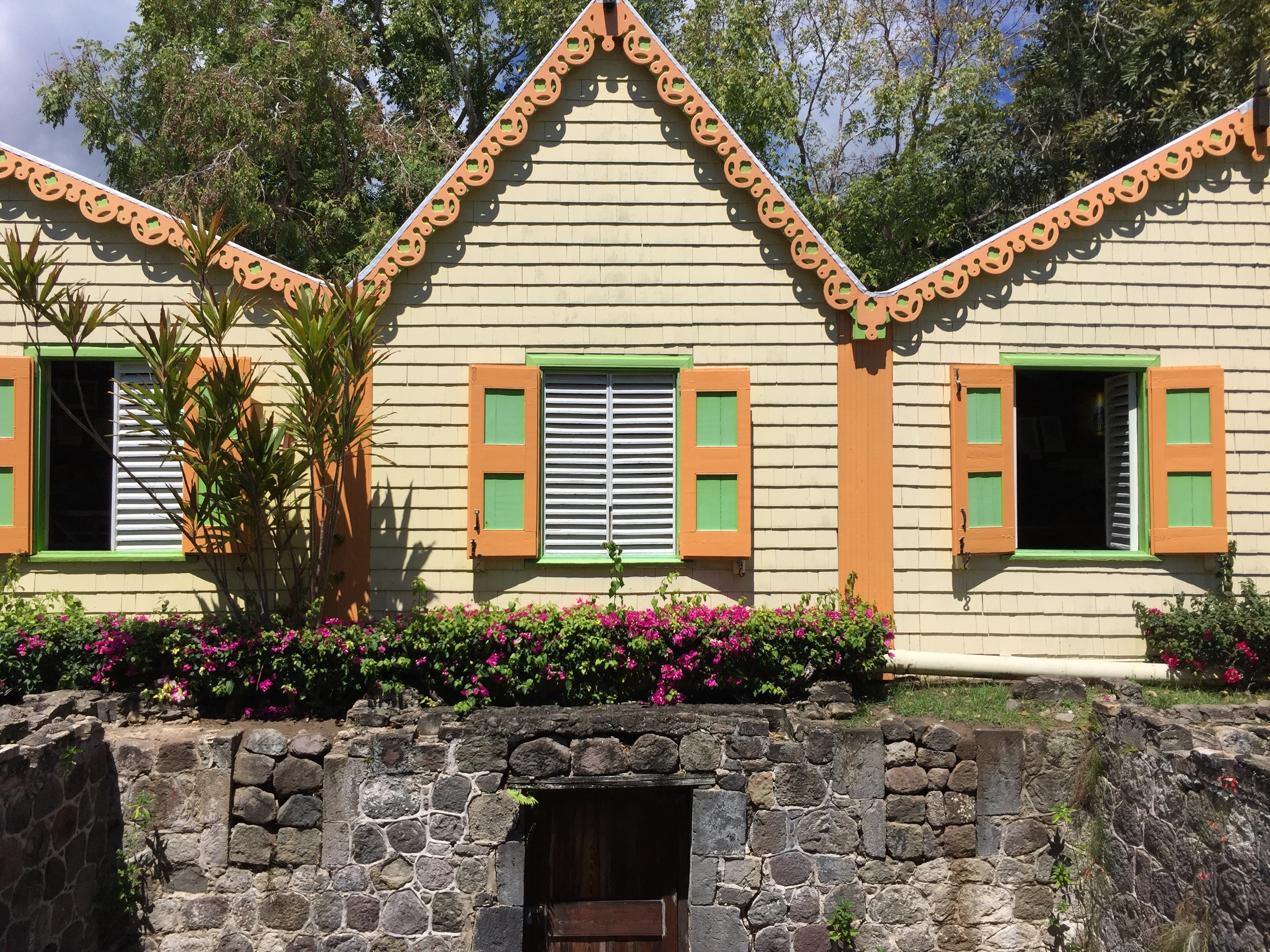
Caribelle Batik at Romney Manor

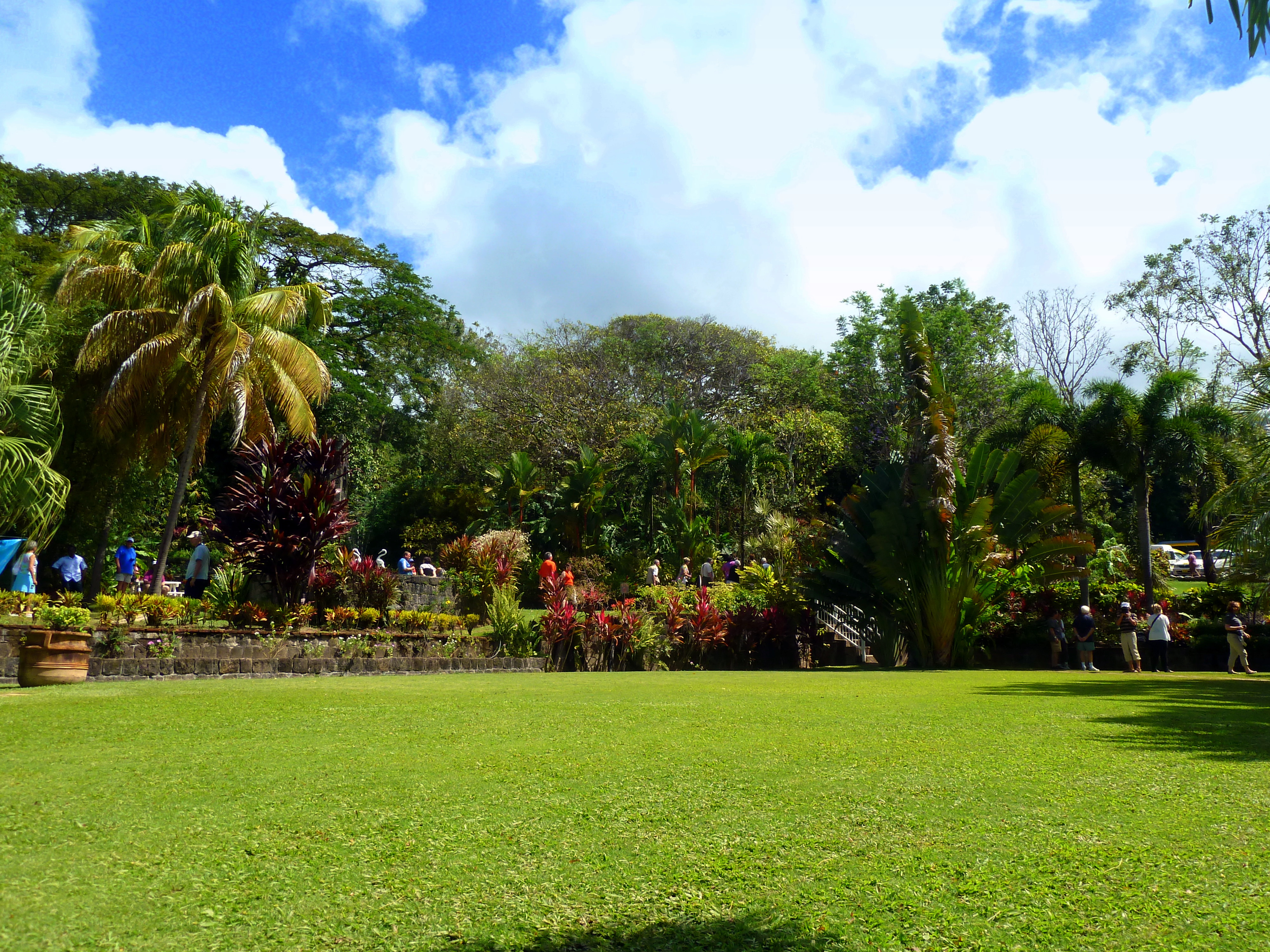
The botanical gardens

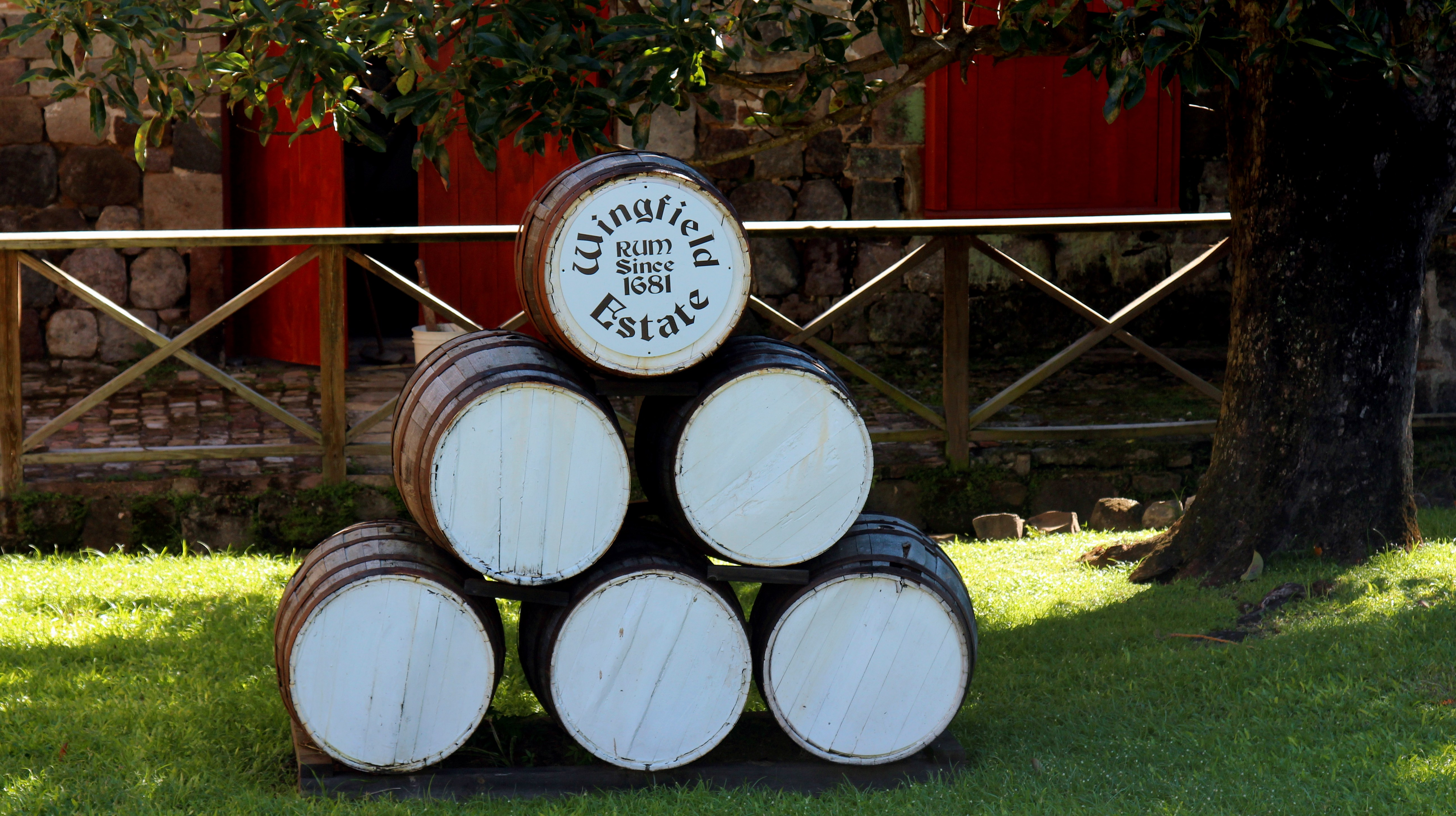
Rum barrels on the estate

Romney Manor is a building in the Wingfield Estate in Saint Kitts. Samuel Jefferson (great-great grandfather of Thomas Jefferson) bought the estate in 1625 and established a sugar plantation there. It was subsequently named after the Earl of Romney, who bought it from the Jeffersons in 1713. The sugar plantation used slave labour until 1834. Today it is a tourist destination, home to a batik enterprise and a botanical garden.
