= Thomas Bliss (MP) =

English politician

Thomas Bliss (ca. 1647 – 8 October 1721) was an English Tory politician who sat in the House of Commons in two periods between 1698 and 1708.

Bliss was elected Member of Parliament (MP) for Maidstone, where he owned a brewery, in 1698 and was returned unopposed in January 1701. In November 1701 he was re-elected despite a smear campaign which accused him of Jacobitism. In July 1702 he was defeated in the poll, but the election was declared void because of corruption by the Whigs and the writ for the constituency was suspended until 1704. Bliss was re-elected for Maidstone in 1704 and held the seat until 1708 when he did not stand. His political battles continued in the borough where he was re-admitted as alderman in 1710 but declared as not chosen by the Whig majority in 1711.

Parliament of England
| Preceded by Sir John Banks, Bt; Thomas Rider | Member of Parliament for Maidstone; 1698–1702; With: Sir Robert Marsham, Bt | Succeeded by Sir Thomas Roberts, Bt; Sir Robert Marsham, Bt |
| Vacant Writ suspended | Member of Parliament for Maidstone; 1704–1708; With: Hon. Heneage Finch; Sir Thomas Culpeper, Bt | Succeeded by Sir Robert Marsham, Bt; Sir Thomas Culpeper, Bt |
