= Edmund Culpeper =

Culpeper, Edmund (c.1670–1737), scientific instrument maker

Edmund Culpeper (1660–1738) was an English scientific instrument maker, based in London, who was known for his three-legged compound microscopes now known as Culpeper-type microscopes. Examples of his work are held in science museums in Cambridge, London, and Madrid.

== Life ==
Culpeper was born in Tarrant Gunville in 1660. He was a highly skilled English craftsman. He began his career as an engraver. Later Culpeper dedicated himself to the construction of scientific instruments, achieving fame principally in the optical and mathematical fields. He took over the scientific instrument business of Walter Hayes, to whom he had been apprenticed, after Hayes's death in 1685. Culpeper traded at Cross Daggers, Moorfield from 1700 until 1731, and was then based near the Royal Exchange, Cornhill in 1737.

After making simple microscopes, Culpeper turned to tripod-mounted compound microscopes, introducing major changes and improvements in their mechanical and optical systems. Such instruments are now known as "Culpeper-type microscopes". Culpeper's microscopes were popular in England and America, and considerably cheaper than other instruments available at the time. Some early examples had cardboard parts, while later models were brass or bronze.

Examples of Culpeper's microscopes are at the University of Cambridge's Whipple Museum of the History of Science, the Science Museum in London, and in the Perea-Borobio Microscope Collection of the Spanish Society of Infectious Diseases and Clinical Microbiology (SEIMC) in Madrid. The Science Museum in London also holds a number of other instruments made by Culpeper, including a sundial, a protractor and a mariner's dial.
