= List of The Wolves of Mercy Falls characters =

This is a list of characters in The Wolves of Mercy Falls trilogy, a series of young adult science fiction novels by Maggie Stiefvater. Including the books Shiver, Linger and Forever all set in the fictional Minnesota town of Mercy Falls, which is close to the real town Ely.

== Main characters ==
=== Grace Brisbane ===
Grace Brisbane
- The Wolves of Mercy Falls trilogy character
- First appearance: Shiver
- Last appearance: Forever
- Created by: Maggie Stiefvater

In-universe information
- Nicknames: Good Looking (by John); The Girl (by Sam)
- Species: Human/Werewolf
- Gender: Female
- Occupation: High school student
- Family: Amy Brisbane (mother); Lewis Brisbane (father)
- Significant other: Samuel Roth (boyfriend)

Grace Brisbane was taken from her backyard tire swing and attacked by the wolves behind her house when she was 11. When she is saved from them by a yellowed-eyed wolf, Sam, she begins to feel a deep connection with him, often referring to him as "Her Wolf", and spending much of the winter months looking out for him. In Shiver they meet after Sam is shot by Tom Culpeper during a hunt of the wolves following Jack Culpeper's "death", and begin a strange yet touching relationship. However, in Linger it is not Sam's humanity that is in jeopardy but Grace's, as she comes down with an unknown illness and almost dies. She is re-bitten by Cole and shifts at the end of Linger. In Forever, Grace tries to make her way back to Sam, but in her wolf form and with the ever present worry of shifting, it becomes hard. Eventually, after a run-in with a sinkhole (that Shelby chased her into) Cole and Sam had to drag her out of before she drowned, she and Sam are reunited. And as the wolves are hunted by Isabel's father, she risks losing not only her friends but her life. She helps Sam lead the pack to the new peninsula, with help from Cole and Isabel. She completed high school after the wolf hunt through summer school. She has dark blonde hair and brown eyes, described as a dark brown, almost black. She has a keen interest in math. She expresses the view that she has raised herself because her parents were barely ever home.

=== Samuel Roth ===
Samuel Roth
- The Wolves of Mercy Falls trilogy character
- First appearance: Shiver
- Last appearance: Forever
- Created by: Maggie Stiefvater

In-universe information
- Nicknames: Sam (everyone); Romulus (Isabel); Ringo (Cole); The Boy (Rachel)
- Species: Werewolf/Human
- Gender: Male
- Occupation: Bookstore employee
- Family: Annette Roth (incarcerated mother); Gregory Roth (incarcerated father); Geoffrey Beck (adoptive father)
- Significant other: Grace Brisbane (girlfriend)

Samuel Kerr "Sam" Roth was bitten by Beck, who needed young blood to keep the wolf pack going, when he was only 7 as he waited for his school bus, before Shiver. Sam was raised in Duluth. After his parents tried to kill him by holding him down in a bath and cutting both his wrists, he was adopted by Beck, age 8. Both his parents got life sentences for the attempted murder of their son. After Grace is pulled off her tire swing and almost killed by the wolves, Sam saves her by shifting and carrying her home. When the wolves are hunted, after the "death" of Jack Culpeper, and he is shot, Grace finds him, naked, on her back porch and they start a relationship. When they both discover that by injecting meningitis into their system, and inducing a fever, shifting will be stopped, Sam and Jack volunteer to be injected. Jack later dies and after Sam shifts halfway through the injection, Grace assumes that he has died too. He did survive and they are reunited at the end of Shiver. During Linger Sam has to come to terms that he is now fully human. And when an increasingly sick Grace calls out in her sleep, her parents find out Sam has spent the night, and Lewis forbids her from seeing her again, ground her and Amy drives to the hospital. Leaving Sam alone, with the knowledge that something is wrong with Grace, but not knowing what. He then spends his nights alone in Beck's house with only new werewolf Cole and 11 years worth of memories. His birthday falls during the events in Linger – his birthday falling in March. Grace presents him with studio time in a local Duluth recording studio 'Anarchy Incorporated'. He loses Grace at the end of Linger when she was re-infected with the wolf toxin by Cole, to save her from dying, and shifts, running into Boundary Wood. In Forever, when the wolves are under threat, Sam is injected by Cole so he can shift and lead the wolves out of boundary wood and to the peninsula Officer Koenig gave them. He prefers tea to coffee. He has a strong passion for guitar and song-writing, often coming up with lyrics during key scenes in the book. He has black hair, an "interesting shaped nose" and wolfish yellow eyes.

=== Isabel Culpeper ===
Isabel Culpeper
- The Wolves of Mercy Falls trilogy character
- First appearance: Shiver
- Last appearance: Sinner
- Created by: Maggie Stiefvater

In-universe information
- Species: Human
- Gender: Female
- Occupation: High school student
- Family: Dr. Teresa Culpeper (mother); Tom Culpeper (father); Jack Culpeper (deceased older brother)
- Significant other: Cole St. Clair (soon to be boyfriend)

Isabel Rosemary Culpeper was the sister of Jack Culpeper until he died in "Shiver". She and her family were originally from California, but moved to Minnesota when Isabel was 14, before the books started. She found out about the wolves after Jack, whom the town believed to be dead, came to her. She was later told the whole story by Sam and Grace. It was because of Isabel that they were able to get meningitis infected blood from her mother's clinic. Isabel stays with Jack as he is slowly killed by the meningitis, and blames herself for his death. She and Cole have an on-off sort of relationship throughout the trilogy, which started when Isabel found him walking around her house naked. After Linger and before Forever we are told that Cole left more than twenty voicemails on Isabel's phone, none of which she picked up on. And at the start of Forever, after she saves Cole's life she immediately leaves when he begins to speak to her. During the course of Forever they grow back together, and Isabel helps him break into the health clinic, so he won't break into the high school, so he can find a microscope and test his blood. At the end of Forever, Isabel is heart broken when she assumes Cole has been killed, and cries with relief when he phones her in the second last chapter. Isabel was sent back to California, to her grandparents', by her parents after she interrupted the hunt to help the wolves escape. She is a highly sarcastic person, and is described as 'cold' and as an 'Ice Princess' by other characters. When she lived in California she attended Santa Maria Academy, where her best friend was Isabel D. whom Isabel describes as a 'bitch', but it is clear she misses her old life. She has long blonde hair in Shiver which she cuts before the start of Linger, and blue eyes.

=== Cole St. Clair ===
Cole St. Clair
- The Wolves of Mercy Falls trilogy character
- First appearance: Linger
- Last appearance: Sinner
- Created by: Maggie Stiefvater

In-universe information
- Nickname: NARKOTIKA (by himself)
- Species: Werewolf
- Gender: Male
- Occupation: Band Member (NARKOTIKA)
- Family: Dr. George St. Clair (father); Mrs. St. Clair (mother); Unnamed brother
- Significant others: Isabel Culpeper (soon to be girlfriend); Angie Baranova (ex-girlfriend)

Cole St. Clair was bitten and infected along with two others, his friend and bandmate Victor being one of them, while touring for NARKOTIKA, his band, in Canada by Beck and Salem. He was introduced in Linger. He is originally from Phoenix in New York State where he lived with his scientist father. He expressed his love for his Mustang, and that it was the only thing he truly missed from his life before being a wolf. In Forever Isabel gives him a small die cast black Mustang. After becoming a wolf he quit the band, of which he was lead vocalist, keyboardist and frontman. He was known to have led a troubled life, experimenting with drugs, of which his track marks are proof, and sleeping with his female fans whilst on tour. He dated Angie Baranova, Victor's sister, before the books, but after admitting he had slept with fans whilst on tour she left him. His, and Victor's, celebrity identity remained a secret to Isabel, Grace and Sam for the majority of Linger, but after he and Isabel were approached by a trio of Cole's fans, he had to explain himself. Likewise, Sam and Grace found out about him whilst they were visiting a recording studio in Duluth where Sam saw a magazine cover on display with NARKOTIKA featured. In Forever he frequently injects himself as a way of finding a real cure for shifting. After breaking into the health clinic and checking his blood under a microscope, he comes to the conclusion that, like malaria, there is no cure to shifting into a wolf, only prevention and treatment to reduce the symptoms (shifting). He was able to catch Beck and make him shift so he, Sam and Grace could ask Beck how he moved the wolves from Wyoming to Minnesota. After being told that Hannah, with guidance from Derek, was able to keep human thoughts while in her wolf body, Cole attempted to do the same. Eventually he realised he could not, but that Sam could, so they both decided Sam would have to shift and lead the wolves out, when Cole would travel beside them and send him picture messages to guide him. During the discussion with Beck, Cole stated he would buy the peninsula from Koenig, telling him that it was the least he could do for the pack. He was almost killed in Forever by Shelby, being so badly injured that the other characters, including Isabel, had assumed him dead, but survived. He calls Isabel, in California, from Beck's house in the final chapters of Forever to let her know he is alive. He is described as having brown hair and green eyes.

=== Shelby ===
Shelby
- The Wolves of Mercy Falls trilogy character
- First appearance: Shiver
- Last appearance: Forever
- Created by: Maggie Stiefvater

In-universe information
- Nicknames: White She-Wolf (by Grace); The White One (by Grace); The Pissy One (by Cole)
- Species: Werewolf
- Gender: Female

Shelby is a troubled werewolf who was taken in by the pack after Beck found and took her from a place that was never named, but it is assumed she was sexually and physically abused there. Shelby relishes the fact that becoming a wolf lets her forget her past. Throughout the trilogy, Sam states that what Shelby wanted most was for Sam to take over from Paul as alpha, when she would then be his mate. She attempts to kill Grace in Shiver to achieve this goal of hers, she fails when Sam steps in. During her attack on Grace, Lewis Brisbane shoots her. Grace thought she had been killed, but in the last chapters of Shiver she is seen outside the health clinic silently watching. It is assumed that she was the one who attacked Paul, almost killing him, in Shiver, as a way of letting Sam take over as Alpha. In Forever she kills Olivia, in the prologue which she narrates. Olivia's death results in many difficult situations for Sam, including him almost being arrested for both Olivia's death, and Grace's disappearance. She also attempted to kill Grace again by chasing her through the woods after Grace shifts, she is unable to finish the task as Grace falls into a sinkhole and almost drowns. She is killed by Cole during the final scenes in Forever. She is close in age to Sam and is said to have white-blonde hair, and white fur in her wolf form. We are told that she has a strong southern accent.

== Major Human Characters ==
- Rachel Vega is one of Grace's best friends. She is described as being hyperactive with wild light-brown hair and freckles and as being the glue that held the group, Grace, Rachel and Olivia, together. She lives with her father, step-mother and siblings. She believed that Sam had kidnapped Grace in Forever, but told him she didn't believe he killed her. She was told about the wolves by both Sam and Grace in Forever after she is picked up from school. She helps Grace and Sam keep their secret from Grace's parents, and lies to them about taking Grace with her to Norway. In truth, she was going alone and had to lie about taking Grace along to keep her from shape-shifting in front of her non-suspecting parents. She creates many nicknames for the characters in the trilogy, 'The Boy' for Sam, and 'Ice Princess', 'Tundra Queen' and 'she-of-the-pointy-boots' for Isabel, in relation to her cold-heartedness.
- Amy Brisbane is Grace's mother. She is an artist and is described as absentminded, and almost always being paint splattered. Both her parents were described as giving Grace a lot of space when she was growing up, making her the independent person she is, so much so that they did not notice when Sam stayed in Grace's room at night. She is approached by Sam, after a girl's body (Olivia's) was found When Grace left, who tells her the body was not Grace's. She got a kitten to help with the loss, showing how little Grace mattered to her. Amy offers a compromise to Grace, that she completes high school and keeps in touch with them while they let her see Sam.
- Lewis Brisbane is Grace's father. He joined Isabel's father in the first wolf hunt in Shiver, after Jack "died", which led to Grace falling out with him, as she believed he might have been the one to shoot Sam. He shot Shelby when she attacked Grace in the Brisbane's kitchen in Shiver. In Linger he bans Sam from seeing Grace, when he is found in her room after curfew. As parents, Lewis and Amy, were described by Grace as choosing when they wanted to be parents and when they wanted to be room-mates. A couple of months after Grace's wolf attack, at age 11, her father left her locked in a car on what was said to be "the hottest May day on record in Mercy Falls".
- Officer William Koenig is a police officer who was introduced in Shiver. He had small parts in the first two books, but got a larger part when he was told about the wolves by Sam in Forever. He tells Sam that his father had told him stories of a University friend who had been a werewolf, and this was the reason he believed Sam about the pack. He gave a family owned peninsula to the pack, when he heard about how Tom Culpeper planned to hunt the wolves, as a way to save the pack.
- Tom Culpeper is Isabel and Jack Culpeper's father. He is argumentative with his wife. He has a large collection of taxidermy, including a wolf, which Sam suspects of being one of the werewolves. He is told to be a small-town lawyer and egomaniac Tom has a strong hatred of the wolves, that stems from the fact he believes his son to be killed by them. He organises a hunt in Shiver, and another larger cull in Forever to rid Mercy Falls of them. He pays little attention to Isabel unless it suits him.

== Major Werewolf Characters ==
- Geoffrey Beck known as Beck to those closest to him. He told Cole he was bitten by Paul when he was suicidal. But told Grace in Shiver he was bitten at the age of 28, while on a hiking vacation in Canada and that he had heard there were wolves in Minnesota, and guessed they were of his kind, he met Paul who then took him "under his wing". It is unknown which story is true He was Sam's adoptive father. He is a lawyer during the summer months, when he was human, he bought a house for the pack from the money he earned. His wife, Jen, died of breast cancer after Beck had been infected, it is known that he mourned for her on the day she died every year after her death. After she died, Beck became transfixed on Sam. He believed he could be a better parent, and raise Sam as his own. He was the leader of the pack when they were in their human forms. Beck shifted into a wolf permanently, leaving Sam and Cole with the responsibility of taking care of the pack. He shifted back to human shortly in Forever after Cole captured and injected him. He was told of the hunt and during the conversation said that he wanted to stay with the pack; If they died, he died, and if they lived, he lived. He was killed in Forever by Tom Culpeper during the hunt. He was 48 years old and had dark auburn hair and blue eyes. A little known fact is that, in the first draft of the novel, Beck was named Grant. His name was changed because 'Grant' was too similar to 'Grace'.
- Olivia Marx was also one of Grace's best friends. She was, along with Grace, fascinated by the wolves in Mercy Falls. Grace calls her the embodiment of summer with her tanned skin and green eyes. She was bitten by Jack Culpeper in Shiver, because Jack hoped Grace would tell him the Cure to help Olivia. She had the choice to be injected with meningitis, but decided she would rather be a wolf than take the risk. She was murdered by Shelby in Forever. Sam is questioned about her death, as she was just outside Beck's property line when Shelby killed her. Her brother, John Marx, found her death hard to come to terms with and blamed Sam for her death, and almost had a fist-fight with him outside a Quik-Mart before Cole stepped in. She is sometimes called Olive as a nickname by her friends.
- Jack Culpeper was Isabel's brother and also a werewolf. He was bitten after he taunted the pack with a BB gun, and was so badly injured he was pronounced dead, he later healed himself and ran from the morgue. The whole of Mercy Falls mourned his death, and the high school students wore black for weeks after his "death". He is told to have clung to his old life after he left the morgue, for example walking around the parking lot of the school in his wolf form, and breaking into his parents house. He bit Olivia while in his human form, a fact that disgusted Grace when she was told. He died in Shiver when Grace injected him with bacterial meningitis in an attempt to stop him shifting. He was described as being a violent and aggressive individual, even before he was bitten.
- Victor Baranova was Cole's bandmate in NARKOTIKA, in which he was drummer. He had a sister, Angie, whom Cole dated and cheated on multiple times with female fans. He was bitten, because Cole did not want to go alone, in Canada whilst on tour. He was shot by Tom Culpeper in Linger and was buried by Cole, Sam and Grace.
- Ulrik is a werewolf. We are told he is from Germany, and has kept his accent even after all the years he spent in America. He taught Sam how to bake bread, and he is where Sam got his love for German poetry, especially of the poet Rilke. He drove the car that brought Beck and Paul to Duluth so they could bite and infect Sam.
- Paul is a werewolf and is the leader, alpha male, when the pack is in its wolf form. He was the one who got Sam interested in guitar. He is a large black wolf. Paul held Sam down while Beck bit him in Duluth.

== Minor Human Characters ==
- John Marx is Olivia's older brother. It is clear from his interactions with Grace in Shiver that he is attracted to her and calls her 'Gorgeous', but Grace assumed that it was all just an act until the look on his face when he saw Sam and she thought it must have been more serious than she thought. After Olivia's disappearance, he became worried for her, clinging to any information from her. He blames Sam for Olivia's death, and after a run-in at a convenience store in Forever, keys Sam's car.
- Karyn is Sam's employer, she owns The Crooked Shelf, the independent bookstore where Sam sometimes works. She is friendly with Beck, but doesn't know him well enough to call him by his last name, instead of his first. She becomes defensive of Sam when Officer Koenig come to take him for questioning in relation to Olivia's death, and Grace's disappearance.
- Dr. Teresa Culpeper is Isabel and Jack's mother. She volunteers in a low-income health clinic twice a week in Shiver. It is known that during her education she experienced severe family problems and almost gave up.
- Angie was Victor's sister before his death. She dated Cole, but left him after he told her he had slept with female fans while on tour.
- Dmitra works at the studio, Anarchy Incorporated, in which Sam records a demo in Linger. Whilst at the recording studio Sam and Grace discover the true identity of Cole St. Clair.
- Congressman Landy Marshall backed Tom Culpeper in the cull of the wolves in Forever. Isabel states that her mother and Mr. Marshall had had a relationship before Mrs. Culpeper met Isabel's father.
- Mr. Dario and his two guard dogs moved into a house 75 acres away from Beck's house, becoming Sam's closest neighbour as he grew up. Mr. Dario owned his two pure white guard dogs to protect his antique business – drugs. Both dogs were fitted with electric collars so they were shocked if they moved outside Mr. Dario's property, the charge was measured from a small black box that left powdery black paint on the hands of whoever touched it. Sam was so worried about the dogs that he asked Beck to teach him how to kill them, they practised breaking bones at the joint with dead chickens and watched dog fights. Later, the dogs were released by Shelby, who was spotted by Sam with the black powder on her hands, and they attacked Paul, almost killing him before Sam stepped in, killing one dog and keeping the other away from Paul before Beck ran out to shoot the other dog.
- Annette and Gregory Roth are Sam's parents. They thought he was possessed by the devil and tried to kill him by cutting both his wrists with razor whilst they held him down in a bath. We are told in Linger that Sam used to scream when he heard running water during his adoption to Beck, and he could not bear the sight of a bathtub until Forever, when he finally overcame his fear. Annette was the one who originally decided that Sam shouldn't be allowed to live and later told a neighbour that her son was taking too long to die, they were both arrested.
- Jen Beck was the wife of Beck. She was already a terminal cancer patient when she met Beck. She and Beck had always wanted children, but as she only had 8 months left to live after they got married, the dream was impossible.
- Jackie a young female fan of Cole's, who gave him unnamed drugs. They caused Cole to pass out on the floor of the club he was performing at. It is assumed the man Cole saw during this concert was Beck, who later recruited him and Victor, to the wolf pack.
- Jeremy a fellow member of NARKOTIKA with Cole and Victor. He describes himself as a 'part-time Buddhist'. Cole calls him in Forever.
- Madison, Taylor and Mackenzie were friends of Isabel. She talks about Madison and Taylor in Forever when she needs an excuse to get out of the house. And leaves school with Mackenzie.
- Ben owns the fish and tackle shop Grace enters on her search for a phone at the start of Forever. She phones Sam from Ben's shop but shifts before he arrives. Ben is described as has a body odor problem, and a wife whose laugh is like a dog's bark.

== Minor Werewolf Characters ==
- Christa Bohlman was a werewolf Sam remembers in Shiver, though she was killed before the book began. She was a reckless person, much like Shelby, who killed two people and bit a third, Derek. Sam watched from the stairs as Christa and Beck had an argument, about the two people and Derek, which ended in Beck ordering her from the pack, and shooting her. She was later buried by Beck and Ulrik.
- Derek was bitten by Christa. He was shot and killed during the hunt, in Shiver, that Tom Culpeper organised.
- Salem is described multiple times as the "crazy, bindle wolf". He has a notched ear and a "foul, running eye". Sam suspects that he was the one who pulled Grace off her tire swing, and the one who, with Shelby, infected Jack Culpeper. He and Beck went to Canada to recruit new members of the wolf pack, but Salem shifted before they got back. Salem is the omega of the pack.
- Unnamed Girl She was bitten by Beck in Canada with Cole and Victor. She appears in "Shiver", and Sam briefly mentions her and Victor as "the other two" while speaking with Grace in "Linger".
- Hannah is a wolf made reference to in Shiver and Forever. She is mentioned in Beck's journal, and she guided the wolves out of Wyoming when they were being hunted and killed by the natural wolf population.
- Melissa a werewolf mentioned once in Forever.
- Derrick a werewolf mentioned once in Forever.
