= Baron Colepeper =

Extinct barony in the Peerage of England

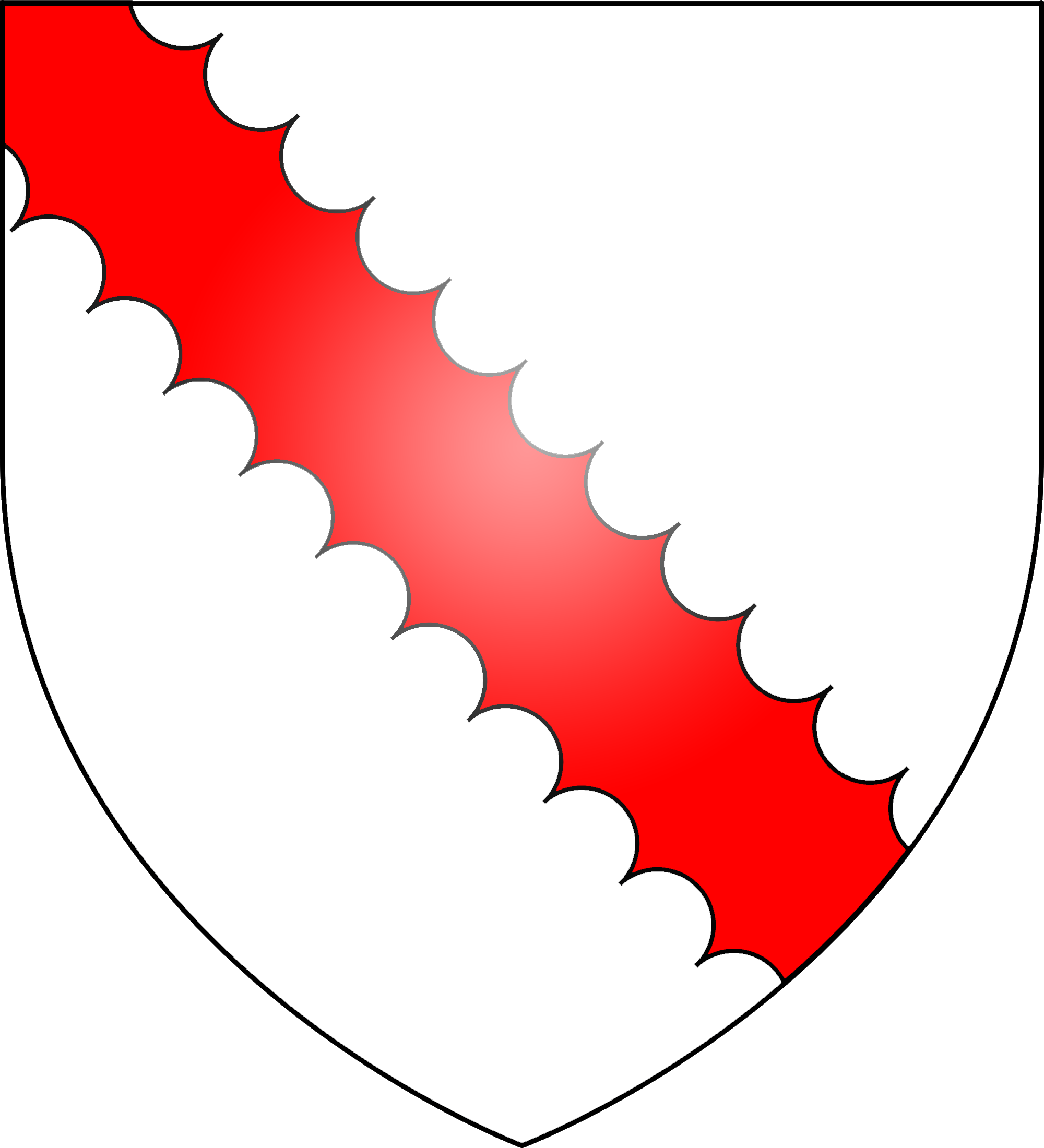
Arms of Colepeper

Baron Colepeper is an extinct title in the Peerage of England. Colepeper is sometimes rendered Culpeper, Baron Colepeper of Thoresway, or Baron Thoresway. The barony was created in 1644 and became extinct following the death of the fourth baron in 1725.

All Saints Church, Hollingbourne, Kent, contains numerous monuments and memorials to the Culpeper family, owners of Leeds Castle and Hollingbourne Manor. These include the first, third and fourth Barons Colepeper: John Colpeper (d. 1660), John Colepeper (d. 1719) and Cheny Colepeper (d. 1725). The memorials for the third and fourth barons are by John Michael Rysbrack.

== Barons Colepeper (1644) ==
- John Colepeper, 1st Baron Colepeper (died 11 June 1660)
- Thomas Colepeper, 2nd Baron Colepeper (1635–1689)
- John Colepeper, 3rd Baron Colepeper (1640-1719)
- Cheney Colepeper, 4th Baron Colepeper (1642-1725)

== North American history ==
The title was held by several members of the Colepeper family who controlled land in the North American Colony of Virginia, in particular the Northern Neck. In the context of Colonial history in North America, the family is often recorded as Culpeper. Culpeper County, Virginia is named for colonial governor of Virginia Thomas Colepeper, 2nd Baron Colepeper; his only surviving daughter, Catherine Culpeper; or another close relative.

== See also ==
- Culpeper baronets
