= Heneage Finch, 2nd Earl of Aylesford =

English politician, courtier and peer (1683–1757)

The Right Honourable The Earl of Aylesford
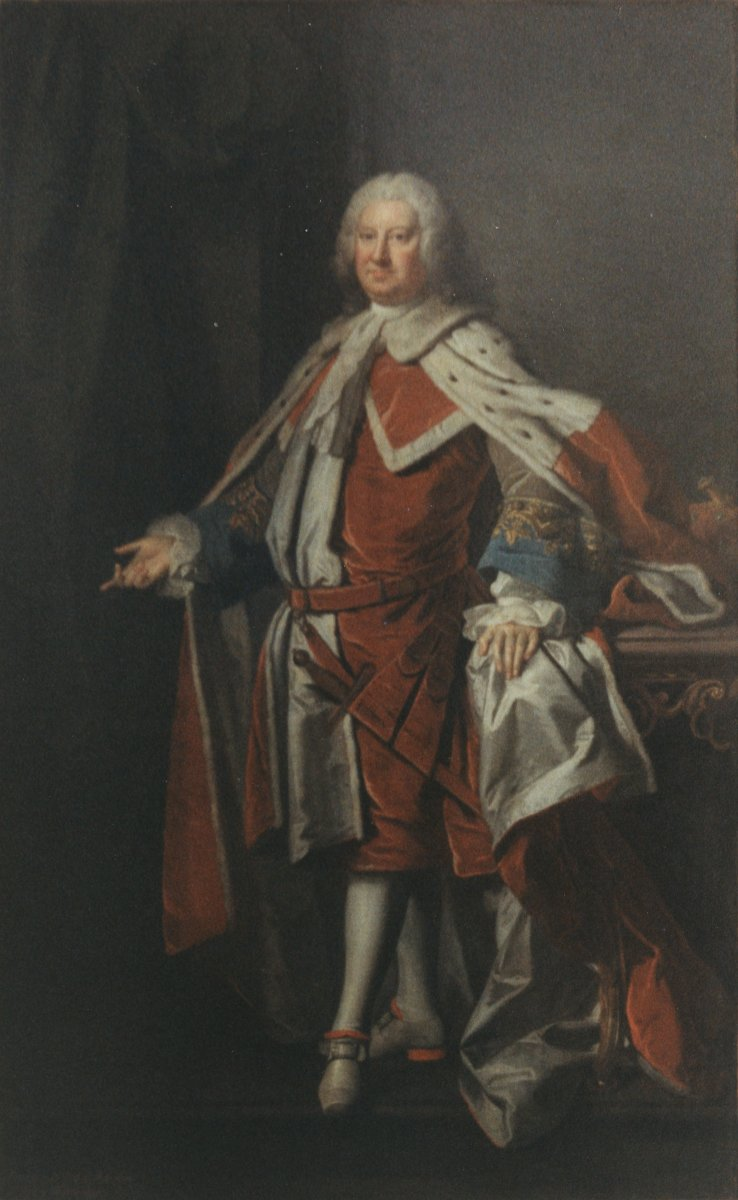
- Born: c. 1683; Albury, Surrey
- Died: 29 June 1757; England
- Education: Christ Church, Oxford
- Occupations: Politician, courtier
- Spouse: Mary Fisher
- Children: At least 4, including Heneage

Aylesford's coat of arms

Heneage Finch, 2nd Earl of Aylesford (c. 1683 – 29 June 1757), styled Lord Guernsey from 1714 to 1719, was an English politician, courtier and peer who sat in the English and British House of Commons from 1704 to 1719, representing the constituencies of Maidstone and Surrey. Born in Albury, Surrey into an aristocratic family, he also served as the Master of the Jewel Office from 1711 to 1716.

== Origins ==
Heneage was born about 1683 at Albury, Surrey. He was the son and heir of Heneage Finch, 1st Earl of Aylesford (died 1719).

== Career ==
From 1704 to 1705, he represented Maidstone in the British House of Commons, and was knight of the shire for Surrey from 1710 to 1719. He was the Master of the Jewel Office from 1711 to 1716.

== Marriage and children ==
Arms of Fisher of Great Packington, Warwickshire: Argent, a chevron vair between three demi-lions rampant gules

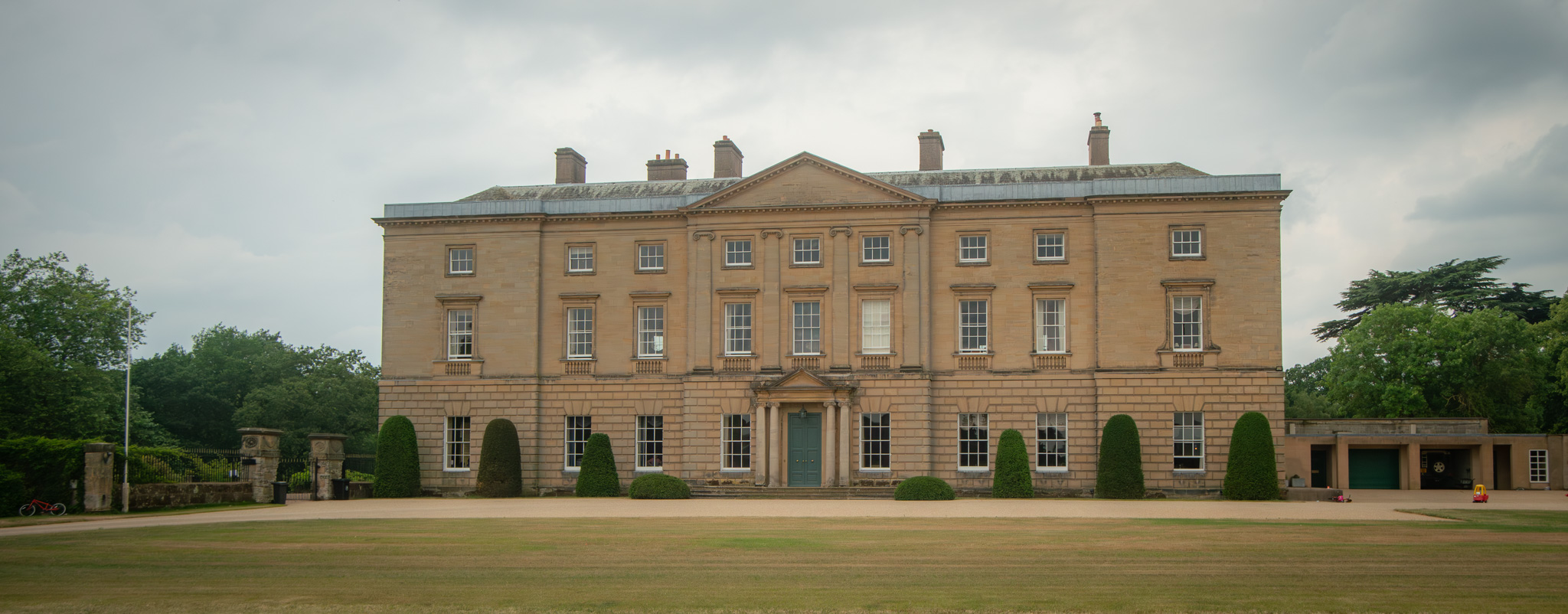
Packington Hall, Warwickshire (seat of Earl of Aylesford.

He married Mary Fisher (1690 – 28 May 1740) on 9 December 1712 at Great Packington. Mary was the daughter and sole heiress of Sir Clement Fisher, 3rd Baronet (died 1729) of Packington Hall, Great Packington, Warwickshire, by his wife Ann Jennens. They had children including:

- Heneage Finch, 3rd Earl of Aylesford (6 November 1715 - 9 September 1777), eldest son and heir.
- Mary (1717-16 March 1803) married William Howard, Viscount Andover. They had one son and three daughters.
- Elizabeth (1719 - 19 December 1793)
- Frances (4 February 1721 - 19 December 1761), married in 1741 William Courtenay, de jure 7th Earl of Devon, 1st Viscount Courtenay (1710–1762) of Powderham Castle, Devon.

== Sources ==
- Dictionary of National Biography, Finch, Heneage, first Earl of Aylesford (1647?–1719), by E. T. Bradley. Published 1889.

Parliament of England
Vacant Title last held by Sir Robert Marsham; Sir Thomas Roberts	Member of Parliament for Maidstone; 1704–1705; With: Thomas Bliss	Succeeded by Thomas Bliss; Sir Thomas Culpeper
Parliament of Great Britain
Preceded by Sir Richard Onslow; Sir William Scawen	Member of Parliament for Surrey; 1710–1719; With: Sir Francis Vincent 1710–1713; Sir Richard Onslow 1713–1715; Thomas Onslow 1715–1717; Denzil Onslow 1717–1719	Succeeded by Denzil Onslow; John Walter
Court offices
Preceded by John Charlton	Master of the Jewel Office; 1711–1716	Succeeded by James Brudenell
Peerage of Great Britain
Preceded by Heneage Finch	Earl of Aylesford; 1719–1757	Succeeded by Heneage Finch
