= Thomas Colepeper, 2nd Baron Colepeper =

English colonial administrator (1635-1689)

The Right Honourable The Lord Colepeper
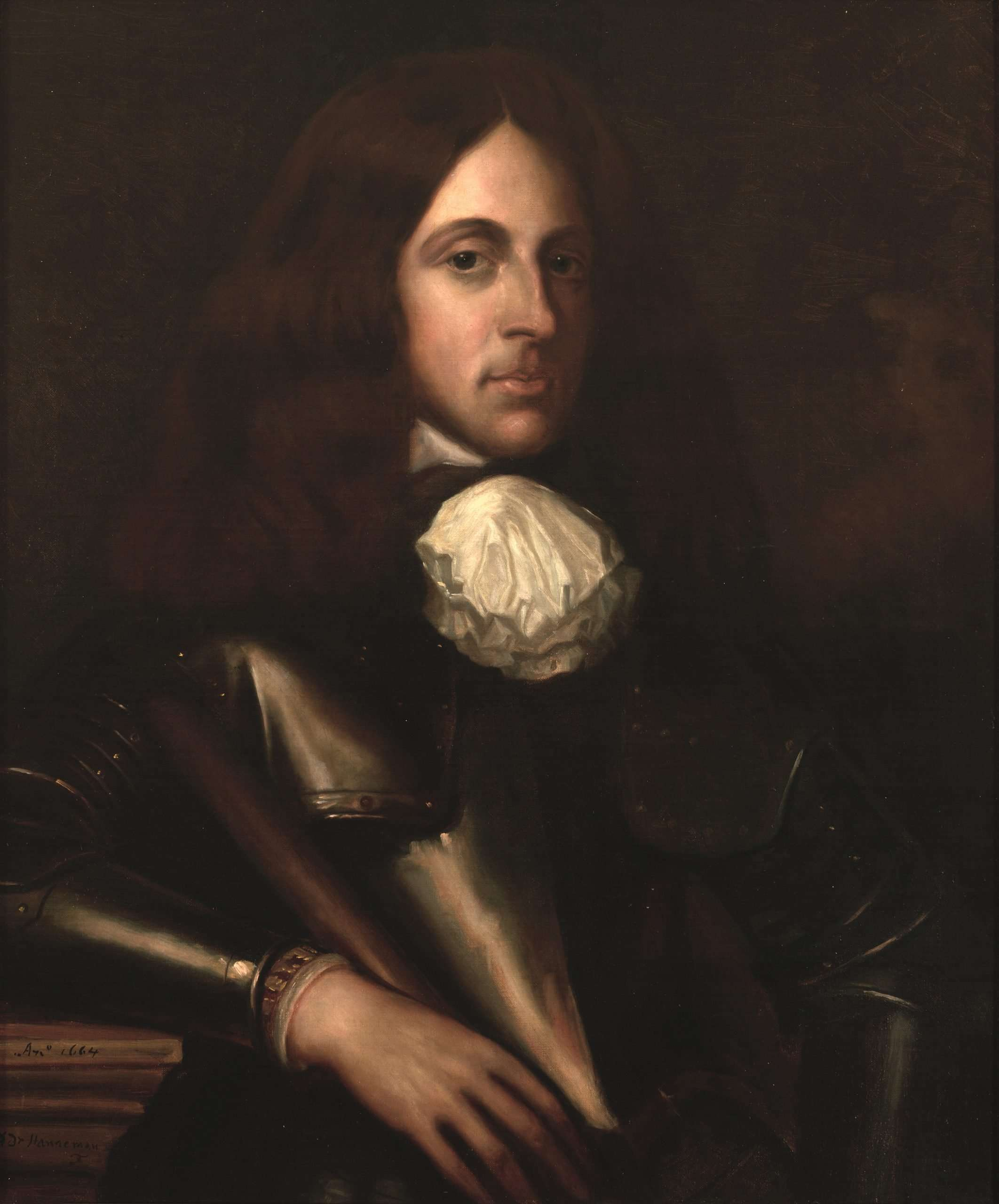
- 1901 portrait

Governor of Virginia
- In office 1677–1683
- Monarch: Charles II
- Preceded by: Sir William Berkeley
- Succeeded by: The Lord Howard of Effingham

Personal details
- Born: 21 March 1635 England
- Died: 27 January 1689 (aged 53) London, England

Thomas Colepeper, 2nd Baron Colepeper (21 March 1635 – 27 January 1689) was an English colonial administrator who served as the governor of the Isle of Wight from 1661 to 1667 and as the governor of Virginia from 1677 to 1683.

== Life ==
Coat of Arms of Thomas Colepeper

Restoratation of Lord Colepeper Act 1660
- Act of Parliament
- Parliament of England
- Long title: An Act for restoring to Thomas Lord Culpeper, Son and Heir and Sole Executor of John Lord Culpeper, Baron of Thorswey, and Master of the Rolls, deceased, all the Honours, Manors, Lands, and Tenements, Leases not determined, and Hereditaments whatsoever, whereof the said John Lord Culpeper was in Possession on the 20th Day of May, 1642, or at any Time after, which have not been since sold or aliened by the said John late Lord Culpeper, by Acts or Assurances to which himself was Party and consenting.
- Citation: 12 Cha. 2. c. 9

Dates
- Royal assent: 13 September 1660

Born in 1635, Thomas was the son of Judith and John Colepeper. As a royalist, his father left England following the execution of Charles I at the end of the English Civil War. Thomas lived with his father in the Netherlands where he married the Dutch heiress Margaret van Hesse on 3 August 1659. He returned to England after Charles II's restoration, where his wife was naturalised as English by Act of Parliament.

Colepeper was made governor of the Isle of Wight from 1661 to 1667, which involved little administration but added to his wealth. He was elected as a bailiff to the board of the Bedford Level Corporation for 1665 and 1667.

He became the governor of Virginia in July 1677 but did not leave England until 1679, when he was ordered to do so by Charles II. While in Virginia, he seemed more interested in maintaining his land in the Northern Neck than governing, so he soon returned to England. Rioting in the colony forced him to return in 1682, by which time the riots were already quelled. After apparently appropriating £9,500 from the treasury of the colony, he again returned to England. Charles II was forced to dismiss him, appointing in his stead Francis Howard, Baron of Effingham. During this tumultuous time, Colepeper's erratic behaviour meant that he had to rely increasingly on his cousin and Virginia agent, Col. Nicholas Spencer. (Spencer had succeeded Colepeper as acting governor upon the lord's departures from the colony.)

Colepeper lived the rest of his life in London with his mistress Susannah Willis and their two daughters. He left a will in favour of Willis and her daughters that was suppressed. Catherine Colepeper, his only child with his wife Margaret van Hesse, instead inherited much of his wealth and married Thomas Fairfax, lord of Cameron, in 1690. His daughter Roberta Anne Colepeper married the bigamist Thomas Porter (dramatist)

In Virginia, Culpeper County and its county seat Culpeper are named after him. Darwin Island, the most northerly of the Galapagos Islands in Ecuador, was named Lord Culpepper's Island in his honour by the pirate William Ambrosia Cowley in 1684 and the name Culpepper Island was maintained for centuries thereafter.

Government offices
Preceded by Sir William Berkeley	Colonial Governor of Virginia; 1677–1683	Succeeded by Lord Howard of Effingham
Honorary titles
Preceded by Earl of Portland	Governor of the Isle of Wight; 1661–1667	Succeeded by Sir Robert Holmes
Preceded by Earl of Portland	Vice-Admiral of Hampshire; 1662–1669	Succeeded by Sir Robert Holmes
Peerage of England
Preceded by John Colepeper	Baron Colepeper; 1660–1689	Succeeded by John Colepeper
