= Culpeper baronets =

Extinct baronetcy in the Baronetage of England

There have been two baronetcies created in the Baronetage of England for members of the Colepeper family (also known as Colpeper, Culpeper or Colepepper) of Kent and Sussex. Both are extinct.

The baronets descended from the Colepeper of Bayhall, Pembury, Kent and from Sir Thomas Colepeper Castellan of Leeds Castle who died in 1321.

The Baronetcy of Colepeper of Preston Hall, Kent was created on 17 May 1627 for William Colepeper of Preston Hall, Aylesford, Kent. He served as High Sheriff of Kent in 1637. His grandson, the third Baronet, served as High Sheriff in 1704 and was Member of Parliament for Maidstone 1705–1713 and 1715–1723. The baronetcy was extinct on his death. The Kent estates passed to his sister and via her second marriage to the Milner family.

The Baronetcy of Colepeper of Wakehurst, Sussex was created on 20 September 1628 for William Colepeper, of Wakehurst, a descendant of the senior line of the Bayhill family. He was High Sheriff of Surrey and Sussex in 1634 and represented East Grinstead in the Parliament of 1640. He was succeeded in turn by two sons and his great-grandson. The baronetcy was extinct on the latter's death.

John Colepeper of Thoresby, Lincolnshire, a representative of a junior branch of the Bayhill family, was raised to the peerage in 1644 as Baron Colepeper.

== Colepeper baronets, of Preston Hall (1627) ==
- Sir William Colepeper, 1st Baronet of Preston Hall (1588–1651)
- Sir Richard Colepeper, 2nd Baronet (died 1660)
- Sir Thomas Colepeper, 3rd Baronet (1656–1723)

== Colepeper baronets, of Wakehurst, Sussex (1628) ==
- Sir William Colepeper, 1st Baronet of Wakehurst (died 1651)
- Sir Benjamin Colepeper, 2nd Baronet (died 1670)
- Sir Edward Colepeper, 3rd Baronet (1632–1700)
- Sir William Colepeper, 4th Baronet (1668–1740)
