= Sir Thomas Culpeper, 3rd Baronet =

English landowner and Whig politician

Sir Thomas Culpeper, 3rd Baronet, also known as Colepeper, (c. 1656 – 18 May 1723) of Preston Hall, Aylesford, Kent was an English landowner and Whig politician who sat in the English and British House of Commons between 1705 and 1723.

== Early life ==
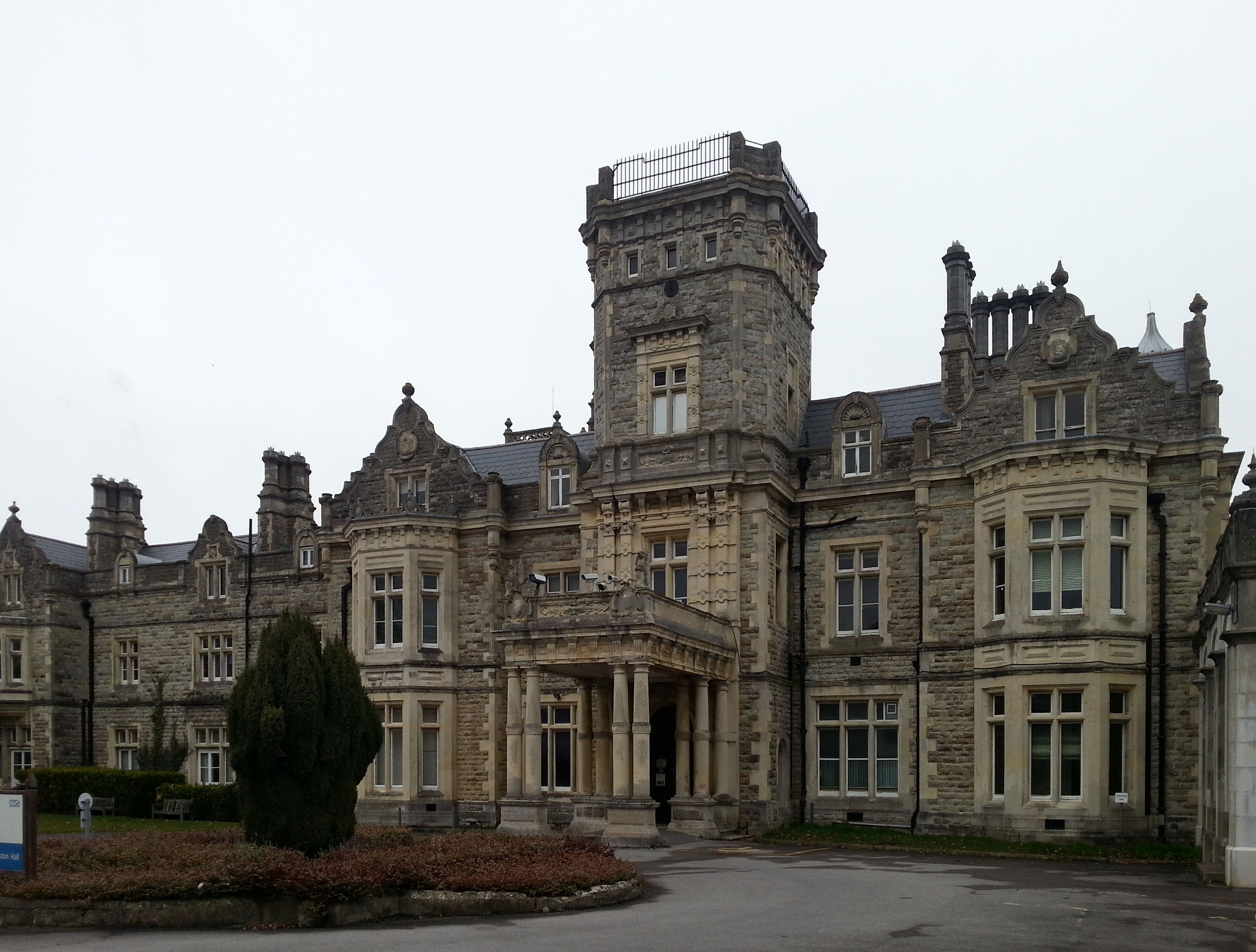
Preston Hall, Kent

Culpeper was the son of Sir Richard Culpeper, 2nd Baronet of Preston Hall, and his wife Margaret Reynolds. He inherited the baronetcy and Preston Hall in infancy on the death of his father on 10 January 1660. He matriculated at Magdalen Hall, Oxford on 15 June 1672 aged 15. He took as his mistress Lady Elizabeth Wythens, the wife of Sir Francis Wythens, of Southend, Eltham, Kent which led to great acrimony. In 1693 Lady Wythens tried to have her husband incarcerated in a debtors' prison. In November 1696 Wythens raised a charge of assault against Culpeper and Sir Thomas Taylor, 2nd Baronet, Lady Wythens' brother, but failed to gain a conviction when several worthies testified to Culpeper's 'great worth and honour'. After Wythens' death on 9 May 1704, Culpeper married his widow on 23 August 1704, but it was reported that he never lived with her as a husband.

== Career ==
Culpeper was High Sheriff of Kent in 1704. At the 1705 English general election he was returned as a Whig member of parliament (MP) for Maidstone, Kent. He voted for the Court candidate for Speaker on 25 October 1705, but, probably in support of the Country Whigs, he voted against the Court on the 'place clause' of the regency bill, on 18 February 1706. He was returned as a Whig again at the 1708 British general election and he voted for the naturalization of the Palatines in 1709 and for the impeachment of Dr Sacheverell in 1710. At the 1710 British general election, he topped the poll, but is not recorded in any divisions in that Parliament. He decided not to stand at the 1713 British general election.

At the 1715 British general election, Culpeper was returned again as MP for Maidstone. He voted for the septennial bill in 1716, and against the Peerage Bill. He was returned again at the 1722 British general election.

== Death and legacy ==
Culpeper died without issue on 18 May 1723 at the age of 66 and the baronetcy became extinct. His estates passed to his sister Alicia's son, Sir Thomas Taylor, 3rd Baronet. He also left 500 guineas to Lady Catharine Twisden, born Wythens, who may have been Culpeper's natural daughter, and 100 guineas to mistress Swayne, 'her woman', for faithful service.

Parliament of England
Preceded by Heneage Finch; Thomas Bliss	Member of Parliament for Maidstone; 1705–1707; With: Thomas Bliss	Succeeded by Parliament of Great Britain
Parliament of Great Britain
Preceded by Parliament of England	Member of Parliament for Maidstone; 1707–1713; With: Thomas Bliss	Succeeded by Samuel Ongley; Sir Robert Marsham, Bt
Preceded by Samuel Ongley; Sir Robert Marsham, Bt	Member of Parliament for Maidstone; 1715–1723; With: Sir Robert Marsham, Bt; Barnham Rider; John Finch	Succeeded by Barnham Rider; John Finch
Baronetage of England
Preceded by Richard Culpeper	Baronet (of Preston Hall); 1660-1723	Extinct
