= John Colepeper, 1st Baron Colepeper =

English military officer and politician

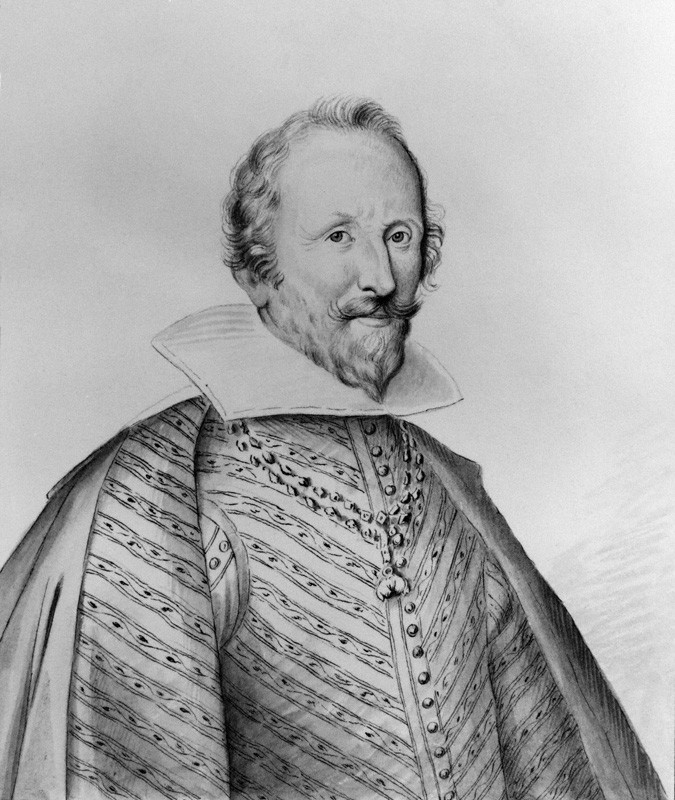

Baron Colepeper
- In office 1644–1660

Chancellor of the Exchequer
- In office 1642–1643

Member of the English Parliament for Kent
- In office 1640–1644

Personal details
- Born: c. 1600
- Died: 11 July 1660
- Spouse(s): Philippa Snelling; Judith Culpeper
- Children: 11, including Thomas
- Parent: Thomas Colepeper (father)

John Colepeper, 1st Baron Culpeper (c. 1600 – 11 July 1660) was an English military officer and politician who, as Chancellor of the Exchequer (1642–43) and Master of the Rolls (1643) was an influential counsellor of King Charles I during the English Civil War, who rewarded him with a peerage and some landholdings in Virginia. During the Commonwealth he lived abroad in Europe, where he continued to act as a servant, advisor and supporter of King Charles II in exile. Having taken part in the Prince's escape into exile in 1646, Colepeper accompanied Charles in his triumphant return to England in May 1660, but died only two months later. Although descended from Colepepers of Bedgebury, Sir John was of a distinct cadet branch settled at Wigsell in the parish of Salehurst.

== Colepeper of Wigsell ==
The Colepeper family resided in Kent and Sussex during the later Middle Ages, and certain of them served in administrative capacities (particularly as High Sheriffs of Kent and in the stewardship of Romney Marsh) from as early as the reign of King Edward III (1322-1377). Branches of the family settled at various locations. John Colepeper derived from the branch which settled at the manor of Wigsell in the parish of Salehurst, East Sussex. Sir John Colepeper of Bedgebury, in Goudhurst in the county of Kent, had by his wife Agnes two sons, the elder of whom, Alexander, established the Colepepers of Bedgebury, and the younger, Walter, took the ancient Colepeper inheritance of Wigsell as his portion.

Walter Colepeper married Anne (daughter and heir of Harry Aucher of Lossenham, a manor in Newenden, Kent), and at the time of his death in 1514 was Under-Marshal of Calais. Their eldest son William Colepeper married Cicely Barrett in 1530, when the Wigsell estate was settled on William's mother for life, with remainder to William and Anne. William's eldest son was John, born 1530: he married Elizabeth Sidley of Southfleet, Kent around 1560, and was buried at Salehurst in 1612 aged 82.

== Birth and young life ==
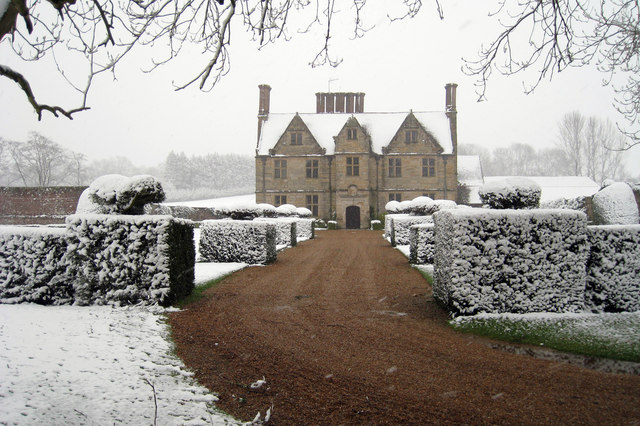
Great Wigsell manor house, rebuilt after it was sold by John Colepeper in 1623

The eldest son of John and Elizabeth was Thomas Colepeper (1561-1613), who first married Anne Slaney. Anne was a daughter of Sir Stephen Slaney, citizen and Skinner, Alderman of London 1584-1608 and Lord Mayor of London 1595-96, who died in 1608, and his wife Margaret Fesaunt (died 1619). Thomas and Anne were the natural parents of the future 1st Baron Colepeper of Thoresway. After the birth of two sons and a daughter, Anne died in 1601/02. Thomas Colepeper then remarried to Mary, daughter of Roger Beeston (citizen of London), and widow of Francis Gibbon of Benenden, Kent. By this second marriage there was a son Thomas who died in infancy in 1607, and three daughters.

The Wigsell inheritance at first should have descended to Thomas and Anne's elder son, Slaney Colepeper, but he died in 1617. It was then determined by his inquisition post mortem that it should pass to his younger brother John Colepeper, who in fact succeeded as the heir of Wigsell. Their full sister Elizabeth became the wife of Sir Robert Brooke of Yoxford, Suffolk in 1620: Brooke had formerly been married to the stepdaughter of John's aunt Mary Slaney, second wife of Sir Humphrey Weld (died 1610).

John's father, and his uncle John Colepeper of Feckenham (1563-1635), were member of the Virginia Company of London from 1609. John himself was a member from 1617 to 1623. He was knighted in 1621 and sold Wigsell to Cheney Culpeper in 1623. John's first marriage, to Philippa Snelling in 1628, lasted only until her death in 1630, leaving him a son and a daughter. His second marriage, to Judith Colepeper of Hollingbourne, Kent, a distant cousin, was in January 1630/31 and gave rise to a large family (see below).

== In Parliament, 1640-1644 ==
John Colepeper began his career in military service abroad, and came first into public notice at home through his knowledge of country affairs, being summoned often before the council board to give evidence on such matters. He was knighted, and after representing Rye in the Short Parliament in April 1640 was elected member later in the year for Kent in the Long Parliament. He then took the popular side, speaking against monopolies on 9 November 1640, being entrusted with the impeachment of Sir Robert Berkeley on 12 February 1641, supporting the attainder of Thomas Wentworth, 1st Earl of Strafford, and being appointed to the committee of defence on 12 August 1641.

He separated, however, from the popular party on the Church question, owing to political rather than religious objections, fearing the effect of the revolutionary changes which were now contemplated. He opposed the London petition for the abolition of episcopacy, the project of religious union with the Scots, and the Root and Branch Bill, and on 1 September he moved a resolution in defence of the prayer-book. In the following session he opposed the Militia Bill and the Grand Remonstrance, and finally on 2 January 1642 he joined the party of Charles I, taking office as Chancellor of the Exchequer in the same motion by which Lord Falkland was appointed Secretary of State, and both were sworn as Privy Councillors. In 1642, the subject along with Viscount Lucius Cary wrote the King's response to Parliament in regard to the military measure. Describing the growing power of corporations, he is reported to have said "they sip from our cup, they dip in our dish, they sit by our fire".

Colepeper highly disapproved of the king's attempt to arrest John Pym and four other members of the Long Parliament, which was made without his knowledge, but advocated the enterprise for the king's removal to Kingston-upon-Hull. On 25 August 1642 he appeared at the bar of the House of Commons to deliver the king's final proposals for peace: "There standing bareheaded, he looked so dejectedly as if he had been a delinquent rather than a member of the House, or privy counsellor, or messenger from His Majesty" He was afterwards present at the Battle of Edgehill, where he took part in Prince Rupert's charge and opposed the retreat of the king's forces from the battlefield.

In December he was made by Charles Master of the Rolls. He was a leading member of the Oxford Parliament, and was said, in opposition to the general opinion, to have counselled considerable concessions to secure peace. His influence in military affairs caused him to be much disliked by Prince Rupert and the army, and the general animosity against him was increased by his advancement to the peerage on 21 October 1644 by the title of Baron Colepeper of Thoresway in Lincolnshire.

== A royalist abroad, 1645-1660 ==
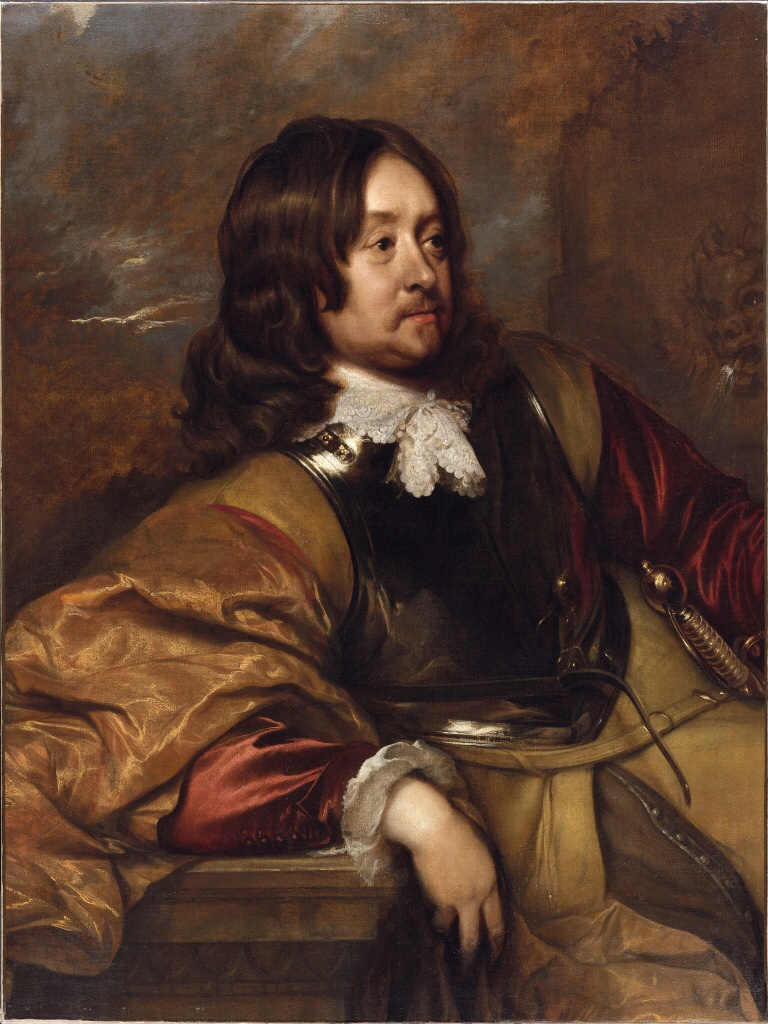
Edward Hyde, c. 1643

Lord Culpeper was despatched with Edward Hyde in charge of the Prince of Wales to the West in March 1645, and on 2 March 1646, after Charles's final defeat, embarked with the prince for Scilly (the Isles of Scilly in the county of Cornwall) and thence to France. He strongly advocated gaining the support of the Scots by granting them religious concessions, a policy supported by the queen and Mazarin, but opposed by Hyde and other leading royalists, and he constantly urged this course upon the king, while at the same time deprecating any yielding on the subject of the militia. He promoted the mission of Sir John Berkeley in 1647 to secure an understanding between Charles and the army.

In 1648 he accompanied the prince in his unsuccessful naval expedition, and returned with him to The Hague, where violent altercations broke out among the royalist leaders. Colepeper went so far, on one occasion in the council, as to challenge Prince Rupert, and was himself severely assaulted in the streets by Sir Robert Walsh. In the Charter of 1649, he was one-seventh proprietor of Virginia's Northern Neck, and his cousin Thomas Colepeper (1602-1660) (son of John Colepeper of Feckenham), who emigrated to Virginia and died there leaving four children who established themselves in America, held a further one-seventh in 1649.

Culpeper and others were named together with Charles and James Stuart, to be proscribed and banished as enemies and traitors to the Commonwealth, and his estates were confiscated to the uses of Parliament. After the execution of Charles I, he continued to press upon Charles II the acceptance of the Scottish proposals. He was sent to Russia in 1650, where he obtained a loan of 20,000 rubles from the Tsar: soon after his return, he was sent to the Netherlands to procure military assistance. Colepeper was obliged to leave France under the terms of the treaty agreed in August 1654 between Oliver Cromwell and Mazarin, and thenceforth he appears to have resided in Flanders. He accompanied Charles II to the south of France in September 1659, at the time of the Treaty of the Pyrenees.

== Death, monument, and appreciation ==
At the Restoration Colepeper returned to England, but he survived only for a few weeks, and died on 11 July 1660. His will, dated 3 July, was proved by his wife Judith, who was buried at Hollingbourne in 1691. His white marble wall monument, with a long inscription, was set up in Hollingbourne church by his son John, 3rd Baron Colepeper, and his daughter Elizabeth Hamilton, in 1695. The epitaph includes part of his Patent of Honour from King Charles I of 1644, given both in Latin and in English:

"Whereas our wellbeloved and most faithfull counsellor Iohn Culpeper Kt Mr of the Rolles of our Chancery of the Antient and Noble family of the Culpepers in our Counties of Kent and Sussex (many Ages past renowned for Persons of Eminent Ability both in War & Peace) hath given us signall testimonies of his apparent Loyalty Singular Manhood and profound judgement, Who in that never to be forgotten Battell of Keinton where both our owne and the publicke safety were manifestly at stake being then Chancellor of our Exchequer acquitted himself like a brave Man at Armes when at Newbery and in other occasions alwayes enobled his gowne with Martiall Atchievements, latterly who in our most perillous junctures by his seasonable and wise counsells hath been a principall support of our Crowne & Dignity &c."

Several contemporary writers agree in testifying to Colepeper's great debating powers and to his resources as an adviser, but complain of his want of stability and of his uncertain temper. The Earl of Clarendon, with whom he was often on ill terms, speaks generally in his praise, and repels the charge of corruption levelled against him. His political foresight is shown by a remarkable letter written on 20 September 1658 on the death of Cromwell, in which he foretells with uncommon sagacity the future developments in the political situation, advises the royalists to remain inactive till the right moment and profit by the division of their opponents, and distinguishes George Monck as the one person willing and capable of effecting the Restoration.

== Family ==
Lord Colepeper was twice married.

His first wife was Philippa, daughter of Sir John Snelling of West Grinstead, Sussex, whom he married on 29 October 1628 at St Botolph-without-Bishopsgate. She was buried at Hollingbourne, Kent, on 16 September 1630: by her, he had one son and one daughter:

- Alexander Colepeper, married Katherine, daughter of Sir Edward Ford of Harting, Sussex. He died without issue. Administration of his estate was granted in 1660 to his widow, who remarried to Ralph Grey, Esq.
- Philippa Colepeper (died before September 1652), married Sir Thomas Harlackenden of Woodchurch, Kent, to whom she brought two sons and two daughters.

His second wife was his cousin Judith Culpeper (married 12 January 1630/31), daughter of Sir Thomas Colepeper of Hollingbourne Manor. (Sir John had sold Wigsell to Judith's brother Cheney Culpeper (1601-1663) in 1623. Sir Thomas purchased Leeds Castle in Kent in 1634.) They had several children, all of whom were baptized at Hollingbourne, Kent:

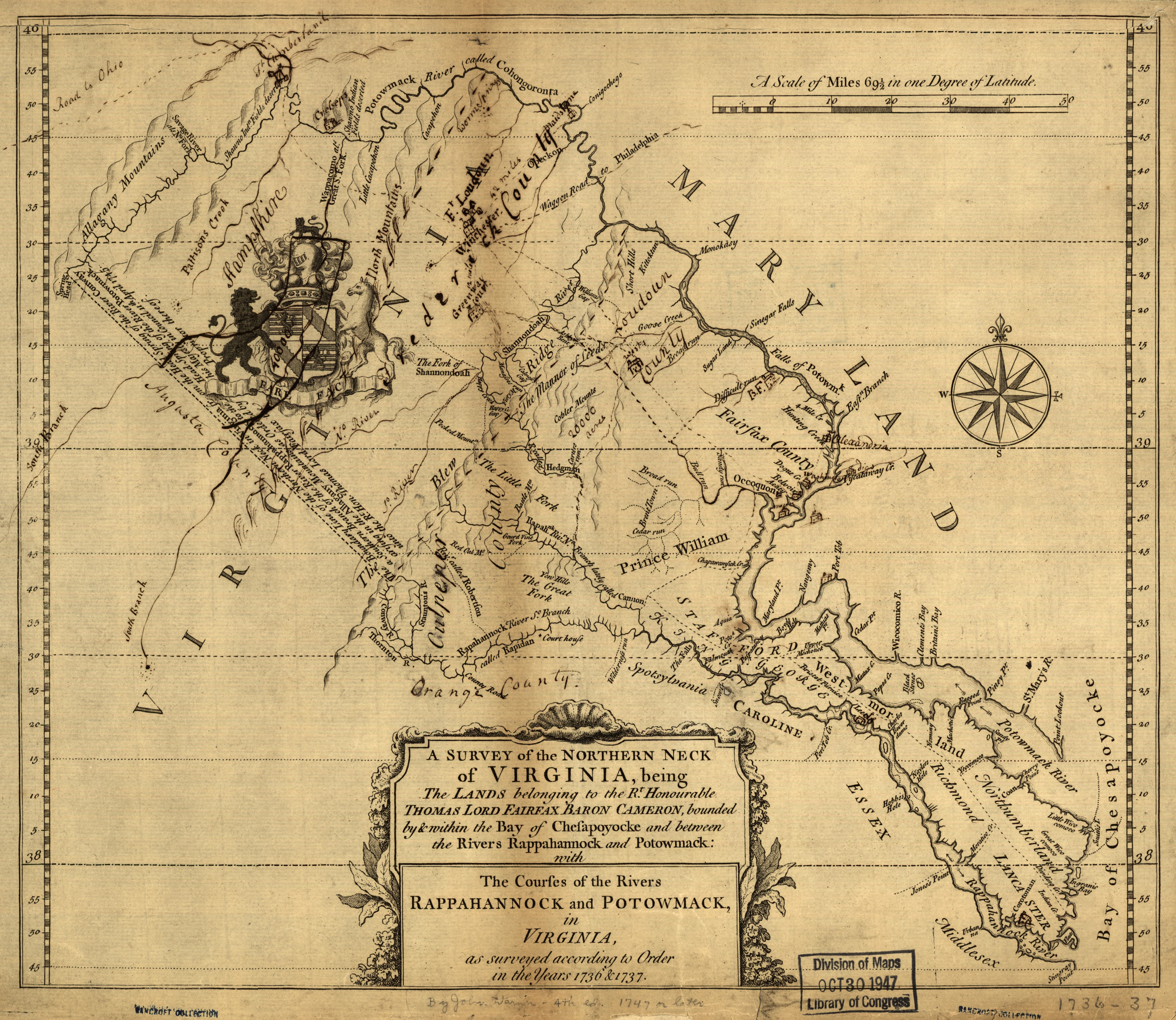
The Northern Neck, Virginia, as it descended to Lord Fairfax, showing Culpeper County in the south-western side

- Elizabeth Colepeper, baptized and buried in 1632.
- Thomas Colepeper, baptized in 1633, buried in 1634.
- Thomas Colepeper, baptized 1635, died 1689, 2nd Baron Colepeper of Thoresway, succeeded in title in 1660. He married Margaret, daughter and coheir of Johan van Hesse, Heer van Perschill en Wena, (by which he became brother-in-law to the royalist Sir John Sayer of Whitehall.) He was Crown Governor of Virginia from 1680 to 1683. His wife survived him: they had one daughter Catherine, who married Thomas Fairfax, 5th Lord Fairfax of Cameron. He also had a mistress Susanna Willis by whom he had two daughters, namely Susan (wife of Sir Charles Englefield) and Charlotte.
- Elizabeth Colepeper, baptized 1637, in 1661 married James Hamilton, Groom of the Bedchamber to King Charles II; they were the parents of James Hamilton, who became 6th Earl of Abercorn. She was living in 1695 when she and her brother John set up the memorial to their father. She was buried in February 1709/10 at Hollingbourne.
- Judith Colepeper, baptized in 1638, died in 1691.
- John Colepeper, baptized 1640, died 1719, 3rd Baron Colepeper of Thoresway, succeeded to the title in 1689. He married Frances, daughter of Sir Thomas Colepeper of Hollingbourne by Alice, daughter of Sir William Colepeper of Aylesford, and died without issue.
- Cheney Colepeper, baptized 1642, died 1725, 4th Baron Colepeper of Thoresway, succeeded to the title in 1719: he never married, and the title became extinct with his death.
- Francis Colepeper, died without issue.
- Philippa Colepeper, baptized 1649, died 1719.

Political offices
Preceded by Sir Francis Cottington	Chancellor of the Exchequer; 1642–1643	Succeeded by Edward Hyde
Parliament of England
Preceded by Sir Norton Knatchbull, Bt; Sir Roger Twysden, Bt	Member of Parliament for Kent; 1640–1644; With: Sir Edward Dering, Bt 1640–1642; Augustine Skinner 1642–1644	Succeeded by Augustine Skinner
Peerage of England
New creation	Baron Colepeper; 1644–1660	Succeeded by Thomas Colepeper
