= Brush Turbogenerators =

Group of international manufacturing companies

Brush Turbogenerators owned by Melrose Industries, is a group of international manufacturing companies under the BRUSH brand. It consists of Brush Electrical Machines Limited based in Loughborough, UK, Brush HMA based in Ridderkerk, The Netherlands and Brush SEM based in Plzeň in the Czech Republic. BRUSH Turbogenerators manufacture large generators for gas turbine and steam turbine drive applications. The company was founded by Charles Francis Brush, who was born in Cleveland, Ohio, USA in 1849 and who had invented his first electric dynamo in 1876. Melrose Industries completed the acquisition with FKI in 2008.

Staffs at Brush Turbogenerators have returned to their factory facing redundancy in February 2018. The company employs 790 employees in the UK with around 500 in Loughborough, but there has been a significant drop in sales of power generators due to the renewable energy growth.

== History ==
In 1881 The Brush Electric Light Company was founded to commercialize Charles F. Brush's electric lighting system.

== See also ==
- Charles F. Brush
- Electrical engineering
