= Brush Transformers =

British power transformer manufacturer

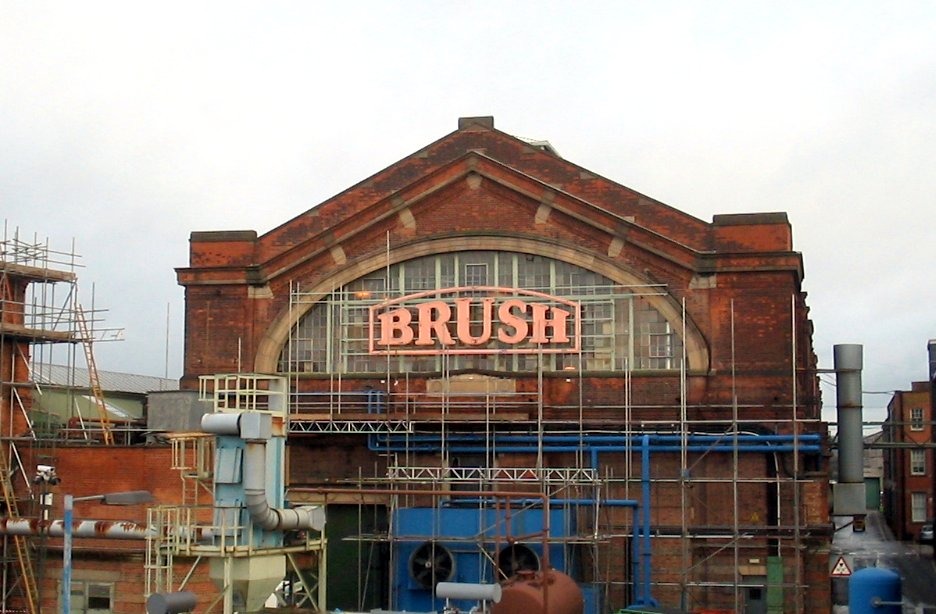
- Brush Transformers works in Loughborough
- Company type: Subsidiary
- Industry: Electrical industry
- Predecessor: Anglo-American Brush Electric Light Corporation
- Founded: 1876; 150 years ago in London
- Founder: Charles Francis Brush
- Headquarters: Loughborough, United Kingdom
- Area served: United Kingdom, and Europe
- Products: Electrical switchgear, transformers, engineering
- Owner: Greenbelt Capital Partners
- Number of employees: 140 (2026)
- Website: www.brush.eu

Brush Transformers is a British company based in Loughborough, Leicestershire. They are a manufacturer of power transformers with a history stretching back over 140 years. The company was purchased by Melrose plc in 2008 and sold to Greenbelt Capital partners (formerly the energy arm of Trilantic North America, and prior to that Lehman Brothers Merchant Banking) 2025.

== History ==
Charles Francis Brush gained respect for his pioneering work in electrical generation, lighting and motors as well as transformers. In 1888, the London based Anglo-American Brush Electric Light Corporation acquired the Falcon Engine and Car Works, with their established skills of electrical engineering and transport engineering, moved 100 miles north into the newly acquired Falcon Works at Loughborough, where, as of 2018, Brush Transformers Ltd still operates.

By 1957 the Brush Group was acquired by Hawker Siddeley and new investments were made. Eventually, the various divisions of Brush Electrical Engineering Company Limited became independent of one another based on their distinctive and individual product ranges, and Brush Transformers Limited came to fruition in 1971.

The Hawker Siddeley Group was acquired by BTR plc in November 1991, and in November 1996 its Electric Power Group was sold to FKI, who formed a dedicated Transformers Division. On 1 July 2008, Melrose plc completed the acquisition with FKI, Melrose being a specialist investor in the manufacturing industry, Melrose is registered on the London Stock Exchange.

== See also ==
- Brush Electrical Machines
- Brush Traction
