= Brush Electrical Machines =

UK manufacturer of electrical generators

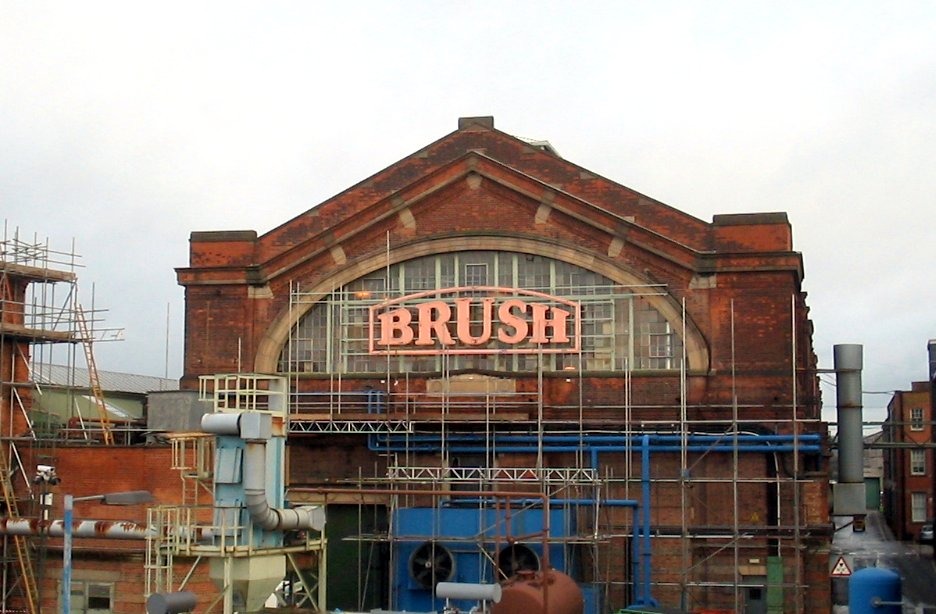
Brush Electrical Machines works in Loughborough, UK.

Brush Electrical Machines is a manufacturer of electrical generators typically for gas turbine and steam turbine driven applications. The main office is based at Loughborough in Leicestershire, UK.

== History ==
Charles Francis Brush, born in Cleveland, Ohio in 1849, founded the Brush Electric Light Company, which stayed in business in the U.S. until 1889 when it was sold to the Thomson-Houston Company making Brush a wealthy man.

In 1880, the Anglo-American Brush Electric Light Corporation was established in Lambeth, London. Its formation was to exploit the invention of Brush's first electric dynamo in 1876.

As the business grew, due to the demand for new electrical apparatus, larger premises were sought, and in 1889 the corporation moved 100 miles north into the newly acquired Falcon Engine and Car Works at Loughborough under the new name, Brush Electrical Engineering Company Limited.

=== Pioneer electricity supply: 1886 to 1897 ===
From the late 1880s, under chief engineer John Smith Raworth and chief electrician William Morris Mordey, the Brush Electrical Engineering Company became the dominant supplier of AC electricity generation equipment in Britain's pioneer electricity age. Mordey introduced the Mordey Victoria alternator, which became the standard AC generator of the period, operating at 2,000 volts, 100 Hz, single phase with step-down transformers for domestic distribution.

The Mordey Victoria alternator was installed at more than thirteen power stations across Britain including the Bankside Power Station of the City of London Electric Lighting Company, which provided the first public AC electricity supply in London in 1891, on the site now occupied by Tate Modern, as well as stations at Pandon Dene, Newcastle; Lynmouth, Devon; Bath; Huddersfield; Woking; Dover; Wandsworth; Chagford; Bournemouth; Hanley and Leicester.

Mordey and Raworth co-developed the six-principle system for the parallel operation of alternators, which Mordey described in his 1893 IEE paper as having been settled between them years earlier and acted on "practically without change" across every Brush installation. This system formed the operational framework for how public electricity supply networks were operated and was a foundational contribution to the development of the modern electricity grid.

Raworth designed a special type of high speed engine specifically for use with the Mordey alternator, universally known as the Raworth engine, which became the standard prime mover across every Brush power station installation.

In 1914, the company began manufacturing Ljungstrom steam turbines under licence.

Over the next sixty years, the business grew by acquisitions, until in 1957, the Brush companies were incorporated into the Hawker Siddeley Group. Within the group, the company manufactured a vast range of electrical products, including turbo generators, salient pole machines, induction motors, traction motors and generators, traction locomotives, switchgear, transformers and fuses.

In November 1991 Hawker Siddeley Electric Power Group was subject to a successful hostile takeover bid of £1.5 billion from BTR plc, a large engineering conglomerate. In November 1996 the FKI Group of Companies acquired the Hawker Siddeley Electric Power Group from BTR for a price of £182 million. On 1 July 2008 Melrose plc, a specialist investor in the manufacturing industry, bought FKI.

During the last 125 years, various Brush companies (Brush Switchgear, Brush Transformers, Brush Traction and Brush Control Gear) have existed on the Falcon Works site, but throughout this period Brush Electrical Machines Ltd manufacturing generators and motors has always been the largest company. Over 5,000 staff were employed on the site during the 1960s and 70s.

The following products are manufactured by Brush:

- Air-cooled turbo generators in the range of 20 to 300MVA
- Turbomotors from 10 to 100MW
- Associated control equipment

In 2022, Brush Electrical Machines became a part of Baker Hughes.

== Aircraft manufacture ==
In 1915, Brush Electrical was one of a number of companies outside the established aviation contractors selected by the Royal Navy to receive orders for aircraft to meet the expanding needs of the Royal Naval Air Service. Brush completed 650 aircraft by the end of 1919, including 400 Avro 504s and 142 Short Type 184s. It also built de Havilland Dragon Rapides during the Second World War, taking over production from de Havilland in 1943 and building 346 aircraft (47.5% of the total number produced) by the time production ended in 1945.

== See also ==
- Brush Traction
- Brush Transformers
- Associated British Oil Engine Company
