= 1975 Special Honours =

British government recognitions

As part of the British honours system, Special Honours are issued at the Monarch's pleasure at any given time. The Special Honours refer to the awards made within royal prerogative, operational honours and other honours awarded outside the New Years Honours and Birthday Honours.

== Life peer ==
=== Baronesses ===
- Miss Lucy Faithfull, O.B.E., Director of Social Services, City of Oxford 1970-74.

=== Barons ===
- Sir Raymond Percival Brookes, President, Guest, Keen and Nettlefolds Ltd.
- The Right Honourable Leonard Robert Carr, M.P., Member of Parliament for Mitcham 1950-74 and for Sutton/Carshalton since 1974. Secretary of State for Employment 1970-72. Lord President of the Council, 1972. Secretary of State for the Home Department 1972-74.
- William Donald Chapman, Chairman, H.M. Development Commissioners. Chairman, Telford New Town Corporation. Member of Parliament for the Northfield Division of Birmingham 1951-70.
- Thomas Edward Neil Driberg, Member of Parliament for the Maldon Division of Essex 1942-55, and for Barking 1959-74.
- William Edward John McCarthy, University Lecturer in Industrial Relations, Oxford. Fellow of Nuffield College, Oxford.
- Albert Edward Oram, Administrative Officer, Intermediate Technology Development Group Ltd. Member of Parliament for East Ham South 1955-74.
- Gordon Samuel David Parry, Warden, Pembrokeshire Teachers' Centre. Member, Neyland Urban District Council 1948-75.
- Michael Platt Winstanley, Member of Parliament for Cheadle 1966-70 and for Hazelgrove 1974.
