= Simon Antony =

Simon Antony may refer to:

- Simon Bird, full name Simon Antony Bird (born 1984), English actor and comedian
- Simon Daniels (cricketer), full name Simon Antony Brewis Daniels (born 1958), English former cricketer
- Simon Henig, full name Simon Antony Henig (born 1969), English politician
- Simon Peckham, full name Simon Antony Peckham (born 1962), English businessperson
- Simon Wigg, full name Simon Antony Wigg (1960–2000), English speedway rider
