= FKI (company) =

Former British manufacturing company

- Company type: Private
- Industry: Engineering
- Founded: 1920
- Headquarters: Loughborough, UK
- Owner: Melrose

FKI is a British engineering and manufacturing company headquartered in Loughborough, Leicestershire. For many years listed on the London Stock Exchange and a constituent of the FTSE 250 Index, it was taken private by buyout firm Melrose in July 2008.

== History ==
The company was founded in 1920 as a manufacturer of parking meters, trading as Fisher Limited. The name was subsequently changed to Fisher Karpark Industries ('FKI'). In 1987 it merged with Babcock International to form FKI Babcock but then demerged the heavy engineering parts of Babcock again in 1989. The company was taken private by buyout firm Melrose in July 2008 in a deal worth over £500 million.

== Organisation and subsidiaries ==
FKI plc has a large number of subsidiaries, which it divides into four groups:

- Energy Technology - Electrical generation apparatus
- Lifting Products and Services - Lifting apparatus (wire ropes, hooks etc.). The waste recycling businesses operated by FKI (recycling machinery) are also incorporated into this section.
- Hardware - Domestic fittings - door handles, hinges etc. as well as office fittings.
- FKI Logistex - Product handling automation - conveyor belts, RFID implementation, baggage handling automation etc.

=== Energy technology ===
The Brush group of companies are incorporated into this section, including Brush Turbogenerators manufacturers of mechanical to electrical generation systems, Brush-Barclay and Brush Traction, both involved in rail locomotive manufacture and repair (on 28 February 2011 Wabtec announced that it had acquired Brush Traction for US$31 million) and Brush Transformers which manufactures electrical transformers and switchgear.

Other companies in this group are FKI switchgear (now renamed Hawker Siddeley Switchgear Ltd.) which incorporates Brush switchgear, Whipp & Bourne and others.

Harrington Generators International (HGI) manufacture generator sets for rail, road, and light commercial and agricultural use, as well as supplying the British Army (MoD) with generators.

MarelliMotori also produces electrical generators as well as induction motors.

=== Lifting products and services ===
Acco Material Handling manufactures cranes, hoists and other crane components as well as hand trucks.

Harris Waste Management Group, Inc manufactures balers and shredders for the waste recycling sector.

Welland Forge produces impression die forgings for the automotive, construction, agricultural and recreational markets.

=== Hardware ===
Truth Hardware corporation manufactures commercial window and doors, and fittings.

Weber Knapp produces office fittings including counterbalance devices.

== Former businesses ==
=== FKI Logistex ===
Logistex produces a full range of item handling automation systems including baggage handling, storage and retrieval systems, conveyors, library systems including RFID solutions, warehousing automation and sorting systems. The company's North American operations were acquired by Intelligrated in June 2009. The European Logistex operations known as Crisplant a/s, who specialized in airport systems, tilt tray and crossbelt sorters, were acquired by BEUMER GmbH in July 2009.
