= Tilt tray =

Tilt-tray may refer to:

- Tilt tray sorter
- Tilt tray tow truck
