= Brush SEM =

Czech electrical machinery manufacturer

BRUSH SEM
- Type: Limited liability company
- Industry: Electrical machinery
- Founded: 1859
- Founder: Count Wallenstein-Vartenberk
- Headquarters: Plzeň
- Area served: Worldwide
- Products: Generators, synchronous condensers, electric motors, excitation systems
- Owner: Baker Hughes
- Parent: BRUSH Power Generation
- Website: www.brush-sem.cz

BRUSH SEM is a Czech manufacturer of large generators and other electrical machinery based in Plzeň, Czech Republic. The company specialises in generators for gas turbine and steam turbine drive applications and is part of Baker Hughes' BRUSH Power Generation portfolio.

The industrial site on which BRUSH SEM is based was established in 1859, when Count Wallenstein-Vartenberk established a branch of his foundry and engineering works in Plzeň, approximately 100 km southwest of Prague.

In 1869, the plant was taken over by Emil Škoda, an engineer and entrepreneur who expanded the business considerably. During the 1880s, Škoda established a modern steelworks capable of producing large steel castings. The works subsequently became involved in the production of steel castings and forgings for ships, machinery and other heavy-engineering applications.

In 1899, the expanding business was transformed into a joint-stock company. Before the First World War the Škoda Works became one of the largest industrial enterprises in Austria-Hungary and a major supplier of heavy guns and ammunition to the army and navy. The First World War resulted in a highly expansion of military production and manufacturing capacity.

By 1917, the Škoda Works employed approximately 35,000 people in Plzeň and had acquired a number of companies in the Czech lands and abroad.

Following the establishment of Czechoslovakia in 1918 and the changing economic conditions of post-war Europe Škoda developed from a primarily armaments manufacturer into a diversified engineering group. Its production programme expanded to include locomotives, aircraft, ships, machine tools, steam turbines and power-engineering equipment.

The electrical machinery activities that later became associated with BRUSH SEM developed within the Škoda Works during this period. In 1924, Škoda manufactured its first turbogenerator with an output of 14 MW. The company subsequently expanded its production of generators and other electrical machinery.

During the 1930s, the deteriorating political situation in Europe resulted in another increase in military production. During the Second World War, the Škoda Works was incorporated into the German war-production system. The Plzeň works suffered extensive damage during Allied bombing raids in April 1945 with a substantial part of the industrial complex destroyed.

In 1945, the Škoda Works was nationalised. The company was subsequently divided into a number of specialised enterprises. The Plzeň operations increasingly concentrated on heavy engineering, industrial equipment transportation and power engineering, with a large proportion of production being exported to countries of the Eastern Bloc.

Following the political changes of 1989 and the subsequent dissolution of Czechoslovakia in 1993, the electrical machinery activities operated as Škoda Elektrické Stroje. The plant primarily manufactured generators and electrical equipment for markets in Central and Eastern Europe and the Soviet Union.

The transition to a market economy required the company to develop new products and seek customers outside the former Council for Mutual Economic Assistance trading system. Škoda Elektrické Stroje retained its engineering and manufacturing capabilities but faced difficulties in adapting to international competition and commercial tendering.

In 2001, the British engineering group FKI plc acquired the electrical machinery business from the Škoda group. The business was subsequently operated under the BRUSH SEM name. The acquisition expanded BRUSH's manufacturing capabilities for large turbogenerators and established a major BRUSH production base in Plzeň. At the time of the acquisition, approximately 840 employees were transferred to the new ownership.

In 2008, Melrose Industries acquired FKI plc, including BRUSH SEM. Under Melrose ownership, the BRUSH businesses were increasingly integrated with BRUSH SEM becoming an important manufacturing centre for large generators.

During the 2010s, the Plzeň plant continued to manufacture generators for power generation projects around the world. In 2019, BRUSH reorganised its manufacturing operations transferring generator production from its facilities in the United Kingdom and the Netherlands to the Czech Republic. By 2020, the Plzeň plant employed more than 500 people and had become the principal manufacturing location for BRUSH generators.

In August 2022, Baker Hughes announced an agreement to acquire the Power Generation division of BRUSH from One Equity Partners. The acquisition included BRUSH's generator, synchronous condenser, electric motor and related electrical machinery businesses. The transaction was completed in October 2022, bringing BRUSH Power Generation into Baker Hughes' Industrial & Energy Technology portfolio.

Since the acquisition, the Plzeň operation has continued as part of BRUSH Power Generation under Baker Hughes. The company's current portfolio includes large generators, synchronous condensers, electric motors, excitation systems and related services. The Plzeň facility specialises in generators for gas and steam turbine applications, particularly machines rated above 20 MVA.

The Plzeň facility has manufactured more than 3,000 generators, which have been supplied to customers in markets around the world. Its products are used in power generation, industrial facilities, oil and gas, utilities and other energy-related applications.

== See also ==
- Škoda Works
- Baker Hughes
- Electrical generator
