= Cross belt (disambiguation) =

Cross belt or crossbelt is a type of belt in military uniforms.

The term may also refer to:

- Cross Belt (film), a 1970 Indian Malayalam-language film
- Crossbelt Mani (1935–2021), Indian film director and cinematographer in Malayalam cinema
- Cross-belt, an element of the Sam Browne belt
- Cross belt sorter, sortation system consisting of a chain of conveyor belts

== See also ==
- Shoulder belt (disambiguation)
