= Hawker Siddeley Switchgear =

BRUSH Switchgear Australia
- Type: Engineering group
- Industry: Electrical power products manufacturing
- Genre: Sub-brand of group of companies
- Owner: Brush Group
- Parent: FKI
- Website: https://www.brush.eu/

BRUSH Switchgear Australia is a British manufacturer of electrical switchgear and overhead line equipment, the company operates a wholly owned subsidiary in Australia.

Based in the United Kingdom and are owned by BRUSH Group.

== History ==
In 1957, Hawker Siddeley group acquired the Brush Group, and in 1973 Brush Switchgear acquired Bowthorpe's power equipment division, with factories at Bridgend and Banbury. In 1991 South Wales Switchgear merged with Brush Switchgear to form Hawker Siddeley Switchgear Limited.

The company was bought by FKI in 1996 becoming part of FKI Switchgear; a division also including the company Whipp & Bourne since 1986.

In 2008 Melrose plc acquired FKI along with its Switchgear group, following which FKI Switchgear once again became Hawker Siddeley Switchgear.

As of 2009 Melrose has incorporated four electrical switchgear manufacturers:

- Hawker Siddeley Switchgear Ltd - formed in 1991 from South Wales Switchgear and Brush Switchgear
  - South Wales Switchgear - (founded 1941) - instrumental in developing SF_{6} gas insulated switchgear.
  - Brush Switchgear - (Brush Electrical Engineering company founded 1888) - pioneers of vacuum switchgear.
- Hawker Siddeley Switchgear Pty Ltd in Australia (HSSA) - (in operation since 1964) - subsidiary of Hawker Siddeley Switchgear.
- Whipp & Bourne - (established in 1903 by Samuel Whipp and Charles Bourne).

== Products ==
Highly trusted AC and DC solutions, the BRUSH Switchgear product range includes products such as CRYNO, which are suitable for a wide range of demanding applications. Designed and built by the BRUSH engineering experts, the BRUSH Switchgear Australia products offer many benefits, including ease of maintenance, smaller footprints, reliability, and of course, high-speed performance.

The company has supplied equipment for the Channel Tunnel rail link, the Metro-North Railroad and the Dubai Metro program amongst others.
