= Nigel Stein =

British businessman (born 1955)

- Born: Nigel MacRae Stein; 15 October 1955 (age 70)
- Education: University of Edinburgh
- Occupation: Businessman
- Years active: 1976–present
- Title: CEO, GKN
- Term: 2012–present
- Predecessor: Sir Kevin Smith
- Successor: Incumbent
- Spouse: Jane Stein

Nigel MacRae Stein (born 15 October 1955) is a British businessman. He is the chief executive (CEO) of GKN, a British multinational automotive and aerospace components company.

== Early life ==
Stein has a bachelor's degree in Engineering Science from the University of Edinburgh.

== Career ==
He has been CEO of GKN since January 2012. He was also president of the Society of Motor Manufacturers and Traders from 2011 to 2012, and a non-executive director of Wolseley plc.

Stein was awarded an honorary doctorate by the University of Bath in June 2015.
