= Dowlais Group =

British company

Dowlais Group Ltd.
- Company type: Private
- Traded as: LSE: DWL
- Industry: Automotive; Powder metallurgy
- Founded: 2023; 3 years ago
- Successor: Dauch
- Headquarters: London, England, UK
- Key people: Simon Mackenzie Smith (Chairman); Liam Butterworth (CEO)
- Revenue: ▼£4,337 million (2024)
- Operating income: ▲£(106) million (2024)
- Net income: ▲£(168) million (2024)
- Website: www.dowlais.com

Dowlais Group Ltd. is a British company operating in the automotive and powder metallurgy industries. It was listed on the London Stock Exchange and was a constituent of the FTSE 250 Index until it was acquired by Dauch in February 2026.

== History ==
In April 2023, Melrose Industries completed the demerger of GKN Automotive and GKN Powder Metallurgy from GKN as Dowlais Group. This name was chosen with the intention of evoking the Dowlais Ironworks where GKN licensed the Bessemer process, using it to produce steel, in 1865.

GKN Automotive originated from J. W. Garrington, a company specializing in forgings initially produced at the Garrington Darlaston plant and later supplemented by the Bromsgrove plant. This made GKN a major supplier of crankshafts, connecting rods, half-shafts and numerous smaller forged components to the UK auto-industry, which underwent a period of significant expansion over time.

Later, a new factory dedicated to the production of wheels was established near Wellington, Shropshire. By the 1960s, the company had become a manufacturer of constant-velocity joints, which are used to transfer the engine's power to the wheels.

In turn, GKN Powder Metallurgy has its origins in Hoeganaes Corporation in North America, which GKN acquired in 1998.

In July 2025, six months after it was announced that American Axle had made a $1.4 billion offer to acquire Dowlais, the transaction was approved by the shareholders of both companies. The deal was completed after the court also approved the transaction on 30 January 2026. By March 2026, visitors to the Dowlais website were being redirected to Dauch, the recently renamed American Axle.
