= Brush Traction =

British locomotive manufacturer

Coordinates: 52°46′55″N 1°11′50″W

- Founded: 1865
- Headquarters: Loughborough, England
- Parent: Wabtec
- Website: www.brushtraction.com

Brush Traction was a manufacturer and maintainer of railway locomotives in Loughborough, England, whose operations have now been merged into the Wabtec company's Doncaster UK operations.

== History ==
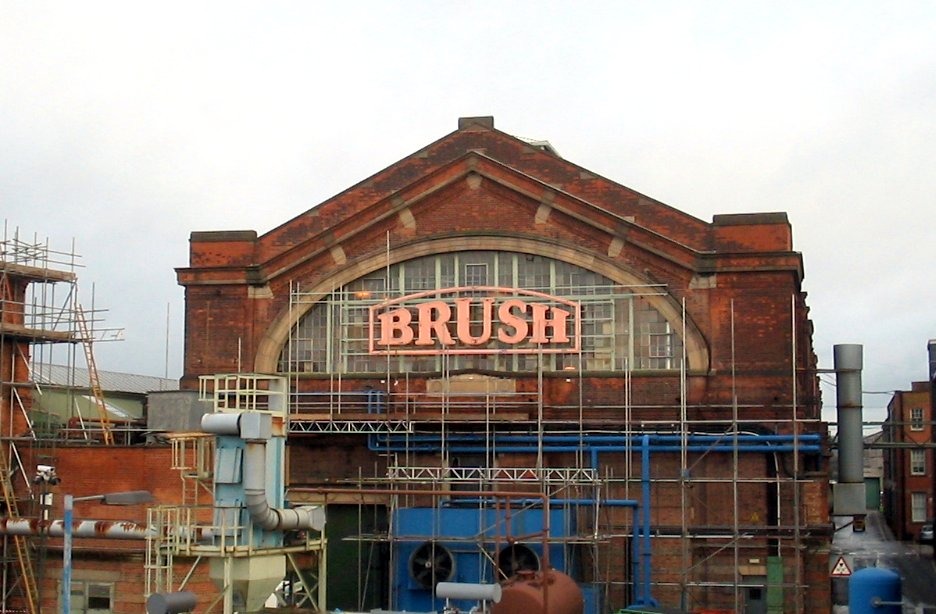
Brush Traction works in Loughborough

=== Hughes' Locomotive & Tramway Engine Works ===
Henry Hughes had been operating at the Falcon Works since the 1850s, producing items such as brass and iron cast parts for portable engines and thrashing machines. In 1860 Henry Hughes announced he had entered into a partnership with William March who had extensive experience in the timber trade, and this would be added to the existing business of "engineers and manufacturers of railway plant", with the business to be called Hughes and March.

In March 1863, Hughes announced it was making a steam locomotive designed for contractors and mineral railways. This was an 0-4-0ST with a 200 psi boiler pressure and cylinders of 10 inch bore and 15 inch stroke.

In 1866, Hughes announced a sale of timber and associated equipment from the "Falcon Railway Plant Works" as he had decided to close down the timber side of his business, also sold was a portable steam engine and thrashing engine.

In 1877, a limited company (Hughes' Locomotive & Tramway Engine Works Ltd) was created with Henry Hughes as managing director, to carry on the business previously under the name of the "Falcon Railway Plant Works". The business included the production of the original small saddle tank locomotives, but was anticipating increased demand for the production of tram engines, lightweight steam engines (usually with condensers) which drew passenger cars, made possible by the Tramways Act 1870 (33 & 34 Vict. c. 78). His original patented tramway engine was reported to have been tested on the Vale of Clyde and other tramways with good results. Tram engines were distinct from those tramcars where the boiler mechanism was an integral part of the passenger car.

Examples of early engines include the tramway locomotive The Pioneer of 1877 for the Swansea and Mumbles Railway, 0-4-2ST Belmont which ran on the Snailbeach District Railways, and three 2 ft 3 in (686 mm) gauge 0-4-0STs for the Corris Railway supplied in 1878 (converted between 1883 and 1900 to 0-4-2STs).

In 1881, Hughes' built two 3 ft (914 mm) gauge 0-4-0ST for the Liverpool Corporation Waterworks for use in the construction of the waterworks at Lake Vyrnwy in Wales.

The adoption of steam tram engines in the UK was very limited, though the company did make some sales abroad, for example in Paris and Lille. In February 1881, a shareholder and creditor asked that the voluntary winding up of the company should proceed under the supervision of the court, and an order was granted. Hughes departed, soon after, for New Zealand, where in collaboration with local engineer E.W Mills, he built small tramway engines.

=== Falcon Engine & Car Works ===
Hughes's Locomotive & Tramway Engine Works was sold as a going concern, and continued production as the Falcon Engine and Car Works Ltd. In July 1882, they provided a tram engine (Falcon works number 43) for testing on the Burnley tramways, which during a late night trial suffered a condenser rupture scalding several people. This was just days after a serious fire at the works had caused considerable losses - fortunately the premises were insured.

Business continued with the production of locomotives, carriages, wagons and tramcars. This included three more locomotives of the same design as previously for the railways at Vyrnwy. In 1883, the first tramcar on the Alford and Sutton Tramway, was a horse-drawn 16-seater made by Falcon Engine and Carriage Works.

One of the less conventional products were the carriages and wagons for the Listowel to Ballybunion monorail (using the Lartigue Monorail system), which opened in 1888. The engines for this line were made by Hunslet.

Other products were tank locomotives for Ireland, Spain and the Azores. Some were subcontracts from other firms, such as Kerr, Stuart and Company, at that time, in Glasgow.

=== Brush Electrical Engineering Company ===
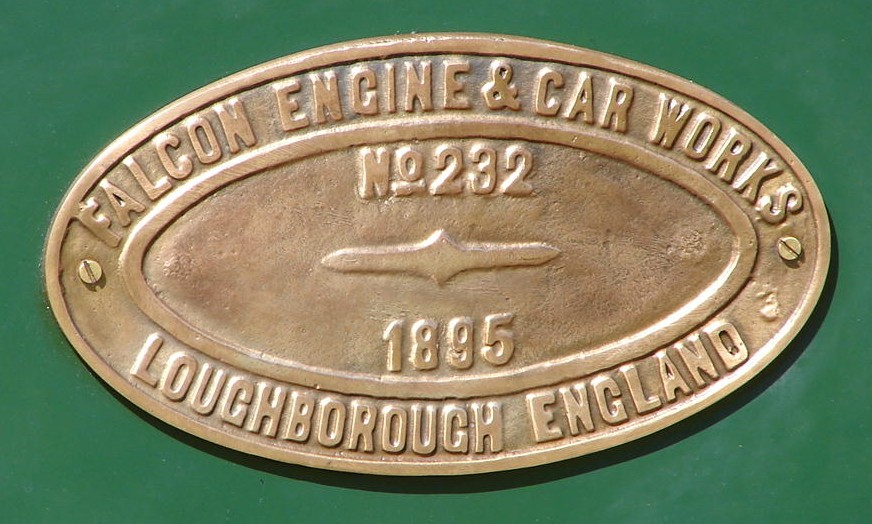
Works plate on Beira Railway BR7 4-4-0

In 1889, the Anglo-American Brush Electric Light Corporation Ltd was reconstructed, absorbing the Australasian Electric Light, Power, and Storage Company Ltd, and taking over the Falcon Works in Loughborough, with the new company to be called the Brush Electrical Engineering Company Ltd.

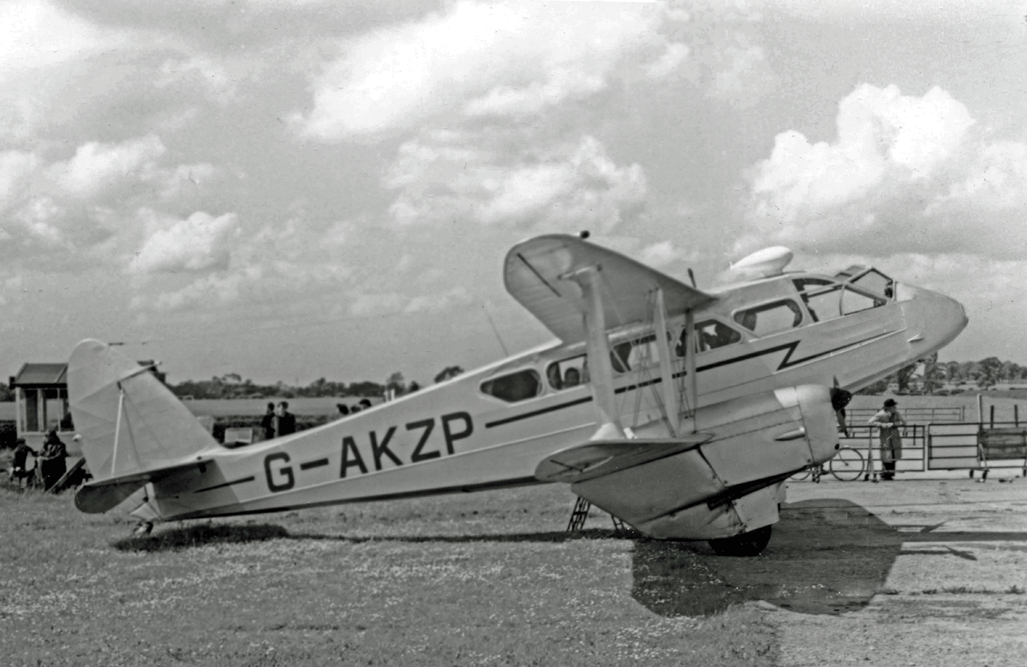
de Havilland DH.89 Dominie built by Brush in April 1945 for the RAF

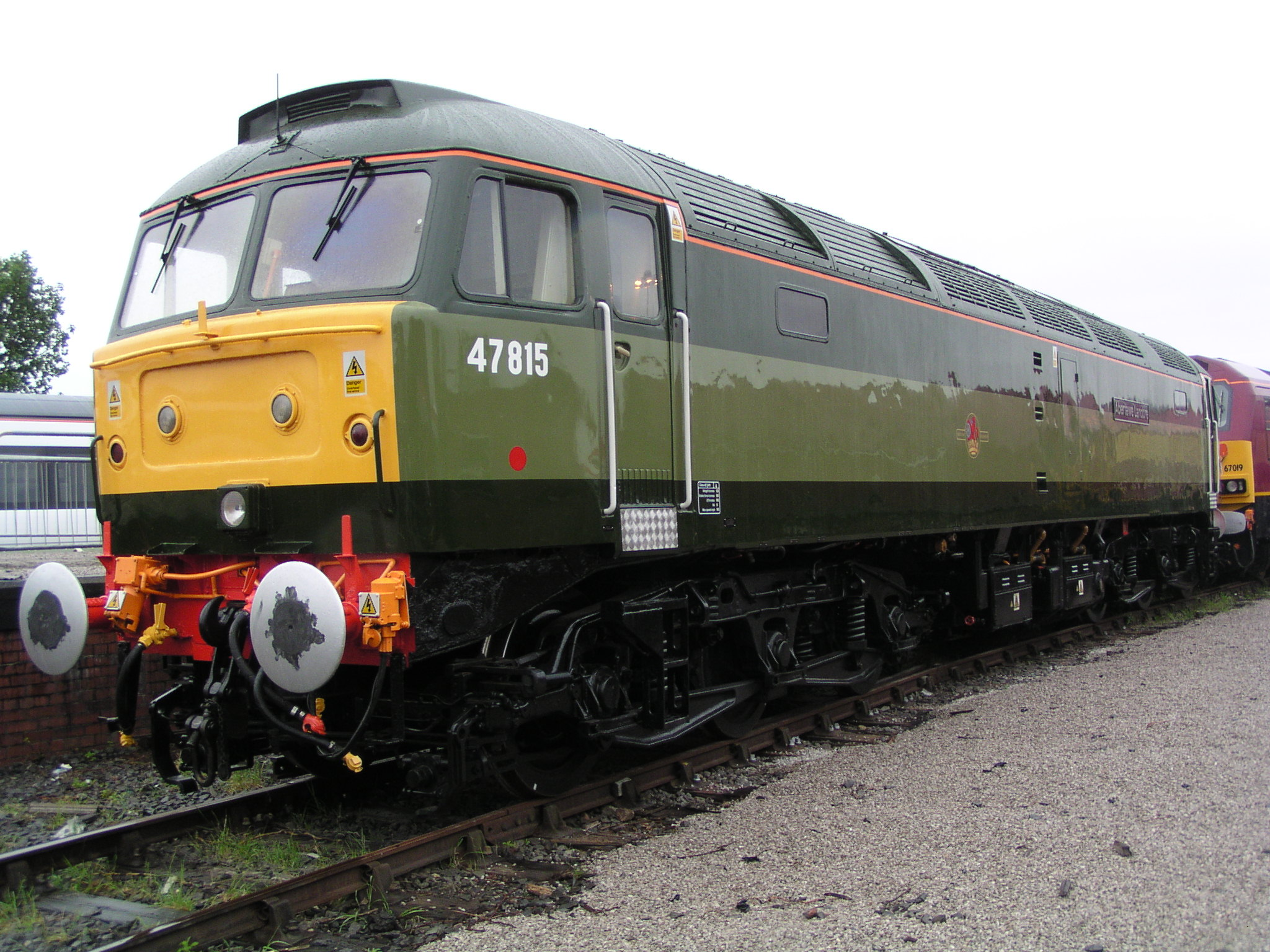
First Great Western 47815 Abertawe Landore in June 2004

From reports of the annual general meetings, the main activities in the 1890s were associated with municipal and ships lighting, however it is evident they were still involved with rail and tramcars and were anticipating a great increase in the market for electric traction particularly on tramways. They expanded the works by 5 acres in 1897 and added another 250 tramcars per year of production capacity. In 1898, they added capacity to make 1,000 electric traction motors per year, their own motors now claimed to be equal to or superior to the American pattern traction motors previously used.

Brush introduced its first automobile in March of 1902, along with three more models with more horsepower later that year, all incorporating Abeille engines. Later, in 1904, Brush also manufactured six Brushmobile vehicles similar to those made by Vauxhall Motors; one of these six vehicles featured in the 1966 film Carry On Screaming. In addition, nearly 100 buses, plus some lorries were built using French engines until 1907.

Brush Electrical Engineering also built some carriages that were used on the Central London Railway and the City and South London Railway in the early 1900s, the respective forerunners of London Underground's Central and Northern lines.

In all, about 250 steam locomotives were built in addition to their tram engines. Production finished after World War I and the company concentrated on transport-related electrical equipment, including tramcars, trolleybuses and battery-operated vehicles.

Brush made 2-foot gauge battery electric narrow-gauge locomotives (at the time referred to as Brush Electric Tractors) during the war, three which were listed as surplus in October 1919. Several examples survive, one at the National Slate Museum, Llanberis, three of them went to Hythe Pier, Railway and Ferry, of which two of these remain. These were reported to have originally worked at the Avonmouth mustard gas factory. One from HM's Explosives Factory at Queensferry has been restored using parts from another from the same factory.

During World War II, Brush Coachworks diversified into aircraft production, building 335 de Havilland Dominies for the Royal Air Force and Fleet Air Arm. Wing sections were built for Lancaster bombers and Hampden fuselages were overhauled.

The coachworks continued after the war with omnibus bodies mounted on Daimler chassis using Gardner five-cylinder diesel engines and Daimler preselector gearboxes, as well as AEC and BMMO Chassis for Midland Red and 100 Leyland Titans for Birmingham City Transport. They also constructed bodies designed by the British Electric Traction group on Leyland Royal Tigers. In 1952, the coachworks were closed and the goodwill and patents were bought by neighbouring Willowbrook.

=== Brush Bagnall Traction ===
Close to Derby and its railway workshops, it retained its contacts with the railway. Acquired by Heenan & Froude in 1947, it was merged with W. G. Bagnall to produce diesel locomotives. In 1951, the company Brush Bagnall Traction Limited was formed. When British Railways began to replace its fleet of steam engines, Brush entered the market for main line diesel-electric locomotives.

=== Brush Traction ===
In 1957, the Brush group were bought up by Hawker Siddeley. In 1967, the rail tractor business of Crompton Parkinson was purchased. As part of Hawker Siddeley Electric Power Group, it then passed to BTR plc and became Brush Traction. Later it became part of FKI Energy Technologies, itself purchased in 2008 by Melrose Industries.

In 2007, Brush Traction acquired Hunslet-Barclay with a facility in Kilmarnock. It was rebranded Brush-Barclay.

In February 2011, Wabtec purchased Brush Traction for US$31 million.

The locomotive works are still occupied by the Brush Traction Company and are in use for the building, overhaul and repair of locomotives.

In April 2021, Wabtec announced the Loughborough factory would close with reduced work volumes making the site unsustainable.

== Locomotives ==
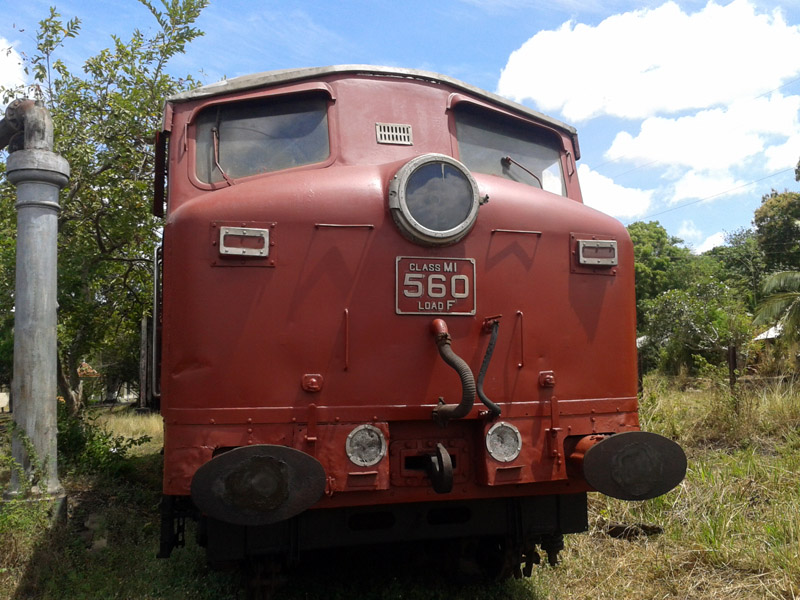
Sri Lanka Railways M1 Locomotive

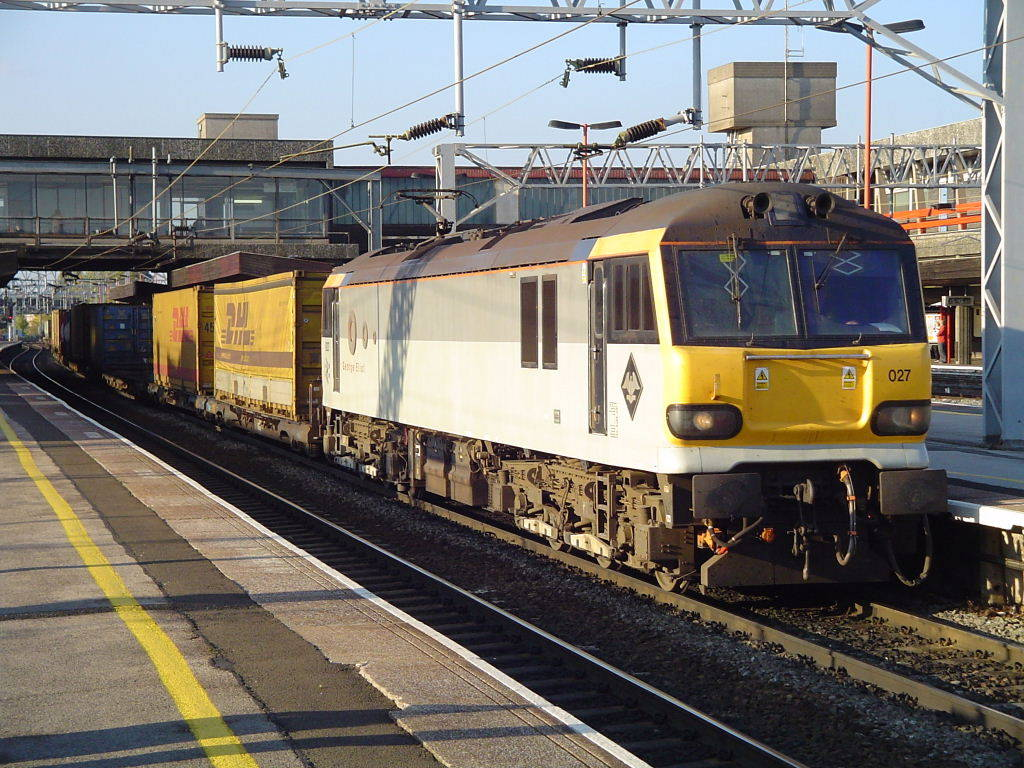
BR class 92 electric locomotive no. 92027 George Eliot

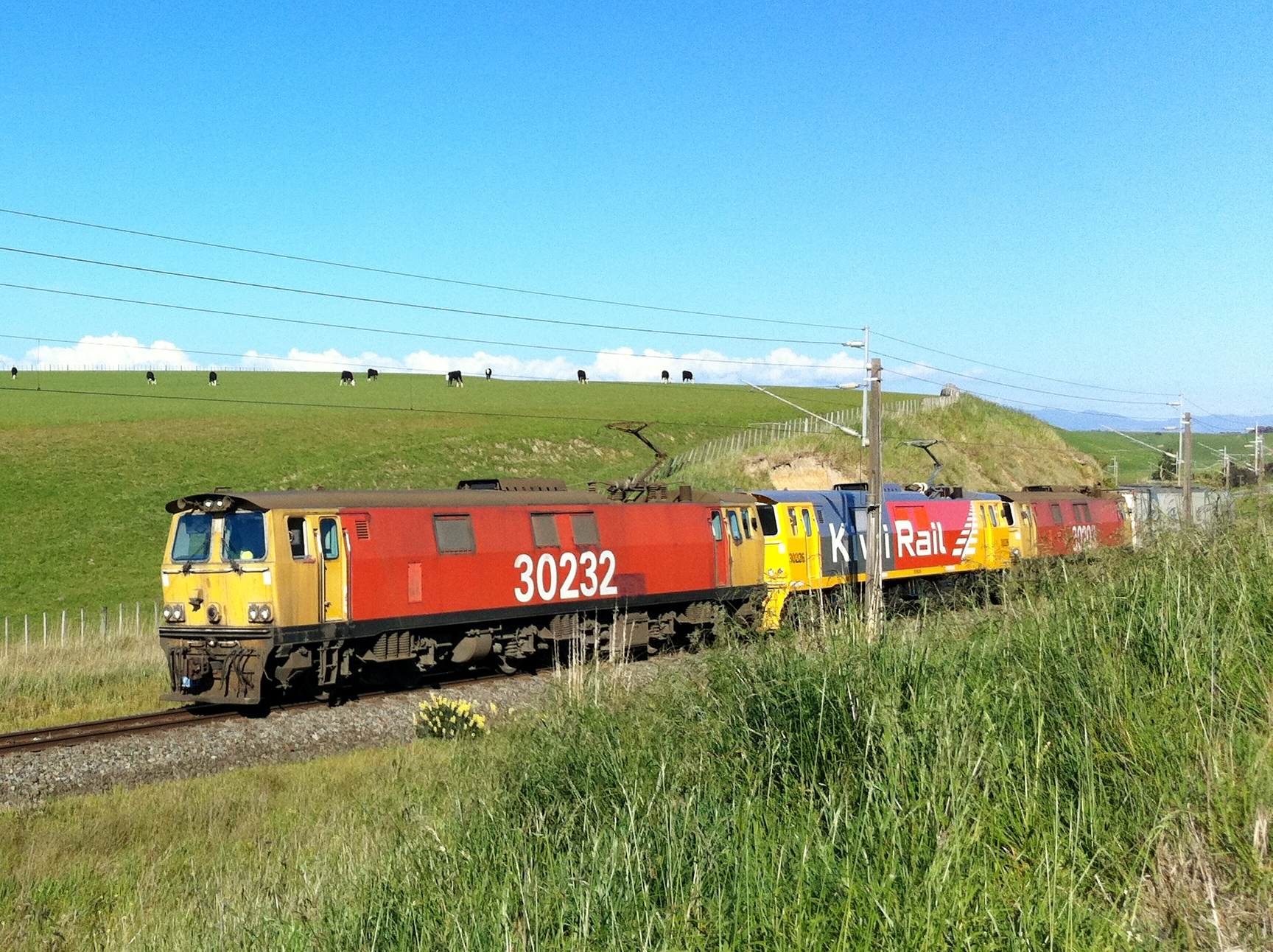
Three New Zealand EF locomotives with a freight train

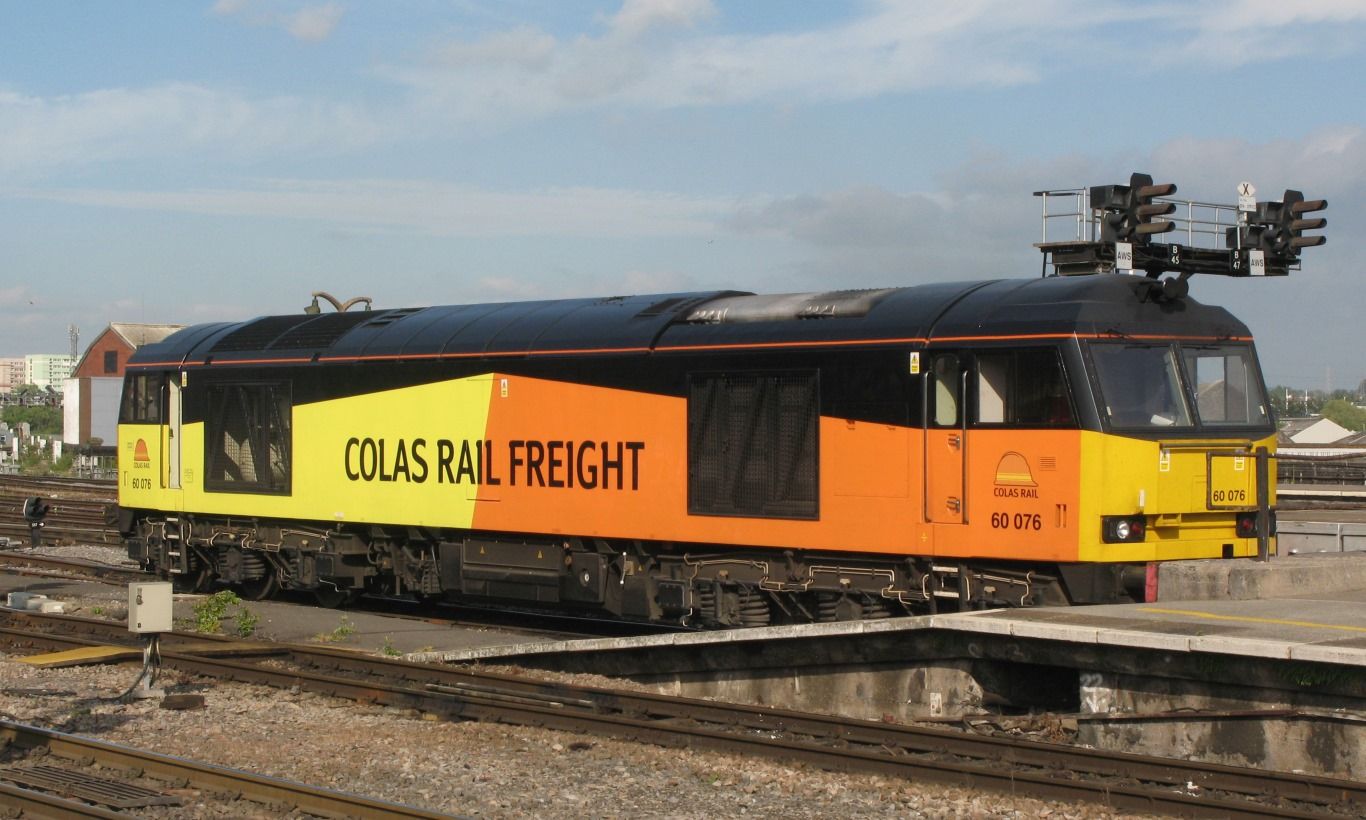
Class 60 diesel locomotive in Colas Rail livery in 2015

Brush manufactured various diesel and electric locomotives for the British railway network:

- Class 31 "Brush Type 2" mixed-traffic diesel locomotive
- Class 47 "Brush Type 4" mixed-traffic diesel locomotive (manufacture shared with Crewe Works)
- Class 48 "Brush Type 4" mixed-traffic diesel locomotive
- Class 53 Falcon prototype diesel locomotive
- HS4000 Kestrel
- Class 57 re-engineered diesel locomotive (rebuilt from Class 47)
- Class 60 heavy freight diesel locomotive
- Class 92 dual-voltage electric locomotive

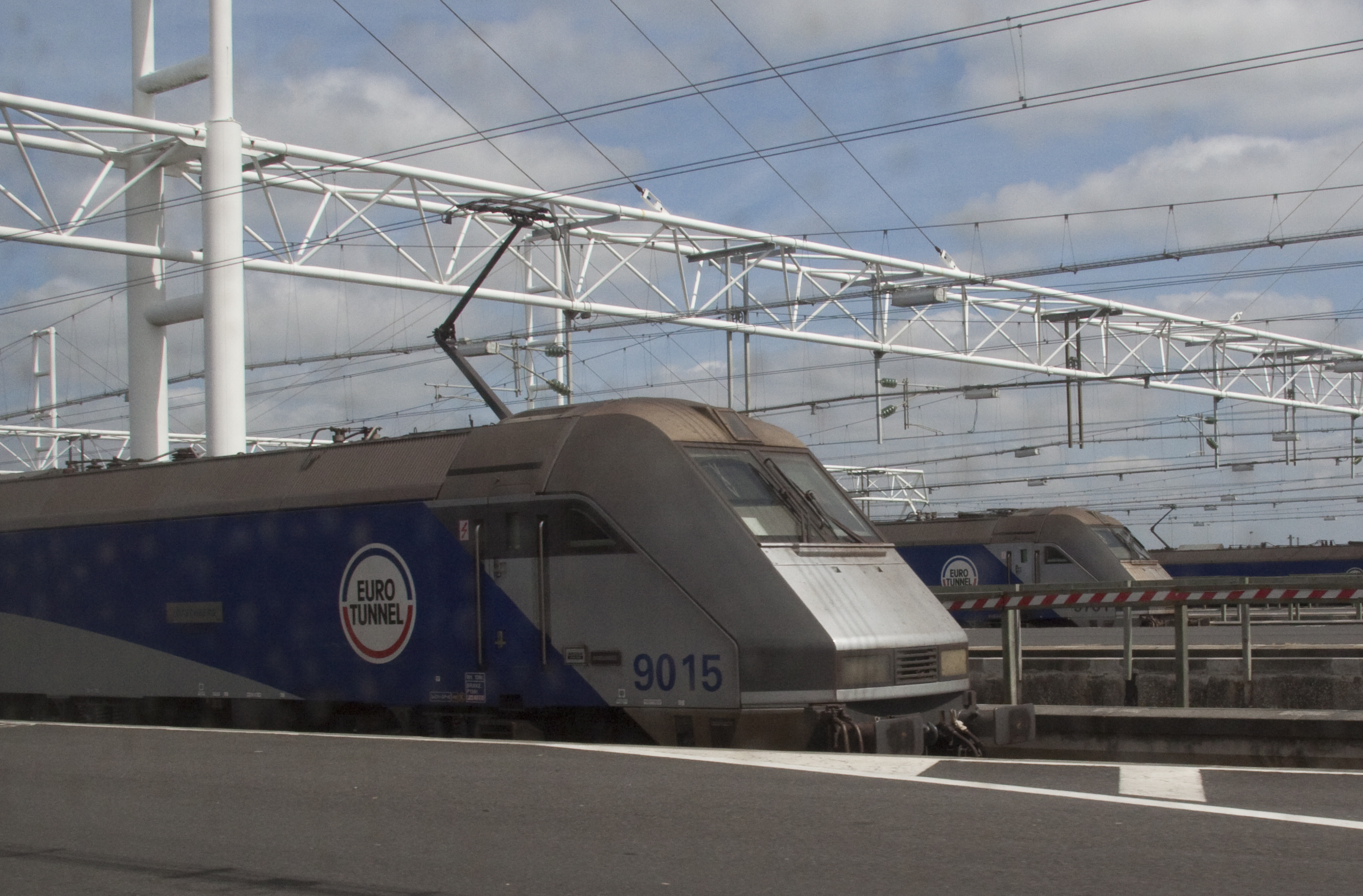
Eurotunnel Class 9 locomotive

It also manufactured the Eurotunnel Class 9 electric locomotives operated by Eurotunnel through the Channel Tunnel.

Brush Traction also manufactured locomotives for export:

- 800 bhp A1A-A1A main line diesel-electric locomotives for Ceylon in 1952 (Sri Lanka Railways M1)
- 1,000 bhp Bo-Bo diesel-electric locomotives for Sri Lanka in 1981 (the M7 class)
- Class DE4 1730 bhp Co-Co narrow gauge diesel-electric locomotives for Rhodesia (now Zimbabwe) in 1963
- Various Bo-Bo diesel electric freight locomotives to Cuba, Tanzania, Gabon, Morocco
- Battery electric locomotives to Hong Kong
- EF class heavy freight electric locomotive (New Zealand Railways Corporation)
- Class 18 shunter locomotives for Malayan Railways in 1978

They were also a major supplier of traction equipment to rapid transit systems, in particular, London Underground and Docklands Light Railway in the UK, and to Canada and Taiwan.

Traction equipment was supplied to British Rail for various Electric Multiple Unit trains, the Class 43 HST diesel locomotive, with similar equipment being supplied to Comeng in Australia in 1979, and used in the Class 56 and 58 freight locomotives.

Brush repowered most Class 43 HST power cars with MTU engines between 2005 and 2010.

== Surviving steam locomotives ==
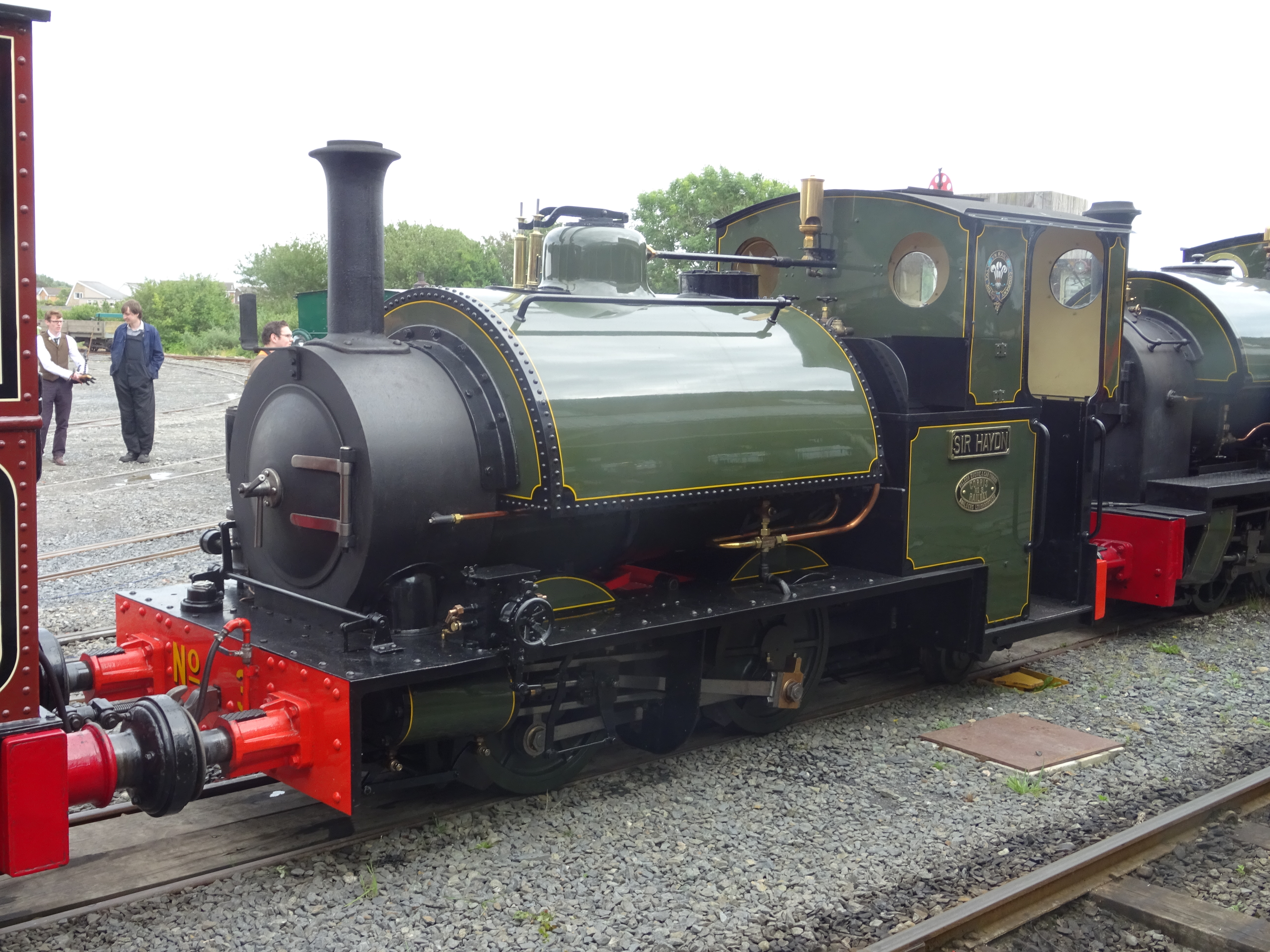
Narrow-gauge steam locomotive no. 3 Sir Haydn

- No. 3 ‘Sir Haydn’, the third Hughes/Falcon locomotive supplied to the Corris Railway, works number 323 (although incorporating parts from 324 and probably 322 as well) now runs on the neighbouring Talyllyn Railway
- A standard gauge 0-4-0ST built by Brush Electrical Engineering for Powesland and Mason & Co., Swansea Docks; is preserved at Mountsorrel & Rothley Community Heritage Centre, Leicestershire
- A broad gauge (seven-foot) saddle tank loco built at the Falcon Works survives in the Azores
- 2 ft (610 mm) gauge Falcon locomotives Nos. 265 and 266 ex-Beria Railway are in the Vale of Rheidol Railway Museum Collection, although not currently on public view.
- Metre gauge Ex. F.C. Reus - Salou No. 3 0-4-0T Falcon of 1886. Preserved in Salou, Spain, on a plinth adjacent to the former terminus of the F.C. Reus-Salou. A former turntable is also outside the old station. Only some 30 metres from the current RENFE station.
- Metre gauge Ex. F.C. Reus - Salou 0-4-0T No.6 Falcon 153/1888. Preserved in a public park in Cambrils near Salou.
- Metre gauge Ex. F.C. Reus – Salou No.5 'SALOU' 0-4-0T Falcon 118/1886. Preserved at Reus, Spain.
- Metre gauge Ex. F.C. Olot - Gerona No.4 0-6-2T Builder: Falcon 281/1899. Preserved at Reus.
- Elfkarleö Bruk No. 1, built in 1873 by Henry Hughes & Co., bought second-hand by Älvkarleö Mill in 1876 and was used as shunter between the mill and Älvkarleö station on the Uppsala Gefle Railway which was then newly opened. The locomotive was in use until 1945 when it was acquired by the museum.

== Surviving diesel locomotives ==
Over 75 examples of Brush Traction built engines have been preserved and can be seen at heritage railways across the United Kingdom. Many more examples can still be seen in action today on the mainlines.

== Preserved light rail/tramway vehicles ==
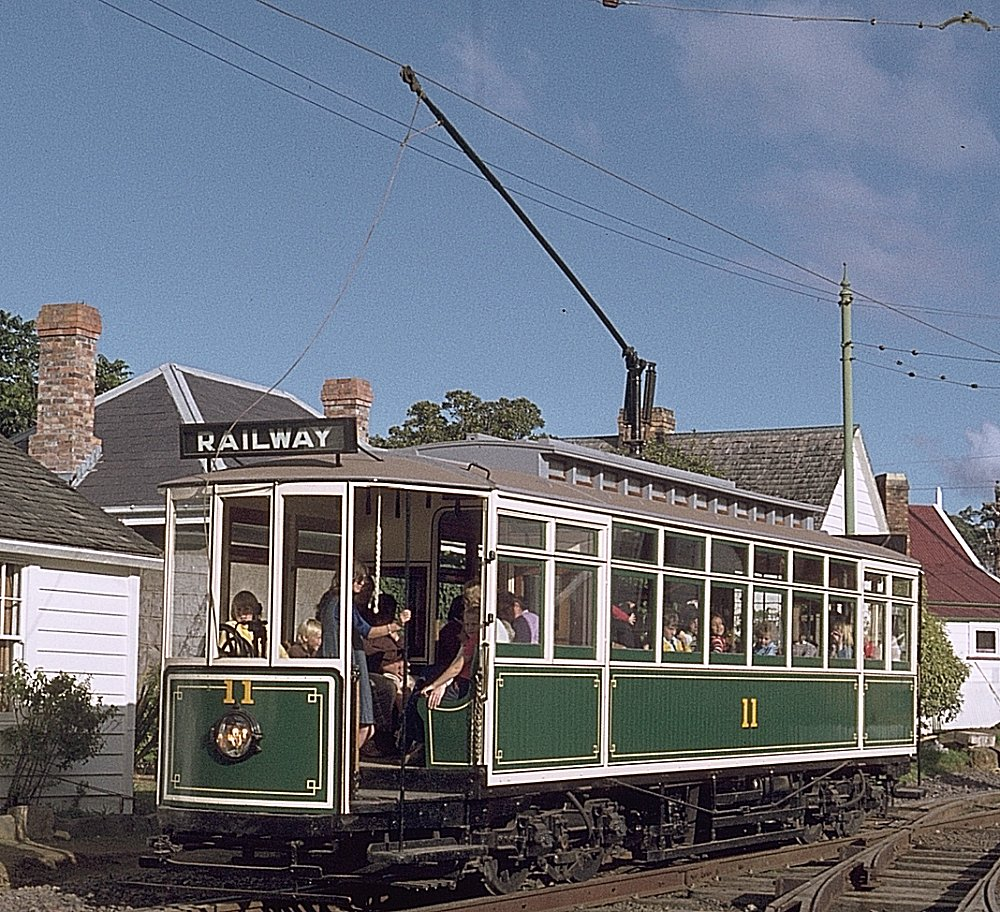
Auckland Electric Tramways car 11

Preserved Auckland, New Zealand, including Museum of Transport and Technology:

- Auckland Electric Tramways Company, No. 11 (1902) – double-bogie (Brush D1) saloon tram. Restored
- Auckland Electric Tramways Company, No. 17 (1902) – double-bogie (Brush D1) double-decker tram. Unrestored.
- Auckland Electric Tramways Company, No. 24 / No. 26 (1902) – Privately preserved box cars bodies only, which originally resided on a Brush four-wheel trucks. Unrestored.
- Auckland Electric Tramways Company, No. 44 – (1906) AETCL built box car body which originally resided on a Brush four-wheel truck. Retired 1931. Restored 2006 using a former Brussels 21E truck. Restored.
- Preserved Auckland trams 89 and 91 originally fitted with Brush D1 trucks with Brush 1200 motors and 147 fitted with Brush Improved trucks and 203 refitted with the same.
- Auckland Brush truck remnants. In 2012, excavations at the former Mount Roskill Bus Depot circa 1951 for a new shopping centre uncovered over a dozen Brush D side frames along with a single Brush improved side frame and remnants of Brush 1200 and Brush 1400 Motor cases. The side frames are now in MOTAT's possession for research and future Auckland tram restorations with the motor remnants being cared for in private hands for possible replication for various projects. It is believed to be the only Brush 1200 and 1400 motors to have survived in New Zealand if not the world.
- Component drawings for Brush H2 and Brush H4 Controllers exist in the archives of the Auckland Electric Tramways Trust with a view to producing replicas.
- Brush four-wheel truck – a copy of a 21e Brill. built for the Napier Tramways, New Zealand. Tram number unknown. Tram bodies sold off 1931 after the Napier earthquake. The truck used subsequently as the running gear for a Saw Mill railway shunter at the Robert Holt and Sons' sawmill. Does not have traction motors.

Preserved in the United Kingdom:

- Chesterfield No. 7 (1904) – Preserved at the National Tramway Museum, Derbyshire. It was used as a holiday cottage from 1927 until 1973, when it was purchased for preservation. It was restored between 1993 and 1996 at a cost of £120,000, and has been operational since 1997.
- Derby Corporation Tramways No. 1 (1904) – Preserved by the National Tramway Museum, Derbyshire, as a static exhibit. It was used as a holiday cottage from 1933 to 1962, and was restored between then and 1970. It was re-gauged from 4 ft (1,219 mm) to standard gauge during the restoration, and was put on public display as a non-operational exhibit in 1991. In 2021 it was in off-site storage.
- Blackpool Tramways No. 298/635 (1937) – Owned by National Tramway Museum, it was on public display from 2005 to 2014. Subsequently, it was moved to their offsite storage facility, awaiting funds, resources and space for a full restoration. A new underframe has been fabricated, and work on full restoration is expected to begin in mid-2021.
- Blackpool Tramways No. 630 (1937) – Preserved at the National Tramway Museum, Derbyshire, this has a streamlined body and was modernised in the mid-1990s, before being retired by Blackpool Transport in 2011. It was used in public service until 2019, and has since only been used for training purposes. Its future is under consideration, as No.298 is being restored to operational condition, and is much closer to its 1937 as-built appearance.
- Blackpool Tramways No. 623 (1937) – Preserved at the Heaton Park Heritage Tramway, Heaton Park, Manchester. Currently operational. Streamlined body. Retired by Blackpool Transport in 2008.
- Blackpool Tramways No. 631 (1937) – Preserved by its original owner as part of their heritage fleet of vehicles. Currently operational. Modernised mid-1990s (though it has now reverted to its 1950s condition) Streamlined body. Retired by Blackpool Transport in 2011.
- Blackpool Tramways No. 626 (1937) – Preserved by the Merseyside Tramway Preservation Society. Currently operational following resolution of an ownership dispute with Merseytravel, 2014. Streamlined body. Modernised mid-1990s. Retired by Blackpool Transport in 2010.
- Blackpool Tramways No. 634 (1937) – Preserved privately in Rushden, Northamptonshire. Under restoration. Streamlined body. Retired by Blackpool Transport in 2004.
- Blackpool Tramways No. 762 (1982) – Preserved at the National Tramway Museum, Derbyshire. Currently operational. Made predominantly from parts of 714 (English Electric of 1934) by Blackpool Transport, with Brush Trucks and controllers. It moved to Crich after being retired in 2011, and has been operational there since 2014.
- Hythe Pier, Railway and Ferry engine numbers 16302 & 16307. These two 1917 locomotives were originally battery-electric vehicles supplied to the Avonmouth Mustard Gas Factory. Three locomotives were obtained by Hythe Pier Railway, with one being used for spares, and the other two were converted to draw power at 250V DC from a third rail. They operate the longest continually working pier train service in the United Kingdom.

Preserved / Operating on Manx Electric Railway Isle of Man:

- Manx Electric Railway rolling stock with Brush D trucks. Bodies by other builders.
  - Nos 1 & 2 (1893)
  - Nos 5, 6, 7 & 9 (1894)
  - No 16 (1898)
  - No 34 (1995) Works Car

== Battery-electric vehicles ==
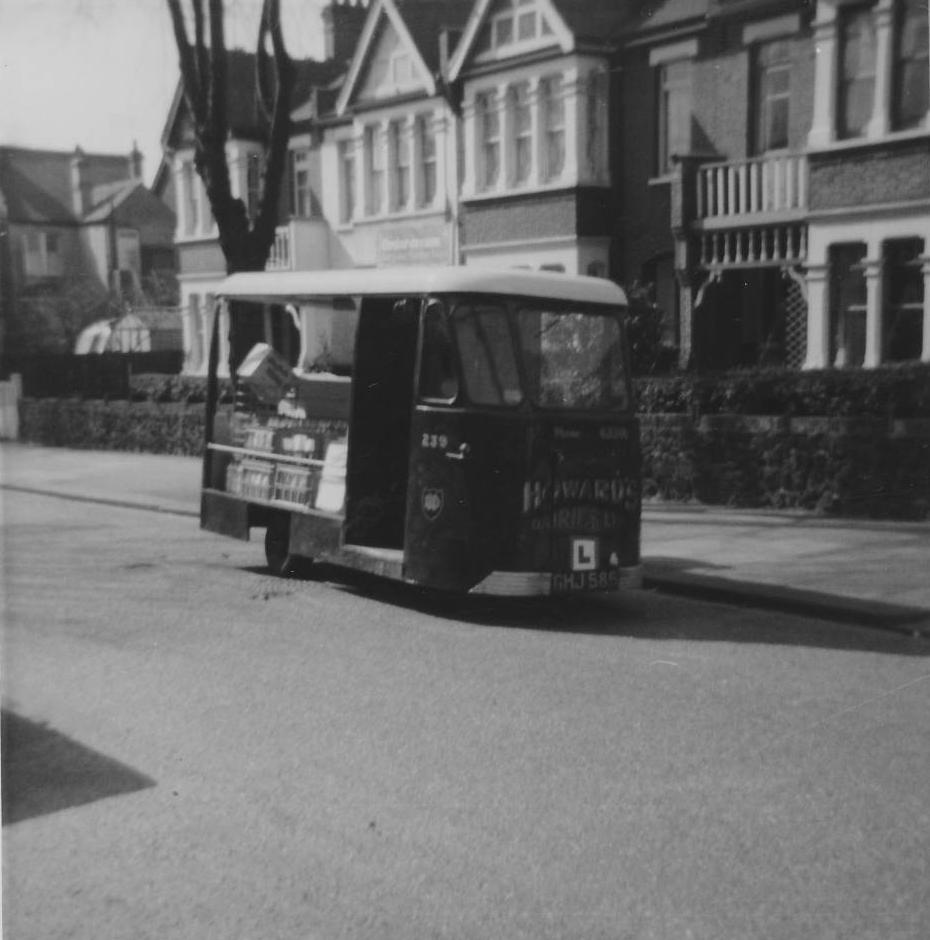
A Brush Pony milk float operated by Howards Dairies, seen near Southchurch Boulevarde depot, Southend-on-Sea, around 1970

In 1940, Brush required some small battery-electric tractor units, but as none were commercially available, they asked AC Morrison of AE Morrison and Sons (later Morrison-Electricar) to produce a design for one. Morrisons produced a 3-wheeled design, which Brush then used to manufacture a number of units for internal use. Subsequently, they began selling them on the open market and shipped a large order to Russia in 1941. They added battery electric road vehicles to their product list in 1945, buying the designs and manufacturing rights from Metropolitan-Vickers, so that early Brush vehicles are almost indistinguishable from late Metro-Vicks. 3-wheeled vehicles were marketed as the Brush Pony, and they also produced 4-wheeled vehicles. In 1948 they added a 2-ton chassis to their range, which could be supplied with a large van, standard van, flat truck or milk float body. The welded box-section chassis was fitted with semi-elliptic springs and a Lockheed hydraulic braking system. The 36-cell 290 Ahr battery was mounted on both sides of the central spine. The electric motor was connected to a banjo-type rear axle by a Layrub propeller shaft. In common with other Brush vehicles, control was by a double-depression foot pedal, where the first depression gave two stages of control with the two-halves of the battery connected in parallel, and the second depression gave a further two stages with the batteries in series.

In early 1949, they reduced the prices of their electric vehicles by around 25 per cent, in an attempt to make them more competitive with petrol vehicles. The models affected were the 10-14 cwt chassis and the 18-22 cwt chassis, and they were hoping to see a five-fold increase in sales. Sales of their industrial electric truck had trebled between 1947 and 1948. All of their road vehicles were sold through the motor trade, in order to achieve a good standard of after-sales service.

In 1949, they offered 25 standard bodies for their chassis, including a mobile canteen or ice cream parlour, which they exhibited at the Dairy Show that year. The vehicle had a top speed of 16 mph, and a range of 28 miles, based on eight stops per mile. Production of 4-wheeled battery electrics ceased in 1950, although the company continued to manufacture the 3-wheeled Brush Pony milk float and their range of industrial trucks. They maintained enough spare parts to allow them to service 4-wheeled vehicles for a further 10 years and sold the remainder to Hindle, Smart and Co of Manchester, who made Helecs milk floats.

In 1972, Hawker Siddeley bought a 50 per cent share in Crompton Leyland Electricars Ltd (CLE), from British Leyland. CLE was the manufacturer of Morrison-Electricar milk floats, and at this point Hawker Siddeley owned Brush, RA Lister & Company, based in Dursley and Brook Victor Electric Vehicles based in Huddersfield, all of which were producing electric vehicles. In order to rationalise their operations, construction of Brush industrial trucks was transferred to the Morrison-Electricar factory in Tredegar. Although most of the vehicles involved were industrial trucks, the 3-wheeled Brush Pony milk float was also included, and a number of these were subsequently manufactured at Tredegar. Also included was the SD tractor, which was still selling well, and included a drive unit which had originally been designed for Brush by Morrisons in 1940.

=== Preservation ===
An early Brush Pony 3-wheeled milk float, formerly operated by United Dairies and dating from 1947, is on display at the National Motor Museum, Beaulieu. A Brush 10/14 cwt Mark II bread van, also dating from 1947, and formerly owned by the Co-operative Wholesale Society, can be seen at The Transport Museum, Wythall. It was displayed at the East Anglia Transport Museum from around 1973, and then moved to a collection of battery-electric vehicles at Blandford, Dorset in 1983. When that collection was sold in 1987, it was given to Wythall, and has yet to be restored. The Ipswich Transport Museum has a Brush Pony electric laundry van dating from 1967 in their collection.

The National Transport Museum of Ireland at Howth has a Brush 2-ton electric lorry in its collection. It was supplied to Dartry Limited, a laundry company based in Dublin, in 1947 as a chassis with bodbywork built locally by Dublin Vehicle Builders of Summerhill. It was used to transfer laundry between Dartry's branches, and to service a number of large hotels in Dublin city centre until their decline in the 1970s. It carried the registration number ZH 2511, and was finally withdrawn from service in 1981, around one year before Dartry ceased trading.

== Preserved aircraft ==
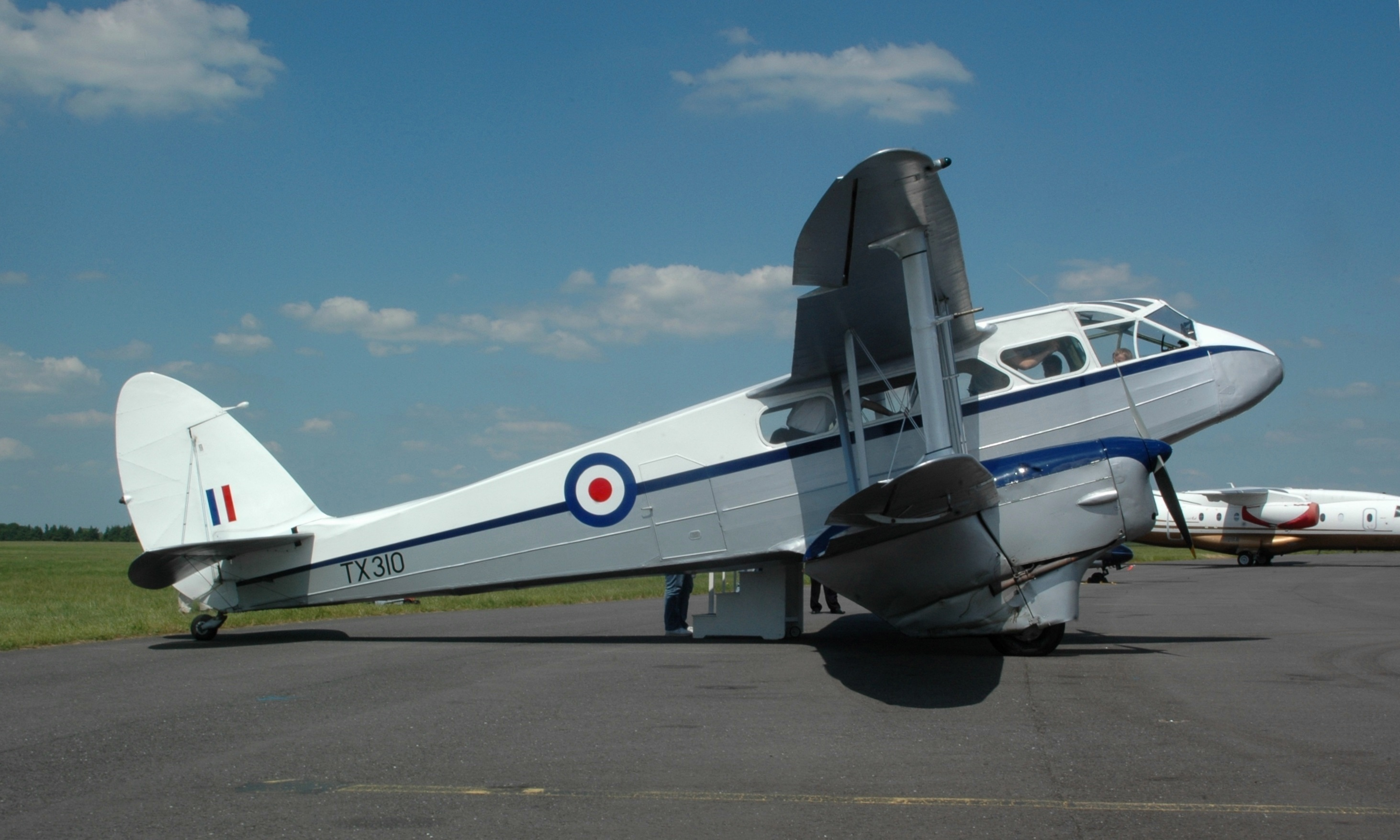
de Havilland DH.89 Dominie G-AIDL

A de Havilland Dominie DH.89 that Brush built in 1946 for the RAF is preserved at Tangmere Military Aviation Museum on the West Sussex coast.

== Other relics ==
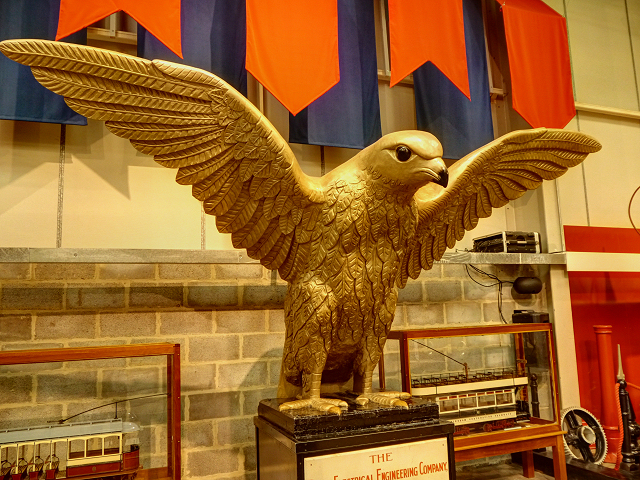
The Brush Falcon displayed at the National Tramway Museum

The large statue of a falcon from Brush's Loughborough works is now displayed in the exhibition hall at the National Tramway Museum in Crich, Derbyshire.

== See also ==
- Associated British Oil Engine Company
- Brush-Barclay
- Brush Transformers
