= Shoulder belt =

Shoulder belt may refer to:

- Shoulder harness, a seat belt
- Shoulder belt (military), belt worn over the right shoulder, across the body
- Bandolier, pocketed belt hold individual bullets or belts of ammunition
- Sash, band worn around the waist or over the shoulder or hips and usually tied
- Baldric, belt worn over one shoulder to carry a weapon or other implement

== See also ==
- Cross belt (disambiguation)
