= Sorter (logistics) =

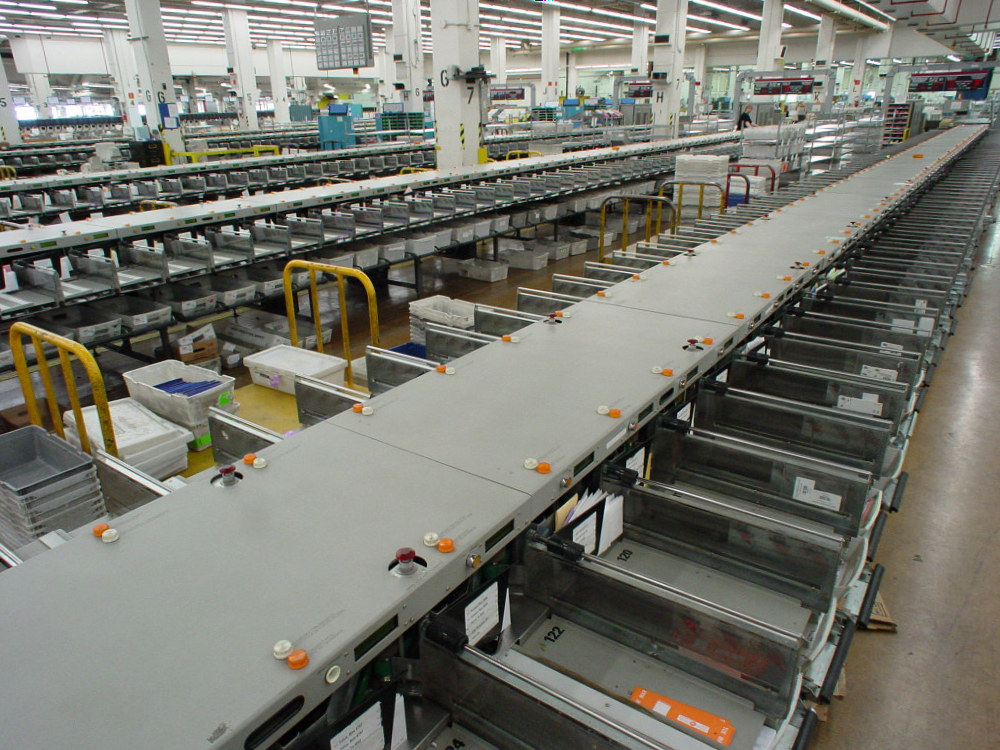
Mail sorter conveyor

In logistics, a sorter is a system which performs sortation of products (goods, luggage, mail, etc.) according to their destinations.

A common type of sorter is a conveyor-based system. While they may be based on other conveyor systems, usually sorters are unique types of conveyors.

Sortation is the process of identifying items on a conveyor system, and diverting them to specific destinations. Sorters are applied to different applications depending upon the product and the requested rate.

== Common elements of sorters ==
A feeder system whose sole purpose to feed the products into the sorter in proper orientation and with proper spacing, so that the sorter could operate correctly.

Another common element are receptacles which receive the products as they leave the sorter towards a proper destination. Receptacles may be as simple as chutes, or gravity conveyors, or powered conveyors.

== Sorter types ==
There is a number of typical sorter designs.

- Cross belt sorter
- Paddle sorter
- Pop-up transfer sorter
  - Lineshaft pop-up wheel sorter
  - Pop-up steerable roller sorter
- Pusher or puller sorter
- Parcel Singulator
- Line Sorter
- Shoe sorter
- Slide tray sorter
- Split tray sorter (bomb-bay sorter)
- Tilt tray sorter
