= Simon Peckham =

British businessman (born 1962)

- Born: Simon Antony Peckham; 13 August 1962 (age 63)
- Education: Dame Allan's School
- Occupation: Businessman
- Years active: 1983–present
- Title: CEO, Melrose plc
- Term: 2012–2024
- Successor: Peter Dilnot
- Children: 2

Simon Antony Peckham (born 13 August 1962) is a British businessman. He was the chief executive (CEO) of Melrose plc (between 2012–2024), a British investment company specialising in the acquisition and performance improvement of underperforming businesses. In 2014, he was the highest paid FTSE-100 CEO, earning £31 million worth of Melrose shares as an incentive scheme matured.

== Early life ==
Peckham's father was HR director of a printing firm, and his mother a nurse and then a probation officer. He has a brother. He went to Dame Allan's School, Newcastle upon Tyne and read law at Newcastle University.

== Career ==
Peckham qualified as a solicitor in 1986. He practiced at Clifford Chance.

He joined Wassall plc in 1990 and became corporate development director in 1999.

From October 2000 to May 2003, he worked for the equity finance division of The Royal Bank of Scotland.

=== Melrose ===
Peckham is one of the founders of Melrose, and was chief operating officer and secretary from 2003. He had previously worked with fellow founders Roper and Miller at Wassall.

Peckham has been Melrose CEO since 9 May 2012, and CEO of Elster Group since 24 August 2012. In 2014, Peckham was the highest-paid FTSE-100 CEO, earning £31 million, this was due to the maturing of a five year share incentive scheme paid out to the three founders of Melrose.

Melrose’s £8bn purchase of GKN in 2018 was the biggest hostile takeover in the City of London since Kraft’s successful hostile takeover of Cadbury in 2009 and triggered a backlash from certain politicians and trade unions over fears of cuts to UK jobs and investment.

== Personal life ==
Peckham is married and has two daughters.
