= Raymond Brookes, Baron Brookes =

The Right Honourable The Lord Brookes

Member of the House of Lords
- Lord Temporal
- Life peerage 14 January 1976 – 31 July 2002

Personal details
- Born: 10 April 1909
- Died: 31 July 2002 (aged 93)

Raymond Percival Brookes, Baron Brookes (10 April 1909 – 31 July 2002) was a British industrialist.

Brookes became the Managing Director of GKN in 1964 and the group's Chairman and Chief Executive in 1965. He retired in 1974 and was made GKN's Life President.

Brookes was knighted in 1971. On 14 January 1976, he was created a life peer, as Baron Brookes, of West Bromwich in the County of West Midlands. He sat as a Conservative until 1990, when he left the Conservative Party in protest against the removal of Margaret Thatcher. He then sat as a crossbencher.

He sat on the Board of Governors of the University of Birmingham from 1966 until 1975.

== Coat of arms ==
Coat of arms of Raymond Brookes, Baron Brookes

Crest
A demi-bear rampant Proper beside and resting its sinister paw on an anvil Sable.
Escutcheon
Or on a pale Sable between in chief two crosses crosslet Gules a sword the point upwards and enfiling a Stafford knot the blade charged above with guard with a sun in splendour over all Or.
Supporters
Dexter a dragon Sable armed Gules sinister a figure habited as Vulcan standing in front of an anvil resting his exterior hand on a hammer all Proper.
Motto
Ignis Indurat Animum
