= GKN =

British multinational automotive and aerospace company

GKN Ltd
- Type: limited company
- Industry: Automotive; Aerospace
- Predecessor: John Lysaght and Co.
- Founded: 1759; 267 years ago (Dowlais, Wales)
- Headquarters: Redditch, England, UK
- Key people: Michael Turner, CBE; (Chairman); Nigel Stein; (Chief executive officer)
- Products: Vehicle and aircraft components
- Revenue: £9,671 million (2017)
- Operating income: £699 million (2017)
- Net income: £509 million (2017)
- Owner: Melrose Industries
- Number of employees: 58,000 (2017)
- Divisions: GKN Aerospace, GKN Land Systems
- Website: www.gknaerospace.com

GKN Ltd is a British multinational automotive and aerospace components business headquartered in Redditch, England. It was a long-running business known for many decades as Guest, Keen and Nettlefolds. It can trace its origins back to 1759 and the birth of the Industrial Revolution. In 2018, GKN plc was acquired by Melrose Industries plc in a hostile takeover. Melrose divested GKN Automotive and GKN Powder Metallurgy in 2023 and listed them as Dowlais Group on the London Stock Exchange. GKN Aerospace continues to be owned by Melrose plc.

Throughout the majority of the twentieth century, though steel production remained the core of GKN it branched into tooling and component manufacturing. It was deeply affected by government policies during the latter half of the century, during which Britain's steel industry was subject to multiple nationalisation and privatisation efforts. During the 1980s, GKN Steel reduced its presence in the steel sector, selling off or shutting down its works.

GKN Steel renamed itself GKN during 1986 to indicate its shift away from steel production. Business activities were re-orientated around the aerospace, automotive and industrial services markets. In 1994, GKN purchased Westland Aircraft. The company later organised a joint venture of Westland's helicopter interests with Agusta to form AgustaWestland and its sale to Italian defense firm Finmeccanica. During November 1995, Dana Corporation purchased GKN's axle group; the two firms continued to operate joint ventures in the field for many years.

During the early 2000s, it took over Tochigi Fuji Sangyo K.K, a Japanese manufacturer of differentials and driveline torque systems. During December 2011, GKN Aerospace Engineering services division was sold to product engineering firm Quest Global. In 2012, GKN acquired the Swedish aerospace engine specialist Volvo Aero. During 2018, Melrose Industries acquired GKN in an £8.1 billion deal.

== Name ==
The company's name is the initials of three early figures in its history: John Guest, Arthur Keen, and Joseph Henry Nettlefold. All three were key figures in the field of iron and steel during the Industrial Revolution. Ivor Guest sold the Dowlais Iron Company in Wales to Arthur Keen and Windsor Richards of Birmingham's Patent Nut and Bolt Company in June 1900.

They combined the two businesses and formed Guest, Keen & Co. Limited on 1 November 1900. A little over twelve months later, Guest Keen & Co bought and amalgamated Nettlefolds Limited into their new combine giving it the style Guest, Keen and Nettlefolds Limited.

== History ==
=== 1759 to 1900 ===
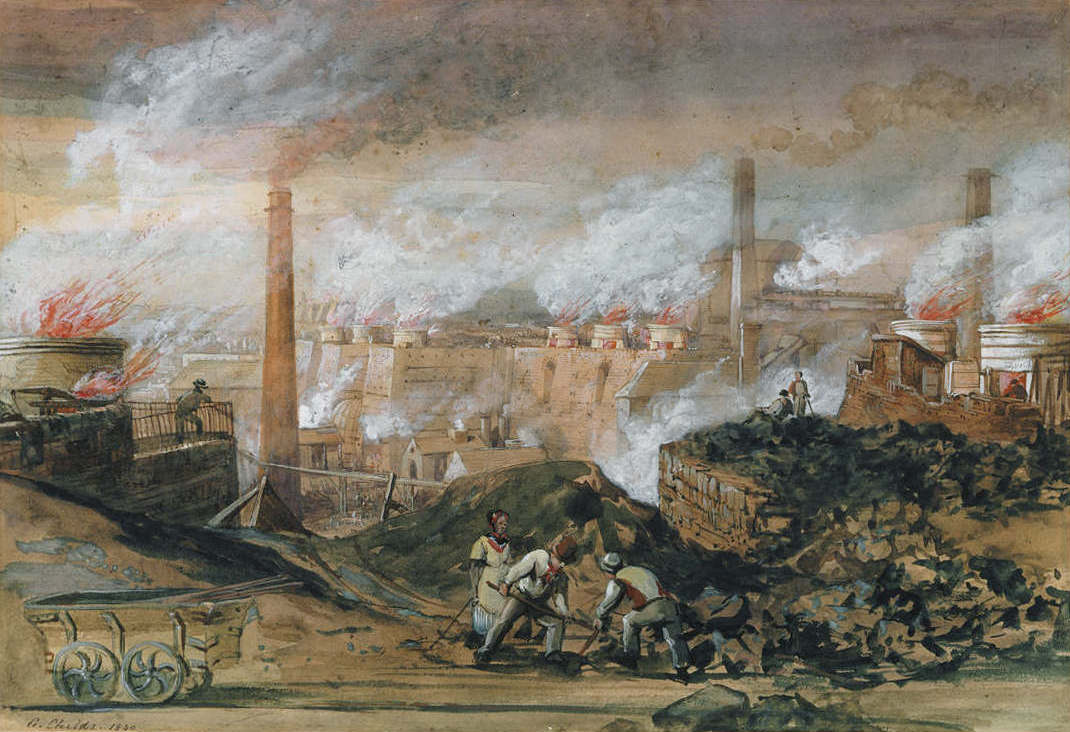
Dowlais Ironworks by George Childs (1840)

The origins of GKN lie in the founding of the Dowlais Ironworks in the village of Dowlais, Merthyr Tydfil, Wales, by Thomas Lewis and Isaac Wilkinson. John Guest was appointed manager of the works in 1767, having moved from Broseley. In 1786, Guest was succeeded by his son, Thomas Guest, who formed the Dowlais Iron Company with his son-in-law William Taitt. Guest introduced many innovations and the works prospered.

Under Guest's leadership, alongside his manager John Evans, and after his death in 1852 that of his wife Lady Charlotte Guest, the Dowlais Ironworks gained the reputation of being "one of the World's great industrial concerns". Though the Bessemer process was licensed in 1856, nine years of detailed planning and project management were needed before the first steel was produced. The company thrived with its new cost-effective production methods, forming alliances with the Consett Iron Company and Krupp. By 1857, G.T. Clark and William Menelaus, his manager, had constructed the "Goat Mill", the world's most powerful rolling mill.

By the mid-1860s, Clark's reforms had borne fruit in renewed profitability. Clark delegated day-to-day management to Menelaus, his trusteeship terminating in 1864 when ownership passed to Sir Ivor Guest. Clark continued to direct policy, building a new plant at the docks at Cardiff and vetoing a joint-stock company. He formally retired in 1897.

=== 1900 to 1966 ===
On 9 July 1900, the Dowlais Iron Company and Arthur Keen's Patent Nut and Bolt Company merged to form Guest, Keen & Co. Ltd.

Nettlefolds Limited, a leading manufacturer of fasteners, established in Smethwick, West Midlands in 1854, was acquired in 1902, leading to the change of name to Guest, Keen and Nettlefolds (GKN).

In 1920 John Lysaght and Co. was acquired.

==== Guest Keen Baldwins ====
Steel production remained at the core of the company, but under increasing profit margin pressure. In 1930, the company combined its steel production business with that of rival Baldwins to form Guest Keen Baldwins, which now held:

- Baldwins: Coke ovens at Margam; Blast-furnaces and steel melting shop at Margam; steel works and rolling mills at Port Talbot; blast-furnaces at Briton Ferry; lime stone quarry at Cornelly
- GKN: Dowlais Iron and Steel Works; Cardiff Iron and Steel Works; coke ovens at Cwmbran; limestone and silica quarries

In 1935, the company demolished the Cardiff works to construct a new production facility on the same site, funded by an issue of debentures. Due to a resultant global shortage of pig iron, in 1937, the company fired-up the single remaining blast furnace at Dowlais.

During the Second World War, all of the sites were heavily bombed by Nazi Germany's Luftwaffe, and the required investment meant that all of these assets were nationalised as part of the Iron and Steel Act 1949, resultantly becoming part of the Iron and Steel Corporation of Great Britain.

GKN were still highly reliant on the supply of good quality steel thus, in 1954, the business negotiated from the asset realisation company the repurchase of key assets from ISC, which were renamed Guest Keen Iron and Steel Co. In 1961, the company's name was changed again to GKN Steel Company.

==== Fasteners ====
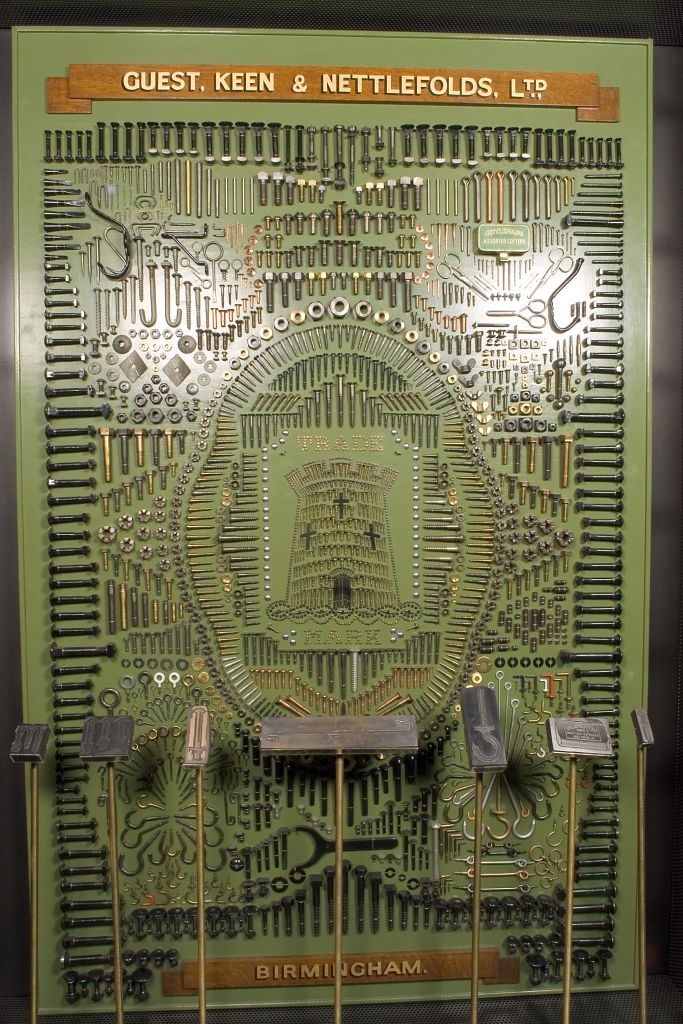
Display showing products of Guest Keen & Nettlefolds Ltd. in decorative form

These mergers heralded half a century in which GKN became a major manufacturer of screws, nuts, bolts and other fasteners. The company reflected the vertical integration fashionable at the time embracing activities from coal and ore extraction, and iron and steel making to manufacturing finished goods.

==== Crankshafts ====
After the First World War, it became apparent that Britain was likely to follow France and the United States in developing a large scale automotive industry. During 1919, GKN acquired another fastener manufacturer, F. W. Cotterill Ltd. Cotterill owned a subsidiary named J. W. Garrington, which specialised in forgings; the forgings produced at the Garrington Darlaston plant, later supplemented by a large plant at Bromsgrove, enabled GKN to become a major supplier of crankshafts, connecting rods, half-shafts and numerous smaller forged components to the UK auto-industry, which had a period of massive expansion during the interwar period and beyond.

==== Pressed steel wheels ====
Another company, eventually acquired by GKN, was founded by another steel manufacturing entrepreneur, Joseph Sankey. After training as a mechanical engineer in the late 19th century, Sankey founding a company that became a major producer of tea trays. A pioneering motorist, Sankey became friends with figures such as Herbert Austin, and was also a supplier of sheet steel components to the nascent British car industry. Because the wooden wheels on early cars had a tendency to disintegrate after hitting roadside kerbs, Sankey developed a pioneering pressed-steel wheel. Production started in 1908, with customers including Austin Motor Company and, later, William Morris. In addition to Sankey's original factory at Bilston, a new plant was established near Wellington, Shropshire, which was devoted to wheel production and known as GKN Sankey.

Meanwhile, by 1914, GKN's customers for sheet-steel vehicle bodies had also come to include Austin, along with Daimler, Humber, Rover, Star and Argyll.

After John Lysaght acquired Joseph Sankey and Sons Ltd, GKN purchased both companies, in 1920.

By the 1960s, GKN was manufacturing many other kinds of automotive components, including chassis for the Triumph Herald and its derivatives. The company also developed the GKN FV432 armoured personnel carrier. By 1969, the highly automated GKN Wheels Wellington plant was producing over 5½ million wheels per year, with a maximum rate of approximately 30,000 units per day.

==== Nationalisation of steel ====
The postwar government nationalised the steel industry under Iron and Steel Corporation of Great Britain. The act of parliament of 1949 took effect in February 1951.

In 1951, a new subsidiary Blade Research & Development (BRD) was formed at Aldridge, Staffordshire, to produce aero-engine turbine blades. Following a fall in demand for turbine blades in the late 1950s, the BRD factory switched to producing constant-velocity joints and driveshafts for vehicles.

In 1953, Britain's steel industry was de-nationalised by a new government; this policy only lasted for 14 years before being reversed.

=== 1966 to 1991 ===
At the end of April 1965, the recently elected Labour government published a White Paper proposing the nationalisation of 90 per cent, by output, of Britain's steel industry. GKN Steel was transferred to public ownership at the end of July 1967.

==== Driveline ====
Beginning a programme of diversification into the automotive field in 1966 GKN bought BRD's much larger competitor, Birfield Ltd, which held the great bulk of the British market for CVJs, constant velocity joints, and was a company that since 1938 had incorporated both the Sheffield based Laycock Engineering later best known as a postwar overdrive manufacturer, and Hardy Spicer Limited of Birmingham, England, also a manufacturer of constant-velocity joints. Historically, such joints had few applications, even following the improved design proposed by Alfred H. Rzeppa in 1936. However, in 1959, Alec Issigonis had developed the revolutionary Mini motor car that relied on the Hardy Spicer joints for its front wheel drive technology. The massive expansion in the exploitation of front wheel drive in the 1970s and 1980s led to the acquisition of other similar businesses and a 43% share of the world market by 2002.

On the death of founder Tony Vandervell in 1967, GKN acquired the lucrative Maidenhead-based Vandervell bearing manufacturer that was at the time exporting more than 50% of its output to overseas vehicle manufacturers. This was part of a larger trend for GKN that during this period, under its Managing Director Raymond Brookes, was working to reduce its dependence on UK auto-maker customers at a time when the domestic industry was seen to be stumbling, in response to bewildering "Government interference and fiscal short-sightedness", with British new car registrations in the first four months of 1969 a massive 33% down on the corresponding period of the previous year.

As a result of the large number of mergers, Abram Games was commissioned to develop a new corporate identity in 1969 when the distinctive angular GKN symbol was created and the new company colours of blue and white introduced. In 1974, GKN acquired Kirkstall Forge Engineering, a manufacturer of truck axles in Leeds.

==== GKN Steel ====
By 1968, GKN Steel had recreated its downline business, and started to build its upline business through aggressive building of a steel stockholding business. In 1972, it acquired Firth Cleveland, a hot and cold rolled strip business with a downline in sintered products, reinforcement steels, wire fasteners and garage equipment. In 1973, GKN Steel exchanged the remaining assets at Dowlais along with £30 million in cash to the nationalised British Steel Corporation, in return for the previously nationalised Brymbo Steelworks. After acquiring steel stockholding competitor Miles Druce and Co, by 1974, the company was in possession of a full integrated steel production and manufacturing business.

By the late 1980s, in the face of extensive competition from Japanese firms in both the axle and constant velocity joint business, GKN Steel decided to start selling off its steel and fasteners businesses. By 1991, the firm had disposed of all of the assets within these two business lines. GKN Steel's withdrawal coincidence with the wider closure of multiple steelworks and heavy industries across Britain, which caused considerable social disruption in some areas at the time, thus becoming a topic of political debate. In 1989, GKN Steel's factory at Bilston, in the West Midlands, was permanently closed and subsequently demolished.

=== 1990s ===
Having disposed of its steel production asset, the company renamed itself GKN in 1986. The firm focused on military vehicles, aerospace and industrial services. During the 1990s, GKN completed a series of large acquisitions and industrial consolidations. During 1994, the firm acquired the helicopter manufacturing business of Westland Aircraft. In 1998, GKN's armoured vehicle business was sold to Alvis plc; this division was subsequently incorporated into Alvis Vickers Ltd.

During November 1995, associate Dana Corporation purchased GKN's axle group; at that time, GKN held 34% of the world market for constant velocity joints. Around this same time period, GKN acquired larger shares of its other driveline joint ventures with Dana in Brazil, Argentina and Colombia. From the late 1990s, the company built up a major global business in powder metallurgy, which operates as the GKN Powdered Metallurgy group.

During early 1998, GKN and Italian aerospace company Finmeccanica commenced discussions on the topic of merging their helicopter operations; French aerospace conglomerate Aérospatiale had also reportedly made its own approaches around this time.

=== 2000s ===
In July 2000, GKN and Finmeccanica announced an agreement to merge their respective helicopter subsidiaries, Westland and Agusta respectively, to form AgustaWestland. On 20 May 2004, GKN confirmed that it was holding discussions to sell its 50% shareholding in AgustaWestland to Finmeccanica. The sale of this stake in exchange for £1 billion ($1.79 billion) from Finmeccanica was finalised later that year.

In 2002, GKN acquired a significant stake in – and by 2004 took over the whole concern of – the Japanese manufacturer of differentials and driveline torque systems Tochigi Fuji Sangyo K.K, based in Tochigi, Tochigi. GKN went on to acquire Monitor Aerospace Corp in Amityville, New York and Precision Machining in Wellington, Kansas in 2006, part of the Airbus plant at Filton near Bristol for £150 million in 2008 and all of Getrag's axle business and axle manufacturing facilities in 2011.

=== 2010s ===
During December 2011, GKN Aerospace Engineering services division was acquired by product engineering firm Quest Global. The sale was accompanied by an agreement for QuestGlobal to provide engineering resources to GKN Aerospace; this cooperation was presented as a long-term strategy.

In July 2012, GKN agreed to acquire the Swedish aerospace components manufacturer Volvo Aero from AB Volvo for £633 million (US$986 million). The takeover was seen as presenting good opportunities for the expansion of Volvo Aero's range of engine component production range via GKN's experience in producing aerostructures. In October 2015, GKN acquired Dutch aerospace company Fokker Technologies through a €706 million deal. GKN Aerospace chief Kevin Cummings stated that the Fokker purchase enhances GKN's global manufacturing footprint and brought new technology to the company.

Throughout the 2010s, there was strong demand for GKN's aerostructures; earlier, the company had secured manufacturing contracts to produce elements of the Boeing 787, Airbus A350 XWB, Airbus A400M Atlas, and Lockheed Martin F-35 Lightning II, in addition to numerous other aircraft. During early 2011, it was announced that GKN and EADS would cooperate on developing radical additive layer manufacturing technology for aerospace purposes. That same year, the Honda Aircraft Company picked GKN to produce the whole composite fuselage of its Honda HA-420 HondaJet at the latter's facility in Alabama. In late 2012, it opened a new composite manufacturing facility in Mexicali, Mexico. During the same year, GKN was contracted to provide fuselage components for the Bell 525 Relentless helicopter.

During January 2018, Melrose Industries announced plans to purchase GKN and its restructuring thereafter; that same month, GKN's management rejected the initial bid made. In March 2018, Melrose submitted a revised £8.1 billion bid for the company; this bid was controversial and was subject to criticism, being branded by some press agencies as a hostile takeover. Melrose's offer received shareholder support and was accepted. Following a formal review of the purchase, including of various objections put forward by GKN workers and trade unions, the UK Government allowed the transaction to proceed in April 2018; Melrose agreed to comply with several national security measures.

Since the takeover by Melrose plc, the GKN legacy group of businesses were decentralised in a move toward maximizing profitable sales in favour of focusing on pure growth of sales numbers. By the end of 2019, GKN had been restructured into three core divisions: GKN Aerospace, GKN Automotive and GKN Powder Metallurgy.

=== 2020s ===
On 9 July 2021, 422 workers of GKN's factory in Florence, Italy were notified that the factory was to be closed the next Monday. The same day, the unions organized a demonstration in front of the factory, and then occupied it. A workers' collective, led by Dario Salvetti, was formed with the objective of taking a shareholding in the business.

In March 2023, Melrose announced that it would demerge GKN Automotive and GKN Powder Metallurgy as Dowlais Group. On 29 January 2025, it was announced that American Axle had made an offer worth US$1.4 billion to acquire Dowlais. The transaction was approved by the shareholders of American Axle on 15 July 2025 and by the shareholders of Dowlais Group on 22 July 2025. It was expected to complete during the fourth quarter of 2025.

==== Garden Grove chemical leak ====
In May 2026, a leak of methyl methacrylate at the GKN Aerospace plant in Garden Grove, California, forced the evacuation of over 50,000 residents in the immediate area due to the risk of the 34,000-US-gallon (130 kL) tank either spilling over or exploding.

== Operations ==
The company is organised as follows:

- GKN Aerospace
  - Aerostructures
  - EWIS Products
  - Engine Products
  - Propulsion Systems
- GKN Automotive
  - Driveshafts
  - Freight Services
  - Autostructures
  - Cylinder liners, Sheepbridge Stokes
  - Power Management
  - PowerTrain Systems & Services
  - Wheels and Structures
  - Stromag
- GKN Powder Metallurgy
  - Sinter Metals
  - Hoeganaes
  - Hydrogen Storage
