= Charles F. Brush =

American engineer (1849–1929)

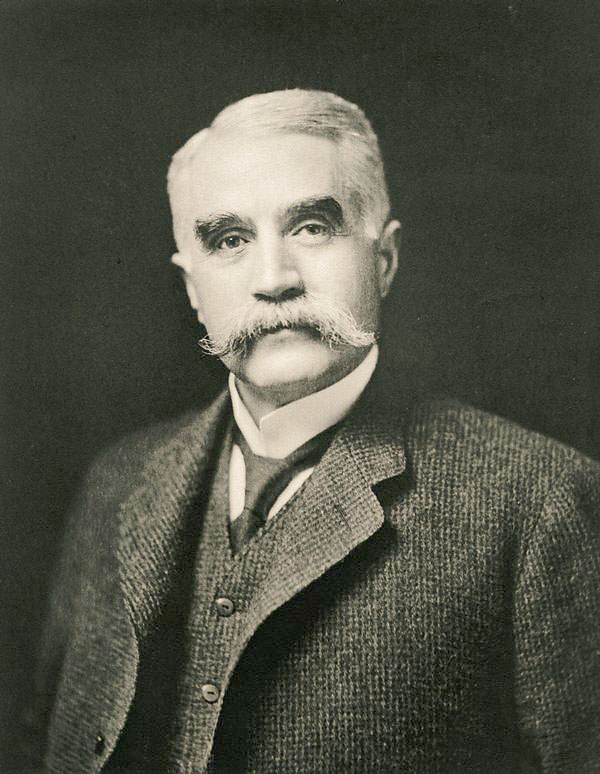
- Born: Charles Francis Brush; March 17, 1849; Euclid, Ohio, U.S.
- Died: June 15, 1929 (aged 80); Cleveland, Ohio, U.S.
- Resting place: Lake View Cemetery, Cleveland, Ohio; 41.510306°N 81.589194°W
- Education: University of Michigan; Case Western Reserve University
- Known for: Arc lamp
- Awards: Edison Medal (1913); Rumford Prize; French Legion of Honor; Franklin Medal

Signature
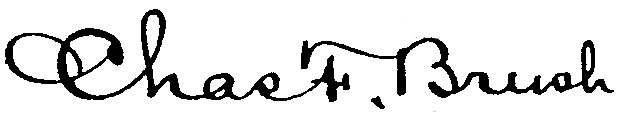

Charles Francis Brush (March 17, 1849 – June 15, 1929) was an American engineer, inventor, entrepreneur, and philanthropist.

== Biography ==
Brush was born in Euclid Township, Ohio, to Isaac Elbert Brush and Delia Williams Phillips. Isaac Brush was a distant cousin of Delia on the Phillips side. Through Delia he was a descendant of the Rev. George Phillips, who settled Watertown, Massachusetts, in 1630. Delia was also a descendant of Henry Wisner, member of the First and Second Continental Congresses during the American Revolution, as well as Thomas Cornell (settler) and the Winthrop family.

Brush was raised on a farm about 10 miles from downtown Cleveland. He had a great interest in science, particularly with Humphry Davy's experiments with the arc light; he tinkered with and built simple electrical devices such as a static electricity machine at age 12, experimenting in a workshop on his parents' farm. Brush attended Central High School in Cleveland where he built his first arc light, and graduated there with honors in 1867. His high school commencement oration was on the "Conservation of Force". He received his college undergraduate education from the University of Michigan, where he studied mining engineering, graduating in 1869 (there were no majors—as there are today—in electrical engineering). At Michigan, Brush was a member of Delta Kappa Epsilon fraternity (Omicron chapter). Brush earned his PhD at Western Reserve (now Case Western Reserve University), graduating in 1880.

=== New dynamo design ===
In 1876 he secured the backing of the Wetting Supply Company in Cleveland to design his "dynamo" (an electrical generator) for powering arc lights. Brush began with the dynamo design of Zénobe Gramme but his final design was a marked divergence, retaining the ring armature idea that originated with Antonio Pacinotti. Brush remarked on his motivation for improving the generator in his U.S. patent 189,997: "The best forms of magneto-electric apparatus at present before the public are unnecessarily bulky, heavy, and expensive, and are more or less wasteful of mechanical power." After comparing it to the Gramme dynamo and other European entrants, the Franklin Institute of Philadelphia judged Brush's dynamo superior due to its simpler design and maintainability after completing tests in 1878.

Brush produced additional patents refining the design of his arc lights in the coming years and sold systems to several cities for public lighting, and even equipped Philadelphia's Wanamaker's Grand Depot with a system. His lights were easier to maintain, had automatic functions and burned twice as long as Yablochkov candles. His generators were reliable and automatically increased voltage with greater load while keeping current constant. By 1881, New York, Boston, Philadelphia, Baltimore, Montreal, Buffalo, San Francisco, Cleveland, and other cities had Brush arc light systems, producing public light well into the 20th century.

Arc lamp examples

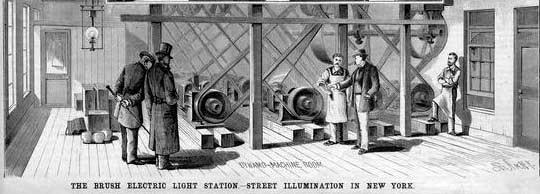
New York central power plant dynamos powered arc lamps for public lighting. Beginning operation in December 1880 at 133 West Twenty-Fifth Street, it powered a two-mile long circuit.

The San Francisco system was the first case of a utility selling electricity from a central plant to multiple customers via distribution lines. The California Electric Light Company (now PG&E) purchased two generators from Charles Brush's company in 1879 and soon opened a second plant with four additional generators. Service charges for light from sundown to midnight was US$10 per lamp per six day week. Brush's system was lighting Broadway two years before Edison's Pearl Street Station began lighting New York. By 1893 there were 1500 arc lights illuminating New York streets.

In 1879, the Anglo-American Brush Electric Light Corporation, using Brush's inventions, was formed in Lambeth, London, England. This company eventually moved to Loughborough, England and became Brush Electrical Engineering Company Limited.

In 1880, Brush established the Brush Electric Company in the United States and, though successful, faced stiff competition from the Thomson-Houston Electric Company, whose arc lights could be independently turned off, and by Edison, whose incandescent lights had a softer warm glow, did not flicker, and were less costly to maintain than arc lights. In 1882, the Brush Electric Company supplied generating equipment for a hydroelectric power plant at St. Anthony Falls in Minneapolis, among the first to generate electricity from water power in the United States. Thomson-Houston bought out Brush in 1889 and eventually merged to become part of General Electric in 1891. After selling his interests in Brush Electric, Brush never returned to the electric industry.

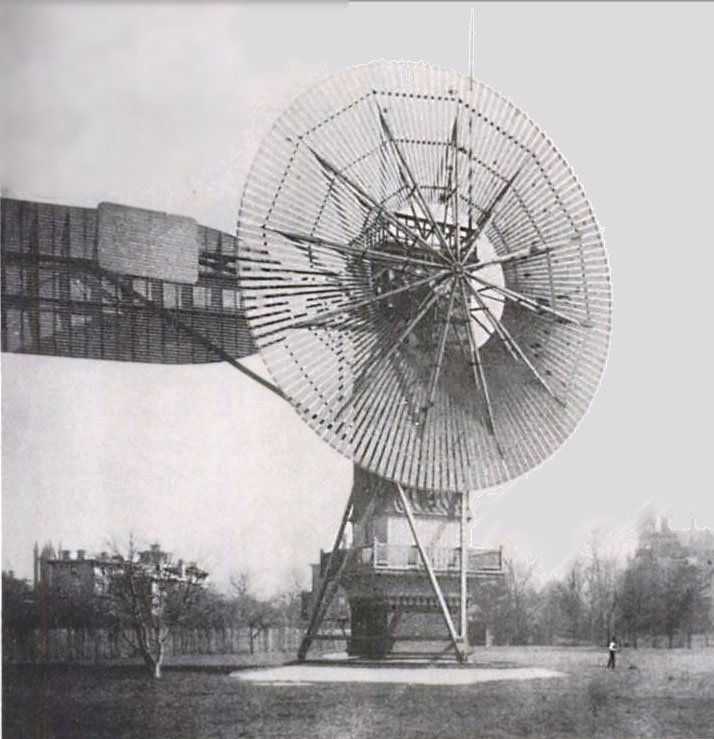
The world's first automatically operated wind turbine was built in 1888 by Charles F. Brush. It had a 12 kW dynamo.

In 1884, Brush built a mansion on Euclid Avenue in Cleveland that showcased many of his inventions. There he raised his family and lived the remainder of his life. The basement housed Brush's private laboratory. In 1888, he powered the mansion with the world's first automatically operated wind turbine generator which charged the home's 12 batteries. It was the first home in Cleveland to have electricity. Over its 20-year life, the turbine never failed to keep the home continuously powered. In 1926, Brush pioneered the first piezo-electric featherweight stylus.

In 1898, Brush claimed to have discovered a new gas, which he named "etherion". This gas had remarkable properties, being 10,000 times lighter than hydrogen and conducting heat 20 times faster than it. In 1900, Marian Smoluchowski identified the gas as water vapor.

Between 1910 and 1929 he wrote several papers on his version of a kinetic theory of gravitation, based on some sort of electromagnetic waves.

He died on June 15, 1929, in Cleveland, Ohio, and was interred at Lake View Cemetery there.

== Legacy ==
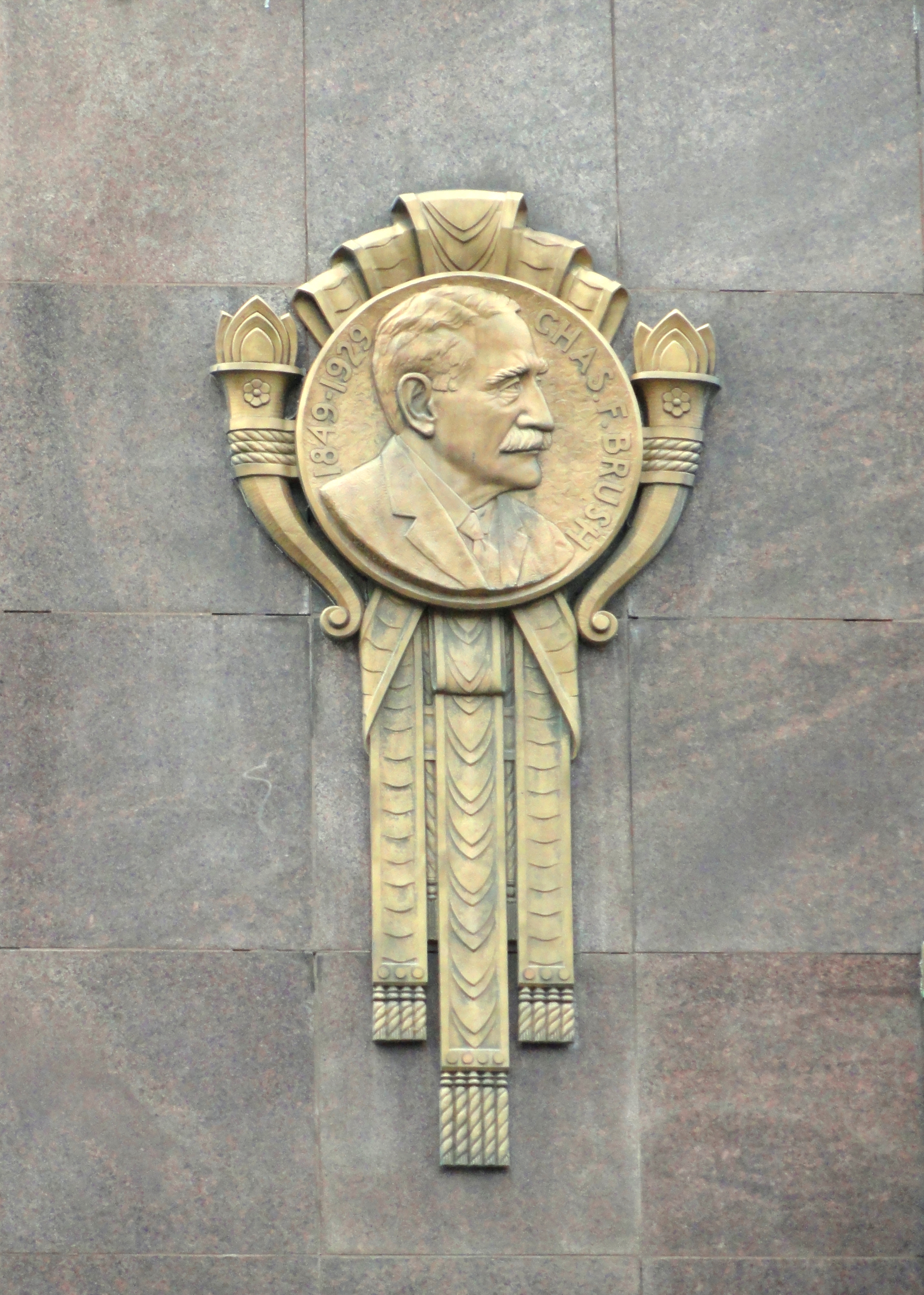
Medallion of Charles F. Brush that hangs outside the Cleveland Arcade on Euclid Avenue, Cleveland, Ohio

- Charles F. Brush High School in Lyndhurst, Ohio is named after Brush, whose sports teams and other groups are named the "Arcs", after Brush's lamp. They wear Brown and Gold.
- Charles F. Brush Preparatory High School in Dansha, Ethiopia opened in 2018, constructed by Brush alumni and the Tigray Development Association.
- Metro Parks, Serving Summit County's Furnace Run Metro Park in Richfield, Ohio, received a donation of land from the Family of Charles F. Brush. The donated tract is known as Brushwood.
- USS Brush (DD-745) 1943-1969 (then Taiwan's Hsiang Yang until scrapped in 1993) was named after Brush, sponsored by his great-granddaughter.

== Honors ==
- Rumford Prize of the American Academy of Arts and Sciences (1899)
- French Legion of Honor (1881)
- Elected Member of the American Philosophical Society (1910)
- Edison Medal (1913)
- Elected Member of the American Academy of Arts and Sciences (1917)
- Franklin Medal
- Fellow of the North British Academy of Arts

== Patents ==
- Generator (Magneto Electric Machine) 1877 U.S. patent 189,997
- Arc light (automatic control of spark gap) 1878 U.S. patent 203,411
- Arc light (double-carbon lamp regulation system) 1879 U.S. patent 219,208
- Arc light (Automatic shut off for Electric Lights or Motors) 1880 U.S. patent 234,456
- Arc light (improved regulator for the carbon arc) 1885 U.S. patent 312,184
- Patents granted to Charles F. Brush relating to electric machinery and apparatus, 1878-1894 available via Internet Archive
