= Cross belt sorter =

Sortation system consisting of a chain of conveyor belts

A cross-belt sorter is an advanced conveyor-based automated sortation system used in various industries to handle and direct items such as luggage, apparel, parcels, packages, and mail. This system uses a series of independently operated short conveyor belts mounted transversely along the main track, known as cross-belts that are organised in a loop, to sort items quickly and accurately to their designated destinations. Cross-belt sorters are widely utilised in logistics, e-commerce and postal services due to their high efficiency, throughput, and accuracy.

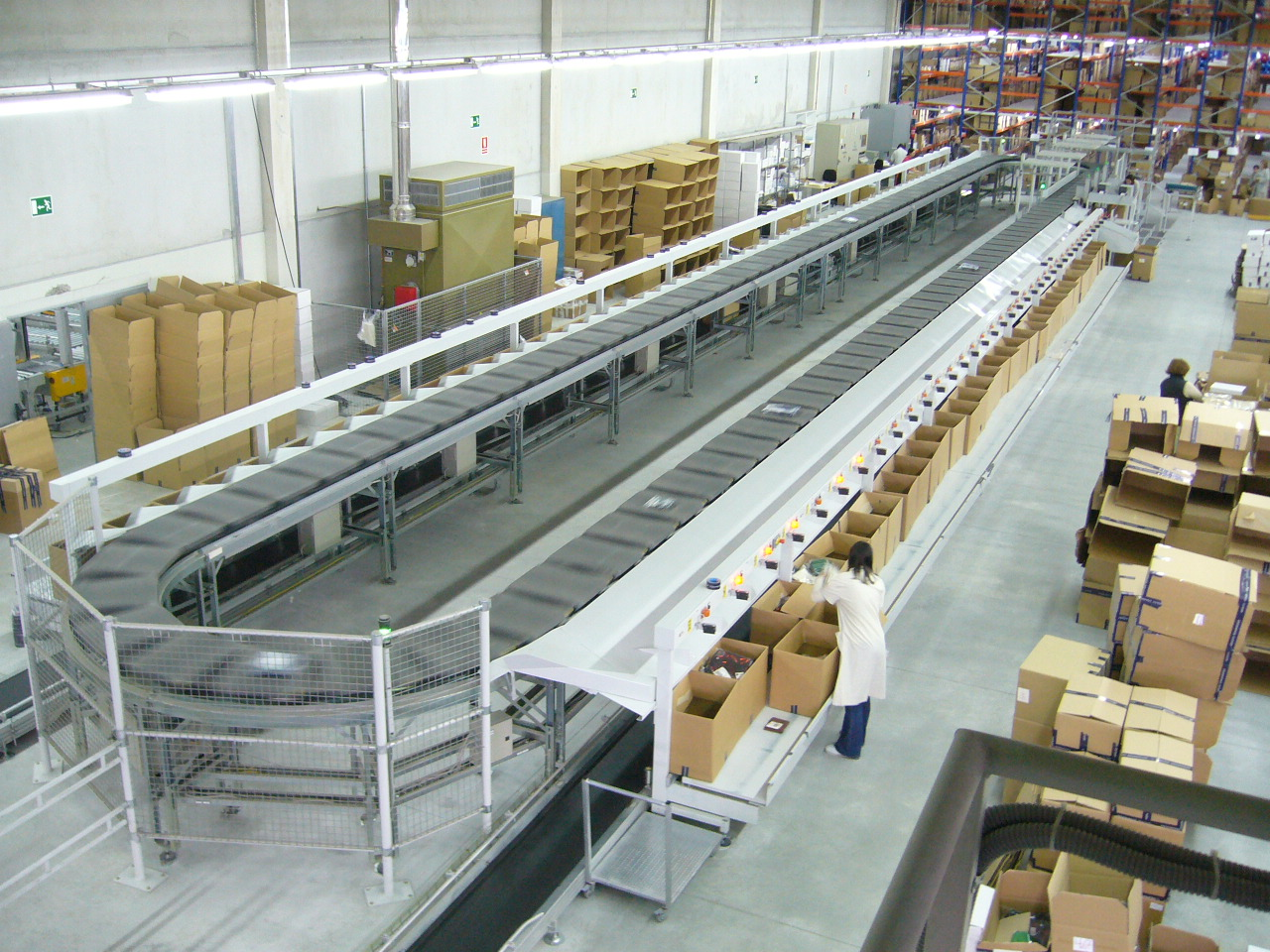
sorter

== Types of cross belt sorters ==
There are a variety of different cross-belt sorters—each industry and each cross-belt sorter manufacturer can have unique products. Nevertheless, the standard two are horizontal cross-belt sorters and vertical cross-belt sorters. In both cases, current generations employ linear induction motor technology—this means they are simpler to operate, maintain, and endure less mechanical wear over time.

=== Components and Operation ===
The main components of a cross-belt sorter include:

1. Induction Area: This is where items are introduced onto the sorter. Items are predominantly fed automatically from conveyor belts, or other feeding mechanisms, although as an exception, some are fed manually by an operator at low speeds.
2. Track: The track guides the trains along a predefined path. There are two main types of track (or rail) configuration; Horizontal or Vertical. Although referred to as a horizontal loop, this track can have inclined and decline sections to reach different heights, however, the track curves are usually on the horizontal plane and the closed loop can contain many turns. This sorter configuration also allows for recirculation – A term that refers to items that can remain on the sorter loop without needing to be ejected. This is useful should a discharge point not be available. A vertical loop has no horizontal track curves, and items are only transported in one direction and horizontal plane from one induction area. This configuration limits throughput compared to a horizontal sorter, but provides cross-belt sortation within a smaller area. As all items must be ejected before the cross-belt makes its return journey to the induct area, there is no recirculation on the sorter possible.
3. Train: A group of carriers is called a train. For redundancy, there are typically a number of trains joined end-to-end to form one continuous loop. If one train loses communication, the availability of the sorter is therefore kept.
4. Carrier: These wheeled units are joined to each other to form a train.
5. Cells: These are the individual conveyor belts mounted on top of a carrier. Each cross-belt cell has its own motor or actuation and can move items perpendicular to the direction of travel, either to the left or right, enabling the precise direction of items to specific slides, chutes or conveyors. A carrier can carry one or more cells.
6. Control System: A sophisticated control system, often integrated with sensors and software, manages the sorting process. It identifies each item, determines its destination, and activates the appropriate cross-belt at the right moment.
7. Discharge Points: This is where items are ejected from the sorter, typically for a specific destination. They can be bins, chutes, conveyor belts, or directly into transportation containers.

=== How It Works ===
The cross-belt sorter operates in several stages:

1. Induction: Items are fed typically at an angle of 30˚ or 45˚ onto the moving sorter through a series of conveyors that accelerate the item to the sorter speed. The cross-belt then activates and the item is inducted to the sorter cell at null relative speed. The inducted item can occupy one or more cells depending on its size, weight and carrier configuration
2. Scanning: Typically after induction, the item requires identification to know the correct discharge point on the sorter. This can involve OCR, barcode readers, RFID scanners, or other identification. Depending on application, this can also be performed before or during the induction
3. Sorting: As items travel along the track, the control system assigns each item to a discharge point depending on the scanning information. When the item reaches the designated discharge point, the cross-belt cell activates and moves the item to the appropriate chute or conveyor
4. Discharge: Sorted items are discharged into their respective bins, chutes, or conveyors. These can then be processed further or prepared for shipping

=== Technology ===
There are typically three main connections required to the cross-belt trains to enable operation. High-end cross-belt sorters adopt non-contact technology in favour of minimal maintenance. This means little or no wear occurs, providing a highly reliable system and reducing lifecycle cost, but results in a slightly higher capital cost to other technologies.

==== Means to propel the carriers ====
Linear synchronous motors (LSM) are used in high-end sorters as they require little maintenance, are non-contact and can provide accurate acceleration, deceleration or maintain a speed. Although speeds up to 3 m/s are reported, sorter speeds of up to 2.5 m/s are typically used for parcel applications to ensure no fly-outs of lighter items (Items becoming airborne during acceleration or transit). Additional LSM’s are typically added to a track for redundancy, therefore, should a LSM become inactive, there is sufficient propulsion provided by the remaining LSM’s to ensure no loss of performance.

Alternative contact solutions adopt motorised wheels that propel a flat plate under the sorter through friction.

==== Means to activate the Cells ====
Inductive power transfer (IPT) uses a magnetic field to transfer electrical energy without contact. Alternatively, a wheel with a motor on the carrier, generates power to the cells. An often cheaper but higher maintenance solution uses a Busbar system and brushes.

Contact types of activation rely on mechanical actuators to activate the cells, though typically the ejection point requires to be a fixed position resulting in less dynamic ejections and operates at lower speeds and throughputs.

==== Means to communicate with the control system ====
Industrial Wi-Fi is typically used as this provides non-contact communication that is not disrupted by dirt or debris. Alternative technologies include Infrared.

The sorter may also communicate with the control system using serial communication protocols, such as LIN bus, via mechanical brushes contacting a continuous bus bar tracking along the sorter path.

=== Advantages ===
Cross-belt sorters offer several advantages:

- Gentle Handling: The sorter does not rely on gravity to discharge items, such as a tilt-tray. This means ejection is better controlled and reliable.
- Chute density: Divert points can be closer together so increasing chute density, resulting in better space utilisation.
- Low operating costs: Depending on the technology used, low operating costs can be achieved through a combination of low maintenance and high energy efficiency.
- High throughput: Capable of sorting thousands of items per hour, cross-belt sorters significantly enhance throughput and efficiency. In addition, the throughput can be multiplied for horizontal sorters by adding additional virtual induction areas, similar to having a chain of sorters back-to-back. For instance, with 3 induct areas, each with a throughput of 12000 parcels per hour, it will equate as 36000 parcels per hour sorted (assuming all parcels leave the sorter before the next induction area).$Throughput = {Sorter Speed (Meters Per Hour) \times No. Of Cells Per Carrier \times Efficiency Factor}\over Carrier Pitch (Meters)$
- Accuracy: With precise control and advanced scanning technology, these systems achieve high accuracy in sorting. Some cross-belts can also dynamically adjust the ejection point to better fill a chute or based on size or weight characteristics
- Flexibility: Suitable for handling a wide range of item sizes, shapes, and weights, and tricky items such as polybags, making them versatile for various industries.
- Scalability: Modular designs allow for easy expansion and customization to meet growing operational demands.

=== Applications ===
Cross-belt sorters are employed in various sectors, including:

- E-commerce: To handle the high volume of orders and returns, ensuring timely delivery and efficient processing.
- Postal Services: For sorting mail and parcels quickly and accurately to improve delivery times.
- Retail Distribution: In distribution centres to sort products for shipment to stores or directly to customers.
- Airport Baggage Handling: For efficiently sorting and directing luggage to the appropriate flights or terminals.
