= Tilt tray sorter =

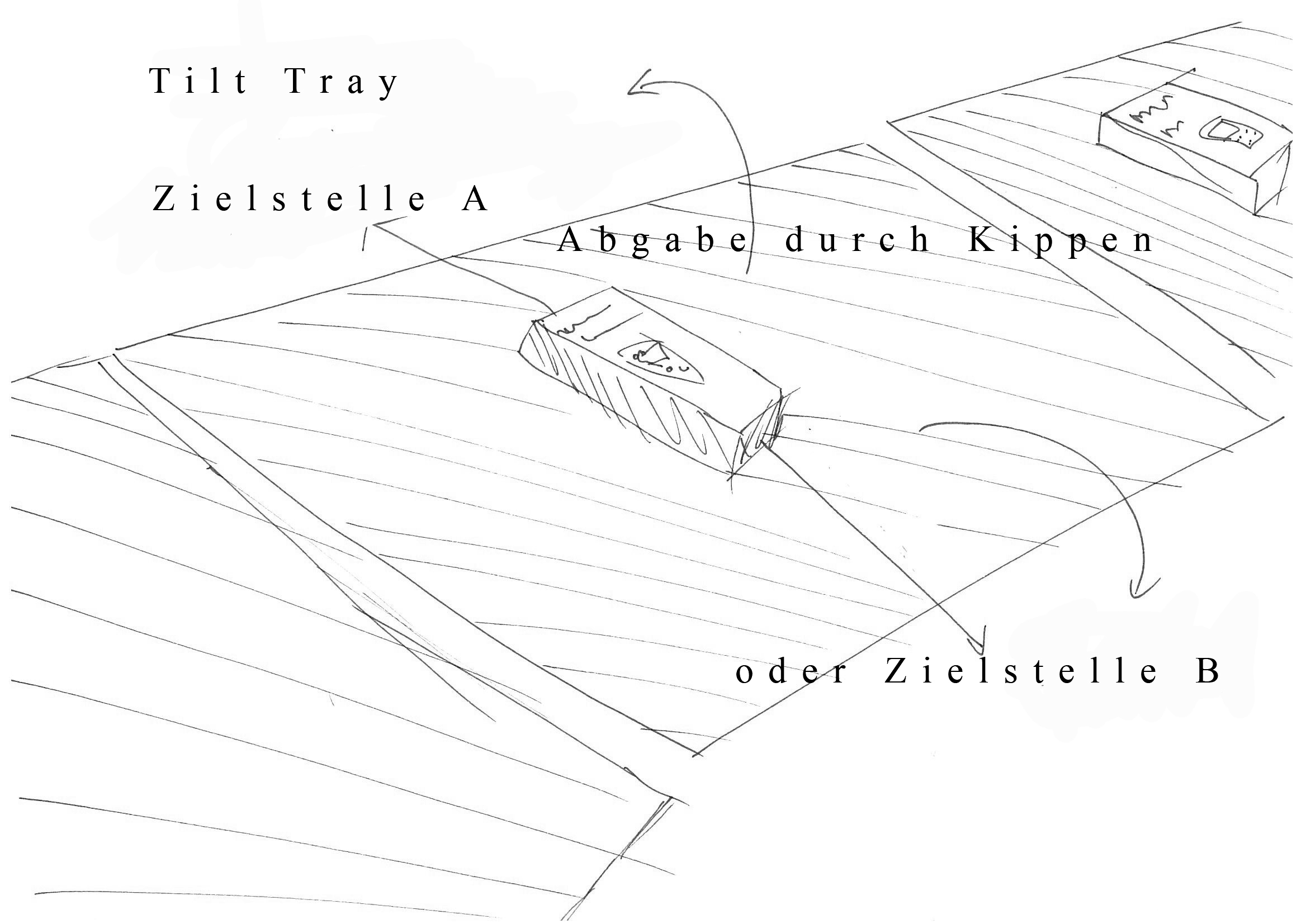
Drawing shows how the automatic tilt-tray sorter uses a simple mechanism to benefit from gravity to separate various products going around in a conveyor.

A tilt-tray sorter is a mechanical assembly similar to a conveyor belt but instead of a continuous belt, it consists of individual trays traveling in the same direction.

A tilt-tray sorter can be configured in an inline (AKA over/under) formation, or in a continuous-loop.

Items are loaded onto the passing trays at the front end of the sorter and travel towards a series of destinations on either side of the sorter. Items are loaded on to trays individually and their sort destination is determined in advance.

As the tray with an item approaches its destination the tray is tilted to slide the object into the chute. The empty tray will then return to the load section before it is loaded again with a new item.

A tilt-tray sorter is a continuous-loop sortation conveyor that uses a technique of tilting a tray at a chute to slide the object into the chute.
