= Melrose Industries =

British company

Melrose Industries plc
- Formerly: New Melrose Industries plc (September–November 2015)
- Type: Public limited company
- Traded as: LSE: MRO; FTSE 100 component
- Industry: Aerospace
- Founded: 2003
- Founder: Christopher Miller; David Roper; Simon Peckham
- Headquarters: Birmingham, England, UK
- Key people: Justin Dowley (Chairperson); Peter Dilnot (CEO)
- Revenue: ▲£3,589 million (2025)
- Operating income: ▲£600 million (2025)
- Net income: ▲£370 million (2025)
- Number of employees: 16,000 (2026)
- Subsidiaries: GKN Aerospace
- Website: melroseplc.net

Melrose Industries plc is a British aerospace manufacturing company based in Birmingham, England. It is the parent company of GKN Aerospace. The company's shares are listed on the London Stock Exchange as a constituent of the FTSE 100 Index.

Melrose Industries was founded in 2003 by David Roper, Christopher Miller and Simon Peckham. In terms of business practices, the company aimed to buy and turn around underperforming businesses. Melrose has acquired, and in some cases also sold numerous engineering companies, including Dynacast, McKechnie, FKI, Elster, Nortek, and GKN. Its acquisition techniques have allegedly included hostile takeover tactics; Melrose has also been publicly criticised for issuing high paying performance linked incentive schemes to its top executives. In 2023 Melrose Industries plc demerged GKN Automotive and GKN Powder Metallurgy from GKN as Dowlais Group, transforming itself to a focused aerospace business.

== History ==
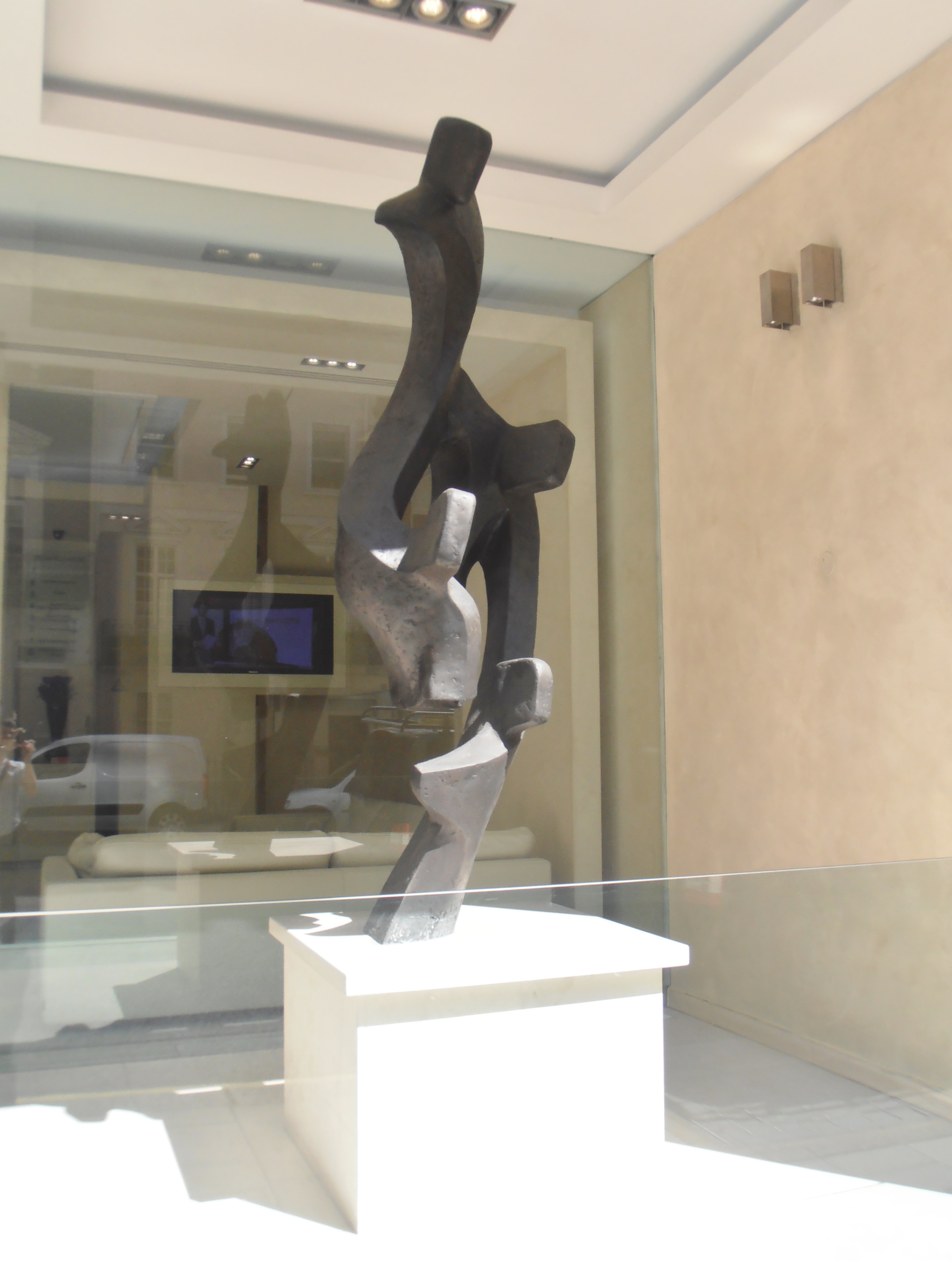
Sculpture at Melrose's head office at Leconfield House in Curzon Street, London

In 2003, Melrose Industries was launched on London's Alternative Investment Market with an initial market capitalisation of £10m; it had been established that same year by three individuals: David Roper, Christopher Miller and Simon Peckham. For many years, the three founders have been directly involved in managing the company; between 2003 and 2010, Melrose was headed by David Roper.

Melrose acquired Dynacast, a manufacturer of diecast parts and components, and McKechnie, an engineering group, in 2005; it divested both McKechnie Aerospace and McKechnie PSM in exchange for $855m two years later. In early 2008, it bought FKI, an engineering business that included the Brush Turbogenerators unit, in a £480m deal. The company opted to sell on Dynacast for $590m in 2011. During June 2012, Melrose sold McKechnie Plastic Components to Swedish firm Rosti for £30.7m.

During August 2012, it acquired Elster, a metering business, for $2.3bn. In July 2015, Melrose sold Elster to American engineering conglomerate Honeywell in a £3.3bn deal; of this windfall, £2bn was distributed to Melrose's investors while the remainder went to other corporate purposes, including debt reduction.

On 29 September 2015, Melrose Industries incorporated a new corporate structure. During the late 2010s, the company was reportedly subject to vigorous criticism over the generosity of its long-term bonus scheme, which paid out £167m to Melrose's four bosses over its performance in 2018, during which revenues and profits had both dramatically increased. Melrose has reportedly gained the backing of multiple leading market institutions, such as Schroders and Fidelity.

In July 2016, the company acquired Nortek, a ventilation equipment manufacturer, for £2.2 billion. By 2018, Nortek was reporting a 52 per cent increase in adjusted operating profits across the previous year, having met its original three-to-five-year targets for the company within 18 months.

During January 2018, Melrose Industries announced its plans to purchase GKN as well as the firm's restructuring thereafter; that same month, GKN's management rejected the initial bid made. In March 2018, Melrose submitted a revised £8.1 billion bid for the company; this bid was controversial and was subject to criticism, being branded by some press agencies as a hostile takeover. Melrose's offer received shareholder support and was accepted. Following a formal review of the purchase, including of various objections put forward by GKN workers and trade unions, the UK Government allowed the transaction to proceed in April 2018; Melrose agreed to comply with several national security measures.

In October 2019, Melrose Industries announced the appointment of Funmi Adegoke to its Board as an inaugural independent non-executive Director.

During 2020, David Roper, one of the Melrose's three original founders, was set to step down as executive vice-chairman and depart the firm.

In March 2023, Melrose Industries announced that it would demerge GKN Automotive and GKN Powder Metallurgy from GKN as Dowlais Group. In May, Melrose abandoned its 'buy, improve and sell' model, instead, the Company would focus on aerospace and then return cash to shareholders.

== Operations ==
Melrose's main subsidiaries are Brush Turbogenerators, GKN and Nortek.
