= List of schools in the London Borough of Lambeth =

This is a list of schools in the London Borough of Lambeth, England.

== State-funded schools ==
=== Primary schools ===
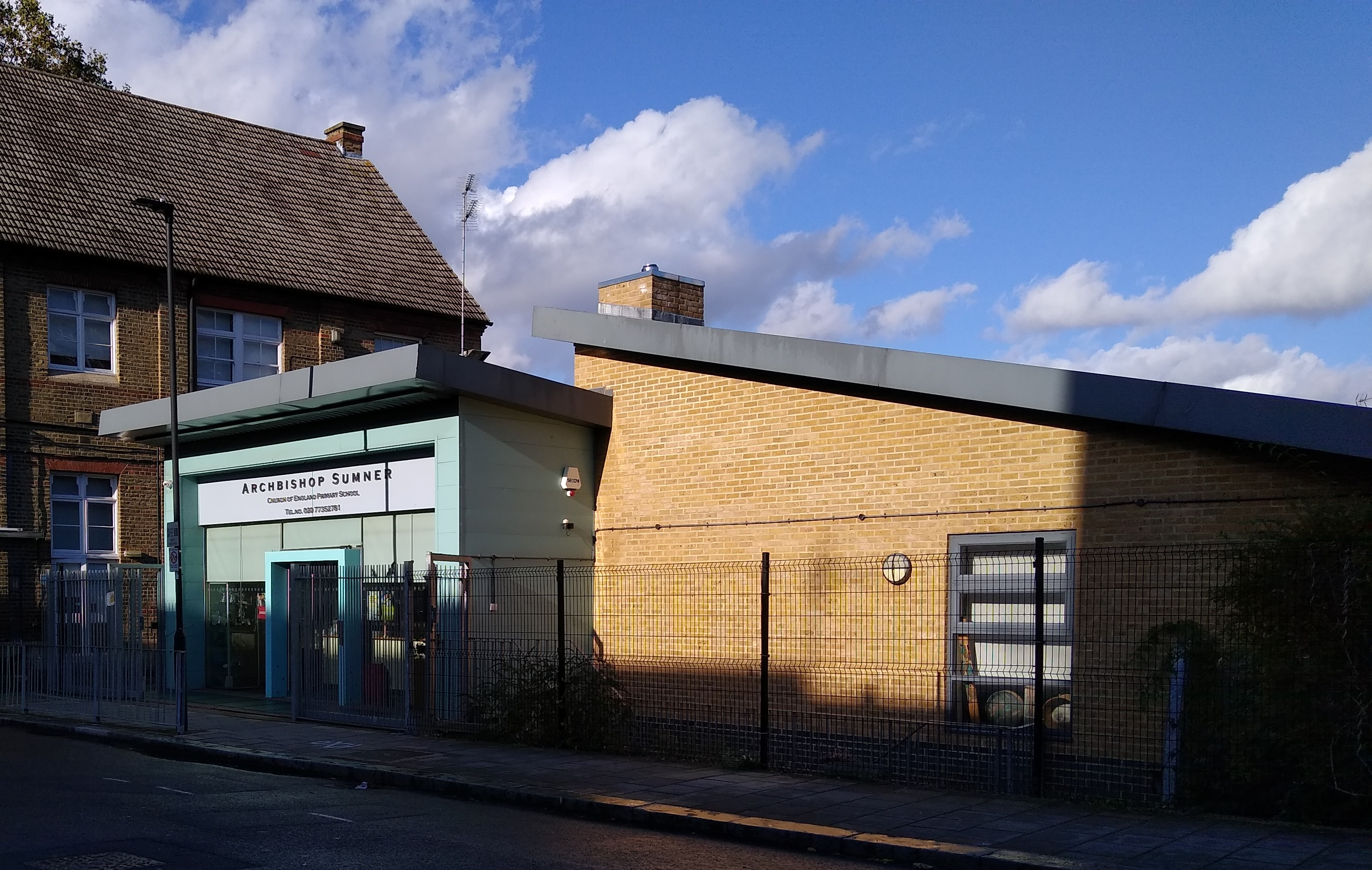
Archbishop Sumner Church of England Primary School

- Allen Edwards Primary School
- Archbishop Sumner CE Primary School
- Ashmole Primary School
- Bonneville Primary School
- Christ Church Primary SW9
- Christ Church Streatham CE Primary School
- Clapham Manor Primary School
- Corpus Christi RC Primary School
- Crown Lane Primary School
- Dunraven School
- Elm Wood Primary School
- Fenstanton Primary School
- Glenbrook Primary School
- Granton Primary School
- Heathbrook Primary School
- Henry Cavendish Primary School
- Henry Fawcett Primary School
- Herbert Morrison Primary School
- Hill Mead Primary School
- Hitherfield Primary School
- Holy Trinity CE Primary School
- Immanuel and St Andrew CE Primary School
- Iqra Primary School
- Jessop Primary School
- Jubilee Primary School
- Julian's Primary School (West Norwood Site)
- Julian's Primary School (Streatham Site)
- Kings Avenue School
- Kingswood Primary School
- Lark Hall Primary School
- Loughborough Primary School
- Macaulay CE Primary School
- Oasis Academy Johanna
- The Orchard School
- Paxton Primary School
- Reay Primary School
- Richard Atkins Primary School
- Rosendale Primary School
- St Andrew's CE Primary School
- St Andrew's RC Primary School
- St Anne's RC Primary School
- St Bede's RC Infant School
- St Bernadette RC Junior School
- St Helen's RC Primary School
- St John the Divine CE Primary School
- St John's Angell Town CE Primary School
- St Jude's CE Primary School
- St Leonard's CE Primary School
- St Luke's CE Primary School
- St Mark's CE Primary School
- St Mary's RC Primary School
- St Saviour's CE Primary School
- St Stephen's CE Primary School
- Stockwell Primary School
- Streatham Wells Primary School
- Sudbourne Primary School
- Sunnyhill Primary School
- Telferscot Primary School
- Van Gogh Primary
- Vauxhall Primary School
- Walnut Tree Walk Primary School
- Woodmansterne School
- Wyvil Primary School

=== Secondary schools ===
- Ark Evelyn Grace Academy
- Bishop Thomas Grant School
- City Heights E-ACT Academy
- Dunraven School
- Elmgreen School
- Harris Academy Clapham
- La Retraite Roman Catholic Girls' School
- Lambeth Academy
- Lilian Baylis Technology School
- London Nautical School
- The Norwood School
- Oasis Academy South Bank
- Platanos College
- St Gabriel's College
- Trinity Academy
- Woodmansterne School

=== Special and alternative schools ===
- Elm Court School
- Evolve Academy
- Heron Academy
- Lansdowne School
- The Livity School
- NAS Vanguard School
- Turney Primary and Secondary Special School

=== Further education ===
- Harris Clapham Sixth Form
- King's College London Mathematics School
- Lambeth College
- The Marine Society College of the Sea (distance education)
- Morley College
- South Bank University Sixth Form

== Independent schools ==
=== Primary and preparatory schools ===
- Oakfield Preparatory School
- Rosemead Preparatory School
- The White House Preparatory School

=== Senior and all-through schools ===
- DLD College
- London Park School Clapham
- Streatham and Clapham High School

=== Special and alternative schools ===
- JUS Education
- Octavia House School
