= Nettlefold =

Nettlefold is an English surname. Notable people with the surname include:

- Archibald Nettlefold (1870–1944), once owner of Walton film studios in England
- Bill Nettlefold (born 1953), Australian rules footballer
- Frederick Nettlefold (1833–1913), British industrialist
- John Sutton Nettlefold (1792–1866), British industrialist and entrepreneur
- John Sutton Nettlefold (social reformer) (1866–1930), English politician
- Joseph Henry Nettlefold (1827–1881), British industrialist
- Len Nettlefold (1905–1971), Australian businessman and amateur golfer
- Lucy Nettlefold (1891–1966), British company director and local politician
- Michael Nettlefold (born 1959), Australian rules footballer
- Thomas Sydney Nettlefold (1879–1956), Australian businessman and politician

== See also ==
- Nettleford
