= Nuttgens =

Nuttgens is a surname. Notable people with the surname include:

- Giles Nuttgens (born 1960), British cinematographer
- Joseph Edward Nuttgens (1892–1982), British stained glass designer
- Patrick Nuttgens (1930–2004), English architect and academic
- Sandy Nuttgens (born 1964), British composer
