= Parks and open spaces in the London Borough of Lambeth =

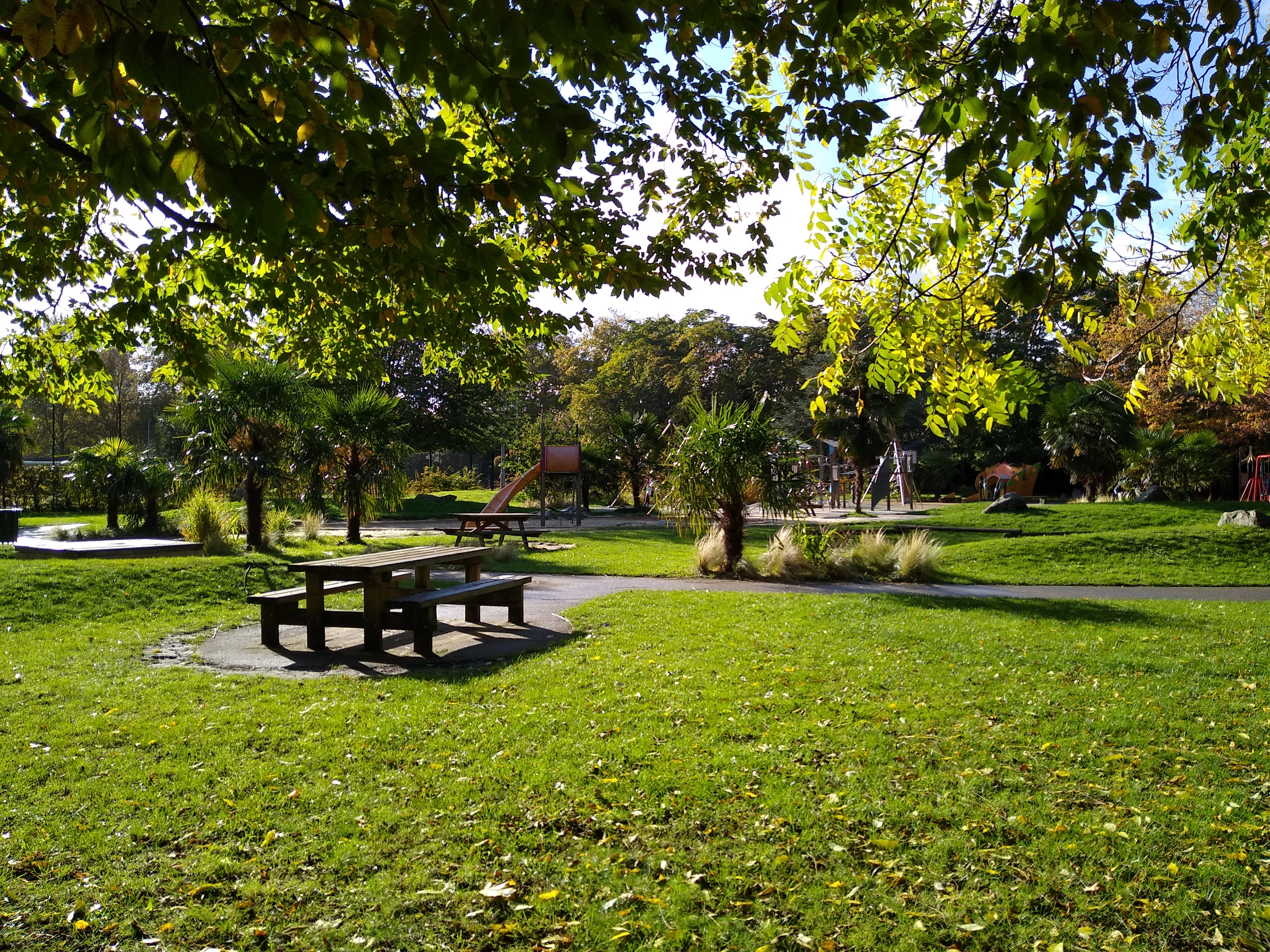
Archbishop's Park

The London Borough of Lambeth, in spite of being close to the centre of London has over 78 parks and open spaces, 27 of which include children's play areas and five paddling pools, within its boundaries.

== Principal parks and open spaces ==
The largest of them include:

- Agnes Riley Gardens, Atkins Road, SW12
- Archbishops Park, Carlisle Lane, SE1, adjacent to Lambeth Palace
- Brockwell Park, Norwood Road, SE24, includes Brockwell Lido (public swimming area)
- Clapham Common, Windmill Drive, SW4, wholly maintained by Lambeth Borough, although the western half is situated in Wandsworth Borough
- Hillside Gardens, Hillside Road, SW2
- Jubilee Gardens, Lambeth, SE1
- Kennington Park, Kennington Park Road, SE11, a wooded area, although it has sports facilities and gardens
- Larkhall Park, Courland Grove, SW8
- Max Roach Park, Brixton Road, SW9 (named after Max Roach in 1986)
- Milkwood Community Park, Milkwood Road, SE24
- Mostyn, Olive Morris and Dan Leno Gardens, Myatt's Fields North housing estate, Akerman Road, SW9
- Myatt's Fields Park, Cormont Road, Camberwell, SE5
- Norwood Park, Salters Hill, SE19 - between West Norwood and Crystal Palace
- Rush Common, Brixton Hill, SW2
- Ruskin Park, Denmark Hill, SE5
- Slade Gardens, Lorn Road, SW9
- Spring Gardens, Tyers Street, SE11
- Streatham Common, Streatham High Road, SW16
- Streatham Vale Park, Abercairn Road, SW16
- The Rookery, Covington Way, SW16, with formal gardens and an open-air theatre
- Vauxhall Park, Lawn Lane, SW8, near The Oval cricket ground
- Vauxhall City Farm, SE11

== Riverside ==
Lambeth is a riverside borough, and one of the largest open spaces is the Thames itself, forming the northern boundary of the borough. A sign posted riverside trail forms a walkway for both pedestrians and cyclists.
