= Norwood Grove =

Ornamental park in London Borough of Croydon, UK

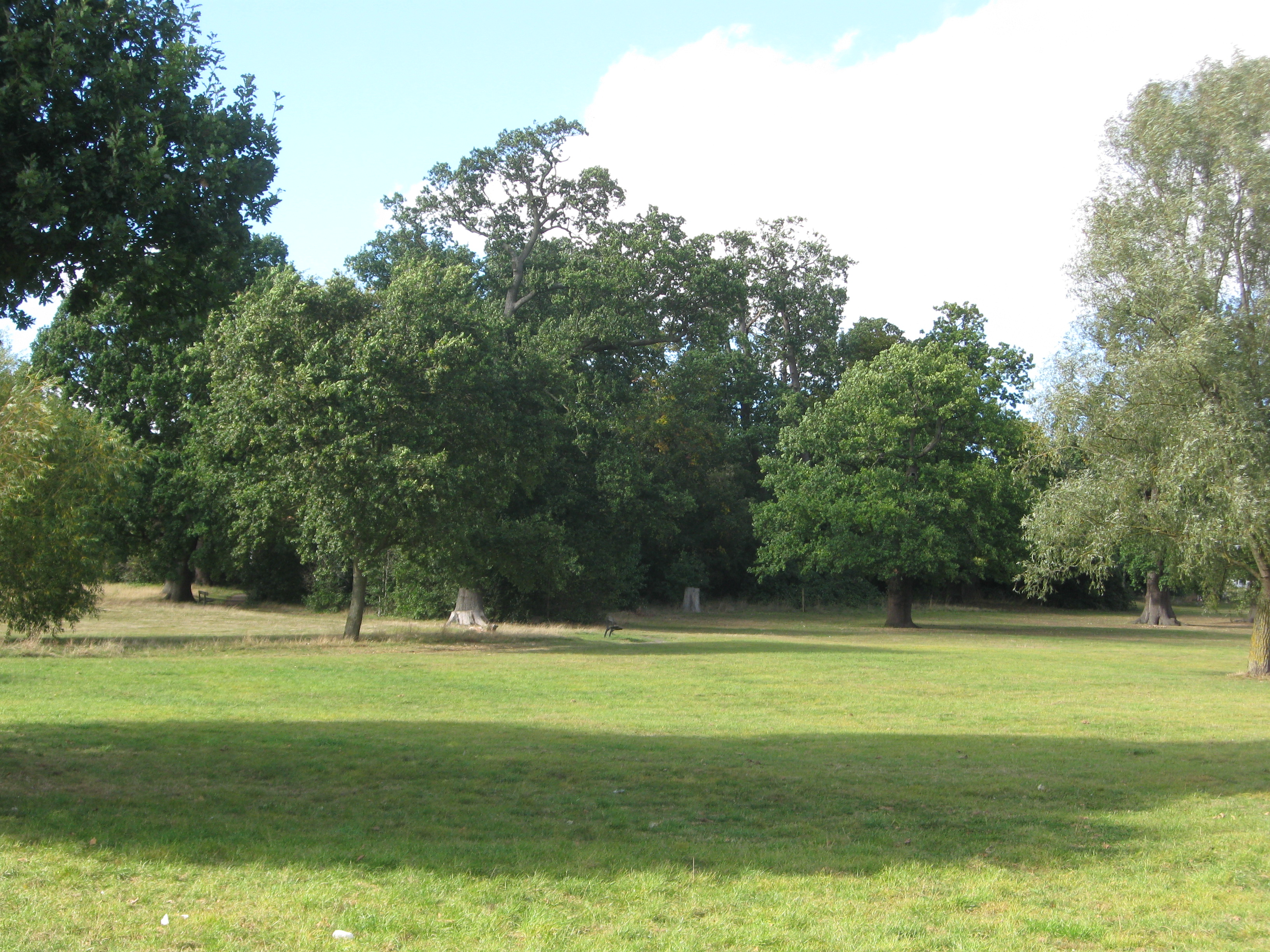
- Norwood Grove, looking north from the Covington Way entrance, September 2019

- Location within Greater London
- Type: Ornamental urban park
- Location: Covington Way, London, SW16
- OS grid: TQ 3117 7044
- Coordinates: 51.41790009°N 0.11501259°W
- Area: 34.5 acres (14.0 ha)
- Elevation: 300 ft (91 m)
- Operator: London Borough of Croydon
- Status: Open all year
- Public transit: London Buses, route 468 to Biggin Hill stop route 250 to Norbury Hill stop

Norwood Grove is an ornamental urban park in the northern extent of the London Borough of Croydon, by whom it is managed, although the most westerly part lies within the London Borough of Lambeth. It is bordered to the south-west by Covington Way, to the south-east by Gibson's Hill and to the north-east by Copgate Path, itself also referred to as 'Norwood Grove', and also by Ryecroft Road. To the north-west the grounds adjoin those of The Rookery (managed by the Borough of Lambeth) which itself adjoins Streatham Common of which Norwood Grove was once a part. The main entrances are on Covington Way and Gibson's Hill but access is also available from Copgate Path as it effectively forms part of the park for much of its length.

== History ==
The site was formerly part of the Great Streatham Common, recorded in the Domesday Book of 1086 as 'Lime Common' which occupied much of the land between Norbury and Tulse Hill. It was partly enclosed in 1635 to form an estate around a 'shooting box', although some sources dispute this. In 1746, a house known as 'Copgate' had been established on the site and by 1800, the estate was known as 'Norbury Grove' and was owned by a Mr. T Mills. In 1847, the site was leased to Arthur Anderson who was a founder of the P&O shipping company.

After Anderson died, ownership passed to the Nettlefold family and subsequently to Frederick Nettlefold the brother of Joseph Nettlefold and a member of the family that founded the Nettlefolds Ltd. engineering firm which later became GKN. Nettlefold is commemorated, as a result of his charitable works, by a blue plaque on the south elevation of the house.

The Nettlefold family sold the mansion and grounds to Croydon Corporation in 1913 and by 1924 it was proposed that it be used for housing. However, a committee formed in 1910 by a Mr. Stenton Covington, to oppose development of The Rookery and which included the Archbishop of Canterbury among its supporters, raised enough funds to purchase the land linking Norwood Grove and The Rookery and an additional 32 acres from the Nettlefold family. The site was declared open by the then Prince of Wales in November 1926. Several residential roads in the area are named after Covington and there is a large oval bird-bath forming part of the ornamental grounds surrounding the house, which is dedicated to him.

To the north-east of the house there is a bowling green and to the west a former stables area, which acted as a plant nursery for Croydon's Parks Department but as of 2019 is disused.

== The White House ==
The build date of the current house is uncertain but its style and finish suggests that it is from the early 19th-century. From October 1987 the building has been Grade II listed. In the past, although the date is uncertain, the house was enlarged with a similar bow frontage to the west of the current building but this was bombed in World War II and was not restored. At the eastern side of the house is an 'orangery' which was used for the display of soft-fruits and half-hardy plants.

At current the lower part of the building is used as a nursery school and the upper part has been privately let since 2017.

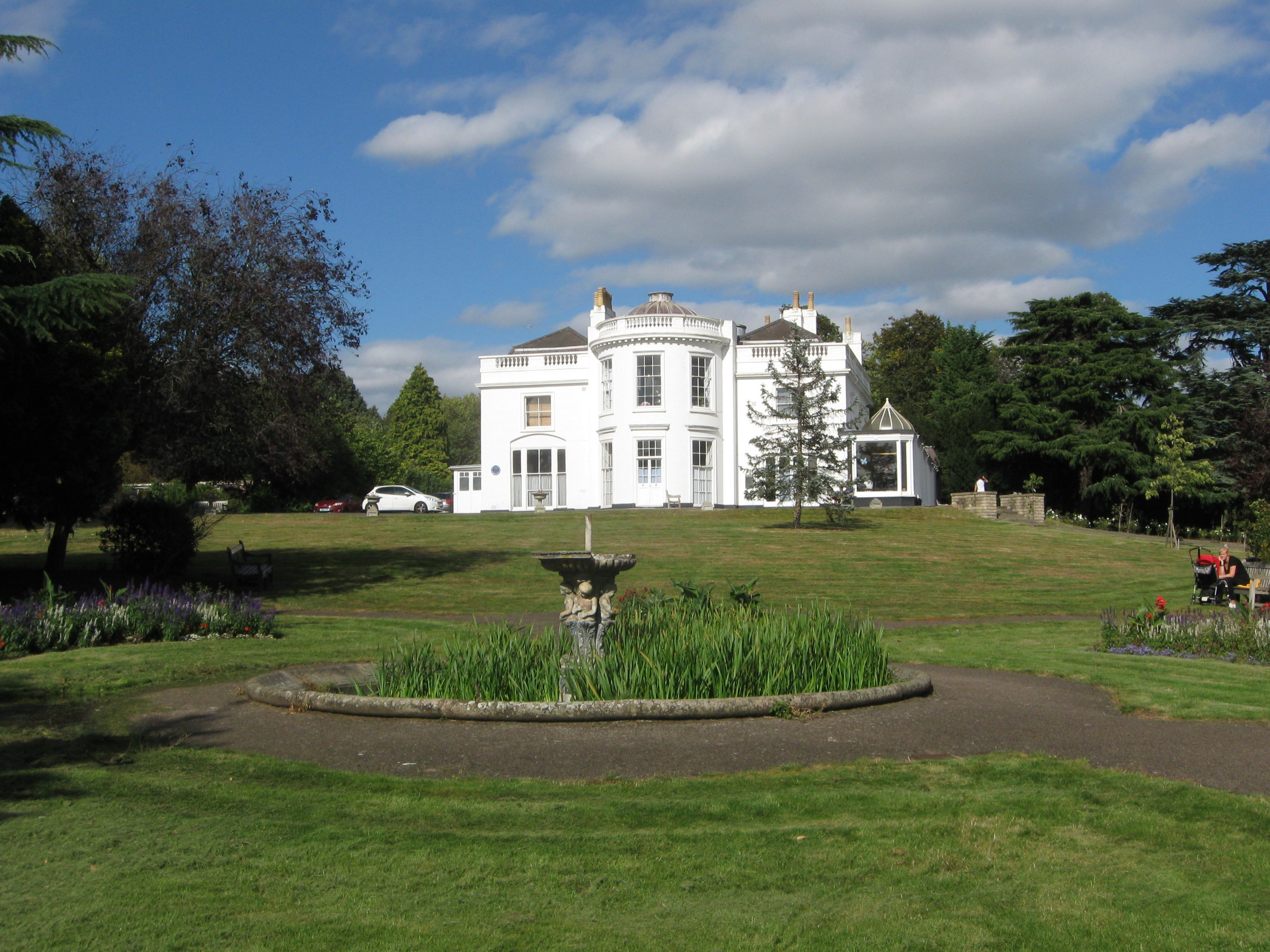
The White House at Norwood Grove in September 2019

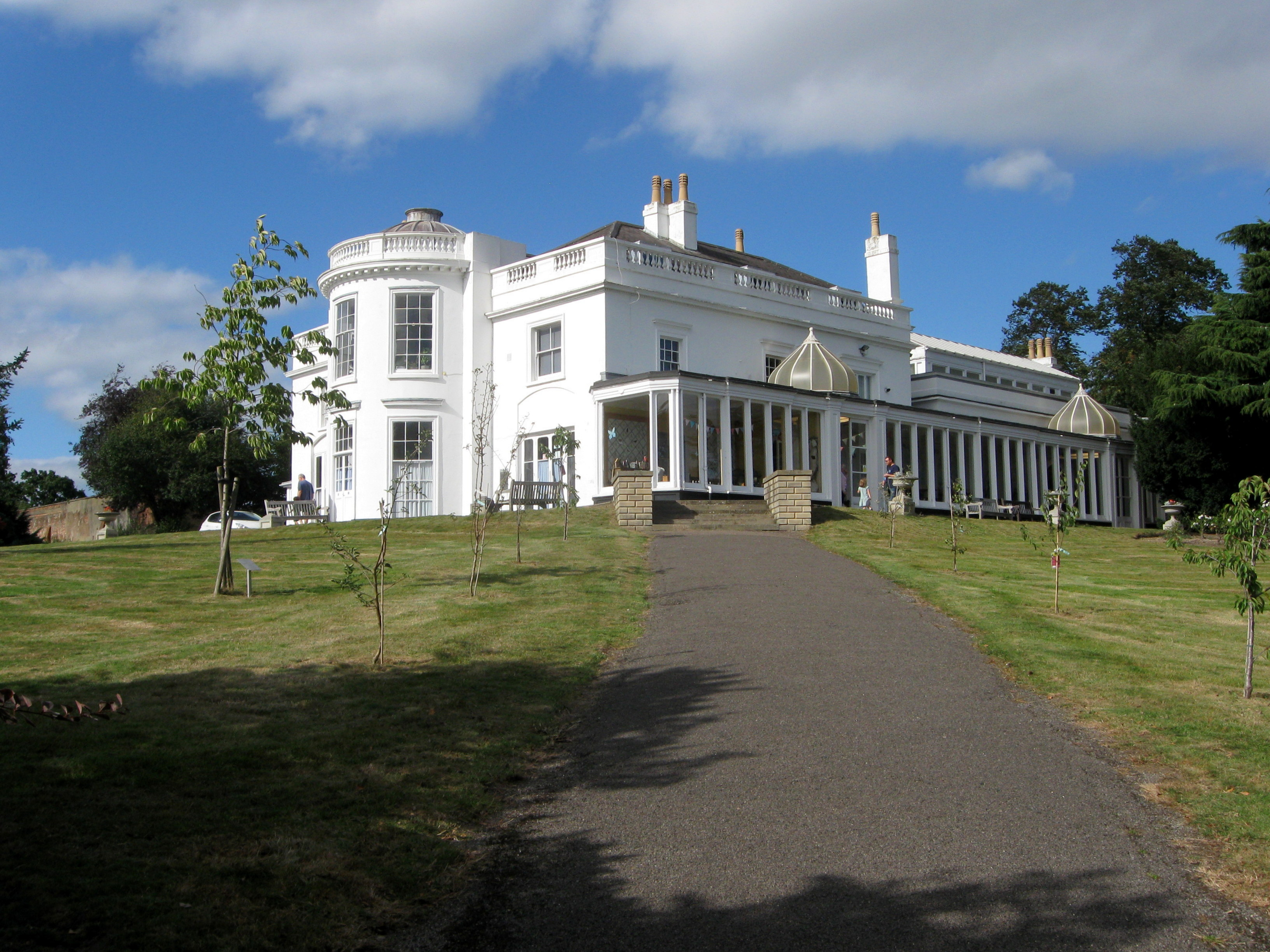
Orangery at Norwood Grove

== See also ==
- List of parks and open spaces in Croydon
- Croydon parks and open spaces
