= West Norwood Library =

Public library in West Norwood, London

Coordinates: 51.4331°N 0.1031°W

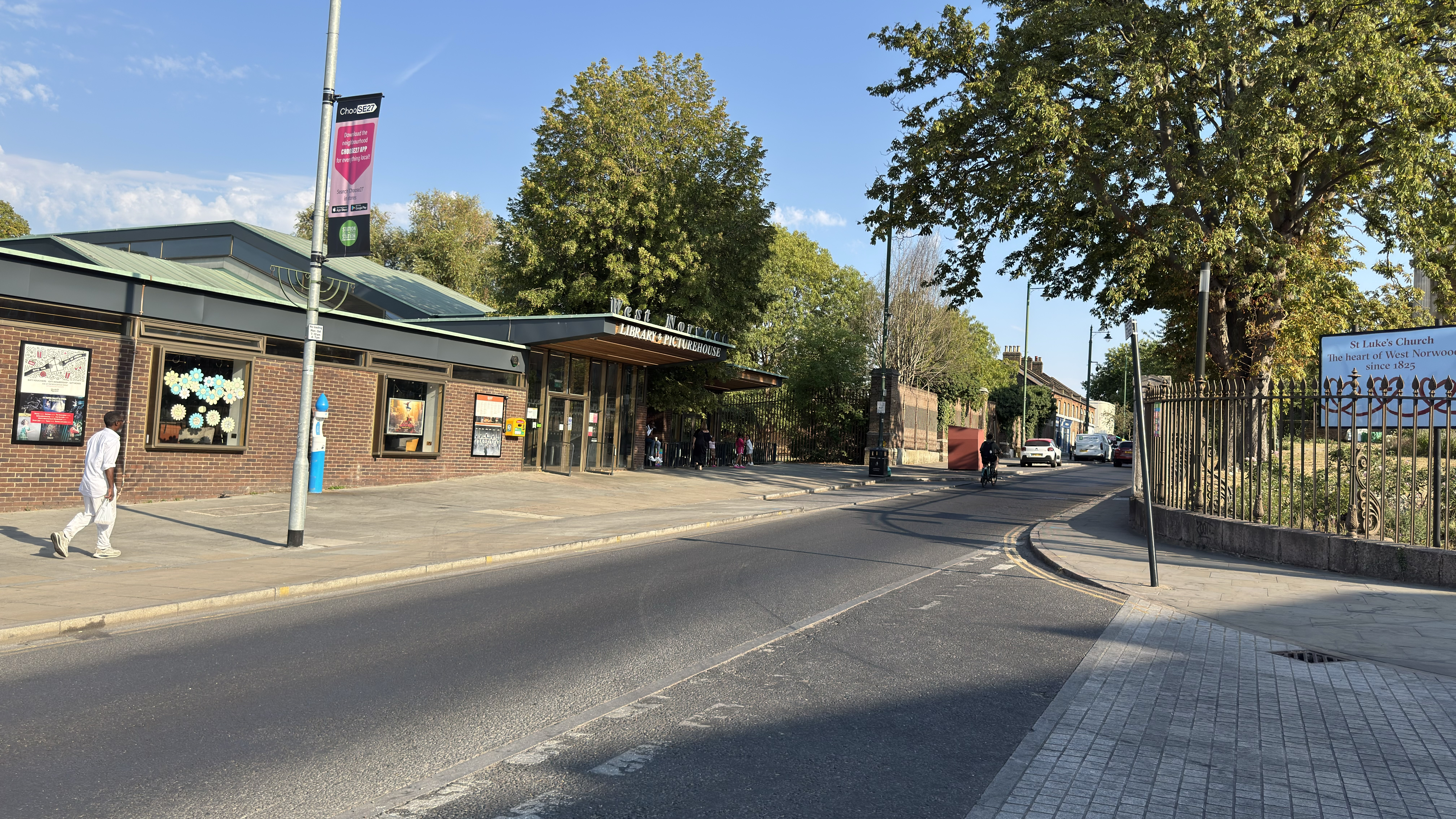
- West Norwood Library and Picturehouse (2026)
- Location: 1-5 Norwood High St, Norwood, London, SE27, United Kingdom
- Type: Public library
- Established: 1969 (57 years ago)

Other information
- Website: https://www.lambeth.gov.uk/libraries-0/west-norwood-library

The West Norwood Library, also known as the West Norwood Public Library and Picturehouse, is a public library in the London Borough of Lambeth in West Norwood, South East London. The building is part of the West Norwood Conservation Area and adjoins the West Norwood Cemetery.

== History ==
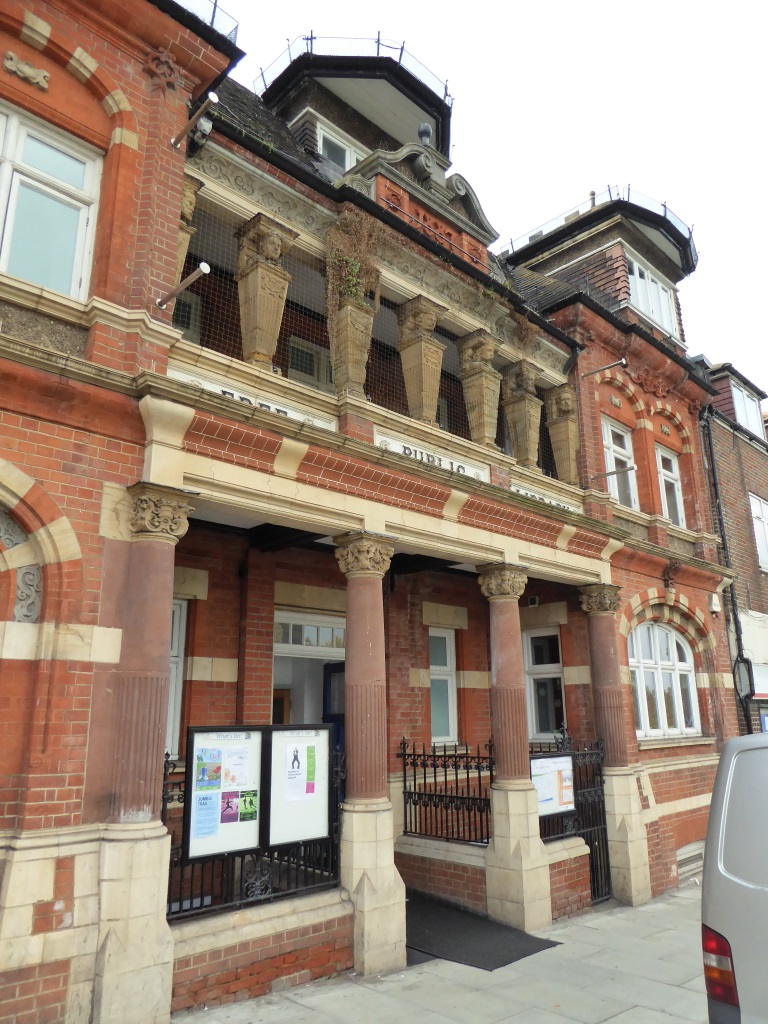
The Old Library in 2015.

The original (later Grade II listed) Lower Norwood Free Public Library was founded by the Earl of Northbrook on 28 July 1888, on Knight's Hill. The building was funded by sugar magnate Sir Henry Tate and designed by the architect Sidney R. J. Smith, and later came under the possession of Frederick Nettlefold.

A new modernist library building, originally named the West Norwood Library and Nettlefold Hall, was designed by architect Edward Hollamby and erected on Norwood High Street. The building was officially opened by Princess Margaret on 12 April 1969.

In October 1984, composers Lawrence Casserley and Simon Desorgher launched the Nettlefold Festival, a contemporary music festival held at the Nettlefold Hall with support from Lambeth Borough Council and the Greater London Arts Association. The festival featured live electroacoustic music and music theatre. The Nettlefold Festival Trust, later moved its main event away from the Hall, staging its first Colourscape Music Festival at the Southbank Centre in 1989, and hosting subsequent events on Clapham Common. In 2005, the organising body was renamed Eye Music Trust.

The building's distinctive verdigiris roof was a unique architectural feature for the time which led to multiple incidents of theft of the expensive copper slates. After a similar incident in June 2011, the Lambeth Council made plans to reconstruct the building, which included substitution of the copper for a less valuable material and the refurbishment of the building interior. From 2015, West Norwood Library underwent significant redevelopment and reopened in 2018 as the West Norwood Library and Picturehouse. Screen 1 of the new cinema occupies the site of the former Nettlefold Hall, in which the distinctive shaped ceiling and exposed metalwork is conserved. The old site of the library now serves as a community centre.

At the rear of the West Norwood Library stands a statue of Oedipus and Jocasta sculpted by David McFall between 1962 and 1972 from a block of French limestone. The material was originally given to McFall by Jacob Epstein and the work was passed onto the London Borough of Lambeth thereafter. Following the 2018 redevelopment of the library building, the statue was reinstated at the site and now stands in the courtyard.

== In popular culture ==
The library, then known as Nettlefold Hall, acted as a filming location for the final scene of A Clockwork Orange directed by Stanley Kubrick in 1977.
