= Arthur Keen (businessman) =

Arthur Keen (23 January 1835 – 8 February 1915) was a British entrepreneur, the Keen in engineering firm Guest, Keen and Nettlefolds, later GKN plc.

== Early years ==
His early years are uncertain but he was born in Cheshire, perhaps near Northwich, the son of a farmer. His early education seems to have been meagre before he joined the London and North Western Railway, probably in some clerical capacity. Somewhere around 1855, he was appointed a goods agent for the railway and relocated to Smethwick where his job led to a network of industrial contacts including Thomas Astbury (1810–1862) who introduced him to Francis Watkins. In 1858, Keen married Astbury's daughter, Hannah. The couple were to go on to parent ten children in half a century of family life in Edgbaston.

== Industrialist ==
Watkins was trying to market his patent nut-making machine in England and Keen saw the potential of the business. The firm of Watkins and Keen was established with capital from Astbury. The firm prospered and in 1864 was launched as a limited company, Watkins retiring a few years later. Keen continued to expand the business through a series of astute mergers and acquisitions. Keen's objective was to establish himself as the market leader in fasteners through aggressive pricing and economies of scale.

Though he modelled his approach on that of another Birmingham firm, Nettlefold and Chamberlain, he achieved less success, possibly being less ruthless and embedded in a more complicated market segment. In 1899, Keen bought the Dowlais Iron Company for £1.5 million from Ivor Bertie Guest, 1st Baron Wimborne, forming Guest, Keen & Co. (GK). At this point, Keen's facility for takeover seems to have faltered with a series of aborted mergers, including one proposed with United States Steel Corporation. However, in 1902, he completed a merger with the neighbouring business of Nettlefolds Limited to create Guest, Keen and Nettlefold (GKN).

GKN was an enormously profitable business and Keen was held in high regard. Much of the business's profitability stemmed from a successful policy of price maintenance through the Birmingham Alliance that he forged with trade unionist Richard Juggins and which was realised in the midland iron and steel wages board. He became a director of the Birmingham and Midland Bank in 1880 and led the series of mergers that established it as the London, City, and Midland Bank.

== Public life ==
Keen made extensive contributions to civil society, including twenty-five years on the Smethwick board of health, service as one of Staffordshire County Council's first aldermen and work with Joseph Chamberlain on the foundation of the University of Birmingham.

Though a Liberal, he opposed home rule and was active in the Liberal Unionist cause. He supported Chamberlain's tariff reforms and served as part of the iron and steel commission. Though called upon, he declined to stand for Parliament.

== Honours ==
- Vice-president Iron and Steel Institute, (1895–1915);
- Vice-president Institution of Mechanical Engineers, (1897–1911).

== Bibliography ==
- Obituary:
  - Birmingham Daily Post, February 9, 1915

- Jones, E (1987) A History of GKN Volume 1: Innovation and Enterprise 1759–1918 ISBN 0-333-34594-0
- Smith, B.D.M. (2004) "Keen, Arthur (1835–1915)", Oxford Dictionary of National Biography, Oxford University Press, accessed 20 June 2005 (subscription or UK public library membership required)
