= King George and Queen Mary =

- Directed by: Rob Coldstream
- Narrated by: Samuel West
- Composers: Sandy Nuttgens; Spike Scott
- Country of origin: United Kingdom

Production
- Producer: Rob Coldstream
- Editor: Mike Burton

Original release
- Network: BBC
- Release: 3 January – 4 January 2012

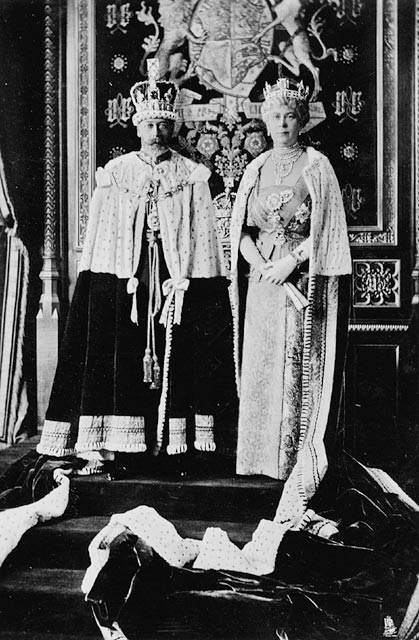
King George V and Queen Mary.

King George and Queen Mary: The Royals who Rescued the Monarchy is a 2012 British documentary series produced by the BBC. The programme premiered on BBC Two and consists of two episodes, each an hour long. The first episode, King George V, premiered on 3 January 2012, and the second, devoted to Queen Mary, premiered on 4 January 2012. Rob Coldstream produced both episodes, and Denys Blakeway served as the executive producer of the series.

The programme explores the lives of King George V and Queen Mary, and their attempts at modernising the British monarchy in response to the massive social changes during and following World War I. The first episode recalls how, fearing anti-German sentiment, the royal house name was changed by King George from the House of Saxe-Coburg and Gotha to the House of Windsor. The series also examines the personal lives of the couple, delving into their relationships with their children, and with each other. The marriage between George and Mary was an arranged marriage, occurring only because Prince Albert Victor, George's brother and Mary's original fiancé, died from influenza. George V is presented in the series as a disciplinarian, who strictly punished his children, but was known to be much more loving to his granddaughter, Queen Elizabeth II.

== Reception ==
John Crace of The Guardian criticised the documentary, remarking that it "repeated familiar mantras about how the royal family cared a great deal more for the country than they did for each other" without ever "asking if we might not have been better off as a republic." Crace notes that the series was one of many programmes about royalty released in 2012, taking advantage of Queen Elizabeth II's Diamond Jubilee. Patrick Smith of The Daily Telegraph was more positive, praising the first episode for its "eye-opening, and at times amusing anecdotes about George's private persona, which were in sharp contrast to the warm description of his public one."
