= Elmwood High School =

Elmwood High School may refer to:

- Elmwood High School (Winnipeg, Manitoba, Canada)
- Elmwood High School (Elmwood, Illinois)
- Elmwood High School (Bloomdale, Ohio)
- Elmwood High School (Elmwood, Wisconsin)

== See also ==
- Elmwood School (disambiguation)
