= Nettleford =

Nettleford is a surname. Notable people with the surname include:

- Rex Nettleford (1933–2010), Jamaican academic and choreographer
- Warren Nettleford, English television presenter

== See also ==
- Nettlefold
