= Elmwood School =

Elmwood School can refer to:

- Elmwood School (Ottawa), a private girls school in Ottawa
- Elmwood School (Berkeley) in Berkeley, California
- Elmwood Normal School in New Zealand
- Elmwood School (Somerset), a special school in Bridgewater, Somerset
- Elmwood School (Croydon)

== See also ==
Elm Wood School
