= Elm Wood Primary School =

Location
- Carnac Street; West Norwood, Lambeth, London; England; 51°25′55″N 0°05′32″W

Information
- Type: Community school
- Established: 1929
- Local authority: Lambeth
- Department for Education URN: 100597 Tables
- Ofsted: Reports
- Chair of Governors: Michael Grimwood
- Gender: Mixed
- Age: 3 to 11
- Enrolment: c.420

Elm Wood School is a primary school based at the southern end of the inner London Borough of Lambeth. The school has gone through a number of changes since its establishment at the beginning of the twentieth century reflecting the changing policies of local and national governing authorities as well as the changing nature of the community it serves.

== History ==
In 1929 Carnac Street Central School (or Carnac Street Central Council School), a Secondary Elementary School, was opened for children up to the age of 14. This was built by the London County Council, reducing the burden placed on earlier established neighbouring schools (such as Salter's Hill School (now known as Kingswood School) and Gipsy Road School (which stood on the site later occupied by Norwood School, Norwood Park Primary School, and now is the temporary home for Elmgreen School). In the 1930s (c.1933/34), the school became known as West Norwood Central School (or West Norwood Central Council School). The name was not indicative of the geographic position of the school within South London, given that the school buildings were on the very edge of West Norwood's border with West Dulwich (with two of the four roads enclosing the block in which the school stands are in West Dulwich). Following the Education Act 1944, when the schooling system in the United Kingdom was restructured into primary, secondary and further education, the school became a Secondary School under the name West Norwood Central Mixed School in 1951/1952, also known as West Norwood Secondary School or West Norwood Comprehensive.

In this form, the school was deemed to have been a pioneer. However, in the late 1950s a number of schools were established by the London County Council to form the vanguard of comprehensive education. A large number of pupils and staff from West Norwood Central moved to the brand new Kingsdale School which opened in 1958. Of the remaining pupils within West Norwood Central's former catchment area, a great many went to the newly established Norwood School for Girls, based at that time on the same premises as the former Gipsy Road School. For those wanting boys only education, the giant Tulse Hill School for boys had been established in 1956 and had already been taking in pupils that may formerly have gone to West Norwood Central.

After this, in 1960/1961 the school became a primary school for children up to the age of 11 under the new name of Elm Wood Primary School. Colloquially, the school's name has been spelt both as Elmwood and Elm Wood but the school is officially Elm Wood School, a Junior and Mixed Infants School.

== School name ==
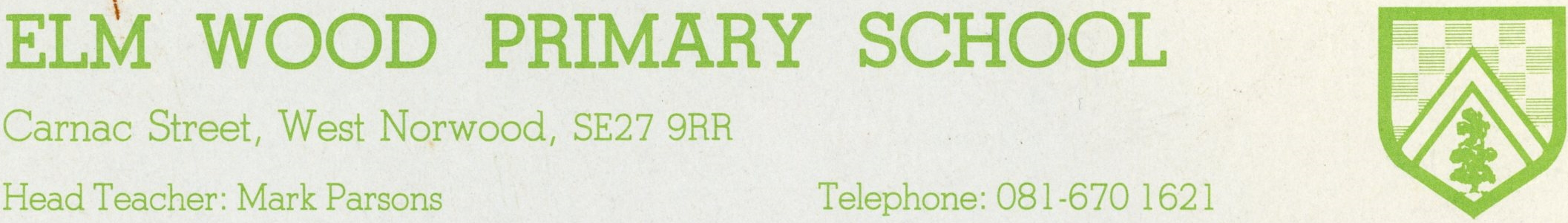
Elm Wood Primary School Crest from 1991

The school's name has reflected its location in all its changing forms. Originally known as Carnac Street School, this reflected the street upon which its entrance faces. Its next incarnation as West Norwood Central School (and Central Mixed School) is reflective of the fact that it is based in West Norwood. Elmwood (and Elm Wood) appear to be a departure from this trend. However, the area, which was once part of what was called the "Great North Wood" (from which the area Norwood itself is a corruption), was once strewn with Elms which is reflected in many other local place names such as Elm Court Road, The Elms, Elmworth Grove, all within a half-mile radius of the school.

Elmwood is also in a federation of other schools like Kingswood, Paxton and Crawford.

== Buildings ==
The school is very little changed since it was first built at the beginning of the twentieth century. In the playground, an 'annexe' was built housing two classrooms built to absorb the 'baby boom', which were in use around 1970. In the centre of the front wall remains a coat of arms, although these are not those specifically of the school but of the London County Council. Since 2006 however the school has changed dramatically, from the building of a multi-purpose sports facility in the rear playground to an ICT suite which has replaced a library and resource room.

== Ofsted reports ==
A number of reports on the school can be found in the relevant section of the OFSTED website.

== Sports facilities ==
In 2004 Lambeth London Borough Council was awarded £4.3million of government funds for better sports facilities. The first beneficiary of this was Elm Wood which was given money to build a Multi-Use Games Area with markings for basketball, netball, tennis, five-aside football and kwik cricket.
