= West Norwood =

Suburb of London

Coordinates: 51.427025°N 0.095539°W

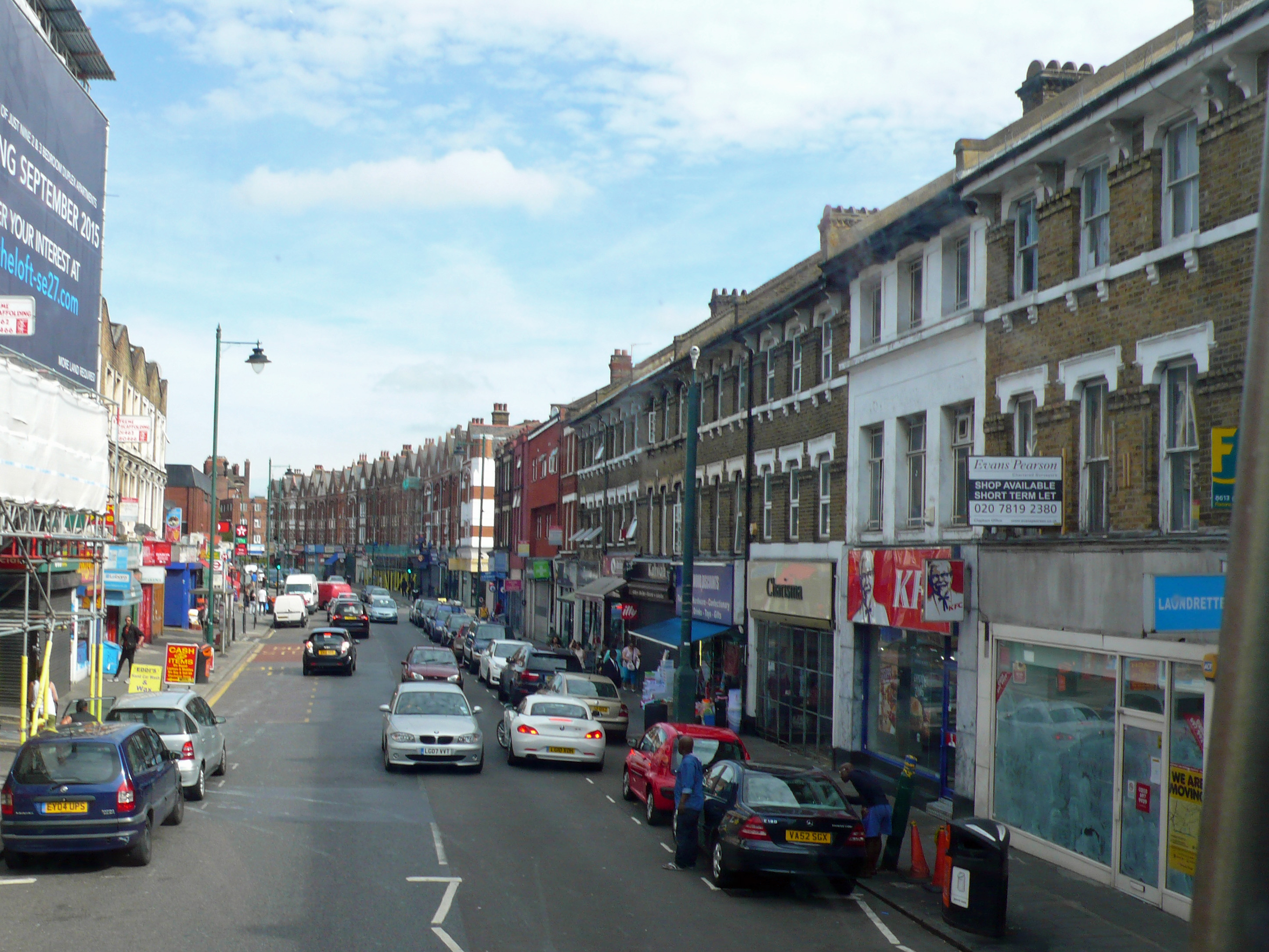
- Norwood Road, West Norwood

- Location within Greater London
- OS grid reference: TQ325715
- London borough: Lambeth
- Ceremonial county: Greater London
- Region: London
- Country: England
- Sovereign state: United Kingdom
- Post town: LONDON
- Postcode district: SE27
- Dialling code: 020
- Police: Metropolitan
- Fire: London
- Ambulance: London
- UK Parliament: Dulwich and West Norwood
- London Assembly: Lambeth and Southwark

West Norwood is a largely residential area of south London within the London Borough of Lambeth, located 5.4 miles (8.7 km) south south-east of Charing Cross. The centre of West Norwood sits in a bowl surrounded by hillsides on its east, west and south sides. From many parts of the area, distant views can be seen, of places such as the City of London, Canary Wharf and Crystal Palace.

West Norwood includes some or all of three wards of the London Borough of Lambeth – Gipsy Hill, Knights Hill and West Dulwich. On Lambeth Council, Gipsy Hill and West Dulwich are represented by two councillors each, whilst Knights Hill is represented by three councillors.

== History ==
A map showing the Norwood ward of Lambeth Metropolitan Borough as it appeared in 1916.

"Norwood" recalls the "Great North Wood", a name that was formerly used for the hilly and wooded area to the north of Croydon. Before 1885 West Norwood station and the surrounding area was known as "Lower Norwood", reflecting its being at a lower altitude than Upper Norwood.

John Rocque's 1745 map of London and the surrounding area includes the Horns Tavern at Knight's Hill, opposite what is now the main entrance to West Norwood station, with a largely undeveloped valley stretching to 'Island Green' in the north, approximately where Herne Hill railway station stands now. The enclosure map of 50 years later shows that little of the original woodland remained by then, other than a few coppices.

The future development of West Norwood was assisted by the Lambeth Manor Inclosure Act 1806 (46 Geo. 3. c. lvii). Much of the land covered by this act was owned either by the Archbishop of Canterbury or by Lord Thurlow, who died in the same year.

Most of the current main roads were either ancient or laid out in accordance with the provisions of the enclosure award. The River Effra ran alongside the current Elder Road, in a northerly direction, and was prone to flooding.

The area was over a mile from the nearest parish church (at St Leonard, Streatham), so St. Luke's was provided under the Waterloo church scheme and completed in 1825. The houses in the parish at that period consisted largely of substantial villas along the main roads and more humble cottages mainly situated between Knights Hill and the High Street. The South Metropolitan Cemetery was laid out in 1837 to provide burial facilities largely for the population of crowded areas that were closer to the centre of London.

The railway line from London to the Crystal Palace was opened in 1856 with a station at Lower Norwood (since renamed West Norwood). These improved communications heralded major changes. Many of the larger houses and gardens were demolished and replaced with predominantly more modest housing over the next four decades.

Norwood High Street contained the earliest group of shops in the area but never developed into a major shopping centre, as the main shopping parades were built during the decades around 1900 along Norwood Road between York Hill and West Norwood station. Horse-drawn trams shuttled passengers along this road from the terminus in front of St Luke's Church towards the middle of London.

Extensive anecdotal and other historical material from the 19th and early 20th centuries has been written up by Mr J. B. Wilson, a local undertaker.

The two world wars witnessed fatalities and bomb damage to many buildings in the area, with York Hill and the areas around the railway suffering particularly badly. Chatsworth Baptist church had to be rebuilt after a direct hit. Many of the post-war estates were built on bomb sites or replaced areas which had experienced damage.

An Art Deco cinema, named The Regal, was built at 304 Norwood Road in the late 1920s. It was designed by architect F. Edward Jones (who also designed Madame Tussaud's) and opened on 16 January 1930. The cinema sat 2,010 and was equipped with a Christie Manual organ. The cinema closed on 8 February 1964 with a double screening of Peter Sellers' I'm Alright Jack and Two Way Stretch. Following its closure, the building became a Top Rank Bingo Club a few months later and remained open until 1978. The building was demolished in November 1981 and a B&Q store can be seen today on the site.

After the Second World War, a considerable amount of council housing was constructed in West Norwood. The York Hill, Fern Lodge, Portobello and Holderness Estates arose during the late 1940s and the 1950s on the sites of houses with large gardens that had been destroyed by bombing or were simply demolished. Later houses and flats, such as in the Dunbar Street area, took the place of Victorian dwellings that were cleared away as slums or, alternatively, to achieve a higher density of development. The Woodvale Estate in Elder Road was erected on the site of the "Lambeth New Schools", which had been part of the local Workhouse and that had been renamed as "Wood Vale" before demolition.

Parts of West Norwood have been declared conservation areas including the area around the cemetery, Lancaster Avenue and Rosendale Road. Local landmarks such as St Luke's Church, the late Victorian fire station (now the South London Theatre) on Norwood High Street, by the architect Robert Pearsall., The early 20th-century former fire station at Norwood Road and the original public library at Knights Hill are Grade II listed buildings.

=== Knights Hill ===
Confusingly, there are two areas called Knight's Hill nearby; the names of both areas have similar origins, both belonging to Thomas Knyght in 1545, and in the south was known as Knight's Hill Common while the hill to the north was known as Knight's Hill Farm.

- The better-known area is the residential area and electoral ward to the south west by the road called Knights Hill.

The southern Knight's Hill Common originally formed part of Lambeth Manor and contained land called Julian's, which is remembered through the street name of St Julian's Farm Road. The hill formed the nucleus of the vast estate in Lambeth and Streatham that Lord Thurlow acquired during the 18th Century,

- The second Knight's Hill is above the Tulse Hill railway tunnel, near West Dulwich railway station – which was originally called Lower Knights Hill station. It includes the hilly land between the western end of Thurlow Park Road (South Circular), Peabody Hill and Lovelace Road, and is now partly used by Rosendale Allotments in SE21. The green area is still marked as Knight's Hill on large scale maps but is normally not marked as such on modern street maps in order to avoid confusion. Originally, the northern Knight's Hill farm was part of the Manor of Levehurst, and later of the Manor of Leigham Court and the parish of Streatham.

=== The Jewish Orphanage ===
The main building of the Norwood Home for Jewish Children ("The Jewish Orphanage") was completed in 1862. It was a three-storey edifice, with the appearance of a Jacobean palace This structure was demolished in 1963, after the children had moved in groups to live in nine houses supervised by house parents in a less institutional environment, meeting for communal activities at a new synagogue built on the original site. In the 1970s, the charity moved out of the area and the main site was sold to Lambeth Council, which developed much of it for a housing estate, keeping only a small area beside the railway line as open space and converting the synagogue into a community facility known as the Norwood Hall. Some of this open space is now occupied by the West Norwood Health and Leisure Centre but the site of Norwood Hall has been landscaped. An account of a boy's experiences of living at the Orphanage between 1928 and 1933 can be found online.

Of the original buildings only the porter's lodge off Knights Hill now remains, its curving Dutch-gables, red brick with black diaperwork and mullioned windows echoing the design of the main 3-storey institution. The Arnold & Jane Gabriel Home was built on the Wolfington Road frontage of the orphanage in 1910; it was converted into Julians primary school in 2012, which now features a colourful modern extension to the original building.

The charity that operated the orphanage in West Norwood retains an echo of its previous location in its current name Norwood.

== Transport ==
The area is well served by public transport with these National Rail stations at each end of the main shopping area in Norwood Road, providing the services shown to central London and beyond:

- West Norwood – services to Victoria, Clapham Junction and London Bridge.
- Tulse Hill – services to London Bridge, London Blackfriars, City Thameslink, Farringdon, Luton Airport, Kings Cross, St Pancras and St Albans.

Trains also run from both these stations to a variety of destinations further south of the centre of London.

Other nearby railway stations are:

- Gipsy Hill
- Herne Hill
- West Dulwich

The tube stations closest to West Norwood are at Brixton and Balham, both of which can be reached by bus and, in the case of Balham, also by train.

Eight daytime bus routes and two night-time routes serve the area. West Norwood bus garage is located at Ernest Avenue.

The South Circular (A205) passes close by at Tulse Hill and Streatham High Road (A23) is about one mile to the west of the centre of West Norwood.

== Education ==
The primary and secondary schools listed below are in West Norwood.

=== Primary ===
- Crown Lane primary school, Crown Lane, SW16 3HX
- Elm Wood Primary School, Carnac Street, SE27 9RR
- Julian's primary school, Gabriel House, 16 Wolfington Road, SE27 0JF
- Kingswood primary school, Gipsy Road, SE27 9RD — this school has two sites; the Upper School at the south west corner of Gipsy Road and Salters Hill and the Lower School at 55 Gipsy Hill.
- St Luke's Church of England primary school, Linton Grove, SE27 0DZ

=== Secondary ===
- The Norwood School, Crown Dale, SE19 3NY
- Elmgreen School, Elmcourt Road, SE27 9BZ
- The Park Campus, Gipsy Road, SE27 9NP.

There are a large number of other publicly funded and also private schools within a short distance of West Norwood.

== Landmarks ==
These include:

- South London Theatre Centre. This building was constructed in 1881 as West Norwood's first fire station and has a prominent watch tower. It was subsequently used as a church hall by St Luke's church before its present use commenced. In August 2014 the theatre was awarded a grant of £1.6m by the Heritage Lottery Fund to enable restoration work, which was completed in April 2018.
- West Norwood Health and Leisure Centre, a £14.2M million health and leisure centre opened in 2014.
- St Luke's Church. One of four Lambeth Waterloo churches, the others are St Matthew, St Mark, and St John. Architect Francis Octavius Bedford designed this church and St John's in a similar neoclassical style. St Luke's was built between 1822 and 1825, and was reordered by G E Street in 1870–1872. Unusually for a church it is oriented north–south instead of east–west. This is due to a requirement when Lambeth Manor was enclosed that no building in the area that included the site should be erected within 100 feet of an existing building without the permission of the owner of the other building. An objection from the owner of the Horn's Tavern meant St Luke's had to be built in a north–south orientation to avoid falling within 100 feet of the tavern. The lower part of the churchyard at St Luke's has been laid out as gardens and are used as one of the venues of the West Norwood Feast.
- West Norwood Library & Nettlefold Hall, Norwood High Street. Princess Margaret opened the building in April 1969. The complex is now the West Norwood Library and Picturehouse.
- West Norwood Cemetery, one of London's Magnificent Seven Victorian burial places, with 66 listed structures, many in the Gothic style. Opened 1837.
- The Old Library. In 2004 this has been a cafe and venue for local meetings, activities, exhibitions and events. The building opened on 21 July 1888 as the first public library in Lambeth and was designed by Sidney Smith, architect of Tate Britain and several other Lambeth libraries, using red brick, terracotta and Ham Hill stone, with a balcony above the entrance loggia. It was commissioned by Sir Henry Tate on land donated by Frederick Nettlefold: both of these local philanthropists are buried in West Norwood Cemetery.
- Mrs Woodford Fawcett Fountain – on a traffic island in front of St Luke's Church, where Norwood Road splits into Norwood High Street and Knights Hill. Mrs Fawcett was a local temperance campaigner and is buried in West Norwood Cemetery whose entrance faces the fountain.

== Churches ==
During recent years, the number and variety of churches has increased, reflecting the diverse origins of many new residents. The following congregations meet in buildings that are readily identified as places of worship:

- All Nations Christian Centre, 15 York Hill, SE27 0BU
- Bethel Chapel, Dunbar Street, SE27 9JY
- Cathedral of Revival Church, Beadman Street (r/o 42–44 Norwood High Street), SE27 9UR
- Chatsworth Baptist Church, Chatsworth Way, SE27 9HN
- Lansdowne Evangelical Free Church, Lansdowne Hill, SE27 0AR
- Potter's House Christian Church Norwood, 58E Knights Hill, SE27 0JD
- Salvation Army, 246 Norwood Road, SE27 9AW
- St. Luke's Anglican church, Knights Hill, SE27 0HS
- St Matthew's Catholic Church, 37 Norwood High Street, SE27 9JU
- The Messiah Cherubim & Seraphim Church, 28 Ernest Avenue, SE27 0DJ
- Trinity Baptist Church, 2 Thornlaw Road, SE27 0SA
- West Norwood Spiritualist Church, Ullswater Road, SE27 0AL
- Worldwide Mission Fellowship, 61–65 Elder Road, SE27 9NB

A former Congregational church stands on the south side of Chapel Road, SE27 0UR. It is a Grade II Listed Building and the only local purpose-built church in West Norwood that survives but no longer used for worship. The premises currently house a child care facility.

== Open spaces ==
The main open space in West Norwood is Norwood Park.

West Norwood Cemetery has an area of 45 acres (18.2 hectares) and is close to the railway station. The Friends of West Norwood Cemetery aim to increase knowledge and appreciation of this facility.

Peabody Hill Wood is an area of outstanding importance recognised by English Nature.

== Charities ==
- Emmaus South Lambeth is based at Knights Hill and Beadman Street. This community for formerly homeless individuals runs a workshop and shops that renovate and sell second-hand furniture and other goods.
- L'Arche Lambeth provides 5 residential care homes and 5 day provision workshops in the area for adults with learning disabilities. It is part of the International Federation of L'Arche.
- Centre 70 is a charity specialising in free, confidential, impartial legal advice on Debt, Welfare Benefits, Housing, Utilities Debt and Student Finance. Also provides low cost Counselling

== Clocks in West Norwood ==
- St Luke's church tower clock was supplied by Vulliamy, the Royal Clockmaker, in 1825 for £357 and was retained when Street renovated the church in 1870, new tubular bells being added in 1892.
- ‘The Clockworks’ at 6 Nettlefold Place houses a museum, workshop and library. It is run by The Clockworks Charitable Incorporated Organisation which was established in 2020, in place of the Clockworks Trust.

== Nearest places ==
- Crystal Palace
- Dulwich
- Gipsy Hill
- Streatham
- Tulse Hill
- Upper Norwood

== Notable former and current residents ==
- Adele, singer
- Joanna Byrne, actress
- Bilinda Butcher, vocals and guitar in the band My Bloody Valentine
- Joan Clarke, code-breaker at Bletchley Park and numismatist
- Theodore Dru Alison Cockerell, zoologist and taxonomist
- Sir Sidney Colvin, historian, literary and art critic
- Maurice Cowling, historian
- Mark Croft, Singaporean tennis player
- Des'ree, singer
- Edmund de Waal, ceramicist
- John Fraser, former Labour MP for Norwood 1966–1992
- Georg Hackenschmidt, the first world wrestling champion
- Euan Uglow, English artist
- Sir Philip Holland, former Conservative MP for Gedling
- Ken Livingstone, former mayor of London
- Liz Lloyd, former prime minister Tony Blair's deputy chief of staff
- Maxi Jazz, vocalist in band Faithless
- Hiram Maxim, who developed his machine gun in the garden of his house in Norwood Road (Serbia House, now demolished)
- The Noisettes, rock band
- Sandy Nuttgens, television composer
- Michael Paraskos, novelist, anarchist writer on art and literary critic
- Benedict Read, FSA, art historian, writer and art curator.
- Sir John Scarlett, former Head of MI6
- Andrew Turnbull, Baron Turnbull, former Cabinet Secretary
- Tom Utley, Daily Telegraph and Daily Mail journalist
- Thomas Wallis, art deco architect
- Andy Zaltzman, comedian
- Luke Aaron Moore, COO of Stak and The Football Ramble Podcast Host

== Appearances of West Norwood in culture ==
Stormzy's 2019 headline performance on the Pyramid Stage at Glastonbury festival included screens listing the south London boroughs that shaped the rapper - West Norwood was mentioned, alongside South Norwood, Thornton Heath, Selhurst, Norbury and Croydon.

A Clockwork Orange was partially filmed in Nettlefold Hall. When the building was converted into the West Norwood Picturehouse, the cinema included orange seats as a reference to the movie.

The Tunnels, the 2026 science fiction novel by Ian Watson, is loosely set in West Norwood. In an interview with Brixton Buzz, Watson said: "I don’t ever name West Norwood as the setting, but anyone who’s familiar with the landmarks will recognise it straight away."
