= Harris Academy Clapham =

Location
- 33 Clarence Avenue; Lambeth, London, SW4 8LD; England
- Coordinates: 51.453020°N 0.132384°W

Information
- Type: Free school
- Motto: Everything is possible, when you CARE
- Established: 01/09/2020
- Founder: Gizlé Landman
- Local authority: London Borough of Lambeth
- Trust: Harris Federation
- Department for Education URN: 147543 Tables
- Ofsted: Reports
- Principal: Jenny Rose
- Executive headteacher: David Astin
- Staff: 150
- Gender: Mixed
- Age range: 11–16
- Enrolment: 818
- Capacity: 750
- Campus size: 975
- Campus type: Urban
- Houses: Angelou, Attenborough, Frank, Jemison, King, Pele, Shakespeare
- Website: harrisclapham.org.uk

Harris Academy Clapham is a coeducational 11-16 secondary school located in the Clapham area of Lambeth, Greater London, England. It is part of the Harris Federation.

== Description ==
The new school opened during the COVID-19 pandemic. The building had been designed to accommodate a 7 form entry, 11-16 free school. It was intended that in the first year (from September 2020) just the year 7s would be on site, and the school would fill up behind them in 2021, 2022, 2023 and 2024. It was designed by the architects Stride Treglown. The academy shares a plot with Glenbrook Primary School which had recently been rebuilt by the same architects. The building has five storeys as the aim was to have as much outdoor space as possible.

== Curriculum ==
The school follows the National Curriculum. It teaches Key Stage 3 in years 7 to 9, and Key Stage 4 in years 10 to 11, resulting in GCSE qualifications. All pupils are taught both Spanish and Chinese at Key Stage 3.

== New sixth form ==
A sixth form college has been built by the Harris Federation on the site of the former Territorial Army site at 73 Kings Avenue.

The site is compact, and there was opposition from residents about the mass of the building and the lack of outdoor space. The planning statement said: “The building will accommodate some 600 sixth form students aged 16+ in Years 12 and 13, with some 70 teaching and other staff; in the first year of operation it is anticipated there will be 300 students in Year 12 and 50 staff. It will be 3, and in parts 4 story, with a footprint of 6,027m².

The sixth form opened on 1 September 2021. The headteacher is Mr James Handscombe. In 2023, the Sixth Form received their first set of results, with 17% of A Level grades at an A/A*, and 41% of A Level grades at B or better. For vocational students, 55% of grades were at distinction or distinction*.
