= Woodmansterne School =

Location
- Woodmansterne Road; Streatham; London, SW16 5UQ; England
- Coordinates: 51.4125°N 0.135°W

Information
- Type: Community school
- Local authority: Lambeth
- Department for Education URN: 100590 Tables
- Ofsted: Reports
- Headteacher: Samantha Palin
- Gender: Co-educational
- Age: 3 to 18
- Website: www.woodmansterne.london

Woodmansterne School is a co-educational all-through school and sixth form located in the Streatham area of the London Borough of Lambeth, England.

It is a community school administered by Lambeth London Borough Council. Originally a primary school, in 2016 Lambeth London Borough Council launched a consultation on plans to construct a secondary school department on the existing school site. The school then admitted its first cohort of secondary-age pupils in September 2017.

Woodmansterne School offers GCSEs, BTECs and Cambridge Nationals as programmes of study for pupils, while students in the sixth form have the option to study from a range of A-Levels and further BTECs.
