= Streatham Common =

Park in Streatham, London, England

Coordinates: 51°25′20″N 0°7′28″W

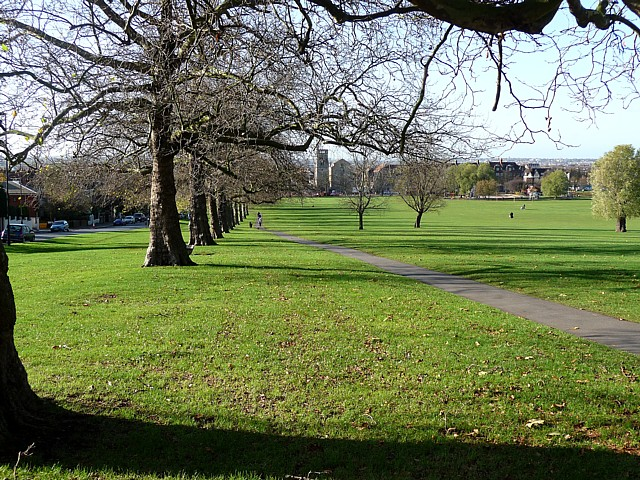
Streatham Common, looking west towards Streatham High Road. The tower in the distance is that of Immanuel Church.

Streatham Common is a large open space on the southern edge of Streatham in the London Borough of Lambeth. The shallow sloping lower (western) half of the common is mostly mowed grass, and the upper (eastern) half is mostly woodland with some small areas of gorse scrub and acid grassland. The eastern half has been designated a Local Nature Reserve.

== History ==
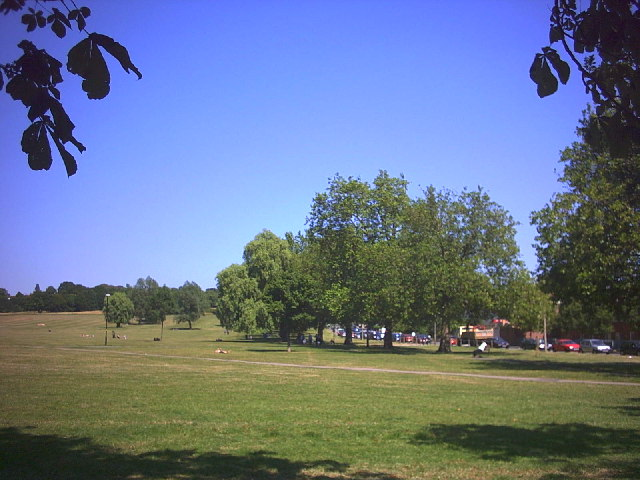
Streatham Common

Streatham Common is one of two former areas of common land in the former parish of Streatham. The other is now known as Tooting Bec Common. After enclosure, the Common was purchased in 1883 for use as a public open space under the powers conferred under the Metropolitan Commons Act 1878. It was at this time that most of the trees lining the edges of the lower common were planted. The Common was conveyed to the Metropolitan Board of Works and was subsequently administered by the London County Council and Greater London Council before maintenance responsibility passed to the London Borough of Lambeth in 1971.

The Common had a long tradition of cricket playing from the 18th century, and the right to play cricket is enshrined in the Supplementary Act that brought the common into public ownership.

Thomas Ripley the famous architect built and lived at 10 Streatham Common South, now known as Ripley House. Henry Tate, founder of the Tate Gallery and the Tate & Lyle sugar company lived at Park Hill by the Common.

Vincent Van Gogh drew a picture of Streatham Common in 1875. He included the picture alongside a letter to his brother Theo which read 'It’s a view of Streatham Common, a large, grass-covered area with oak trees and broom. It had rained in the night, and the ground was soggy here and there and the young spring grass fresh and green'.

== The Rookery ==
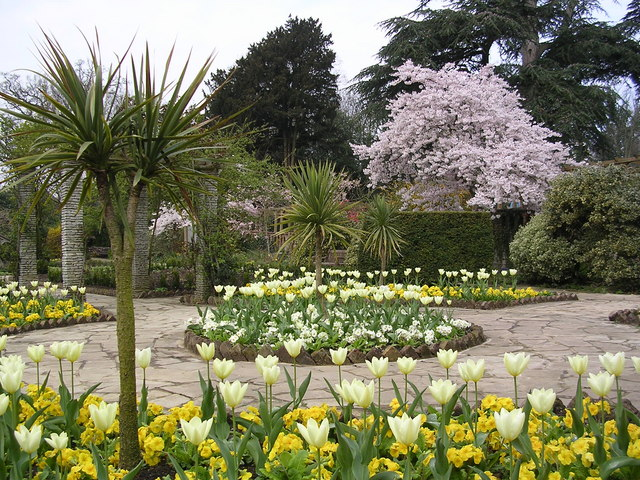
The Rookery

Adjacent to the historic common, there is a formal garden, The Rookery, formerly the grounds of a large house that housed visitors to one of Streatham's historic mineral wells. The Rookery is well known for its old cedar trees in the main garden. There is also a rock garden - with a cascade and lower water garden dominated by giant Gunnera. A series of walled gardens were created in part of the former kitchen gardens, including an Old English Garden and a White Garden - which predates the more famous garden in the same style at Sissinghurst Castle.

The remaining parts of the kitchen gardens, which had been used as a council plant nursery, but had been abandoned for twenty years, are now managed by Streatham Common Community Garden for community food growing, and are open to the public on most Sundays. The gently sloping lawns of The Rookery are used as an open-air theatre in the summer.

The Rookery and the adjacent Hilly Four Acres field was purchased by public subscription in 1911 to save the site from residential development, presented to the London County Council, and opened as a public park in 1913. The south east end of Streatham Common and The Rookery abut Norwood Grove within the London Borough of Croydon. The appeal committee that had bought The Rookery was reformed in 1923 to save Norwood Grove from development, and there is now an almost continuous series of green spaces along the ridge line from Streatham to Crystal Palace.

The Rookery is listed at Grade II, on the Register of Historic Parks and Gardens of Special Historic Interest in England.

== Management ==
A Management Advisory Committee (MAC) was set up in 1996 for the conservation of Streatham Common and The Rookery, resulting in the designation of the nature reserve and subsequent detailed habitat management plans. A separate Friends of Streatham Common group promotes events on the Common and in The Rookery, including an annual kite festival. The MAC's functions have been carried out by the Friends group since 2011.

The Streatham Common Co-operative (SCCoop) was set up by members of the Friends to provide local management of the Common that would provide greater local accountability than the borough-wide parks maintenance contracts. After several years preparation, management of The Rookery transferred to SCCoop in 2015. After Lambeth budget cuts threatened closure of the paddling pool, SCCoop accepted responsibility for managing the pool from Summer 2016 and the associated fund-raising. During 2017, SCCoop has also taken on conservation work in the nature reserve areas of the Common. Following the 2016 "in-sourcing" of Lambeth's parks maintenance from Veolia to a new Lambeth Landscapes DSO, plans for a further transfer of maintenance functions have been deferred.

The London Wildlife Trust is currently working with Lambeth Council and the Friends of Streatham Common to improve the site for wildlife, as a part of The Great North Wood Project.

In 2010, Streatham Common was saved from the threat of a "temporary" ice rink being built on it while Tesco redeveloped the former Streatham ice rink by a vigorous local campaign under the umbrella group 'Hands Off Our Common'.

== See also ==
- Streatham Common railway station
- Streatham-Croydon RFC
