= Joseph Edward Nuttgens =

German stained glass designer in England (1892–1982)

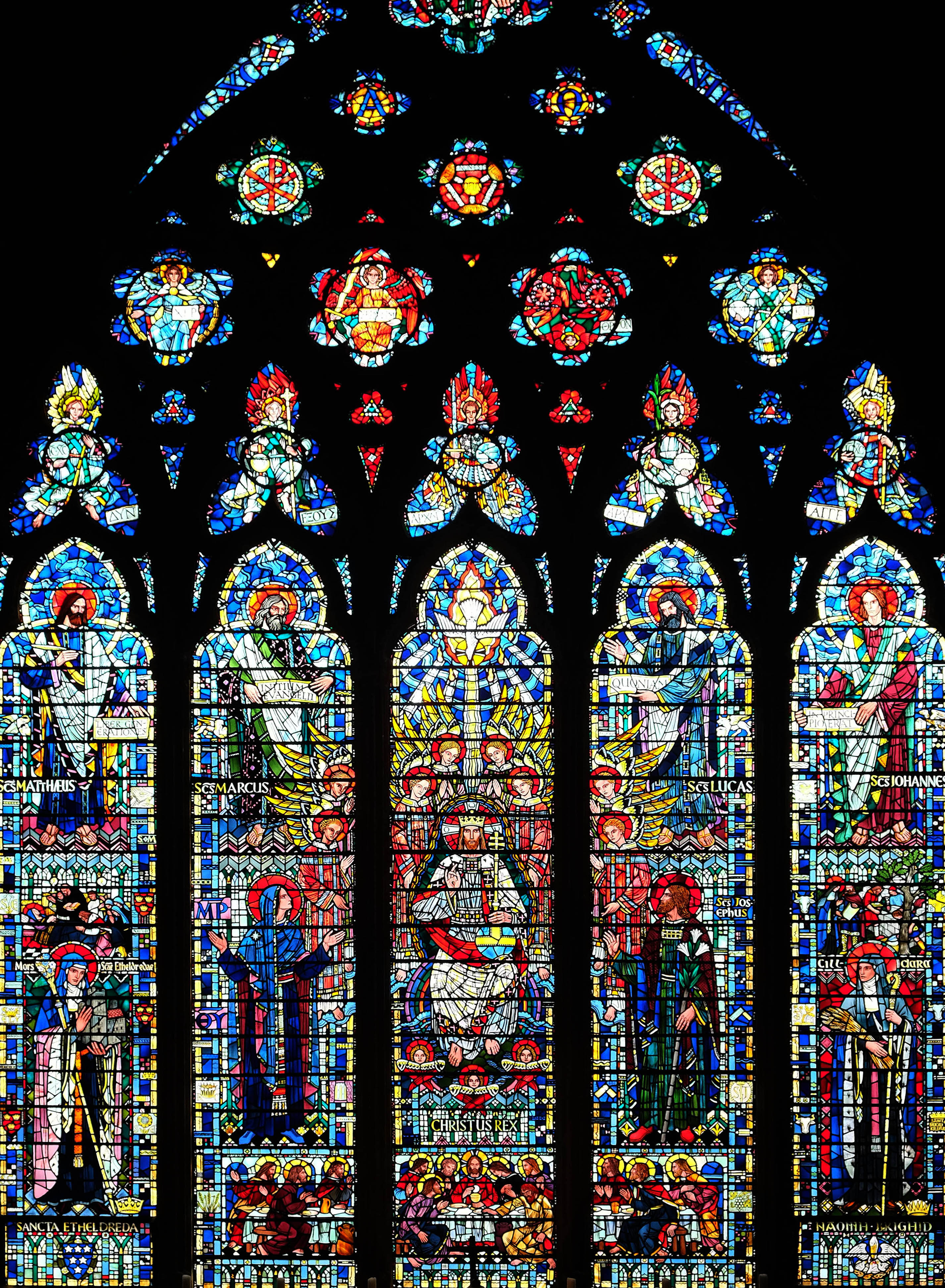
East window. St Etheldreda's Roman Catholic Church, Ely Place, London. Designed by Joseph Edward Nuttgens and installed in 1952.

Joseph Edward (Eddie) Nuttgens (1892 – 1982), in Germany spelt Nüttgens, was a stained glass designer in England who worked mainly on church windows.

== Early life ==
Nuttgens was born in Aachen, the eldest child of six born to a German tailor's cutter, Heinrich/Henry Nuttgens, and an English mother, Teresa Mary Canham. His father's cousins included the brothers Theodor and Heinrich Nüttgens, painters of largely religious subjects. The family moved to London in 1895. Nuttgens left school in 1906, aged 14 years, and learnt drawing in evening classes at Harrow Technical College and School of Art (now part of the University of Westminster). After a couple of jobs involving drawing and stencil cutting, his first job in stained glass was with Arthur Orr, for whom he was his first assistant in a new studio, and for whom he worked for five years. In 1911, aged nineteen, he began studying under Christopher Whall at the Central School of Arts and Crafts in Southampton Row, Bloomsbury, now the Central School of Art and Design, and from Whall he developed the idea that the design and craftsmanship of a piece of art should be executed so far as possible by one person, within a 'living tradition'. In this respect, Nuttgens was influenced by the philosophy and style of Edward Burne-Jones, William Morris, and other members of the Arts and Crafts Movement.

== Career ==
After completing his training, Nuttgens worked at Mary Lowndes and Alfred Drury's Glass House in Fulham under Karl Parsons and Martin Travers. In addition to having the talent and skill to create whole works of his own, he was also able to adapt other people's drawings for translation into works of stained glass, to produce designs for other glassmakers, including James Powell and Sons, and to build glass works designed by other people, including Herbert Hendrie. He then moved to Chipping Campden in Gloucestershire to work for Paul Woodroffe and then to Cobbler's Hill in the Chiltern Hills. Later, he moved to North Dean, near Princes Risborough, Buckinghamshire, before setting up his own studio at Piggott's Hill near High Wycombe, Buckinghamshire.

By the outbreak of the First World War, Nuttgens had been appointed as Head of the Stained Glass Department of the Royal College of Art, but because he had a German father and had been born in Germany, he was interned during the war. In 1918, despite having an English mother and having lived in Britain since the age of three, he was asked to resign from his position at the Royal College.

Chipping Campden was the home of many artists and craftsmen, and Piggott's Hill was associated with many artists who, like Nuttgens, were Roman Catholics. It was near the studio where Eric Gill lived in later life, and through Gill's influence Nuttgens developed an interest in Catholic Distributism, an economic philosophy extolling the virtues of small enterprises and self-sufficiency. The church of St Peter, Gorleston, Norfolk, the only church designed by Gill, completed just before his death in 1937, contains an East Window made by Nuttgens and installed in 1963. Nuttgens was also associated with the Art Workers Guild, based on the precepts of the Arts and Crafts Movement, and the Warham Guild, which was dedicated to the production of church decorations and ornaments and was a Fellow of the British Society of Master Glass Painters. Nuttgens was an important influence on other stained glass makers including John Piper and Patrick Reyntiens, whose partnership began in his studio and Gilbert Sheedy, who made a window for St Andrew's Church, High Wycombe in 1948 and another for Our Lady of the Angels Church, Nuneaton in 1949 in the style of Nuttgens. Sheedy subsequently set up a studio in South Weston, Oxfordshire and made several windows in Holy Trinity Church, Prestwood in 1970. Reyntiens described his teacher, Nuttgens, as 'the best painter on glass of his own and subsequent generations'.

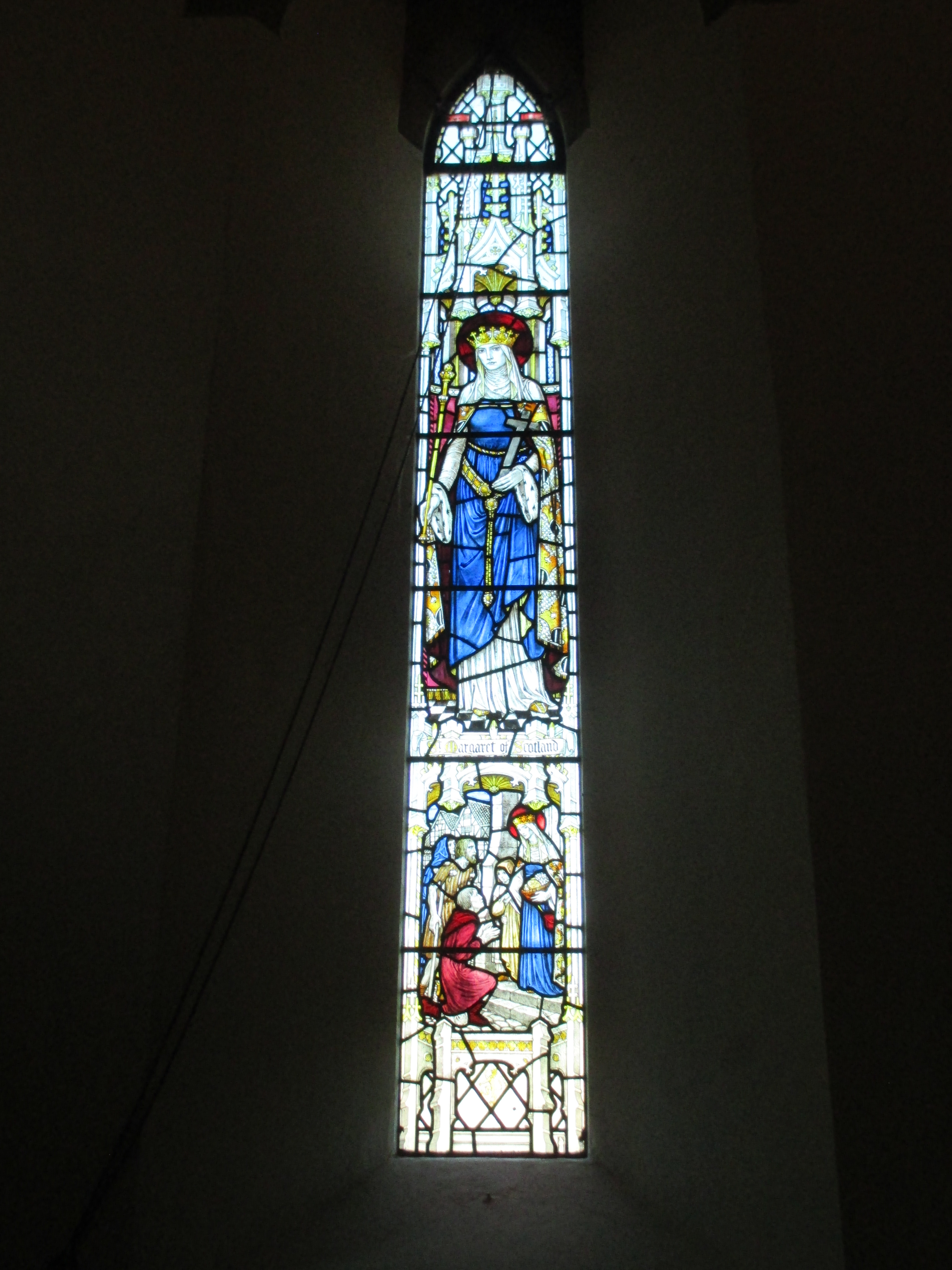
North nave, sixth window, St Mark's Church, Staplefield, Sussex

Nuttgens had a long career, producing about 300 stained glass windows entirely by his own hand, as well as countless drawings, designs and glass work for other artists. Most of his windows were for British churches, with a few being for churches all over the world. About two thirds were for Anglican churches, the remainder being for Roman Catholic churches. His work was coherent over time although his style showed considerable development across his long career. His work from the beginning of his professional life at the end of the First World War to near the beginning of the Second World War carries traces of the style, as well as the philosophy, of the Arts and Crafts Movement, see for example, windows in Nottingham Roman Catholic Cathedral (installed 1948) and St Teresa's Roman Catholic Church, Beaconsfield, Buckinghamshire (1938-1944). During the Second World War there was little opportunity to work in stained glass and from time to time Nuttgens was obliged to take on manual labour. After the Second World War, there was more demand for stained glass, especially for War Memorials and other post-war regeneration projects. These projects included, for example, replacing the windows in the bomb-damaged St Etheldreda's Roman Catholic Church in Ely Place, London (1952) where Nuttgens made the large East window and his colleague, Charles F. Blakeman, made the side windows. When viewing its installation, Bernard Rackham (then curator of the Victoria and Albert Museum) described this East Window as an 'excellent illustration of the adaptation to modern ideas of a superb medieval art'. Some of Nuttgens post-war work, such as a window depicting the Pentecost in the south aisle of the parish church of Saint Peter and Saint Paul, Ormskirk in Lancashire (1953) and the south window in St Andrew's Parish Church, Soham, Cambridgeshire (1957) had a bold but colourful simplicity which indicated considerable progression from his pre-war style. Nuttgens gained an international reputation and made windows for a number of churches abroad including St John's Cathedral in Hong Kong (1958). He replaced the windows which had originally been created by William Morris's firm but which were destroyed during the Japanese Occupation of Hong Kong. A few weeks before his death in 1982, Nuttgens completed the designs for a work based entirely on wild flowers which had been commissioned by Linda McCartney (first wife of Paul McCartney). The work was completed by his son, Joe Ambrose Nuttgens.

== Personal life ==
He married Kathleen Mary Clarke in 1924 and they had five children; she died in 1937. Nuttgens married Daphne Reid in 1940, sister of ‘The Colditz Story' author Pat Reid, and they had eight more children. Joseph E Nuttgens was the father of Patrick Nuttgens, architect and academic; Joseph Ambrose Nuttgens, stained glass designer; John Nuttgens, ceramicist; Susan Nuttgens, ceramicist; Alice Nuttgens, saddler and leather worker. He was also the grandfather of the cinematographer Giles Nuttgens, the composer Sandy Nuttgens, the broadcaster Peg Alexander and 41 further grandchildren, among them, artists, musicians, chefs, broadcasters, entrepreneurs, and naturalists.

After his father's death, a son, Joseph Ambrose Nuttgens, continued as a stained glass designer at North Dean and at Piggott's Hill.

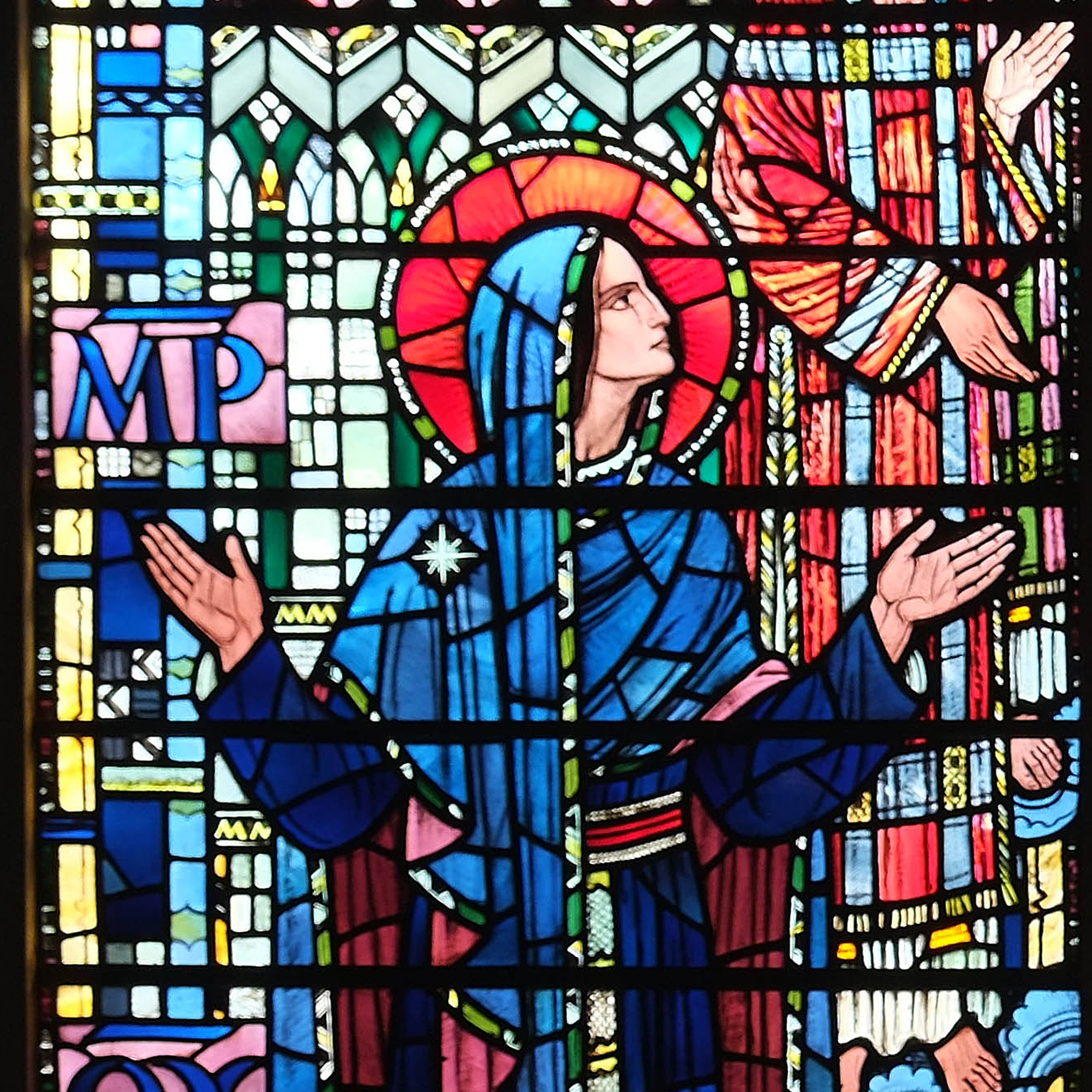
JE Nuttgens Left Light (Detail), East Window, St Etheldreda's Church, Ely Place, London.

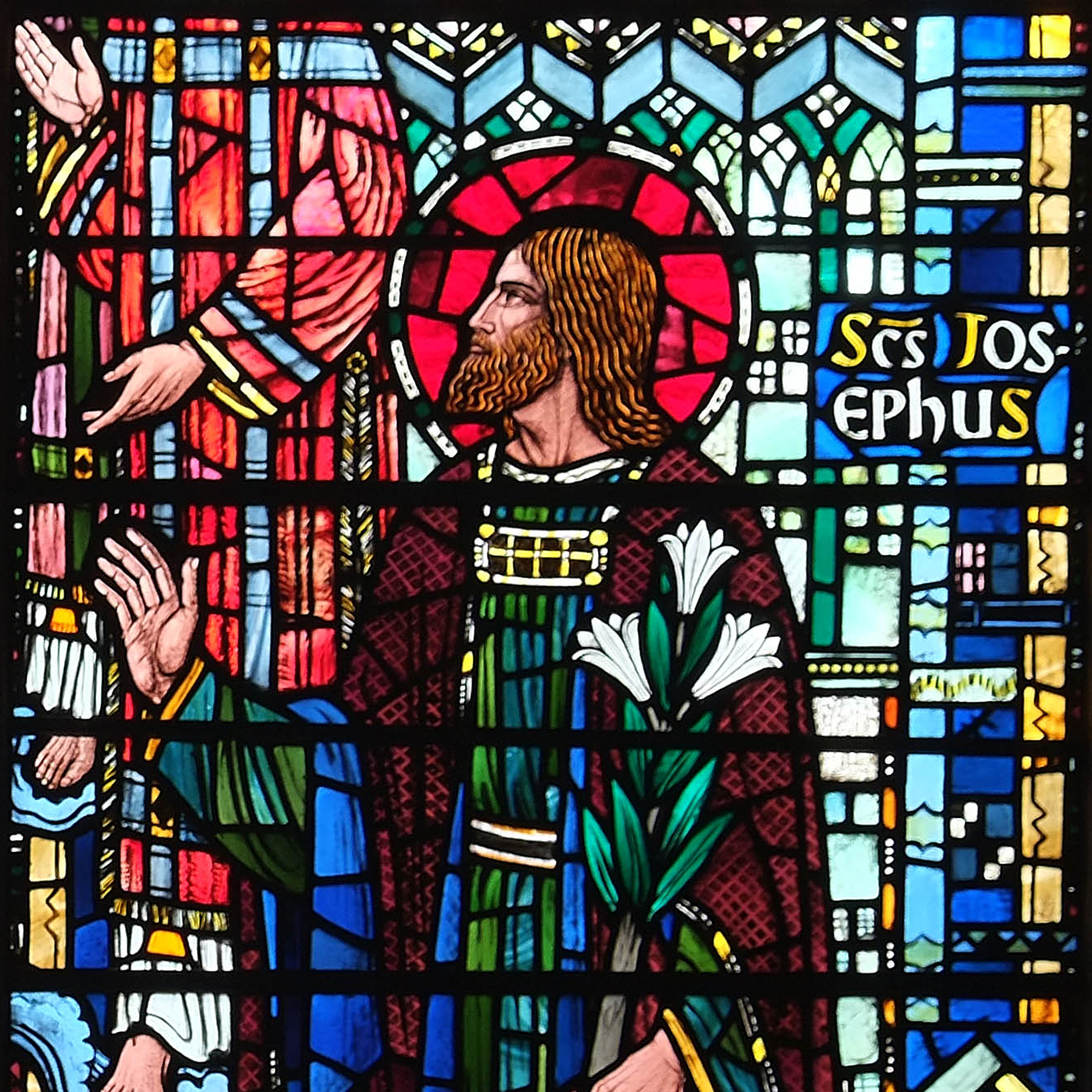
JE Nuttgens Right Light (Detail). East Window, St Etheldreda's Church, Ely Place, London.

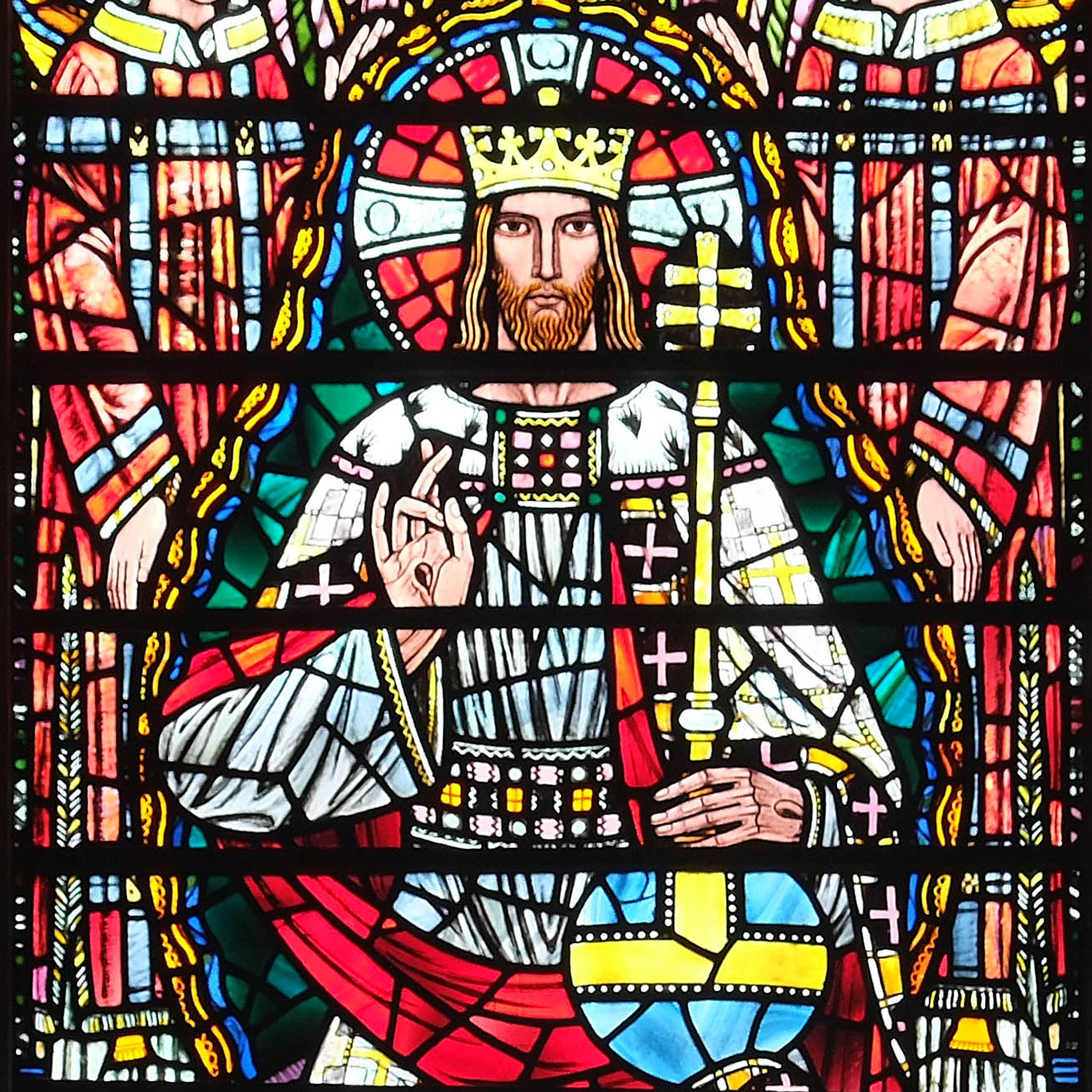
JE Nuttgens. Side Light (Detail), East Window, St Etheldreda's Church, Ely Place, London

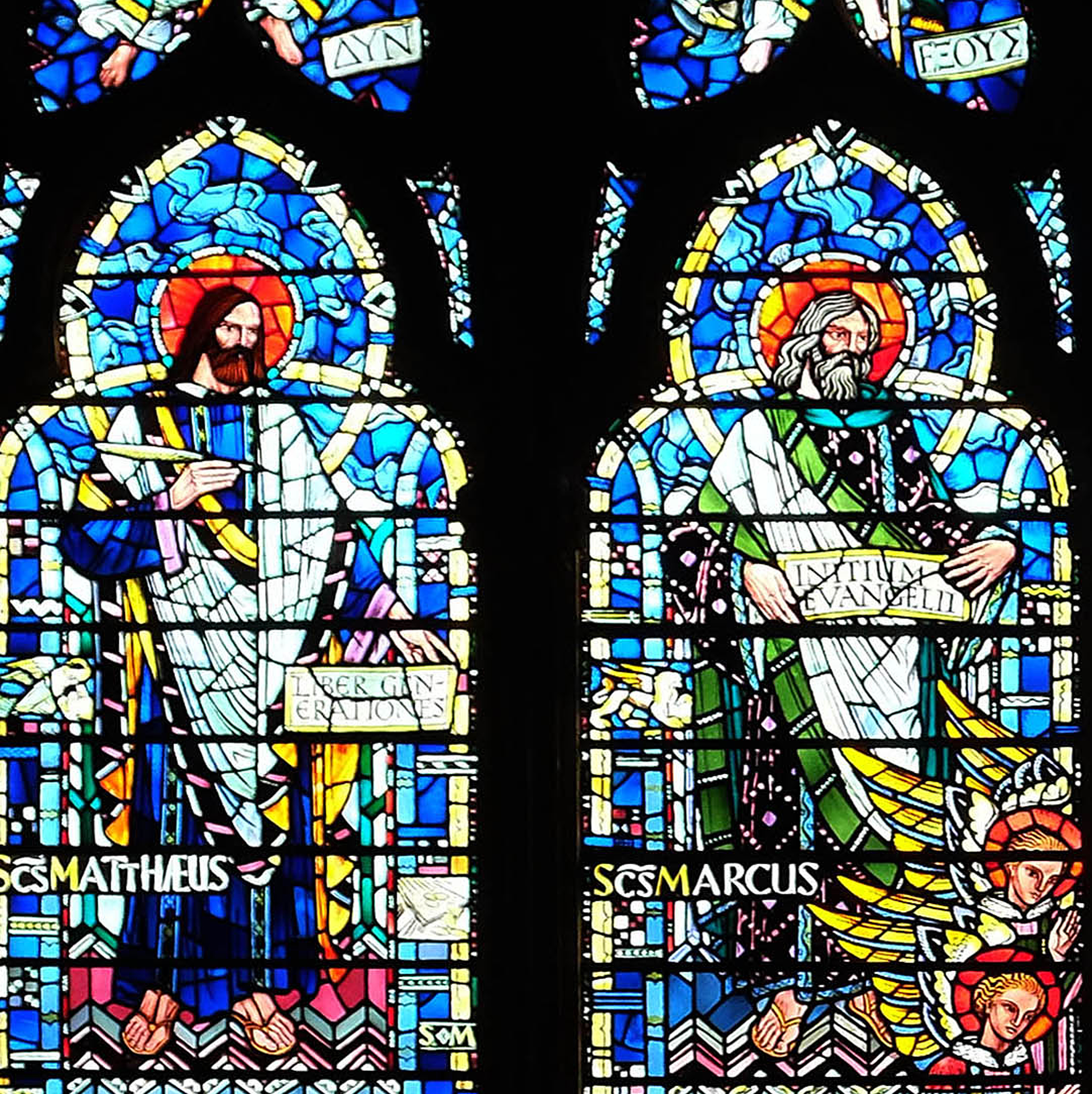
JE Nuttgens, Top Left Light (Detail), East Window, St Etheldreda's Church, Ely Place, London

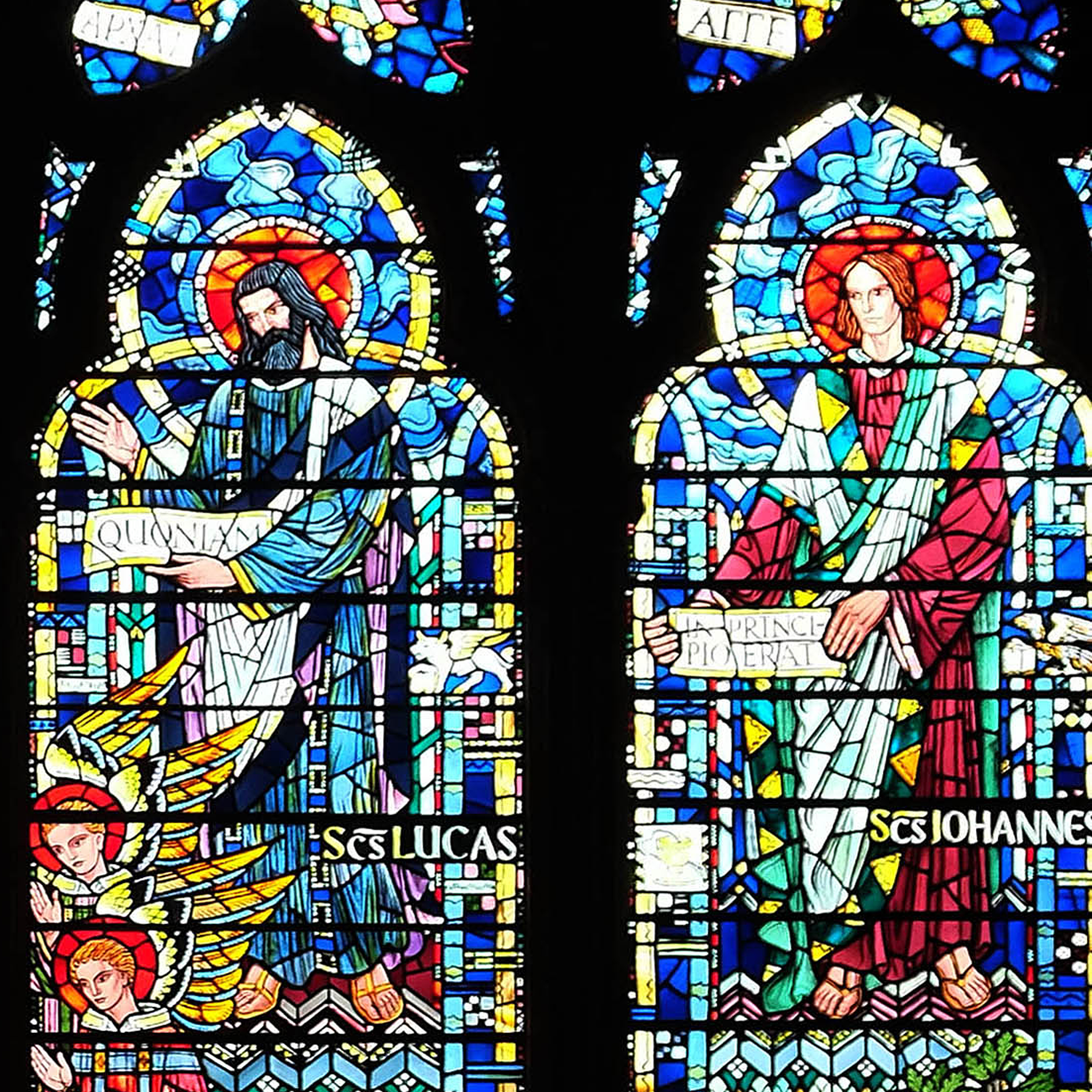
JE Nuttgens, Top Right Light (Detail), East Window, St Etheldreda's Church, Ely Place, London.

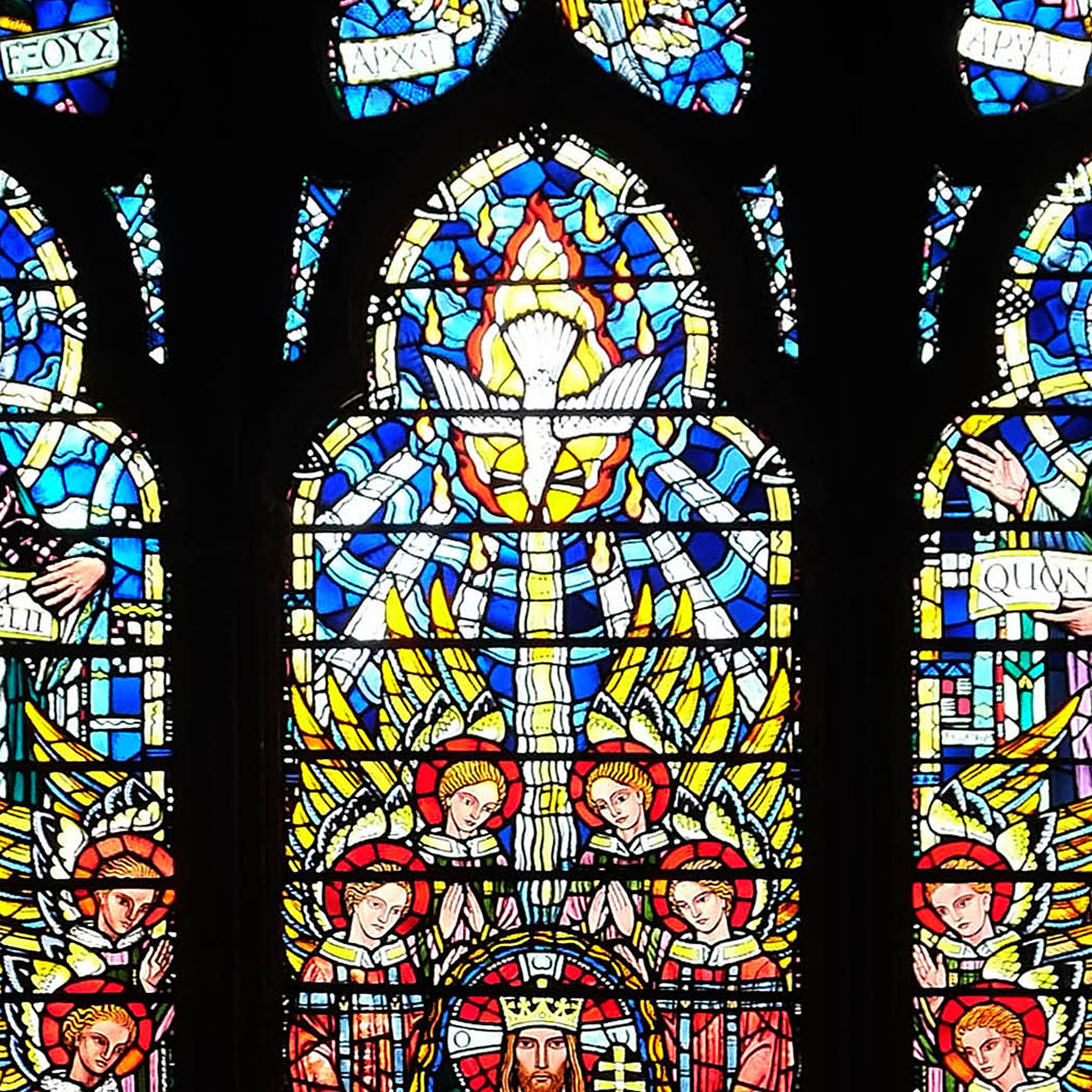
JE Nuttgens, Top Central Light (Detail), East Window, St Etheldreda's Church, Ely Place, London.
