= Norwood School, London =

The Norwood School
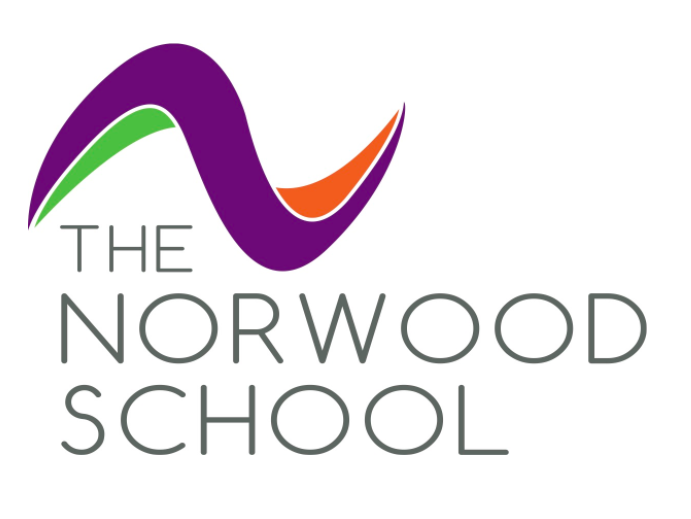

Location
- Crown Dale; West Norwood, London, SE19 3NY; England; 51.4228°N 0.0996°W

Information
- Type: Community Comprehensive
- Established: 1958
- Local authority: Lambeth
- Department for Education URN: 100624 Tables
- Ofsted: Reports
- Chair: Russell Hunter
- Co-Headteachers: Richard Cole and Niki Clemenger
- Gender: Mixed
- Age: 11 to 18
- Enrolment: c.700
- Colour: purple black
- Website: http://www.thenorwoodschool.org/

The Norwood School is a co-educational community school at the south end of the London Borough of Lambeth, for girls and boys aged 11–18. The school is a specialist Performing and Visual Arts College. From September 2007, the school admitted boys for the first time as it changed its status from a single sex girls' school to a co-educational community school. Its pupils travel from across the local education authority mainly from Brixton, Streatham and Vauxhall and a small proportion from neighbouring boroughs.

== History ==
Norwood School for Girls was established in 1958 as a secondary school for girls aged between 11 and 16 by the London County Council. The school was originally based in Gipsy Road in West Norwood housed in a Victorian building built for the 1875 establishment of a London School Board school. It has always therefore been a quite separate institution from the Norwood School of Industry which dominated Elder Road, West Norwood during most of the 19th century. The original school uniform colour was maroon. It became Norwood school for Girls and Boys in 2007.

Although the buildings on Gipsy Road were originally designed to hold a large number of pupils (up to 1000) the premises were deemed to be insufficient to house the two schools during the 1960s and it was agreed that another site would have to be found to at least accommodate the senior year groups.

Building began of a new Upper School on Crown Dale, near the junction with Elder Road in West Norwood, opposite Norwood Park, a relatively short distance from the school’s current site on Gipsy Road, which ran down another side of the same park. In 1971, on 21 April, years three to six moved to the brand new and much vaulted Upper School, whilst the first and second years remained in Gipsy Road in what was now called the Lower School, sharing this with a primary school, known as Norwood Park Primary School. The only piece of furniture allowed in the new building from the old was the kneehole desk from the Head’s room in Gipsy Road. The new site also had grounds that had been planted with a multitude of shrubs and flowers.

A very clear attempt was made at this time to impress upon students and commentators alike that the name of the school was Norwood or Norwood School, to reflect its comprehensive nature and move away from the secondary modern nomenclature. However, the colloquial references to Norwood Girls' or Norwood Girls' School were as old as the school and remained. Eventually, the first and second years moved to the site on Crown Dale in the late 1980s where the school remains to the present day.

In September 2005 the school was awarded Specialist Status in Performing and Visual Arts, areas in which the school had a tradition from its earliest times and reflected in the careers of its more illustrious alumni.

From September 2007, the school’s admittance of boys as well as girls firmly relegated the Norwood Girl’s tag as the school changes its status from a single sex girls' school to a co-educational community school. This change has been reported as being in response to the needs and demands of Lambeth parents.

== Education ==
The school originally provided five and six year courses in a variety of subjects. The first three years a general course was taken to provide a good foundation. From the fourth year three courses were available. The Academic: leading to the General Certificate of Education examination; The Commercial, including general clerical work, shorthand and typing, all leading to the relevant public examinations; and Technical leading to public examinations involving Housecraft, needle trades, pre-nursing, woodwork and metalwork. Outside of the academic the school had a number of societies and of particular pride were the choral and orchestral music, drama and dancing activities, a trend that continues today in the school’s designation as a Specialist in Performing and Visual Arts. The sports played were cricket and tennis in the summer, hockey and netball in the winter.

Today, the school teaches the national curriculum but its specialist status in Performing and Visual Arts (awarded in September 2005) means that younger students receive weekly lessons in art, dance, drama and music, taught by specialist teachers in state-of-the-art studios. The school selects 10% of its year seven intake based on Arts aptitude, selected by audition / workshop, and interview. The school has benefited from an extensive building programme, and is equipped with a wide range of Visual Arts facilities; drama studios; a suite of music rooms, including a recording studio; and is one of the only schools in Lambeth to have the benefit of two purpose built mirrored dance studios; as well as a fully equipped theatre. Older students continue in one or more expressive arts subjects at key stage four, and students can continue their studies in the sixth form, as part of an Arts pathway, or in combination with other academic and vocational subjects. Outside of the arts and strong core curriculum subjects, students are offered courses including Health and Social Care, Business Studies, Psychology, Sociology, Film Studies, Media Studies and Government and Politics. The range of subject options in the sixth form means that The Norwood School also increasingly takes new students transferring from other schools in the area.

== Uniform ==
In 1971, when the school moved to Crown Dale, a new air force blue uniform was chosen as part of the range of ideas to mark a new start for the school. This remained the colour of the uniform until September 1989.

In 1989 the uniform was changed to navy blue and in 2007 the purple uniform was adopted for years 7-11. This uniform also features a velcro tie with orange, blue, green and purple stripes overlapping. Sixth-form students do not wear uniform.

== Student Council and Organisation ==
Every tutor group has a Form Captain and a Vice-Captain who act as the front line of contact for the tutor group. There is then a Student Council containing representatives from every Form Group in the school. The school also operates a system of having Head Girl or Head Boy who serve a term of office that lasts for a year, marking the student in question out as exemplary in all areas.

== Head Teachers ==
- Mrs L. A. Gee
- Dr Jean Lawrence: to 1969
- Mary Scott: 1969 to 1981
- George Varnava: 1981 to 1994
- Ms Barbara Williams
- Denise Webster: to present

Niki Clemenger and Richard Cole are the current co-headteachers

== Notable former pupils ==
- Claire Benedict – Actress
- Toheeb Jimoh - Actor
- Lisa Maffia – Singer with the group So Solid Crew
- Caron Wheeler – Singer with the band Soul II Soul
- Elliot Steel - Comedian
