= Elmgreen School =

The Elmgreen School

Location
- Elmcourt Road; West Norwood, London, SE27 9BZ; England; 51.4388°N 0.1028°W

Information
- Type: Academy
- Established: 2007
- Founder: Parent Promoters Foundation
- Local authority: Lambeth
- Trust: Great Northwood Education Trust
- Department for Education URN: 144309 Tables
- Ofsted: Reports
- Headteacher: Dominic Bergin
- Gender: Coeducational
- Age: 11 to 18
- Enrolment: 1073
- Houses: Szabo, Besant, James, Wilberforce
- Colour: Green
- Website: www.the-elmgreen-school.org.uk

The Elmgreen School is a coeducational secondary school and sixth form located in the West Norwood area of the London Borough of Lambeth, England. It was the first Parent Promoted secondary school to be created in the UK under the School Standards and Framework Act 1998.

== History ==
The school was created to address a major shortfall in the number of secondary school places in the London Borough of Lambeth. Following a public consultation in October 2003, a group of 40 parents formed The Parent Promoters Foundation (PPF). Working in partnership with Lambeth Local Authority, the PPF successfully campaigned to raise the necessary £25 million funding via the Building Schools for the Future programme.

The PPF worked with DfES ministers, educationalist's and the local authority to write the formal proposals and design the ethos for the school. Formal approval by the Schools Organisation Committee was given in July 2005 to establish a mixed non-denominational school for 1100 students to open in September 2007.

A governing body with a parental majority was formed in October 2005, and they appointed Asma Mansuri as the first headteacher of The Elmgreen School in February 2006.

The first year intake of 180 students spent two years in an Ellis Williams Architects-redesigned Victorian primary school in Gipsy Road, West Norwood which was originally built for the 1875 establishment of a London School Board school known as Gipsy Road School. The buildings on Gipsy Road were originally designed to hold a large number of pupils (up to 1000). However, this was pushed to the limits when in 1958 Norwood School for Girls was established as a secondary school for girls aged between 11 and 16 by the London County Council and housed on the same site. Norwood School for Girls began moving to a new site in 1971, and the site was eventually completely taken over by a school for younger pupils once again, which would for many years be known as Norwood Park Primary School. This school was closed in 2002 due to falling numbers and the site was then used as the temporary home for Crown Lane Primary School whilst that school's buildings were rebuilt. When Crown Lane Primary School moved back to Crown Lane the buildings became vacant, ready for the redevelopment to prepare them for The Elmgreen School's occupancy. With the relocation of The Elmgreen School to its permanent site in 2009, Gipsy Road became part of the Kingswood School Foundation.

In July 2010 former Elmgreen Deputy Head John Wilkinson was appointed as Headteacher. The library and learning resource centre was renamed 'The Mansuri Library' after his predecessor. John Wilkinson left the school in April 2014, and Dominic Bergin was appointed as Headteacher.

In May 2017 the school converted to academy status and is now part of the Great Northwood Education Trust.

== Buildings ==
Working with local community, primary school children and The Sorrell Foundation, the PPF carried out extensive consultation on the architectural brief for the new school, and following a closed competition the architects Scott Brownrigg and David Adjaye Associates were selected to design the school. Construction began in February 2008 by Carillion and was completed in September 2009. The location is on Elmcourt Road in West Norwood on a site formerly occupied by the Elm Court School, a school for Special Educational Needs.

Elm Court School moved to the redeveloped Strand Centre (the buildings of the former Strand School) on Elm Park in Tulse Hill. Thus, Elmgreen School is located on Elmcourt Road whilst Elm Court School is located on Elm Park.
