= Norwood Park (London) =

Park in West Norwood, London

Coordinates: 51°25′30″N 0°5′38″W

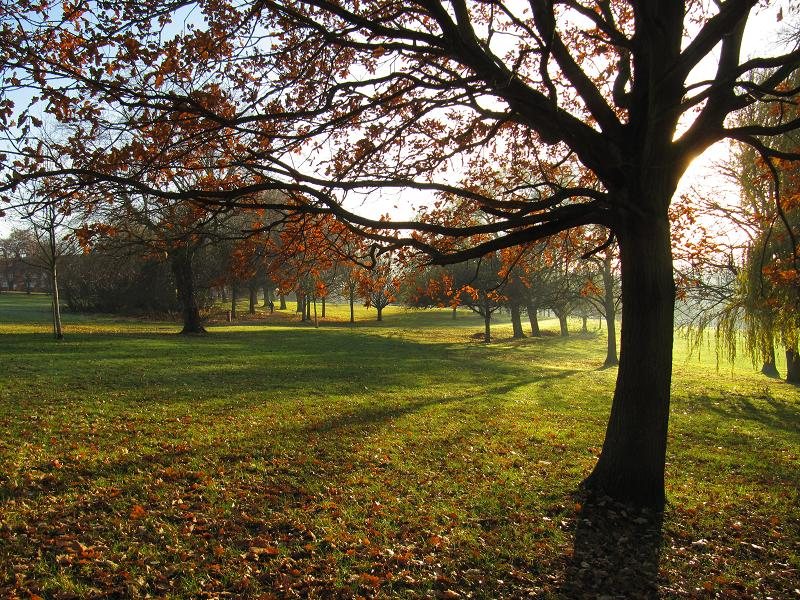
- Interactive map of Norwood Park
- Location: London, SE19; United Kingdom
- Operator: Lambeth Council
- Public transit: Gipsy Hill
- Website: https://www.lambeth.gov.uk/parks/norwood-park

Norwood Park is a 13.3-hectare (33-acre) park located in West Norwood. The park is bordered by Elder Road, Central Hill and Salter's Hill in South East London. The park is managed by Lambeth Council and the community group known as “Friends of Norwood Park”. It sits on one of the highest points in Lambeth. For a number of years, the concrete sports pitch has been used by Flatland BMX riders who refer to it as 'The Green Mile' or 'TGM' for short.

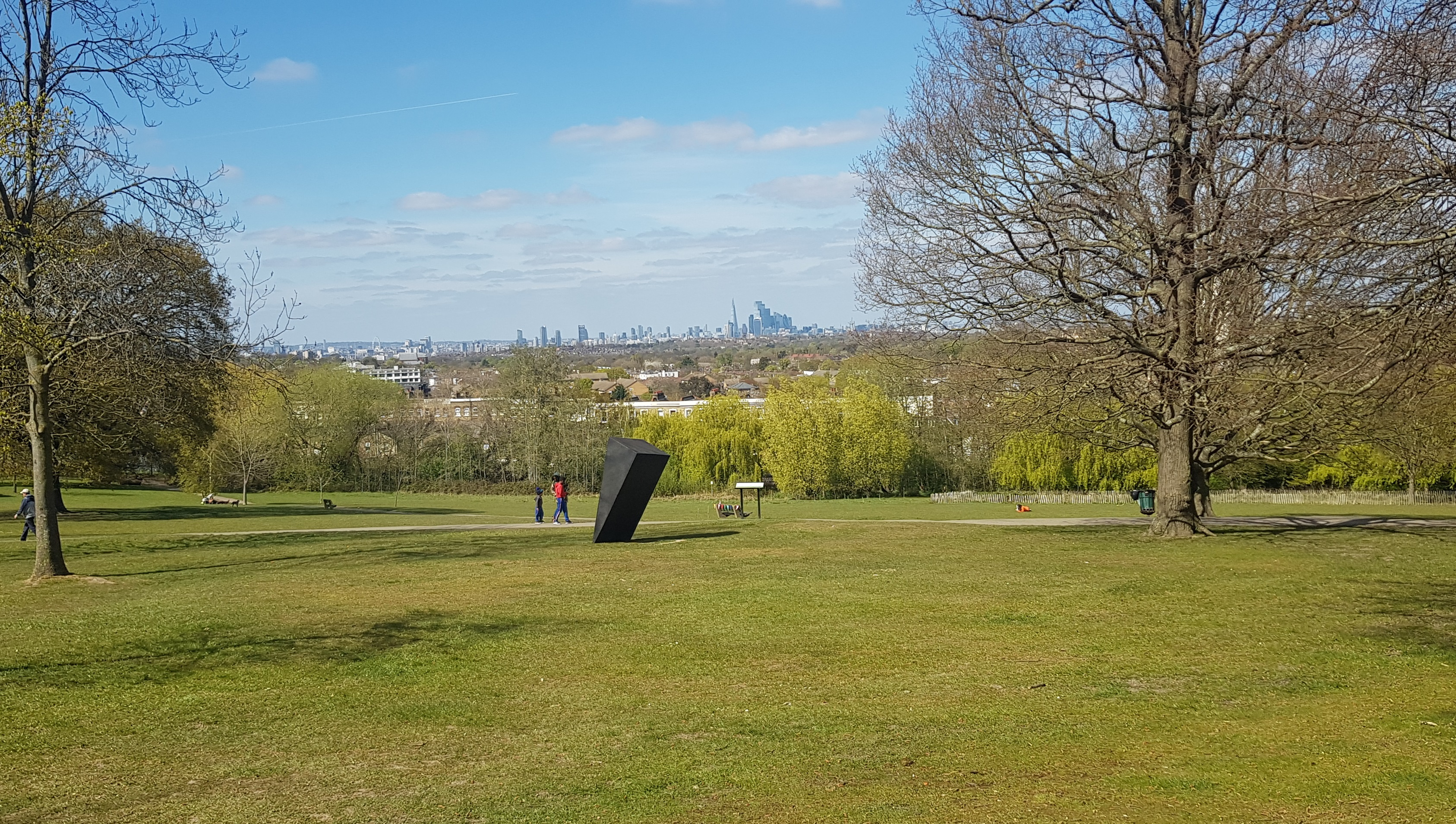
View of Norwood Park with the London skyline

== History ==
In the 13th century, the Great North Wood, in addition to being a food source, was "a vital supplier of timber for the Royal Dockyards at Deptford". At one point the land was called Elder Hole Coppice (giving the name to nearby Elder Road). As the wood was gradually lost to city development in the early 19th Century, the remaining 33 acres of green space was finally bought from the then owners the Ecclesiastical Commissioners (paid for by Lambeth Council, London County Council and community donations) in 1903 to develop the park for local residents, officially opening 14 June 1911.

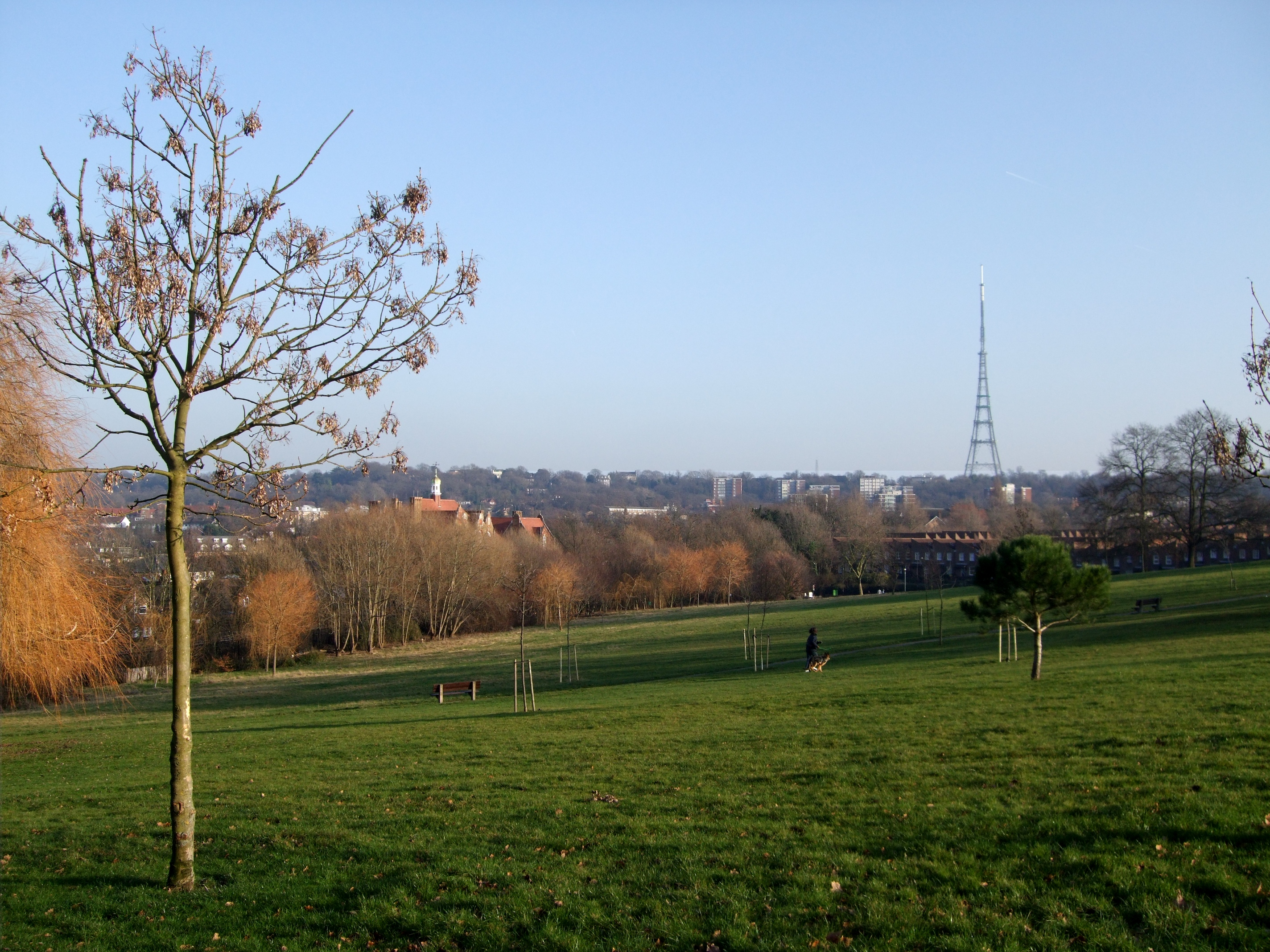
View of Crystal Palace from the park

The river Effra also ran through the park, at its southern point. Three eighteenth century cottages were at a point on the park land, separated behind Elder Road by the Effra and a bridge. The houses were slowly removed as the park formalised, one remained and kept as a storehouse until 1942 when it burnt down.

During World War 2 an outdoor theatre was erected to entertain locals, pierrot troupes would be a common performance as people in the city would be less able to go to the seaside.

In 2011 the park celebrated its centenary.

== Facilities ==
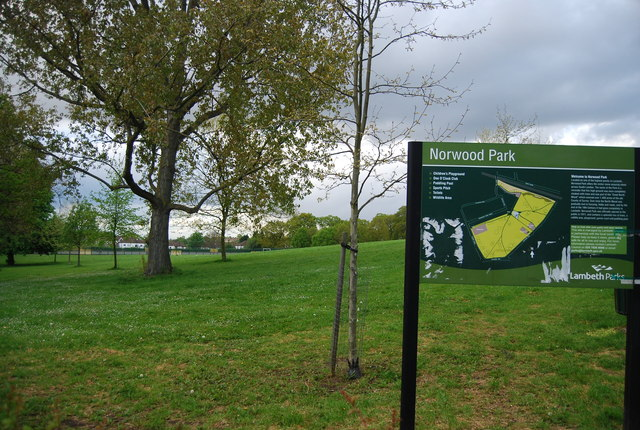
Sign with map in the park

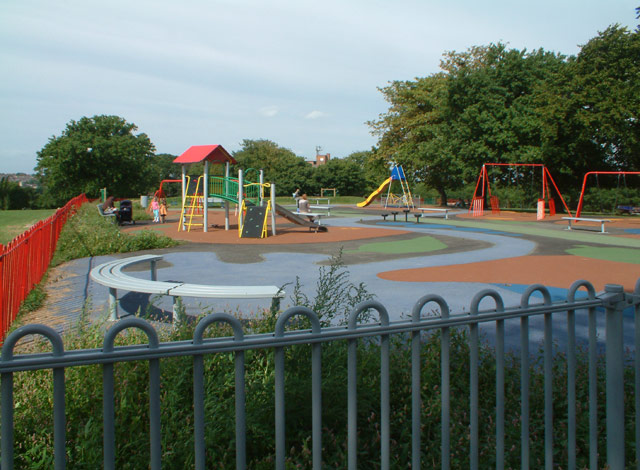
Children's playground

There is a BMX track, hungry hippos cafe, two playgrounds and panoramic view of the city of London which can be enjoyed at benches at the top of a central hill in the park.

There is a traditional children's playground with multi-coloured equipment for smaller children. Salter's Hill playground (which had a more detailed adventure playground layout) has been largely dismantled and there was a public consultation for development in 2022.

== Friends of Norwood Park ==
The park has an active Friends group who work with the community to influence changes and development to facilities in the park. Membership is £5 annually.
