= John Sutton Nettlefold =

British industrialist and entrepreneur

John Sutton Nettlefold (23 September 1792 – 12 April 1866) was a British industrialist and entrepreneur.

== Early life and family ==
Nettlefold was born in London. Nettlefold was a Unitarian; he married a co-religionist, Martha Chamberlain (1794–1866). Hers was a family of Birmingham manufacturers and politicians: her brother's son, Joseph Chamberlain (1836–1914), was a radical Liberal and a leading imperialist. They lived in The Grove, Highgate.

They had three sons: Edward John Nettlefold (1820–1878), Joseph Henry Nettlefold (1827–1881) and Frederick Nettlefold (1833–1913). One of Edward John's sons was named after him, John Sutton Nettlefold, who was a social reformer.

== Career ==
In 1823, he opened a hardware store at 54 High Holborn. This was followed in 1826 by a workshop to make woodscrews based in Sunbury-on-Thames. The Sunbury factory was powered by a waterwheel and Nettlefold saw the importance of motive power when he took advantage of steam power in a new factory in Baskerville Place, off Broad Street, Birmingham. He renamed the business Nettlefold and Sons, Ltd., and it expanded rapidly in London and Birmingham.

In 1854, Nettlefold acquired the opportunity to purchase a licence to manufacture to a U.S. patent for a novel woodscrew. The licence, and the establishment of a new factory, demanded an investment of £ 30,000. Nettlefold sought and obtained the involvement of his brother-in-law as equal partner for an investment of £10,000 and the two established a factory in Smethwick, leaving its management to their sons, Edward John and Joseph Henry Nettlefold, and Joseph Chamberlain.

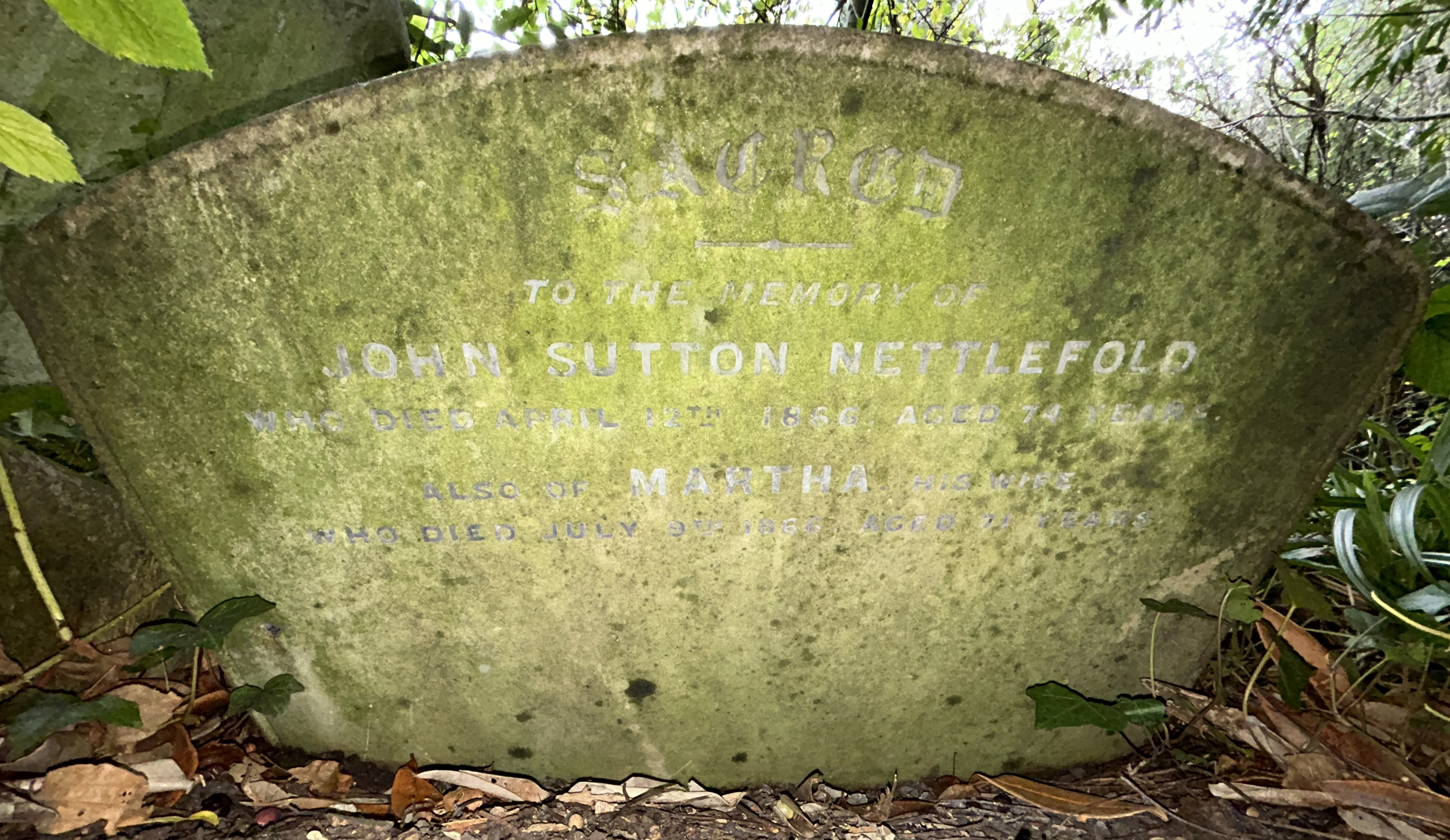
Grave of John Sutton Nettlefold in Highgate Cemetery

In later years, the management of the partnership, Nettlefold and Chamberlain, was passed to Joseph and Frederick Nettlefold, and later was absorbed into Guest, Keen & Nettlefolds, a multinational engineering company headquartered in Redditch.

Nettlefold was buried in the dissenters section of the western side of Highgate Cemetery.

== Bibliography ==
- Jones, E (1987). A History of GKN Volume 1: Innovation and Enterprise 1759–1918. Palgrave Macmillan. ISBN 0-333-34594-0.
- Smith, B.D.M (2004) "Nettlefold, Joseph Henry (1827-1881)", rev., Oxford Dictionary of National Biography, Oxford University Press, accessed 27 July 2005 (subscription, Wikipedia Library access or UK public library membership required)
