= Frederick Nettlefold =

Frederick Nettlefold (6 April 1833 – 1 March 1913) was a British industrialist, one of the Nettlefolds in Guest, Keen and Nettlefolds. He was a leader in the Unitarian Church, ending up as lay president of the international organisation.

He was born in Acton, London to John Sutton Nettlefold, who founded the brass fixing company Nettlefold and Chamberlain with Frederick's cousin Joseph Chamberlain, father of Austen and Neville.

After his father retired and cousin left the business to concentrate on politics, Frederick took over the running of the London part of the business as chairman, while his brother Joseph was sent to Birmingham to manage their new foundry. Nettlefolds Ltd. was launched as a limited company in 1880 and the Nettlefold brothers went on to establish a dominant position the British wood-screw market through many mergers and acquisitions, becoming Guest, Keen and Nettlefolds.

In 1878 Frederick and his wife Mary Catherine moved into Streatham Grove, on its vacation by P&O magnate Arthur Anderson. Their residence is now noted by a blue plaque.

Frederick retired from Nettlefolds in 1893 and helped develop Samuel Courtauld's silk and crepe company. He dedicated much effort to philanthropy. This included donating land for the original public library at Knights Hill West Norwood, which was later commemorated by the name Nettlefold Hall given to a part of its successor in Norwood High Street. He devoted much of his energy to the Unitarian Church, was president of the Sunday School Association and later the British and Foreign Unitarian Association, and was one of the main supporters behind the construction of the 1886 Essex Hall, the headquarters building for the denomination. His daughter Edith was better known as Mrs Sydney Martineau, from 1929 the lay president of the General Assembly of Unitarian and Free Christian Churches, the successor to the organisations her father presided over.

Mary died at Norwood Grove in 1906 followed by Frederick in 1913, and they are buried in West Norwood Cemetery, although their monument is believed to have been destroyed sometime in the 1980s.
