= Joseph Henry Nettlefold =

British businessman

Joseph Henry Nettlefold (19 September 1827 – 22 November 1881) was a British industrialist, the Nettlefold in Guest, Keen & Nettlefolds.

He was born in London to John Sutton Nettlefold who, in 1854, dispatched him to manage the business of Nettlefold and Chamberlain in Birmingham with his brother Edward John and cousin Joseph Chamberlain. The Chamberlains left the firm in 1874 and Edward John died in 1878, leaving effective control of Birmingham manufacturing and engineering to Joseph, and his younger brother Frederick Nettlefold as chairman in London. Nettlefolds Ltd was launched as a limited company in 1880. Nettlefold, by a series of astute mergers and acquisitions, went on to establish a virtual monopoly in the British wood-screw market.

Nettlefold was a sober man whose principal interests were technical. He became a member of the Institution of Mechanical Engineers in 1860. Though both his parents were Unitarian, Nettlefold married a Roman Catholic, Mary Maria Seaborne (born 1835), in 1867. None of their three daughters went on to have any connection with the family business.

Nettlefold died of apoplexy, aged 54, in November 1881 at his Scottish residence, Allean House, near Pitlochry, Perthshire. He bequeathed several paintings by David Cox to the Birmingham Museum & Art Gallery, on condition that it open on Sundays. He left a further £1000 to the King's Heath and Moseley Institute.

Sometime after Nettlefold's death, Nettlefold & Co. was acquired by Arthur Keen's Guest, Keen & Co. to create Guest, Keen and Nettlefold which is, as of 2007, still trading. For many years, this company has been better known as GKN.
