= Sandy Nuttgens =

British composer

Alexander Nuttgens (born 1964) is a British composer and a Professional Member of the Ivors Academy.

He is principally known for scoring television programmes mainly in the realm of children's TV and documentaries. He has scored numerous BAFTA and Royal Television Society winners and nominees including My Parents Are Aliens for Granada, Timelines for October Films and Shakespeare Shorts for the BBC. In 2008 he scored his first feature film 'The Blue Tower'which won Best UK Film at the London Raindance Film Festival.

In children's television he scored the music for Postman Pat SDS, Odo, Floogals, Mixmups, Big & Small, Get Well Soon and Dinopaws. Both Postman Pat and Dinopaws were nominated in the 2014 BAFTA Children's Awards. Nuttgens was awarded two Silver Telly Awards for his work on Odo. Between 2023 and 2026 Nuttgens scored the music for BooSnoo! for Visionality and Sky Kids. Nuttgens was nominated for a BAFTA TV Craft Award in both 2025 and 2026 for his work on BooSnoo!.

In 2007 Nuttgens won an RTS Yorkshire Region Award for Best Music for his score for Terry Jones' Barbarians for Oxford Films and the BBC. He was nominated for RTS Best Music for The Rise and Fall of Tony Blair for Channel4 in 2008, and in 2010 he won an RTS Award for Best Music for 'The Queen in 3D' for Renegade Films.

Between 1995 and 2012 Nuttgens had a long-term relationship as principal composer for Yorkshire's national touring young peoples theatre company, Pilot Theatre. Their break-through production of Lord of the Flies was nominated for a TMA Award in 1999 and won a Manchester Evening News Award for best production in 2001. Recent productions have included the stage premiere of Anne Cassidy's Looking For JJ, and providing the opening show for the 2007 International Indian Film Academy film awards. In 2010 he scored Pilot's much acclaimed touring version of Romeo and Juliet, and co-wrote the title song "Kiss By the Book" with Molly McQueen, daughter of musician Midge Ure.

Nuttgens was a founder member of UK dance duo Skip Raiders, which was signed to Paul Oakenfold and his Perfecto Records label and had a top 50 hit on the UK Singles Chart in 2000 with "Another Day". He also had a writing collaboration with UK garage and reggae singer Sweetie Irie.

In 2004 Nuttgens led the campaign to establish the first ever Parent-Promoted secondary school in the UK, under legislation introduced by the 1997 New Labour Government which allowed parents to work in partnership with local authorities to set up new schools. The parents successfully campaigned for £27M from the Building Schools for the Future fund, which resulted in the opening of The Elmgreen School in 2007. Nuttgens was the school's first Chair of Governors and Chair of the Parent Promoters Foundation, the charitable body set up to found the school. .

Nuttgens is the son of academic and architect Patrick Nuttgens and the grandson of stained-glass artist Joseph Edward Nuttgens. He is married to actress and voice-over artist Claire Lacey and has three children.
