= GKN Automotive =

Manufacturer of driveline components

GKN Automotive Ltd.
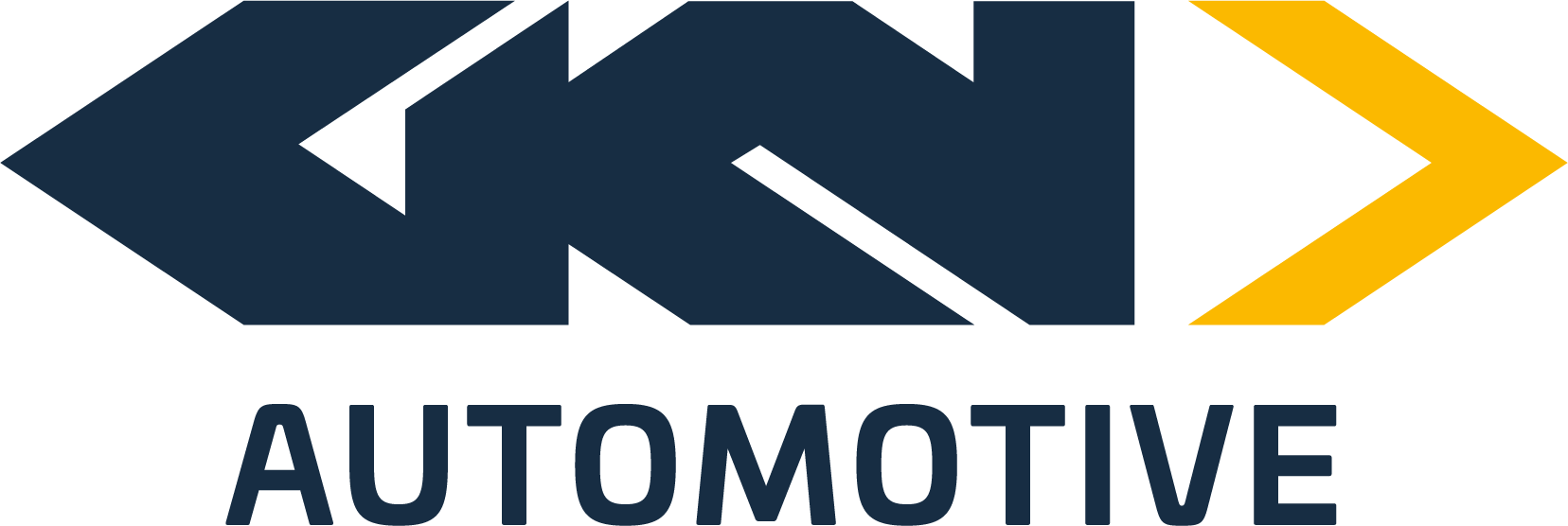
- Company type: Division
- Industry: Automotive
- Headquarters: Birmingham, England, UK
- Area served: Worldwide
- Products: Automotive Components
- Owner: Dowlais Group
- Number of employees: 25,000 (2023)
- Website: www.gknautomotive.com

GKN Automotive is a multinational manufacturer of driveline components, all-wheel drive systems and plug-in hybrid systems for the automotive industry.

It employs around 25,000 people across 47 manufacturing facilities and 6 technology centres in 19 countries.

In 2018, Melrose Industries acquired GKN Ltd and renamed it GKN Automotive. This encompasses both the Driveline and ePowertrain divisions.

GKN Automotive became the world's largest producer of constant-velocity joints (CVJs), which it began manufacturing in the 1960s for early front-wheel drive cars. Its other products include sideshafts, propshafts, modular eDrive systems, multi-mode hybrid transmissions for plug-in hybrid electric vehicles, torque vectoring systems for electric drivelines and a range of all-wheel drive and four-wheel drive systems.

== History ==
GKN, originally known as Guest, Keen & Nettlefolds, first began in 1759 with the establishment of Dowlais Ironworks by Thomas Lewis and Isaac Wilkinson. In the early 19th century, the company was actively involved in the railway boom through its production of iron. This was followed by a shift to steel production in the 1860s. After World War I, GKN diversified into the automotive industry.

In 1966, after being advised GKN Steel would be nationalised for the second time, GKN bought CVJ market leaders Birfield Industries with its subsidiaries Hardy Spicer and Laycock Engineering with their interests and subsidiaries in Europe, Japan and the United States to save its BRD subsidiary. This was the start of the company's globalization. GKN established a manufacturing presence in China in 1988. At the same time, GKN Driveline was investing in and growing its business in India, Brazil and Mexico.

== Bibliography ==
- Jones, Edgar: A History of GKN. Volume One: Innovation & Enterprise 1759-1918. GKN plc (1987)
- Jones, Edgar: A History of GKN. Volume Two: The Growth of a Business 1918-1945. GKN plc (1990)
- GKN plc factsheet: http://www.gkn.com/media/Documents/GKNfactsheet_final.pdf, 12.08.2011
