= Hardy Spicer =

Brand of automotive transmission

Hardy Spicer is a brand of automotive transmission or driveline equipment best known for its mechanical constant velocity universal joint originally manufactured in Britain by Hardy employing patents belonging to US-based Spicer Manufacturing. Hardy and Spicer soon became partners. Later Spicer became Dana Holding Corporation.

Since the commercial success of front wheel drive cars began in the 1960s the industry manufacturing universal joints has grown enormously.

The Hardy Spicer and Laycock Engineering group of businesses, later known as Birfield, have been part of the GKN Driveline group since 1966.

== History ==
Ed. J Hardy Limited was founded and later formed into a limited liability company by Birmingham-born cycle-parts manufacturer Edward John Hardy (1874–1950) in 1903 to import components for British motor manufacturers from France. The French industry was then dominant.

=== Bearings ===
Bound Brook Bearings of Bound Brook, New Jersey sold to Ed J Hardy and Company in 1922 the rights to manufacture their oil-less bearings and oil retaining bearings and sell them in Europe and the British Empire.

=== Flexible coupling ===
Just before the first World War Hardy designed, patented and made a flexible laminated fabric and rubber coupling which soon became standard on British cars and trucks. A licence to manufacture the Hardy flexible coupling in USA was granted to the Thermoid Rubber Company.

=== Mechanical universal joint ===
More powerful engines and higher speeds required a mechanical universal joint. In USA, already with a link to Thermoid, Hardy established a contact with Spicer Manufacturing Corporation of Toledo, Ohio. Spicer took a share of Ed. J Hardy Limited in exchange for British patent rights and all engineering data of the Spicer mechanical joint and in 1926 the name of Ed. J Hardy & Co was changed to Hardy, Spicer and Co Limited.

=== Other businesses ===
The Phosphor Bronze Company was bought in 1937 for its manufacture of high grade non-ferrous castings and the following year Hardy, Spicer elected to make their own forgings in their own forging plant. The plant's name was Forgings and Presswork (Birmingham) Limited. Sheffield's Laycock Engineering also made a flexible coupling known as Layrub as well as being a large manufacturer of garage and railway equipment.

== Birfield Industries ==
In 1939 Hardy-Spicer joined with Laycock Engineering both becoming subsidiaries of a new holding company named Birfield Industries Limited incorporated by Laycock Engineering's chairman, Herbert Hill (1901–1987) for that purpose.

=== Constant velocity joints ===
Herbert Hill pushed his team to make continuous improvements to the basic Rzeppa constant velocity joint and was rewarded in the 1960s when much of the world's motor industry switched to front wheel drive using Birfield joints, the CV joints now made by GKN Driveline and currently installed in more than one-third of all new cars worldwide.

Notable improvements to the original Rzeppa design have been the elimination of the need for a splined coupling and Birfield's modifications to the ball grooves and their track-steered ball cage introduced with BMC's Minis in 1959.

=== Rear axles ===
Salisbury Axle in USA was also part of the Spicer Group and in 1939 the Salisbury Transmission Company was formed in Britain to manufacture hypoid rear axles and, in the late 1950s, Powr-Lok limited-slip differentials.

=== Automotive clutches ===
Laycock's principal product became spring diaphragm clutches.

From the late 1940s into the 1970s it made under de Normanville patents an add-on epicyclic overdrive unit which saved manufacturers from incorporating a 4th or 5th gear within their gearboxes.

== Birfield multinational group 1964 ==
Group members included
Hardy Spicer; Laycock Engineering; Forgings & Presswork; Salisbury Transmission; Kent Alloys; Bound Brook; Felco Hoists; Hardy Spicer Walterscheid; John C Carlson; T B Ford; Shotton Bros; Felco Hoists; Birfield Filtration; R Jones & Co; Oddy Engineering; Birfield Machine Tools; Birfield Extrusions; Foundry Mechanisations (Baillot); A E Callaghan & Son; Micron Sprayers; Birfield Industries.

Overseas group members
Bound Brook Bearing Corporation of America, Nordiska Kardan AB; Birfield (Ireland); Birfield (Nederland) Tranmissie; Felco France.

Overseas interests
37.5 per cent of Uni-Cardan AG, 21 per cent of France's Glaenzer-Spicer SA in any case controlled by Uni-Cardan, Birfield Transmissioni SpA in Italy jointly owned with Glaenzer-Spicer, an association with Toyo Bearing of Japan and lesser interests in businesses in many other industrialised countries.

== GKN Driveline ==
In 1966 Guest Keen & Nettlefold seeing advantage in amalgamating with its local competition and wanting to pre-empt an expected bid from USA's TRW Inc. bought Birfield the sole UK supplier of CVJs.

There were also particular significant advantages in the amalgamation such as Hardy Spicer's strength in the EU and USA whereas GKN was weak in both those parts of the world.

As GKN Driveline its constant velocity joints take near 50 per cent of the world market and Driveline employs about 22,000 people at 46 locations across 23 countries.
