= Overdrive (mechanics) =

Gearing that lowers engine revolutions

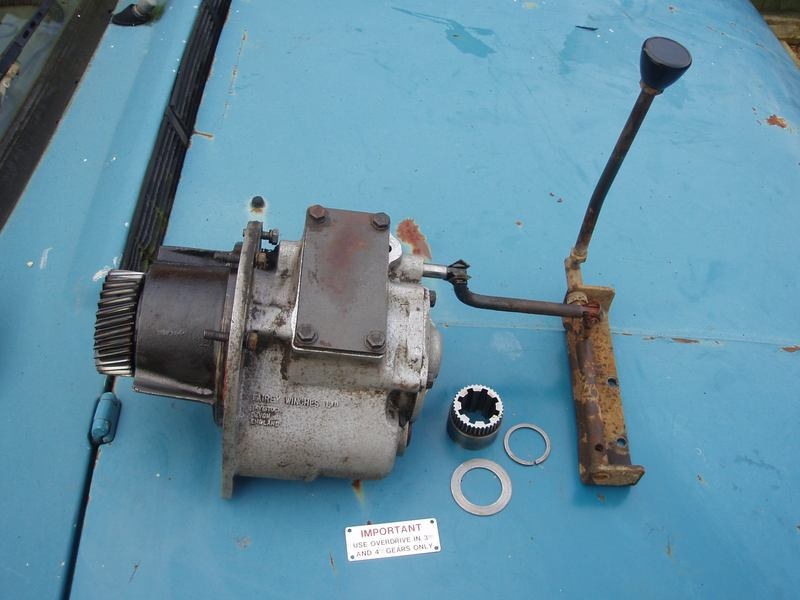
An overdrive is sometimes a separate unit that fits into the back of a gearbox, as with this Fairey unit. A plate warns to only engage the unit in third and fourth gears.

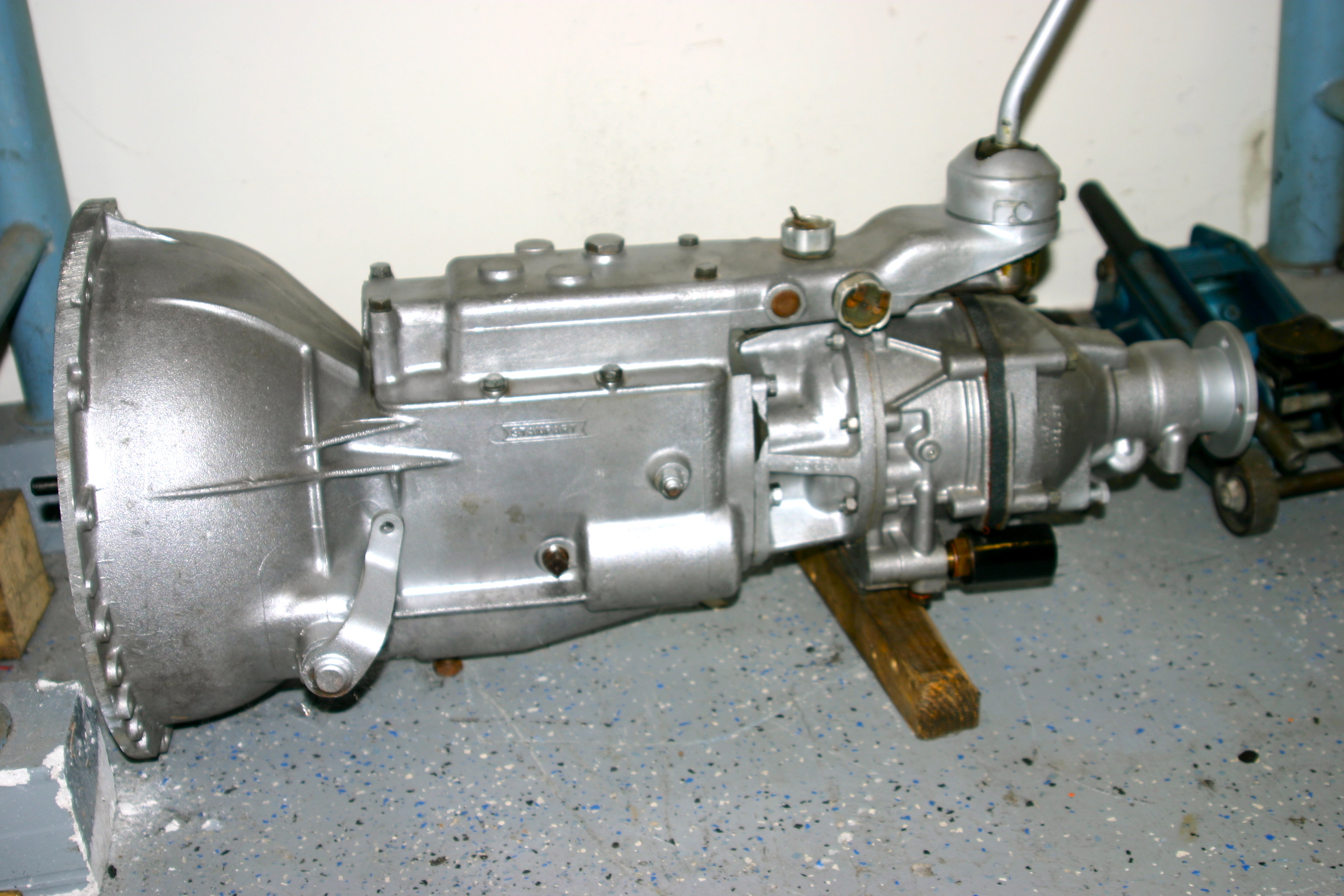
1960s Triumph gearbox with Laycock de Normanville electro-hydraulic operated overdrive

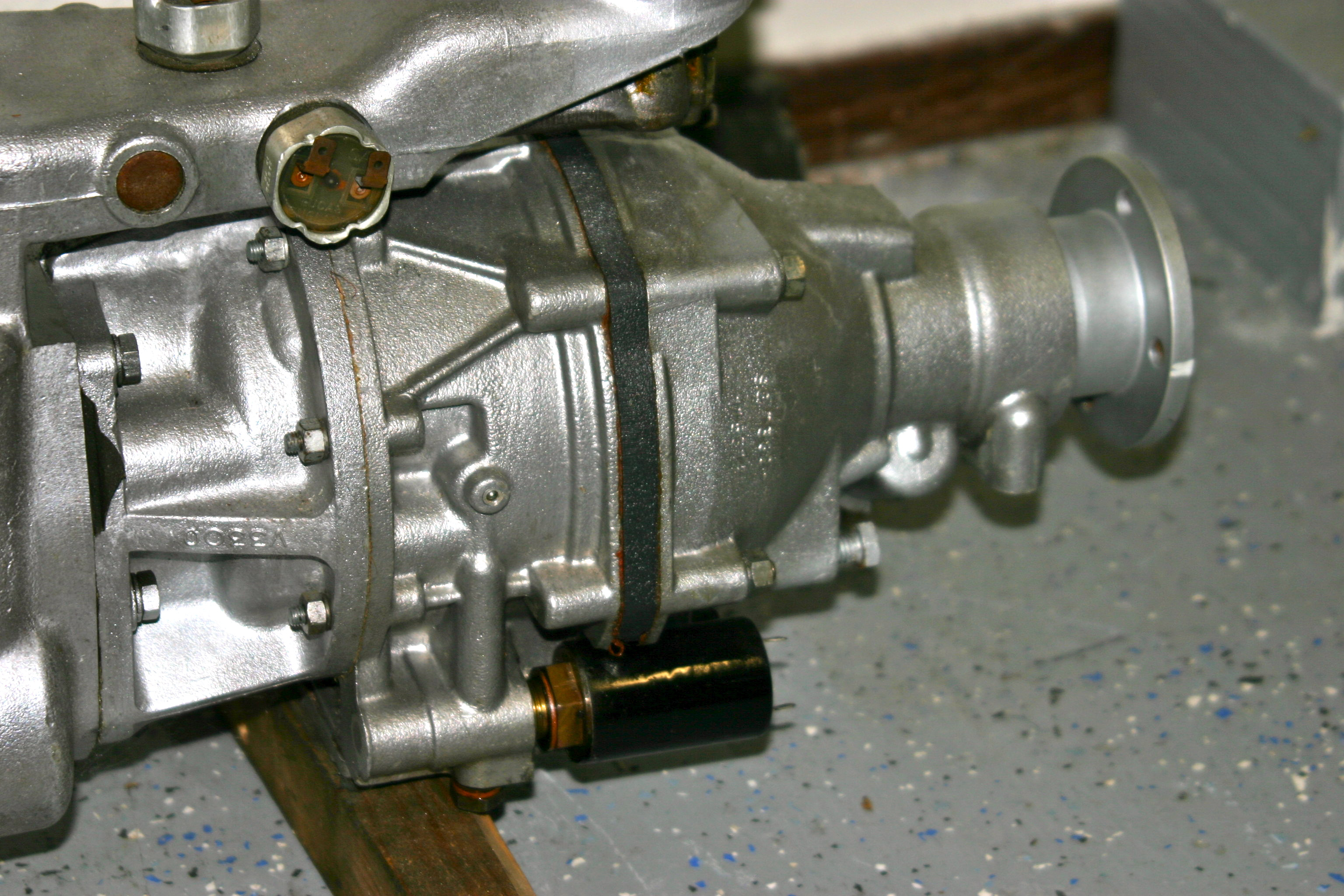
Laycock de Normanville "J type" overdrive unit

Overdrive is a mechanical unit containing epicyclic gears sized to allow an automobile to cruise at a sustained speed with reduced engine speed (rpm), leading to improved fuel consumption and reduced wear and noise level. The term is ambiguous. The gear ratio between engine and wheels causes the vehicle to be over-geared, and cannot reach its potential top speed, i.e., the car could travel faster if it were in a lower gear, with the engine turning at higher RPM.

The power produced by an engine increases with the engine's RPM to a maximum, then falls away. The point of maximum power is somewhat lower than the absolute maximum engine speed to which it is limited, the "redline". A car's speed is limited by the power required to drive it against air resistance, which increases with speed. At the maximum possible speed, the engine is running at its point of maximum power, or power peak, and the car is traveling at the speed where air resistance equals that maximum power. There is therefore one specific gear ratio at which the car can achieve its maximum speed: the one that matches that engine speed with that travel speed. At travel speeds below this maximum, there is a range of gear ratios that can match engine power to air resistance, and the most fuel efficient is the one that results in the lowest engine speed. Therefore, a car needs one gearing to reach maximum speed but another to reach maximum fuel efficiency at a lower speed.

With the early development of cars and the almost universal rear-wheel drive layout, the final drive (i.e., rear axle) ratio for fast cars was chosen to give the ratio for maximum speed. The gearbox was designed so that, for efficiency, the fastest ratio would be a "direct-drive" or "straight-through" 1:1 ratio, avoiding frictional losses in the gears. Achieving an overdriven ratio for cruising thus required a gearbox ratio even higher than this, i.e., the gearbox output shaft rotating faster than the engine. The propeller shaft linking gearbox and rear axle is thus overdriven, and a transmission capable of doing this became termed an "overdrive" transmission.

The device for achieving an overdrive transmission was usually a small separate gearbox, attached to the rear of the main gearbox and controlled by its own shift lever. These were often optional on some models of the same car.

As popular cars became faster relative to legal limits and fuel costs became more important, particularly after the 1973 oil crisis, the use of five-speed gearboxes became more common in mass-market cars. These had a direct (1:1) fourth gear with an overdrive fifth gear, replacing the need for the separate overdrive gearbox.

With the popularity of front wheel drive cars, the separate gearbox and final drive have merged into a single transaxle. There is no longer a propeller shaft and so one meaning of "overdrive" can no longer be applied. However the fundamental meaning, that of an overall ratio higher than the ratio for maximum speed, still applies: higher gears, with greater ratios than 1:1, are described as "overdrive gears".

== Description ==
=== Background ===
The power needed to propel a car at any given set of conditions and speed is straightforward to calculate, based primarily on the total weight and the vehicle's speed. These produce two primary forces slowing the car: rolling resistance and air drag. The former varies roughly with the speed of the vehicle, while the latter varies with the square of the speed. Calculating these from first principles is generally difficult due to a variety of real-world factors, so this is often measured directly in wind tunnels and similar systems.

The power produced by an engine increases with the engine's RPM to a maximum, then falls away. This is known as the point of maximum power. Given a curve describing the overall drag on the vehicle, it is simple to find the speed at which the total drag forces are the same as the maximum power of the engine. This defines the maximum speed the vehicle is able to reach. The rotational speed of the wheels for that given forward speed is simple to calculate, being the tire circumference multiplied by the RPM. (Note: For instance, a 15-inch wheel with 215/65 tyres has a diameter of about 26 inches, or a circumference of about 82 inches. At 100 mph, or 1760 inches per second, the wheel will be turning 21.5 times per second, or just under 1,300 RPM.) As the tire RPM at maximum speed is not the same as the engine RPM at that power, a transmission is used with a gear ratio to convert one to the other. (Note: Using the example above, at 100 mph the engine might need to be turning 5,000 RPM to generate the required power to turn the tyres at 1,300 RPM. A transmission with a gear ratio of 4:1 would be appropriate in this case.)

At even slightly lower speeds than maximum, the total drag on the vehicle is considerably less, and the engine needs to deliver this greatly reduced amount of power. In this case the RPM of the engine has changed significantly while the RPM of the wheels has changed very little. Clearly this condition calls for a different gear ratio. If one is not supplied, the engine is forced to run at a higher RPM than optimal. As the engine requires more power to overcome internal friction at higher RPM, this means more fuel is used simply to keep the engine running at this speed. Every cycle of the engine leads to wear, so keeping the engine at higher RPM is also unfavorable for engine life. Additionally, the sound of an engine is strongly related to the RPM, so running at lower RPM is generally quieter.

If one runs the same RPM transmission exercise outlined above for maximum speed, but instead sets the "maximum speed" to that of highway cruising, the output is a higher gear ratio that provides ideal fuel mileage. In an era when cars were not able to travel very fast, the maximum power point might be near enough to the desired speed that additional gears were not needed. But as more powerful cars appeared, especially during the 1960s, this disparity between the maximum power point and desired speed grew considerably. This meant that cars were often operating far from their most efficient point. As the desire for better fuel economy grew, especially after the 1973 oil crisis, the need for a "cruising gear" became more pressing.

=== Gearbox vs. final drive ===
The obvious solution to this problem would be to add more gears to the transmission. Indeed, in modern vehicles this is common. However, due to historical particularities, this was not always practical.

In the conventional rear-wheel drive layout, the transmission system normally contained two sections, the "gearbox" or "transmission" mounted behind the engine, and the "final drive" mounted in the rear axle at the rear of the car. The reason for this separation of duties between the front and back of the car was to allow the drive shaft to run at lower torque, by using higher RPM. As power is the product of RPM and torque, running the shaft at higher RPM allowed more power to be transferred at lower torque. Doing so reduced the torque the driveshaft had to carry, and thus the strength and weight required.

Although the designer was theoretically free to choose any ratio for the gearbox and final drive, there is one additional consideration which meant that the top gear of most gearboxes was 1:1 or "direct drive". This is chosen for efficiency, as it does not require any gears to transmit power and so reduces the power lost by them. This was particularly important in the early days of cars, as their straight-cut gears were poorly finished, noisy and inefficient. The final drive then took this output and adjusted it in a fixed-ratio transmission arrangement that was much simpler to build. Final drive ratios of 4:1 were common, (Note: This ratio varies between cars, from around 3.5:1 to 5:1. American cars with large-slow-revving engines would use higher ratios, European compact cars with small high-revving engines were lower. Often the final drive ratio varied between models within a range, a "sports" model having a lower ratio.) meaning that the wheels would turn at one fourth the rate they would if directly connected to the engine.

=== Overdrive ===
In an era when different models of car with different wheel sizes could be accommodated by simply changing the final drive ratio, it made sense for all transmissions to use direct drive as the highest gear. As noted earlier, however, this would cause the engine to operate at too high an RPM for efficient cruising. Although adding the cruising gear to the main gearbox was possible, it was generally simpler to add a separate two-gear overdrive system to the existing gearbox. This not only meant that it could be tuned for different vehicles, but had the additional advantage that it could be offered as an easily installed option.

With the use of front-wheel drive layouts, the gearbox and final drive are combined into a single transaxle. There is no longer a drive shaft between them and so the notion of "direct drive" is inapplicable. Although "overdrive" is still referred to, this is now mostly a marketing term to refer to any extra-high ratio for efficient cruising, whether it is achieved through the gearbox ratios, or by an unusually high final drive. (Note: Small Volkswagens of the 1980s, such as the Polo, were marketed to an environmentally-conscious market with an overdrive top ratio labelled on the gear shift as "E", variously described as "Efficiency", "Economy" or "Environment".)

== Usage ==
Generally speaking, overdrive is the highest gear in the transmission. Overdrive allows the engine to operate at a lower RPM for a given road speed. This allows the vehicle to achieve better fuel efficiency, and often quieter operation on the highway. When it is switched on, an automatic transmission can shift into overdrive mode after a certain speed is reached (usually 70+ km/h [40-45 mph or more] depending on the load). When it is off, the automatic transmission shifting is limited to the lower gears. Overdrive should usually be selected when the average speed is above 70 km/h (40-45 mph).

Dashboard indicator for overdrive (automatic vehicle, manufactured 2000)

The automatic transmission automatically shifts from OD to direct drive when more load is present. When less load is present, it shifts back to OD. Under certain conditions, for example driving uphill, or towing a trailer, the transmission may "hunt" between OD and the next highest gear, shifting back and forth. In this case, switching it off can help the transmission to "decide". It may also be advantageous to switch it off if engine braking is desired, for example when driving downhill. The vehicle's owner's manual will often contain information and suitable procedures regarding such situations, for each given vehicle.

Virtually all vehicles (cars and trucks) have overdrive today whether manual transmission or automatic. In the automotive aftermarket you can also retrofit overdrive to existing early transmissions. Overdrive was widely used in European automobiles with manual transmission in the 60s and 70s to improve mileage and sport driving as a bolt-on option but it became increasingly more common for later transmissions to have this gear built in. If a vehicle is equipped with a bolt-on overdrive (e.g.: GKN or Gear Vendors) as opposed to having an overdrive built in one will typically have the option to use the overdrive in more gears than just the top gear. In this case gear changing is still possible in all gears, even with overdrive disconnected. Overdrive simply adds effective ranges to the gears, thus overdrive third and fourth become in effect "third-and-a-half" and a fifth gear. In practice this gives the driver more ratios which are closer together providing greater flexibility particularly in performance cars.

== Operation ==
Overdrive button on the gear stick of an automatic vehicle manufactured in 2000.

An overdrive consists of an electrically or hydraulically operated epicyclic gear train bolted behind the transmission unit. It can either couple the input driveshaft directly to the output shaft (or propeller shaft) (1:1), or increase the output speed so that it turns faster than the input shaft (1:1 + n). Thus the output shaft may be "overdriven" relative to the input shaft. In newer transmissions, the overdrive speed(s) are typically as a result of combinations of planetary/epicyclic gearsets which are integrated in the transmission. For example, the ZF 8HP transmission has 8 forward gears, two of which are overdrive (< 1:1) gear ratios. In older vehicles, it is sometimes actuated by a knob or button, often incorporated into the gearshift knob, and does not require operation of the clutch. Newer vehicles have electronic overdrive in which the computer automatically adjusts to the conditions of power need and load.

== In Europe ==
The vast majority of overdrives in European cars were invented and developed by Edgar de Normanville, and manufactured by the English company Laycock Engineering (later GKN Laycock), at its Little London Road site in Sheffield. The system devised by de Normanville was adopted and manufactured by Laycock after his chance meeting with a Laycock Products Engineer. De Normanville overdrives were found in vehicles manufactured by Standard-Triumph, who were first, followed by Ford, BMC and British Leyland, Jaguar, Rootes Group and Volvo to name only a few. Another British company, the former aircraft builder Fairey, built a successful all-mechanical unit for the Land Rover, which is still in production in America today.

The first production vehicle to feature the Laycock system was the 1948 Standard Vanguard Saloon. The first unit to be created was the A-type overdrive, which was fitted to many sports cars during the 1950s, and into the late 1960s. Several famous marques used A-type overdrives, including Jaguar, Aston Martin, Ferrari, Austin-Healey, Jensen, Bristol, AC, Armstrong Siddeley and Triumph's TR sports car range, from the TR2 through to the end of the 1972 model year of the TR6.

In 1959, the Laycock Engineering Company introduced the D-type overdrive, which was fitted to a variety of motor cars including Volvo 120 and 1800s, Sunbeam Alpines and Rapiers, Triumph Spitfires, and also 1962–1967 MGBs (those with 3-synchro transmissions).

From 1967 the LH-type overdrive was introduced, and this featured in a variety of models, including 1968–1980 MGBs, the MGC, the Ford Zephyr, early Reliant Scimitars, TVRs, and Gilberns.

The J-type overdrive was introduced in the late 1960s, and was adapted to fit Volvo, Triumph, Vauxhall/Opel, American Motors and Chrysler motorcars, and Ford Transit vans.

The P-type overdrive marked the last updates and was manufactured in a Gear Vendors U.S. version and a Volvo version. The Volvo version kept the same package size as the J-type but with the updated 18 element freewheel and stronger splines through the planet carrier. The Gear Vendors U.S. version uses a larger 1.375 outer diameter output shaft for higher capacity and a longer rear case.

Over a period of 40 years, Laycock Engineering manufactured over three and a half million overdrive Units, and over one million of these were fitted to Volvo motorcars.

In 2008 the U.S. company Gear Vendors, Inc. of El Cajon, California purchased all the overdrive assets of GKN to continue production of the U.S. version and all spares for J and P types worldwide.

The system features an oil pressure operated device attached to the back of the standard gearbox operating on the gearbox output shaft. Through a system of oil pressure, solenoids and pistons, the overdrive would drop the revs on whatever gears it was used on by 22% (.778). For instance, the overdrive system applied to a Triumph TR5 operates on 2nd, 3rd and top gear. When engaged, the overdrive would drop the revs from 3000 by 666 RPM, or from 3500 the drop would be 777 RPM to 2723 net. The advantages this reduced rpm had on fuel consumption was most often quite near 22% decrease during highway driving.

== In North America ==
In the days before automatic transmissions were common, especially in the 1950s, many rear-wheel drive American cars were available with an overdrive option. With substantial improvements developed in Muncie, Indiana, by William B. Barnes for production by its Warner Gear Division, BorgWarner provided the box that was factory-installed between the transmission and a foreshortened driveshaft. Since the overdrive function, if enabled, could be shifted by simply easing up on the accelerator without depressing the clutch pedal, the action was much like a semi-automatic. Also, an electrically operated solenoid would deactivate the unit via a switch under the accelerator pedal providing the equivalent of the kickdown of the automatic. A knob connected to a bowden cable, similar to some emergency brake applications, was also provided to lock out the unit mechanically. Using overdrive with the main 3-speed transmission in 2nd gear was similar in ratio to 3rd gear, and with the main transmission in third, the overall ratio was fractional (i.e., "true overdrive"). This was important in reducing wear, tear, noise, and difficulty in control.

Such add-on overdrive boxes were available from the 1930s to the 1970s for cars and light trucks.

Today, most petrol and diesel cars and trucks come with an overdrive transmission to maximize fuel economy. Overdrive is included in both automatic and manual transmissions as an extra gear (or two in some cases).

== Fuel economy and drivetrain wear ==
When using overdrive gearing, the car's engine speed drops, reducing wear and normally saving fuel. Since 1981 U.S. corporate average fuel economy (CAFE) legislation, virtually all domestic vehicles have included overdrive to save fuel. One should refer to the car's owner's manual for the proper speed to run at overdrive. All engines have a range of peak efficiency and it is possible for the use of overdrive to keep the engine out of this range for all or part of the time of its use if used at inappropriate speeds, thus cutting into any fuel savings from the lower engine speed.

Overall drivetrain reduction comes down to three basic factors: transmission gearing (including overdrive), differential gearing (in the axle), and tire size. The rotation speed problem comes into effect when the differential gearing is a high ratio and an overdrive is used to compensate. This may create unpleasant vibrations at high speeds and possible destruction of the driveshaft due to the centripetal forces or uneven balance.

The driveshaft is usually a hollow metal tube that requires balancing to reduce vibration and contains no internal bracing.

The higher speeds on the driveshaft and related parts can cause heat and wear problems if an overdrive and high differential gearing (or even very small tires) are combined, and create unnecessary friction. This is especially important because the differential gears are bathed in heavy oil and seldom provided with any cooling besides air blowing over the housing.

The impetus is to minimize overdrive use and provide a higher ratio first gear, which means more gears between the first and the last to keep the engine at its most efficient speed. This is part of the reason that modern automobiles tend to have larger numbers of gears in their transmissions. It is also why more than one overdrive gear is seldom seen in a vehicle except in special circumstances i.e. where high (numerical) differential gear is required to get the vehicle moving as in trucks or performance cars though double overdrive transmissions are common in other vehicles, often with a small number on the axle gear reduction, but usually only engage at speeds exceeding 100 kilometres per hour (62 mph).
