= Gaiter (vehicle) =

Flexible sleeve on vehicle to protect moving parts

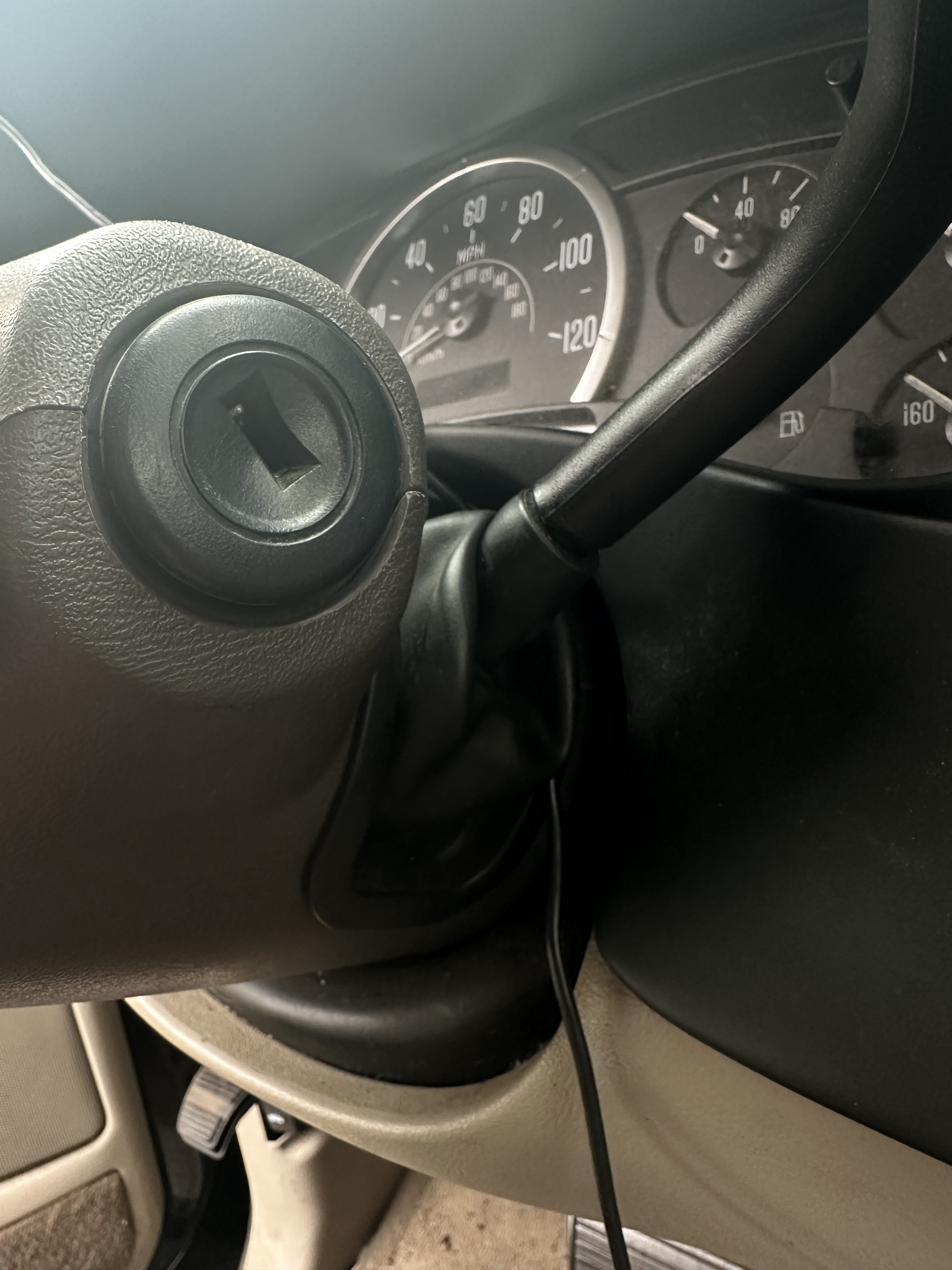
A gaiter on the automatic column shift of a 2004 Cadillac Escalade.

A gaiter, sometimes referred to as a boot, is a flexible protective covering made of rubber, vinyl, leather, thermoplastic, or fabric, designed to shield mechanical joints, sliding components, or linkages from dirt, moisture, and mechanical wear. Gaiters are usually found on constant-velocity (CV) joints, steering assemblies, suspension components, and interior gear levers. They are critical in maintaining lubrication and extending the life of the components they protect.

== Function ==
Automotive gaiters serve several purposes:

- Protection from contaminants: gaiters prevent dust, water, and road debris from entering sensitive joints and linkages, which can cause accelerated wear.
- Lubrication retention: in applications such as CV joints, gaiters keep grease sealed within the joint, ensuring smooth operation and preventing metal-on-metal contact.
- Component longevity: by maintaining a clean, lubricated environment, gaiters prolong the lifespan of joints, bearings, and seals.
- Aesthetic and functional interior use: gear lever and parking brake gaiters conceal mechanical linkages inside the cabin while preventing dust and debris from entering.

== Applications ==
=== CV joint boot ===
The CV joint boot is the most critical gaiter on many modern vehicles. It protects the joint located on the drive axle by keeping grease in and contaminants out. A damaged boot often leads to rapid joint failure because dirt mixes with the joint grease, forming an abrasive slurry.

=== Steering rack gaiter ===
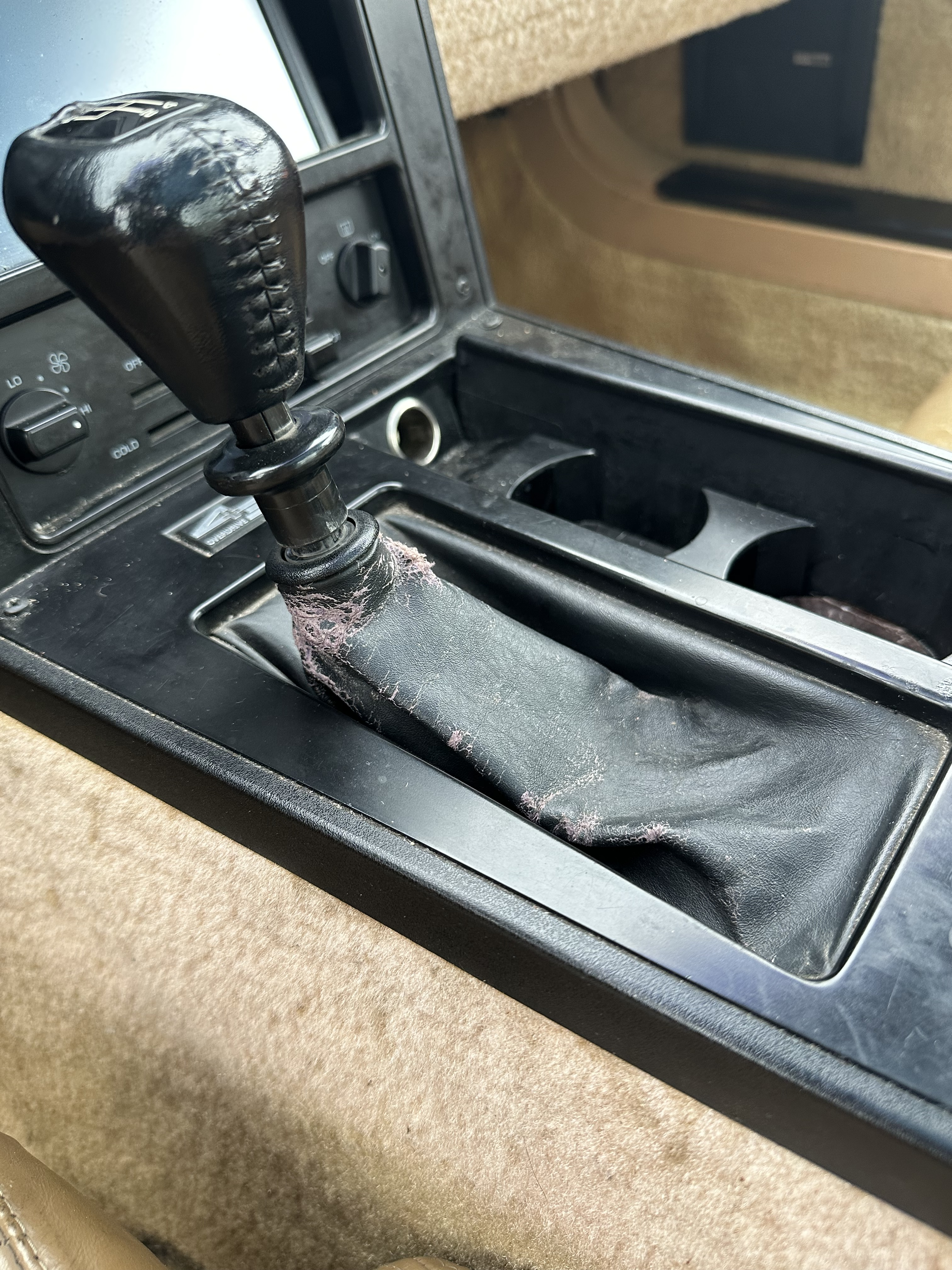
A worn shift boot from a 1985 Chevrolet Corvette

Steering rack gaiters (also called rack-and-pinion boots) protect the inner tie rods and steering gear from moisture, debris, and corrosion. Damage to these gaiters can lead to water entering the component and premature steering-rack wear.

=== Suspension gaiter ===
Shock absorbers and struts sometimes use gaiters (dust covers) to shield the piston rod from grit that could damage seals and cause fluid leaks.

=== Gear lever gaiter ===
Inside the cabin, a gear-lever gaiter covers the opening in the center console, enhancing interior appearance while preventing dirt from entering the shift assembly.

== Materials ==
Gaiters are manufactured from materials selected for durability and flexibility:

- Rubber (nitrile rubber or neoprene): common for CV boots due to oil resistance and elasticity.
- Thermoplastic elastomers: used in newer boot designs for heat resistance.
- Leather or synthetic leather: used mainly for interior shift gaiters.
- Vinyl or reinforced fabric: for cosmetic or light-duty applications.

Material studies show that rubber and thermoplastic elastomer compounds must withstand repeated flexing, centrifugal forces, and exposure to road contaminants.

== Maintenance and replacement ==
Gaiters should be inspected regularly due to their exposure to harsh conditions:

- Cracks or tears in rubber gaiters
- Grease leakage around CV joints
- Detachment from clamps
- Dirt buildup near joints

A torn CV boot should be replaced immediately to prevent CV joint failure, which is far more expensive than replacing the gaiter itself. Steering and suspension gaiters should also be replaced if damaged to avoid corrosion or mechanical wear inside hidden components.

== See also ==
- Gear Stick
- CV Axle
- List of auto parts
