= Driveline shunt =

Driveline shunt occurs when a vehicle gives an abrupt jolt while coming on or off overrun or freewheel. It is caused when the gearbox or other transmission linkages do not immediately relay changes in engine output to changes in wheel speed. There is a very brief delay before the backlash is taken up in a sudden, abrupt manner.

== Four scenarios ==
There are four scenarios where a shunt may occur:

1. The driver comes off the accelerator, the engine quickly goes into overrun but there is a short delay before the vehicle feels as though it has been shunted forwards slightly.
2. The driver gets on the accelerator after the engine has been on overrun, there is a short delay before the vehicle feels as though it has been shunted backwards slightly.
3. The driver changes the gearbox direction to drive/reverse or vice versa with the engine running (in an Automatic Transmission or Continuously variable transmission), there is a short delay before the vehicle feels as though it has been shunted backwards slightly.
4. The driver changes the gearbox direction to neutral (in an Automatic Transmission or Continuously variable transmission) but there is a short delay before the vehicle feels as though it has been shunted forwards slightly.

== Reasons for occurrence ==
It can occur due to slack within automatic gearboxes, but it can also occur from slack in the other driveline linkages especially where the drive-line is long due to the engine being the opposite end of the vehicle from the driven wheels. Due to the latter it can therefore occur in vehicles with a manual transmission. It has been known to occur even in very new and very high-end vehicles. With experience, most drivers simply allow for it and execute these torque transitions smoothly with finer control of the accelerator. Over time it is expected that engine management systems will increasingly do this on our behalf.

== Engine surge ==
Driveline shunt should not be confused with engine surge in automatic vehicle transmissions where an engine "searches" for its idle speed whilst at very low road speeds, and causes unexpected surges in acceleration. This is a different phenomenon which can be mitigated by an experienced driver using left foot braking for such very low speed manoeuvring.

== See also ==
- Automotive engineering
- Drivetrain
- Torque converter
- Transmission
