= Edgar de Normanville =

British inventor and journalist

Captain Edgar Joseph de Normanville R.E. (1882–1968) was a British engineer who became a successful inventor and a technical journalist.

== Biography ==
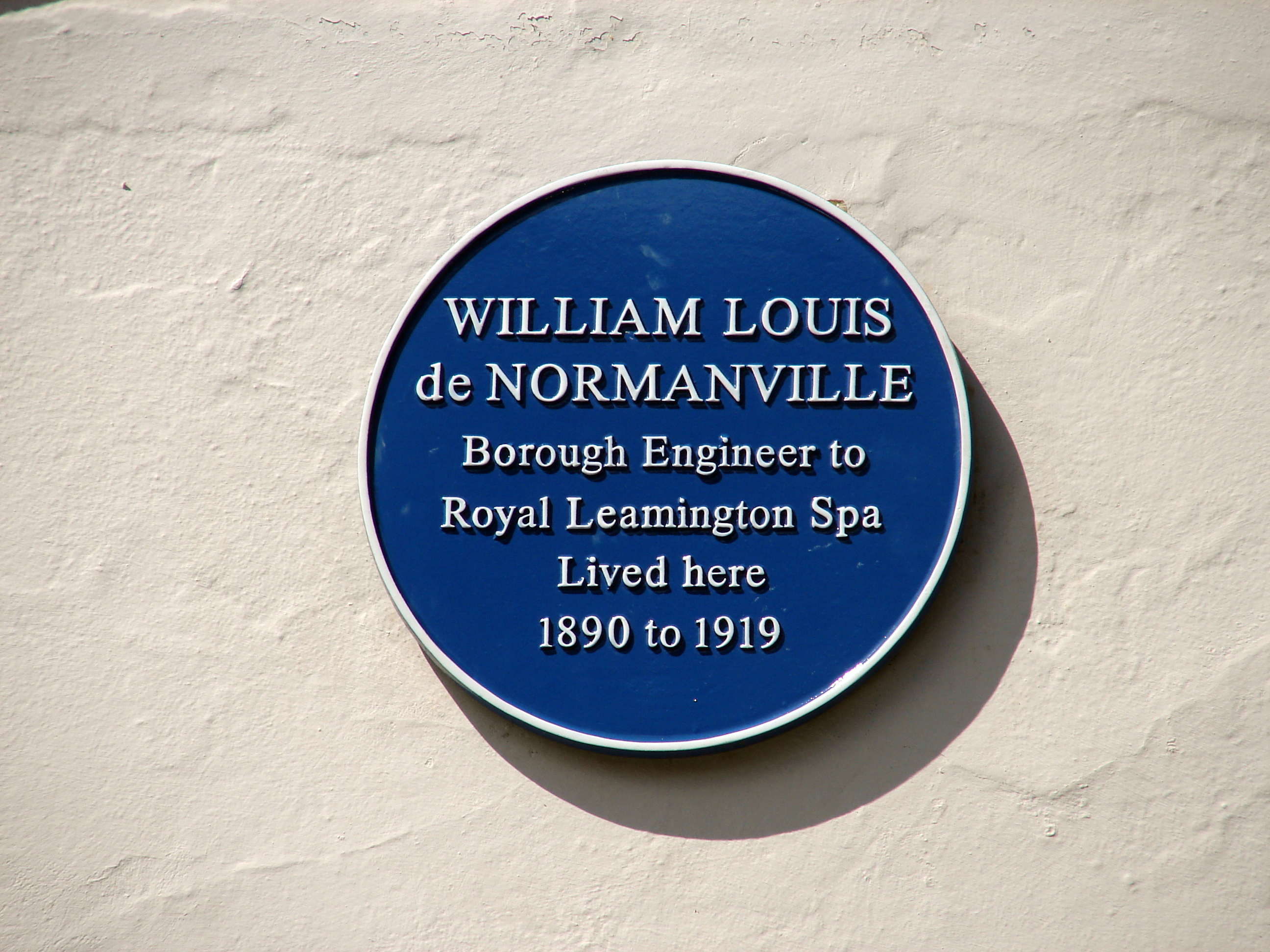

Born 13 October 1882 in Leamington Spa, the eldest son of William de Normanville (1843–1928), a civil engineer, and his wife born Elizabeth Simonds he was educated at Ampleforth College and completed an engineering apprenticeship.

=== Journalist ===
Fascinated by the development of motor vehicles he joined the editorial staff of the weekly motoring magazine The Motor in 1908. Following service with the Royal Engineers in the first world war he became motoring correspondent of The Daily Express and later The Chronicle.

=== Laycock-de Normanville ===
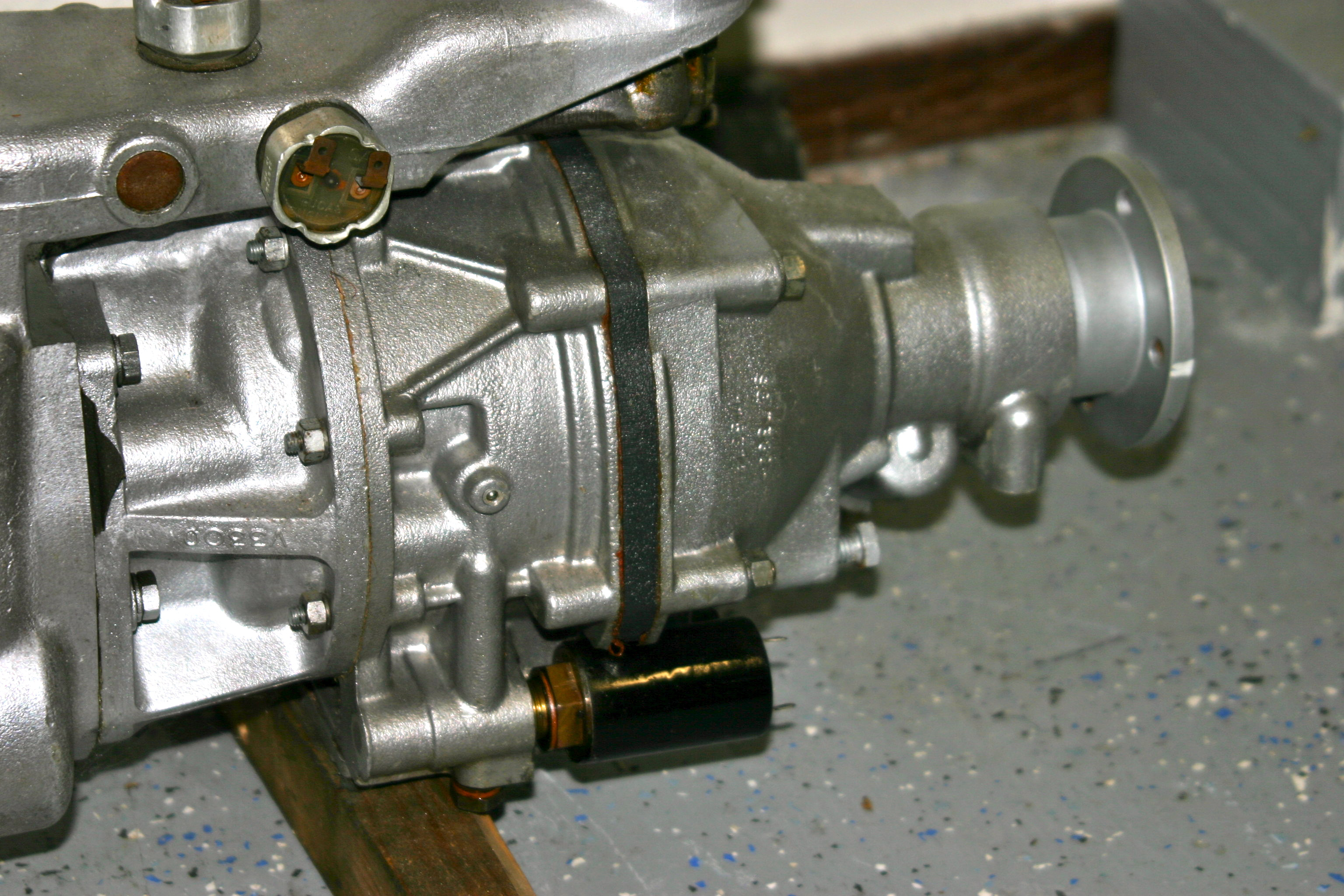
Laycock de Normanville overdrive unit

He designed an epicyclic four-speed gearbox produced by Humber during the 1930s but is best known for his epicyclic overdrive manufactured from the 1940s by Sheffield's Laycock Engineering. His design made it possible to shift instantly from overdrive to direct drive and back again without a break in the drive.

=== Death ===
He died on 17 January 1968, his widow in 1978.
