= NTN Corporation =

Japanese manufacturer of bearings

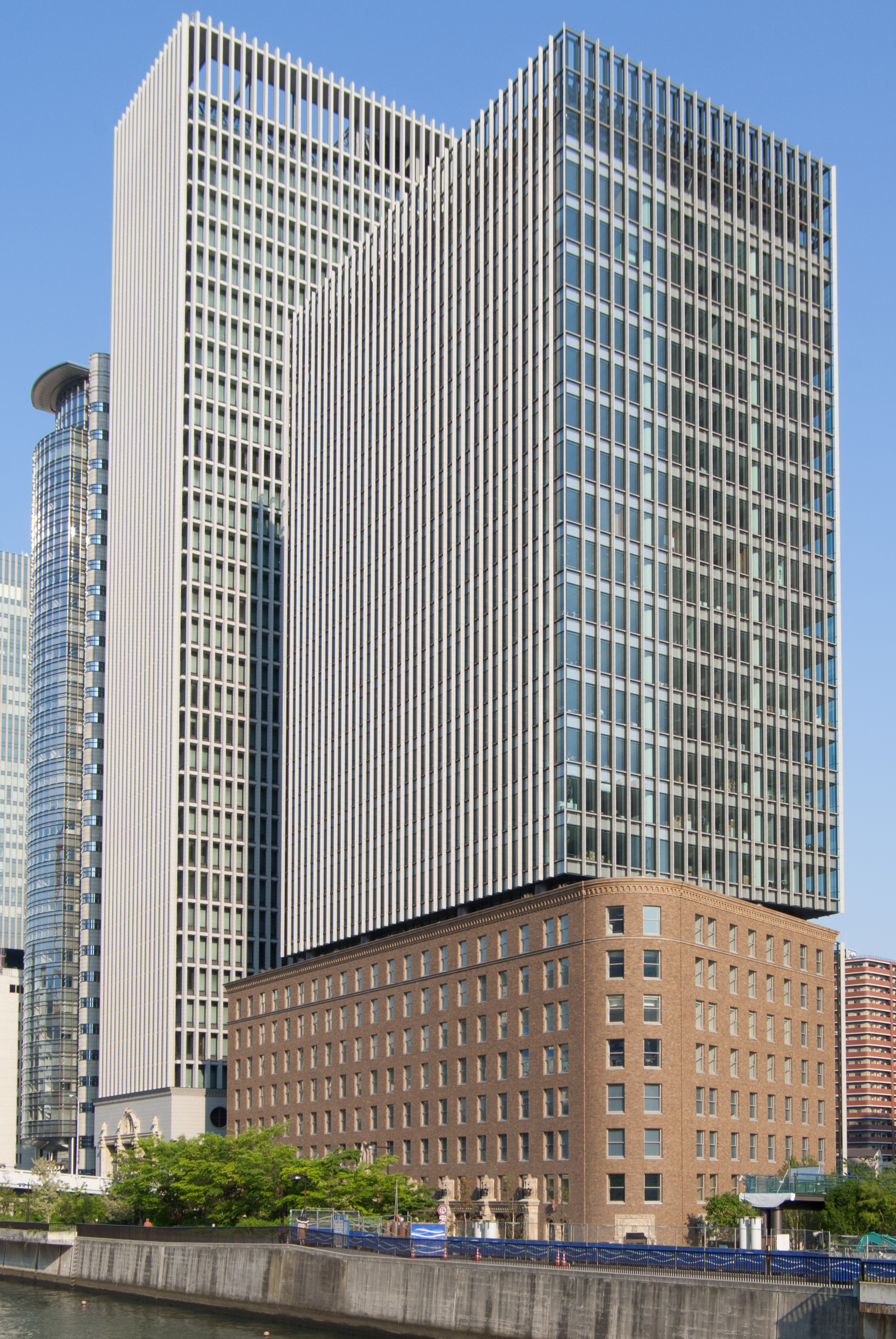
- Headquarters building in Osaka
- Native name: NTN株式会社
- Type: Public (K.K)
- Traded as: TYO: 6472; Nikkei 225 Component
- Industry: Manufacturing
- Predecessor: Nishizono Ironworks
- Founded: Kuwana, Mie Prefecture (March 1918; 108 years ago)
- Headquarters: 3-6-32, Nakanoshima, Kita-ku, Osaka 530-0005, Japan
- Key people: Eiichi Ukai (President)
- Products: Bearings; Constant-velocity joints; Precision equipment
- Services: Component maintenance, repair, and overhaul
- Revenue: ▲US$ 6.03 billion (FY 2016) (JPY 683.3 billion) (FY 2016)
- Net income: ▼US$ 142 million (FY 2013) (JPY -14.64 billion) (FY 2013)
- Number of employees: 24,665 (consolidated, as of March 31, 2017)
- Website: Official website

NTN Corporation (NTN株式会社, NTN Kabushiki-gaisha), also known historically as Niwa, Tomoe, and Nishizono, is a Japanese manufacturer of bearings and related components. The company produces bearings and friction-reducing products such as constant-velocity joints for automotive, industrial, and other applications.

NTN Corporation is listed on the Tokyo Stock Exchange and is a component of the Nikkei 225 stock index.

== History ==
=== Beginnings ===
It was competitor Nippon Seiko (now known as NSK) that began bearing production in Japan in 1914. In 1918, Nishizono Ironworks, a factory located in Uchibori, Mie Prefecture, began producing ball bearings.

=== Formation and split ===
Five years after Nishizono Ironworks began producing bearings, the company merged with Tomoe Trading to manufacture and market products under the name "NTN". In 1927, Nishizono and Tomoe separated, with Nishizono establishing a new entity named NTN Manufacturing Company.

=== Toyo Bearing Manufacturing ===
In 1934, the company reorganized as a joint-stock company, changing its name to Toyo Bearing Manufacturing. When Japan invaded Manchuria, the demand for bearings increased due to the war, and manufacturing productivity followed suit. In 1938, Toyo created a domestic subsidiary named Showa Bearing Manufacturing Company, in Mukogun, Hyogo Prefecture. Toyo absorbed Showa into its organization the following year, making the facility into its Mukogawa plant and merging Mukogawa's operations with those of their newly established plant in Kuwana.

By 1945, raw materials shortages that resulted from World War II rendered Japanese bearing manufacturers unable to produce at full capacity. However, in the late 1940s, as Japan recovered from combat, demand from the war-torn country and its intracontinental neighbors increased.

=== Sales ===
In the late 1940s, Toyo established a marketing division named NTN Sales. The company became one of several major bearing manufacturers operating in Japan during this period. In 1954, NTN Sales received the Deming Prize for statistical quality control. In subsequent years, the company expanded its product range, including the manufacture of expansion-compensating bearings.

During the 1960s, the company reorganized its operations through the creation of subsidiaries focused on specific product lines. Joint ventures and overseas subsidiaries were established in Europe, North America, and Asia to support manufacturing and distribution activities.

In 1971, Toyo started Toyo Bearing Okayama Company to produce automotive tapered bearings and roller bearings in addition to founding American NTN Bearing Manufacturing Corporation. It was during that same year that Toyo finished construction on a manufacturing facility in Schiller Park, their first manufacturing facility in North America. Additionally, a sales division, NTN Trading-Hong Kong and a manufacturing segment, NTN Kugellagerfabrik were created.

=== NTN Toyo Bearing Company ===
The following year, the company's name was changed from Toyo Bearing Manufacturing to NTN Toyo Bearing Company. Like other Japanese bearing manufacturers, NTN became so successful that it created angst among their overseas competitors, especially those in the United Kingdom. England in fact, urged Japanese companies to restrict exports from 1972 to 1974. Other countries in Europe, however, were quite adamant about procuring such superior quality bearings, and continued to do so. For this reason, the company's growth was uninterrupted during the mid-1970s. In fact, from 1973 to 1975, NTN Manufacturing Canada, NTN de Mexico and NTN Suramericana were opened, in addition to another factory in Elgin, Illinois.

In 1977 however, NTN Toyo posted a loss of 1 billion JPY due to the increasing value of the Japanese Yen making exports more expensive. Because most of their bearings were still made inside the borders of Japan, the prices of the bearings were still subject to changes in international exchange rates. Additionally, many Japanese bearing manufacturers were penalized by the European Economic Community for predatory pricing. As a result, in 1978, for the first time in over a decade, NTN Toyo withheld dividend payments.

The value of the yen soon decreased however, and the company's exports returned to normal. Strong customer demand also resulting from the weakening yen resulted in increased sales. By 1979, all overseas NTN Toyo manufacturing facilities were once again operating at or above full production capacity.

After NTN Toyo recovered from its downturn, the company looked to expand its constant-velocity joint business in the United States. By expanding on all of their product lines in this part of the world, NTN Toyo was able to reduce the number of goods exported from Japan. In 1982, the company built an addition onto its Okayama plant for the purpose of building automotive joints. In addition, a joint venture with Hyundai Motors had this business partner manufacturing joints via a license from NTN Toyo. The following year, NTN Toyo also licensed Lepco Company and Taiway to produce additional constant-velocity joints.

From 1984 to 1985, NTN Toyo concentrated on tapered roller bearings at its United States facilities such as their Elgin factory. This building was added onto in 1984 in order to produce such bearings at a higher rate of production. In 1985, NTN Toyo Nagano Works, a designer and manufacturer of precision miniature bearings, also opened for business. That same year, NTN Toyo partnered with Federal-Mogul Corporation to produce tapered bearings and cylindrical roller bearings. The new joint venture, NTN-Bower Corporation, inherited two Federal-Mogul facilities and an additional research facility. NTN Toyo initially owned 60% of this joint venture, but purchased the remaining 40% of NTN-Bower Corporation two years later to fully acquire the company.

In 1986, the company constructed its Kuwana plant, NTN Toyo's first factory dedicated to bearings used in aerospace products. Soon after this facility was established, Timken Company claimed that NTN Toyo and other Japanese bearing makers were selling their products below market prices. As a result, the United States Department of Commerce found those companies guilty of predatory pricing. NTN Toyo was ordered to pay a financial penalty equal to 47% of the prices of the products that the company exported to that country.

In 1988, NTN Toyo established its first technical center in Michigan, added a bearing-hub factory in Elgin, and partnered with GKN Transmission and Borg-Warner to produce constant-velocity joints in Australia under the name Unidrive. Borg-Warner owned 50% of the company, GKN owned 30% and NTN Toyo owned 20%.

=== NTN USA Corporation/Name change of conglomerate to NTN Corporation ===
In the following year, NTN Toyo changed its name to NTN Corporation while creating a new constant-velocity joint factory and research and development center for NTN Driveshaft in Columbus, Indiana.

As a result of globalization, with bearings being further governed by international guidelines, NTN consolidated its foreign operations while trying to expand further into cutting edge markets. In order to expand North American operations, the company formed NTN USA Corporation, which was slated to become a holding company for their existing US divisions. They also established an office to oversee the fabrication activities of their existing operations. One of NTN's objectives was to begin production of constant-velocity joints in North America. One of their first steps in doing so was the 1996 purchase of Federal-Mogul's ball bearings sector.

=== Twenty-first century developments ===
In addition to North America, NTN established in 2000 a constant-velocity joint and bearing manufacturing facility in Thailand called NTN Manufacturing Company Limited. To manage the explosion of the company's portfolio, colloquially known as the "Four Base Production and Sales System", NTN reorganized its operations. As a result, NTN Sales Corporation was made a part of the conglomerate.

The following year, the company partnered with FAG Kugelfischer Georg Schafer AG to sell bearings in both North America and Europe. This partnership helped create factories in both Portugal and Hungary. NTN also started its "Management System Transformation Project" with the goal of making its regional and international operations more efficient. A Program Office was created to manage a number of subprojects. These subprojects were created to improve client relations and improve productivity.

The company then in 2002, took part in three separate joint ventures. First, they set up Shanghai NTN Corporation for the purpose of producing constant-velocity joint cassettes. Second, working with Nidec Corporation, created NTN-NIDEC Corporation in Zhejiang, China. Then, in their final joint venture that year, the company, in conjunction with Taiwan Yulon Group Corporation, created Guangzhou NTN-Yulon Drivetrain to fabricate additional constant velocity joints. The year after this, three new companies were formed, two in the United States and one in China. The two American companies, named NTK Precision Axle Corporation and Asahi Forge of America Corporation provided heat treatment and forging services, respectively. The company in China was called Beijing NTN-Seohan Driveshaft, and served as an additional manufacturing facility for their constant-velocity joint platform.

In 2004, NTN Mie Corporation and Shangzhou NTN-Guangyang Corporation were formed for bearing fabrication while Nagano Works, Kuwana Works, Iwata Works, and Okayama Works earned ISO/TS16949 and ISO9001 certifications. Next year, NTN Kamiina Corporation and NTN's General Research & Development Center (Iwata) were formed domestically while NTN Investment Corporation (China), NTN-NIDEC (Thailand) and NTN Manufacturing India were formed abroad. The year after, in 2006, NTN Corporation made two grand investments. These investments included infusions into IFA-Antriebstechnik GmbH, a producer of constant velocity joints in IFA Group as well as SNR Roulements, a sub-tier of Renault (which became part of NTN Corporation in 2008). During that same year, NTN Fukuroi Corporation became the company's third local factory for constant velocity joints.

From 2007 to 2009, NTN Corporation entered the large component market by establishing NTN Hakui Corporation in Ishikawa. This facility specialized in turning large bearings, while Nanjing Puzhen NTN Railway Bearing Company was formed for the fabrication of railway bearings. Soon after, in conjunction with Korea Flange Co., Ltd. KOFCO Group added Seohan-NTN Driveshaft USA Corporation to its United States conglomerate. In addition to these ventures, NTN HoudatsuShimizu Corporation was set up to manufacture super-large machinery parts and bearings, NTN Transmissions Europe Crézancy was established by the acquisition of Setfoge's Crézancy facility by NTN Transmissions Europe and NTN Shika Corporation was put in place to forge large bearings. Additionally, at the end of this period, NTN's Elemental Technology R&D Center was formed in Kuwana.

In 2010 NTN entered the wind energy market via the establishment of Seohan-NTN Bearing Company. This was a joint-venture with Seohan in South Korea. Additionally, NTN Driveshaft do Brasil and NTN Noto Corporation were formed for constant velocity joints and industrial machinery bearings. Most recently, however, NTN partnered with Luoyang LYC to distribute bearings in China, with mass production in the country expected to begin in 2012.

== Consolidated subsidiaries ==
=== NTN USA Corporation ===
NTN USA Corporation, based in Mount Prospect, Illinois, was founded in 1990. It is the United States holding company for several subsidiaries that supply ball, roller & mounted bearings, bearing units, constant velocity joints for the aircraft, automotive, fabrication & forklift fields in addition to power transmission equipment.

==== American NTN Bearing Manufacturing Corporation ====
Founded in 1971, American NTN Bearing Manufacturing Corporation produces steel balls and anti-friction bearings at their facility in Elgin, Illinois.

==== NTN-BCA Corporation ====
Founded in 1898 in Lancaster, Pennsylvania, as the Star Ball Retainer Company, Star Ball Retainer Company merged with the Bretz Company in 1910 to form the Bearing Corporation of America. NTN Corporation then acquired Bearing Corporation of America in 1996, establishing NTN-BCA Corporation in Lititz, Pennsylvania the following year. The company produced ball, mounted and needle roller bearings used in clutch releases, engines and heavy industrial equipment in addition to constant velocity joints for aerospace, automobile, forklift and manufacturing customers. The company made an announcement that they had plans to close the plant in 2009.

==== NTN Bearing Corporation Of America ====
With roots tracing back to 1963, NTN Bearing Corporation of America of Mount Prospect, Illinois, produces and distributes roller and ball bearings to the United States industrial, automotive and recreational clientele. Products manufactured by the company include agricultural and farm implement bearings, angular contact ball bearings, automotive bearings, ball and roller bearing mounted units, cylindrical roller bearings, electrical motor bearings, heavy industrial bearings, machine tool bearings, micro and miniature ball bearings, needle roller bearings, radial ball bearings, spherical roller bearings, tapered roller bearings and ultra-class bearing units.

In addition to the bearing products produced by the company, the facility manufactures constant velocity joints and precision equipment.

=== Guangzhou NTN-Yulon Drivetrain ===
Guangzhou NTN-Yulon Drivetrain was formed in 2002 to manufacture constant velocity joints. The company is a partnership with Yulon Group, a company that manufactures automobiles through Aeolus Motor Corporation and South East Motor Corporation.

=== NTA Precision Axle Corporation ===
NTA Precision Axle Corporation of Carol Stream, Illinois, was established in December 2010 is a joint venture between Asahi Forge Corporation, NTN Corporation and Takano Kogyo. The company has plans to integrate forging, heat-treatment and turning in order to pre-process automobile hub bearings starting in June 2011.

=== NTE Gardelegen ===
NTE Gardelegen is a bearing manufacturer based in Gardelegen, Germany.

=== NTK Precision Axle Corporation ===
In 2004, NTK Precision Axle Corporation began business with its sole facility in Frankfort, IN. The subsidiary manufactures wheel hub assemblies for four wheel drive and front wheel drive vehicles as well as axles for constant velocity joints.

=== NTN Bearing Corporation of Canada ===
With roots tracing back to 1968, NTN Bearing Corporation of Canada in Mississauga, Ontario, produces and sells a broad variety of bearings for applications such as automobile, industrial, recreational, skating and snowmobile markets. The company owns four strategically placed warehouses and hundreds of distribution outlets for the purpose of offering expedient nationwide service.

=== NTN Bearing - Malaysia ===
NTN Bearing - Malaysia in Selangor, Malaysia, is a producer of ball and roller bearings, drive shafts and other proprietary high-tech automation products. The company has additional branches in Butterworth, Ipoh, Johor Bahru and Kuantan, Malaysia.

=== NTN Bearing Service Co. ===
Established in 2003, NTN Bearing Service Co. was formed by Higashinihon NTN Service Corporation, who was a wholly owned subsidiary of NTN Corporation at the time. Kyushu NTN Corporation was absorbed into the wholly owned subsidiary, which also took control of Osaka NTN Pillow Center Corporation in Kansai. The consolidation was part of structural reform plan "NEW Plan 21", which is based on the philosophy that growth in distributor size will improve the organization's capability to deliver product. The company sells and distributes ball bearings, bearing units, needle roller bearings, parts feeders and plummer blocks. The company has facilities in Hokkaido, Kyushu, Osaka and Tohoku.

=== NTN Bearing-Singapore ===
Founded in 1971, NTN Bearing-Singapore is a regional distribution center of bearings, constant velocity joints and precision equipment for the Southeast Asia region.

=== NTN Bearings (UK) ===
Established in 1964, NTN Bearings (UK) of Lichfield, Staffordshire, is a producer of ball bearings and roller bearings.

=== NTN-Bower Corporation ===
Founded in 1965, NTN-Bower Corporation in Macomb, Illinois, is one of North America's most prominent producers of tapered roller bearings, fan housings, mass weights, precision roller bearings and other related components.

=== NTN Casting Corporation ===
NTN Casting Corporation is a wholly owned subsidiary of NTN Corporation based in Hirata, Shimane Prefecture. The company is a member of the Japan Cast Iron Foundry Association, and performed research on the recycling of casting sand for use as roadbed material, which has historically taken up space in landfills.

=== NTN (China) Investment Corporation ===
NTN (China) Investment Corporation was established in Shanghai in 2005 to oversee its current operations and new projects in China to improve productivity relative to capital, equipment, information, materials, personnel, products, technology and other business resources as well as integrating supply chain channels and advancing new projects.

=== NTN Driveshaft ===
NTN Driveshaft in Columbus, Indiana, produces constant velocity joints used in four-wheel, front-wheel and all-wheel drive cars.

=== NTN Engineering Plastics Corporation ===
NTN Engineering Plastics Corporation in Inabe District, Mie, produces thrust washers, smooth and flanged one, two and three-layer sleeve bearings and high-performance sliding bearings. Additionally, the company provides sheet, rod and pipe stock to its customers to allow them to produce their own components. Using the latest in engineering plastics technology, the company produces its products using base materials such as aromatic polyester, elastomer (“Sliding Rubber”), fluoro oil, fluoro plastics, polyamide, polyamideimide, polyetheretherketone, polyethylene, polyimide, polyoxymethylene (polyacetal), polyphenylensulfide and tetrafluoroethylene.

=== NTN Franc3 ===
NTN Franc3 was established as a joint venture with INA-SIDAG in 1964 as NTN SIDAG S.A. The company became an NTN subsidiary almost one decade later.

=== NTN Fukuroi Corporation ===
In 2006, due to the increasing worldwide need for lighter, quieter, smoother riding constant velocity joints and their subcomponents, NTN Corporation created a subsidiary in Fukuroi, Shizuoka, called NTN Fukuroi Corporation. This was their third constant velocity joint manufacturing facility in Japan, and their fourteenth globally.

=== NTN Houdatsushimizu Corporation ===
NTN Houdatsushimizu Corporation in Hakui District, Ishikawa, was established in 2009 to expand the company's capabilities in producing extra large bearings used in large industrial machinery such as wind turbines.

=== NTN Kamiina Corporation ===
NTN Kamiina Corporation in Kamiina District, Nagano, was established next to NTN Nagano Works in late 2005 to produce high precision rollers to meet demand for NTN products that utilize rollers. The factory began production of these components in early 2006.

=== NTN Kinan Corporation ===
With operations dating back to 1975, NTN Kinan Corporation in Wakayama, Japan, produces automotive axle bearings for automakers in Japan. In 2008, the company expanded its production capacity by over 15% in order to supplement the automotive industry.

=== NTN Kongo Corporation ===
Established in 1961 as Kongo Bearing Company, NTN Kongo Corporation manufactures and develops not only radial ball bearings, pillow block bearings, bearing units and clutch release bearings, but also develops and produces bearing production equipment used by NTN Corporation.

=== NTN Kugellagerfabrik ===
NTN Kugellagerfabrik (Deutschland) GmbH in Mettmann, Germany, manufactures gears, ball and roller bearings, mechanical power transmission equipment such as cranks, transmission shafts, camshafts, bearing housings and plain shaft bearings.

=== NTN Mie Corporation ===
Formerly known as Keiji NTN Corporation, NTN Mie Corporation in Kuwana-gun, Mie Prefecture was created in 1994 near NTN Kuwana Works and the Kuwana Engineering Center as a model for the domestic production of bearings.

=== NTN Mikumo ===
NTN Mikumo was formed in 1988 to produce needle roller bearings and constant velocity joint subassemblies and components.

=== NTN Noto Corporation ===
NTN Noto Corporation was established in Hakui, Ishikawa, to produce and distribute bearings for construction, industrial wind power, mining and steel clientele. The company plans to begin operations in April 2012.

=== NTN Omaezaki Corporation ===
With roots dating back to 1966, NTN Omaezaki Corporation produces needle roller bearings at its facility in Omaezaki, Shizuoka Prefecture.

=== NTN Powder Metal Corporation ===
NTN Powder Metal Corporation originated in 1966 as Toyo Bearing Powder Metal Company. The company was responsible for developing NTN BEARPHITE (TM) bearings in conjunction with its parent company. NTN BEARPHITE (TM) bearings are fluid hydrodynamic bearings made from sintered material whose sliding bore surface has hydrodynamic grooves shaped like herringbones, which permit higher rotational accuracy at faster speeds. Such bearings are used in audiovisual equipment, automotive electrical equipment, household appliances and office equipment.

=== NTN-SNR Roulements ===
Founded in 1916 as SNR Group in Annecy, France, NTN-SNR Roulements develops, produces and markets bearings for airplanes, agriculture, agrifood industry, automotive, construction, electric motor/pump, helicopter, industrial, machine tool, mining, paper, railway, space vehicle, steel, textile, transmission and wind turbine clientele. Bearing products that the company produces include accessory, alternator, cast iron self-aligning ball bearing units, cast-iron pillow blocks, clutch-release, engine, gearbox, lubrication products, self-aligning bearing units, spherical roller and topline bearings, starter, suspension and wheel bearings in addition to specialty bearings. Other products that the company manufactures include heavy goods vehicle products, high precision ball, roller or needle, and combined bearings, linear motion, maintenance, and mechatronic products, range extensions, self-aligning bearing units, timing products and transmission seals.
