= Alfred H. Rzeppa =

German-American mechanical engineer (1885–1965)

Animated representation of Rzeppa's invention

Alfred Hans Rzeppa (January 23, 1885, Gleiwitz – January 1965) was an American engineer of Silesian and Polish descent working at Ford Motor Company who invented a version of constant-velocity joint in 1926. He proposed an improved design in 1936.

Rzeppa's design uses six balls and an inner and outer race to provide almost constant velocity torque transfer regardless of the joint angle. The joint works in a similar manner to a bevel gear with the balls bisecting the joint angle and functioning as the "teeth" to transmit torque.

The description of the three versions of the Rzeppa joint can be found in the US patents 1,665,280 and 2,010,899 and 2,046,584.
