= Drivetrain =

Group of components that deliver power to the driving wheels

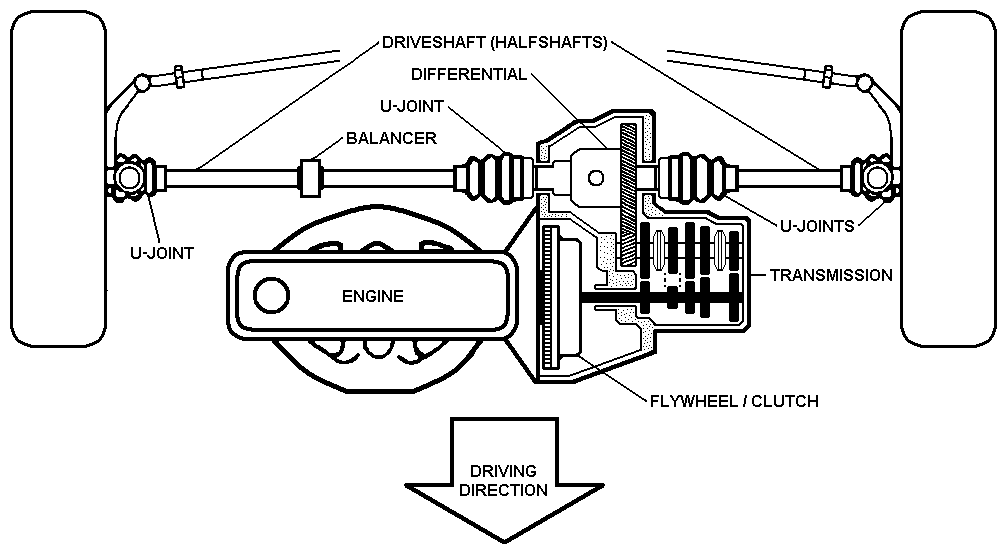
Engine and drivetrain of a transverse-engine front-wheel drive car

A drivetrain (drive-train or drive train), also known as a transmission system, is the group of components that deliver mechanical power from the prime mover to the driven components. In automotive engineering, the drivetrain is the components of a motor vehicle that deliver power to the drive wheels. This excludes the engine or motor that generates the power. In marine applications, the drive shaft will drive a propeller, thruster, or waterjet rather than a drive axle, while the actual engine might be similar to an automotive engine. Other machinery, equipment and vehicles may also use a drivetrain to deliver power from the engine(s) to the driven components.

In contrast, the powertrain is considered to include both the engine and/or motor(s) as well as the drivetrain.

== Function ==
The function of the drivetrain is to couple the engine that produces the power to the driving wheels that use this mechanical power to rotate the axle. This connection involves physically linking the two components, which may be at opposite ends of the vehicle and so requiring a long propeller shaft or drive shaft. The operating speed of the engine and wheels are also different and must be matched by the correct gear ratio. As the vehicle speed changes, the ideal engine speed must remain approximately constant for efficient operation and so this gearbox ratio must also be changed, either manually, automatically or by an automatic continuous variation.

== Automotive components ==
The precise components of the drivetrain vary, according to the type of vehicle.

Some typical examples:

=== Manual transmission car ===
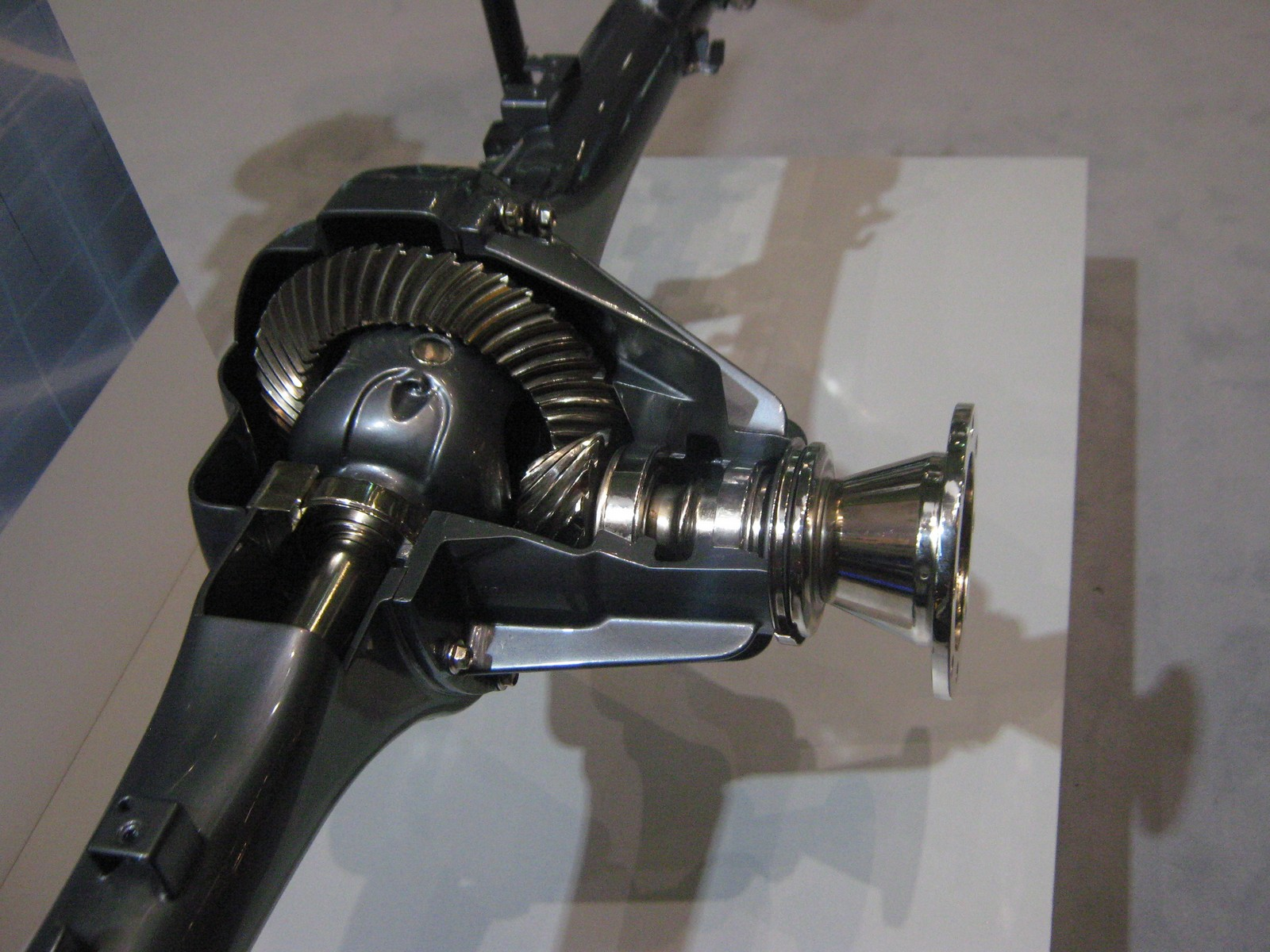
Rear axle with hypoid bevel gear final drive

- Flywheel
  - Dual mass flywheel still rare
- Clutch
- Gearbox
  - Overdrive Since the adoption of 5 speeds has become standard
- Propeller shaft
- Rear axle
  - Final drive
  - Differential

=== Automatic transmission car ===
- Torque converter
- Transmission
- Propeller shaft
- Rear axle
  - Spool
  - Differential

=== Front-wheel drive car ===
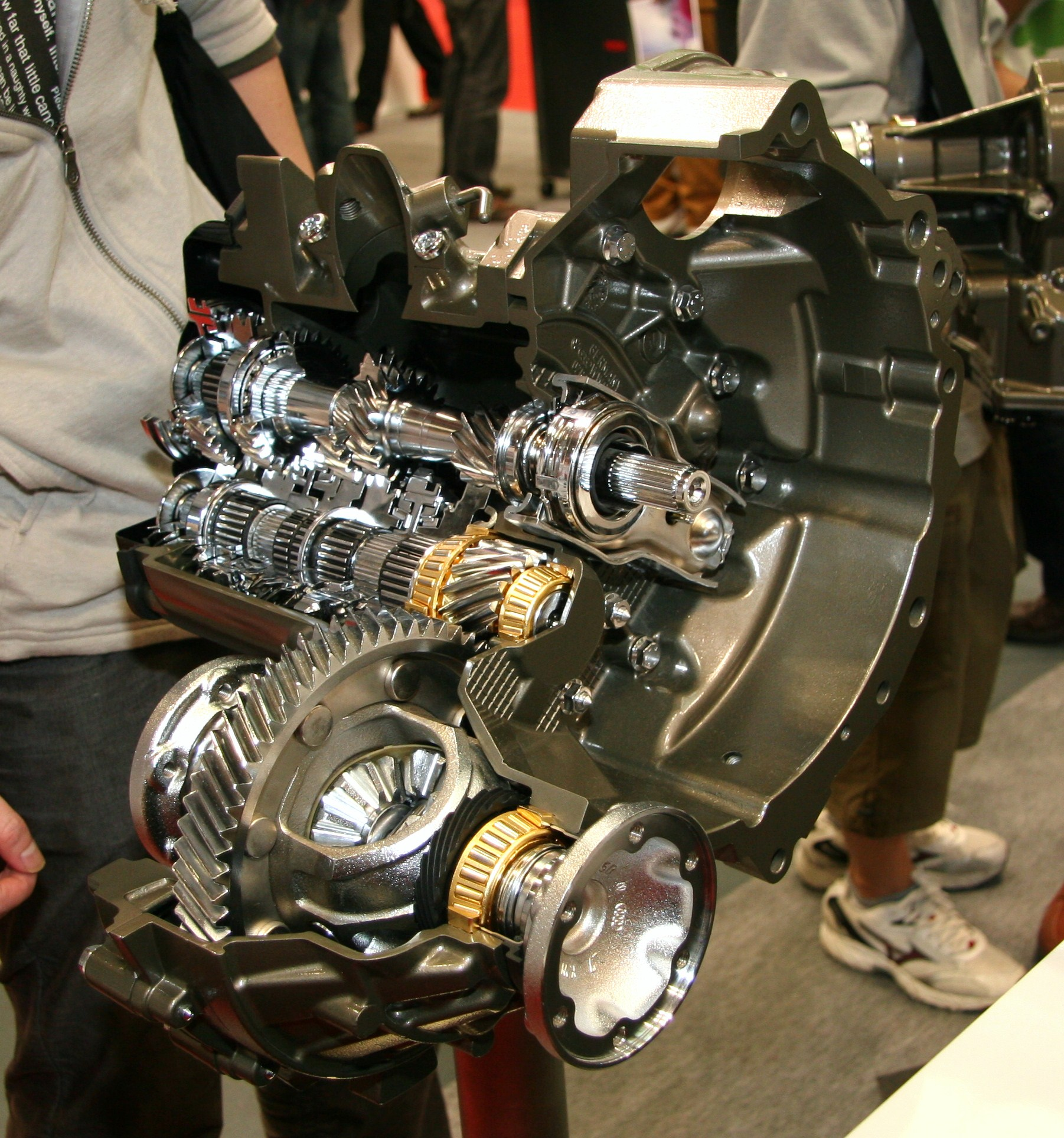
Front wheel drive manual transaxle, showing the gearbox and final drive incorporated in the same housing

- Clutch
- Motor
  - Gearbox
  - Final drive
  - Differential
  - Drive shafts and constant-velocity joints to each wheel

=== Four-wheel drive off-road vehicle ===
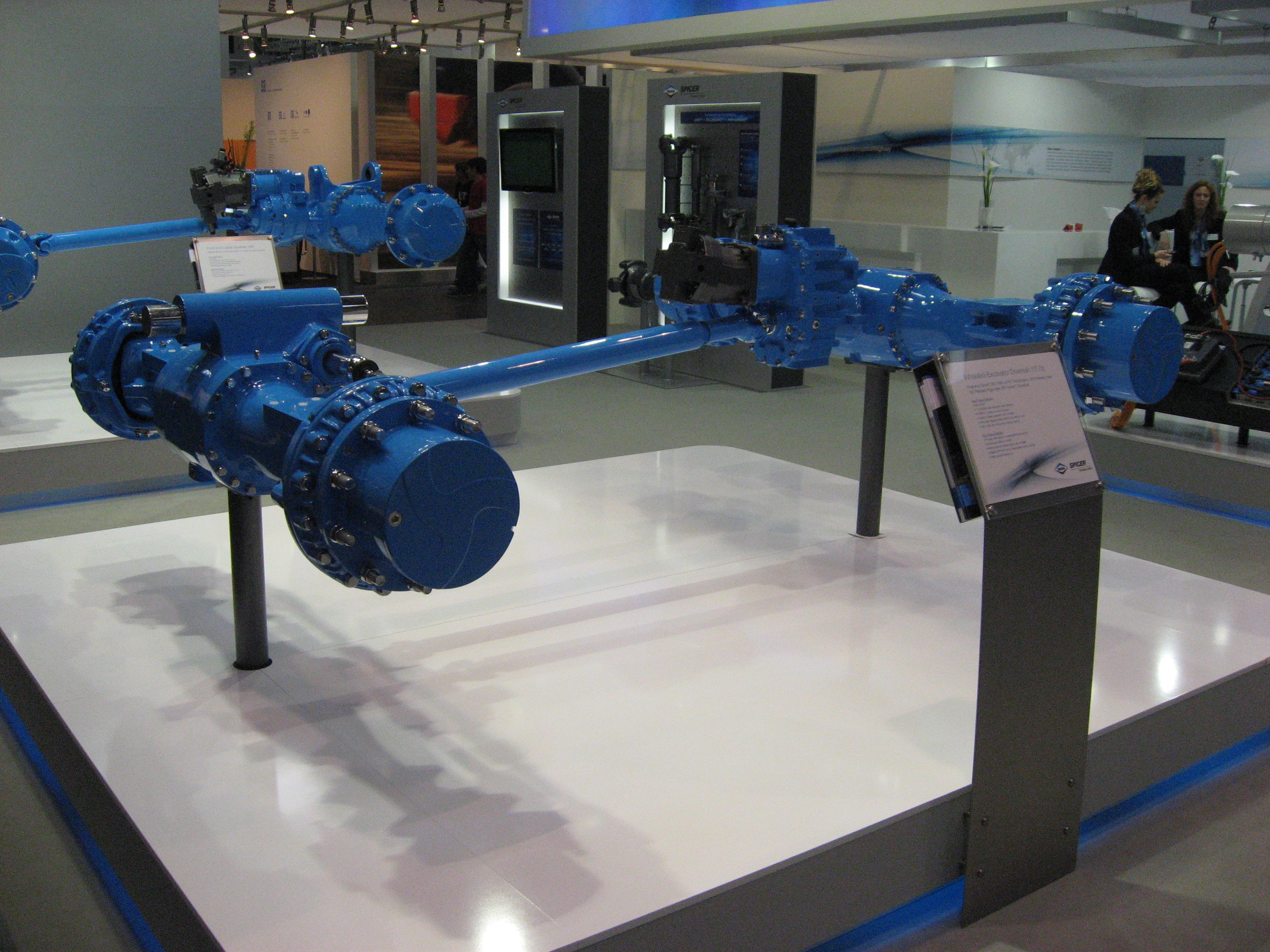
Construction vehicle drivetrain, with permanent all-wheel drive

- Clutch
- Gearbox
- Transfer box
- Transmission brake
- Propeller shafts, to front and rear
- Front and rear axles
  - Final drive
  - Locking differential
  - Portal gear

=== Final drive ===
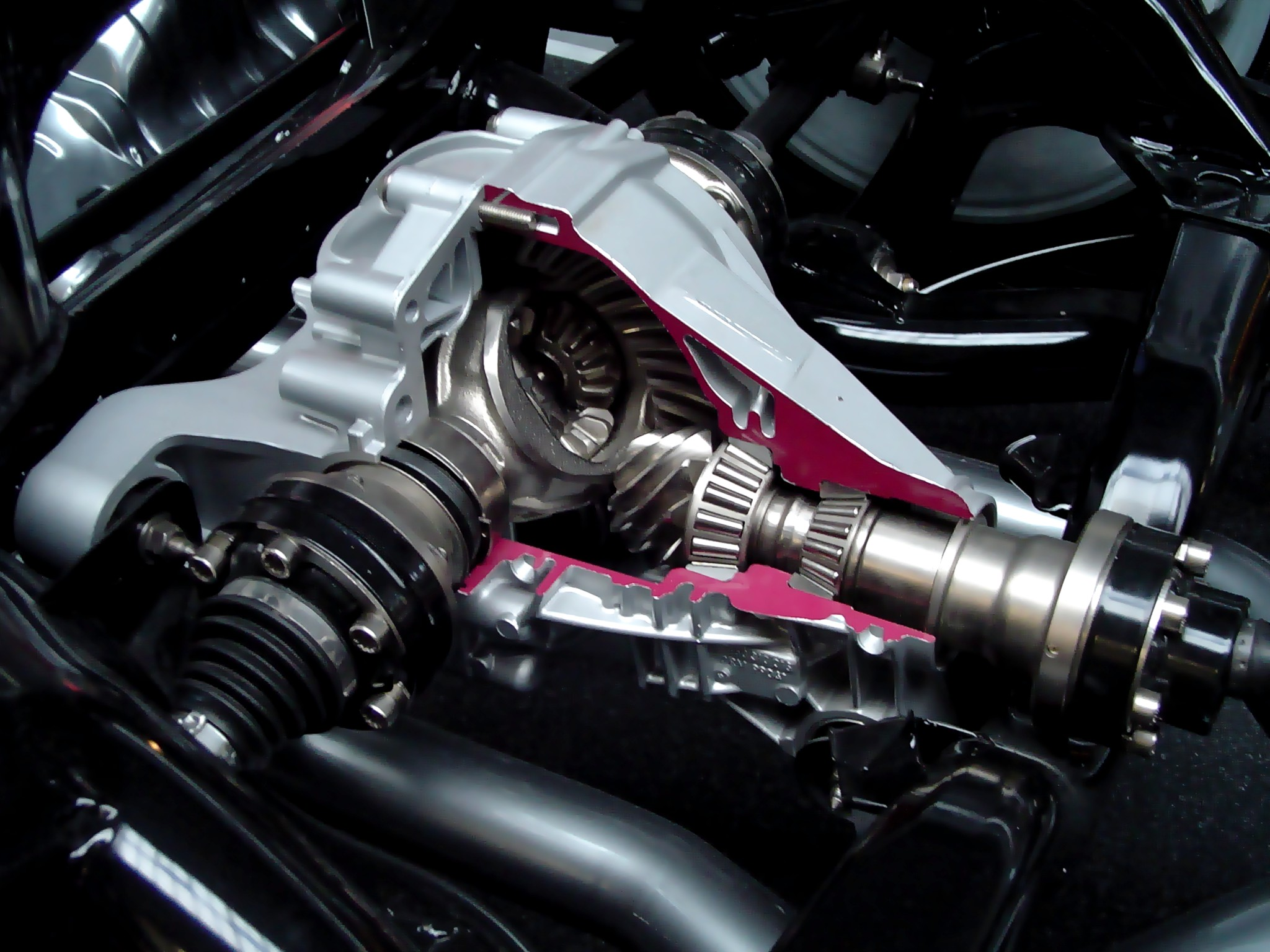
A cutaway view of an automotive final drive unit, which contains the differential

The final drive is the last in the set of components which delivers torque to the drive wheels. In a road vehicle, it incorporates the differential. In a railway vehicle, it sometimes incorporates the reversing gear. Examples include the Self-Changing Gears RF 28 (used in many first-generation diesel multiple units of British Railways) and RF 11 used in the British Rail Class 03 and British Rail Class 04 diesel shunting locomotives. In a motor vehicle, the powertrain consists of the source of propulsion (e.g. the engine or electric motor) and the drivetrain system which transfers this energy into forward movement of the vehicle.

=== Powertrain ===
==== Definition ====
The powertrain consists of the prime mover (e.g. an internal combustion engine and/or one or more traction motors) and the drivetrain - all of the components that convert the prime mover's power into movement of the vehicle (e.g. the transmission, driveshafts, differential and axles); whereas the drivetrain does not include the power source and consists of the transmission, driveshafts, differential and axles.

==== Power sources ====
Most passenger cars and commercial vehicles are powered by either an internal combustion engine, electric motor(s) or a combination of the two.

The most common types of internal combustion engines are:

- petrol engines
- diesel engines
- ethanol blends (such as E85 and E10)
- liquefied petroleum gas

Most purely electric vehicles use batteries for energy storage and are referred to as battery electric vehicles.

Vehicles with both internal combustion engines and electric motors are called hybrid vehicles. If a hybrid vehicle includes a charging socket, it is considered to be a plug-in hybrid, while vehicles that do not include a charging socket (therefore relying on the engine or regenerative braking to charge the batteries) are considered to be mild hybrids.

== See also ==
- Two-wheel drive – Type of drivetrain with two driven wheels
- Four-wheel drive – Type of drivetrain with four driven wheels
- 6×4 (drivetrain) – Type of drivetrain with 4 out of 6 driven wheels
- Six-wheel drive – Type of drivetrain with all six wheels driven
- Eight-wheel drive – Vehicle system with 8 powered wheels
- H-drive – Drivetrain for off-road vehicles
- Continuous track – System of vehicle propulsion
- Hybrid vehicle drivetrain – Systems vehicles with multiple power sources use to transmit power to the wheels, the drivetrain of hybrid vehicles
- Automotive safety – Study and practice to minimize the occurrence and consequences of motor vehicle accidents
- Driveline shunt
- Electric vehicle – Vehicle propelled fully or mostly by electricity
- Electric vehicle conversion – Process of converting a vehicle to use electric propulsion
- Giubo – Type of flexible coupling used to transmit rotational torque
- Gear train – Mechanical transmission using multiple gears
- Internal combustion engine – Engine in which fuel combusts with an oxidizer
- Propulsion transmission – Drivetrain transmitting propulsion power
