= Laycock Engineering =

Company

The Laycock Engineering Company Limited of Archer Road, Millhouses, Sheffield, Yorkshire, England was an engineering business established in 1884 by W S Laycock which made small and major components for railway rolling stock.

Laycock died in 1916, and in 1917 the business passed into the hands of Charron, a French automobile manufacturer, then later into receivership from where it was bought by Sheffield engineer and shipbreaker Thos. W. Ward in 1934. Two years later Laycock was bought from Ward by a group of investors and put into the ownership of a new holding company, Birfield Limited, along with Hardy Spicer. Both Laycock and Hardy Spicer made transmission or driveline components for the automotive industry.

In 1966 Birfield, with Laycock and Hardy Spicer, were bought by the GKN group which was entering the automotive components field following government's announcement of the intended nationalisation of its GKN Steel.

== Products ==
Laycock's initial business was the manufacture of railway carriage and steamship fittings and underframe gear for railway coaches and locomotives. The range was extended to include axles, gearboxes, and motor chassis components, motorcar propeller shafts and the Layrub rubber bushed propeller shaft.

After 25 years of importing goods from USA following annual visits W S Laycock introduced for the first time in UK a method of steam heating carriages in a Great Northern train in 1893 following a few years of experience with a similar system in USA.

The carriage interiors of the 1908 Southern Belle "the most luxurious train in the world" later known as the Brighton Belle were built by W S Laycock's business in Sheffield.

By 1964 Laycock's principal products were: Laycock de Normanville overdrives and spring diaphragm clutches for the motor industry and flexible couplings also for industrial use. Dual clutches for tractors, garage equipment, railway air and vacuum brakes, control valves for fluids and gases were also manufactured.

== Ownership ==
William Samuel Laycock (1842–1916) of Upper Hallam, Ecclesall Bierlow, later of Oakbrook, Yorkshire, established this business as his personal sideline to a family business which was his principal occupation until well into the twentieth century. The long-established family business, Samuel Laycock and Sons Limited with branches in Crewkerne and Lavenham, manufactured hair seating and hair fabrics. Horsehair was particularly suited to use in the confined space of railway carriages as it did not retain offensive odours. Blinds made of hair fabric also screened carriage occupants from unwelcome sunshine and attention.

W S Laycock was born in October 1842 and died 2 March 1916. In the 1911 census he described himself as a Government and Railway contractor of Oakbrook, Fulwood, Sheffield. At the time of his death he was also head, chairman of directors, of Cravens Limited. Laycock and his wife born Catherine Kirkby left no surviving children.

=== Charron Limited ===
Charron of Puteaux near Paris, a manufacturer of motorcars, bought a controlling interest in Laycock in 1917 and began the manufacture of aero-engines under contract to the British government. Charron-Laycock cars were sold between 1920 and 1926. A Receiver was appointed in 1924.

=== Thos. W. Ward ===
Sheffield engineering business Thos. W. Ward bought Laycock in November 1930 from the Receiver. At that time its products were of a specialised nature, mostly highly skilled precision machinery. More specifically: general engineering supplies and machinery, motor components, railway, tram, omnibus and motor coach equipment. Garage equipment. Aircraft supplies. Some of the most important customers were: Citroen, Daimler, Humber, Jowett, Morris, Riley, Rolls-Royce, Standard, Vauxhall and in commercial vehicles: AEC, Commer, Dennis, Guy Motors, Karrier, Leyland, Metro-Cammell and Morris Commercial.

In 1936, when Laycock had 700 employees, an agreement was reached between Thos. W. Ward and an investment trust led by Herbert Hill to buy Laycock. At the end of 1938 Laycock chairman Herbert Hill (1901–1987) then arranged that Laycock should be sold to a new owner named Birfield Engineering which would also buy Hardy Spicer.

=== Birfield Engineering and Front Wheel Drive ===
Herbert Hill led Birfield to develop the constant-velocity joint breakthrough which permitted reliable front-wheel drive and led to the development of the Mini and the subsequent popularity of front wheel drive cars. He retired in 1961 but remained a member of the board.

=== GKN ===
GKN bought Birfield and its subsidiaries Hardy Spicer and Laycock in 1966. Within GKN Laycock retained an individual identity until the late 1970s.
