= Constant-velocity joint =

Mechanisms for smoothly transmitting rotation through a bend in a drive shaft

A Rzeppa-type CV joint

A constant-velocity joint (also called a CV joint and homokinetic joint) is a mechanical connection between two rotating shafts, that keeps them rotating at the same speed, while allowing the shafts to be at an angle to each other as they rotate. This joint operates without an appreciable increase in friction or backlash and compensates for the angle between the two shafts, within a certain range of angles.

A common use of CV joints is in front-wheel drive vehicles, where they are used to transfer the engine's power to the front wheels while still allowing the wheels to steer.

== History ==
Animation of a universal joint

The predecessor to the constant-velocity joint was the universal joint (also called a Cardan joint) which was invented by Gerolamo Cardano in the 16th century. A short-coming of the universal joint is that the rotational speed of the output shaft fluctuates despite the rotational speed of the input shaft being constant. This fluctuation causes unwanted vibration in the system and increases as the angle between the two shafts increases. A constant-velocity joint does not have this fluctuation in output speed and therefore does not possess this unwanted vibration. Also, although universal joints are simple to produce and can withstand large forces, universal joints often become "notchy" and difficult to rotate as the angle of operation increases.

The first type of constant-velocity joint was the double Hooke's (double Cardan) joint which was invented by Robert Hooke in the 17th century. This design uses two universal joints connected by a shaft and offset by 90 degrees thereby cancelling out the speed variations inherent in each individual joint.

Many other types of constant-velocity joints have been invented since then.

== Types ==
=== Double Cardan joint ===
Double Cardan joint

Double Cardan joints are similar to Hooke's use of two universal joints except that the length of the intermediate shaft is shortened leaving only the yokes; this effectively allows the two Hooke's joints to be mounted back to back. Double Cardan joints are typically used in steering columns, as they eliminate the need to correctly phase the universal joints at the ends of the intermediate shaft, which eases packaging of the intermediate shaft around the other components in the engine bay of the car. They are also used to replace Rzeppa style constant-velocity joints in applications where high articulation angles, or impulsive torque loads are common, such as the driveshafts and halfshafts of rugged four-wheel drive vehicles.

To be truly constant-velocity, Double cardan joints require a centering element that will maintain equal angles between the driven and driving shafts. This centering device requires additional torque to accelerate the internals of the joint and does generate some additional vibration at higher speeds.

=== Tracta joints ===
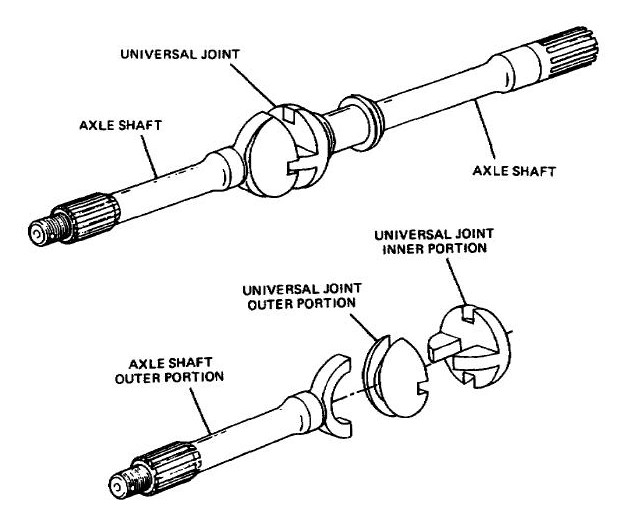
Tracta joint

The Tracta joint works on the principle of the double tongue and groove joint. It comprises only four individual parts: the two forks (a.k.a. yokes, one driving and one driven) and the two semi-spherical sliding pieces (one called male or spigot swivel and another called female or slotted swivel) which interlock in a floating (movable) connection. Each yoke jaw engages a circular groove formed on the intermediate members. Both intermediate members are coupled together in turn by a swivel tongue and grooved joint. When the input and output shafts are inclined at some working angle to each other, the driving intermediate member accelerates and decelerates during each revolution. Since the central tongue-and-groove joint is a quarter of a revolution out of phase with the yoke jaws, the corresponding speed fluctuation of the driven intermediate and output jaw members exactly counteracts and neutralizes the speed variation of the input half member. Thus the output speed change is identical to that of the input drive, providing constant velocity rotation.

=== Rzeppa joints ===
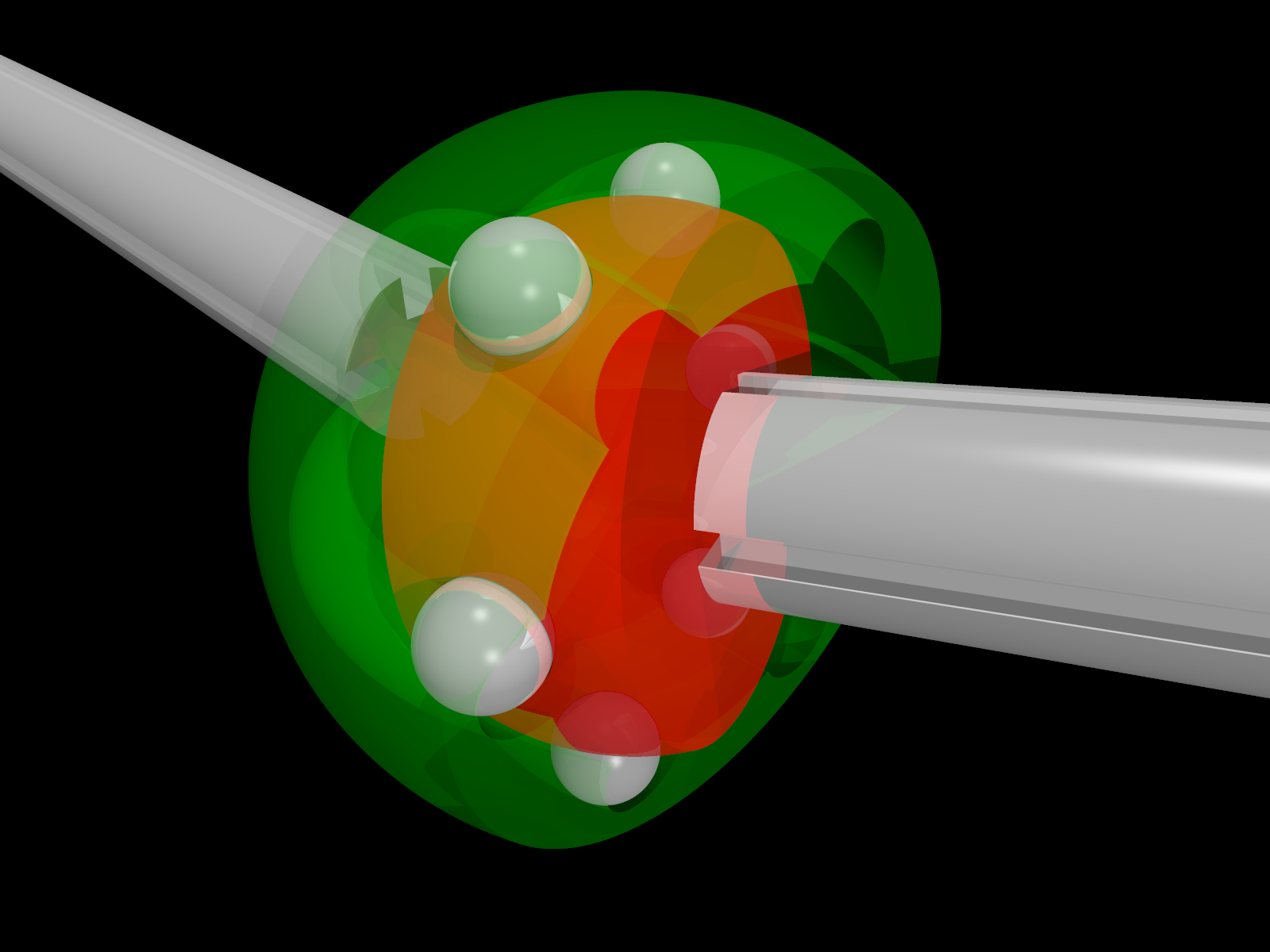
Rzeppa joint

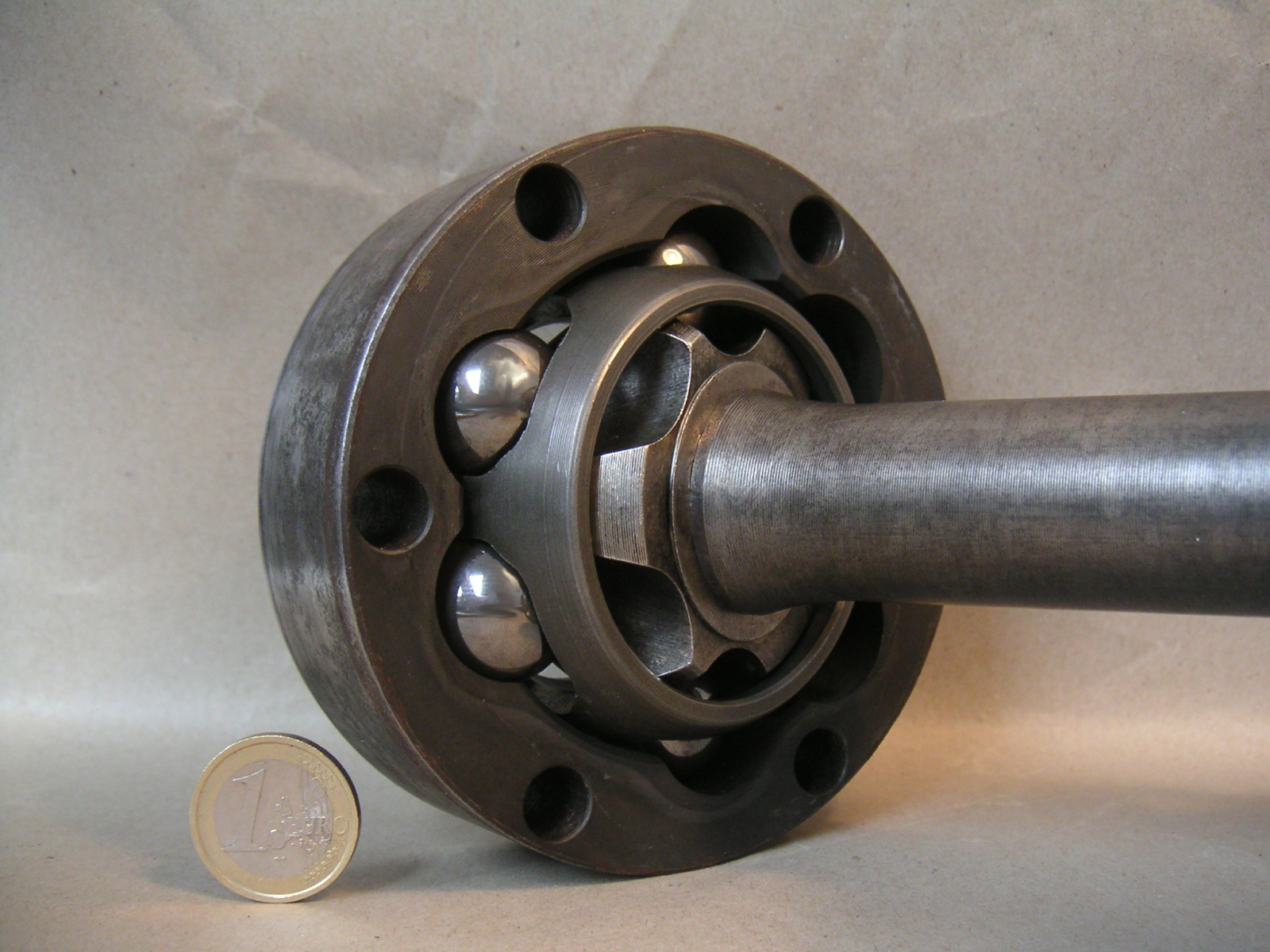
Rzeppa joint (compared to a 1 euro coin)

A Rzeppa joint (invented by Alfred H. Rzeppa in 1926) consists of a spherical inner shell with 6 grooves in it and a similar enveloping outer shell. Each groove guides one ball. The input shaft fits in the centre of a large, steel, star-shaped "gear" that nests inside a circular cage. The cage is spherical but with ends open, and it typically has six openings around the perimeter. This cage and gear fit into a grooved cup that has a splined and threaded shaft attached to it. Six large steel balls sit inside the cup grooves and fit into the cage openings, nestled in the grooves of the star gear. The output shaft on the cup then runs through the wheel bearing and is secured by the axle nut.

This joint can accommodate the large changes of angle when the front wheels are turned by the steering system; typical Rzeppa joints allow 45°–48° of articulation, while some can give 54°. At the "outboard" end of the driveshaft a slightly different unit is used. The end of the driveshaft is splined and fits into the outer "joint". It is typically held in place by a circlip.

=== Birfield joints ===
The Birfield joint is a type of constant-velocity joint based on the Rzeppa joint but confines the travel of the six balls using elliptical tracks. They have improved efficiency and are widely used in modern cars for the outboard driveshaft joints. The Birfield joint was developed by Birfield Industries and came into widespread use with the development of front-wheel drive cars such as the Mini.

=== Tripod joints ===
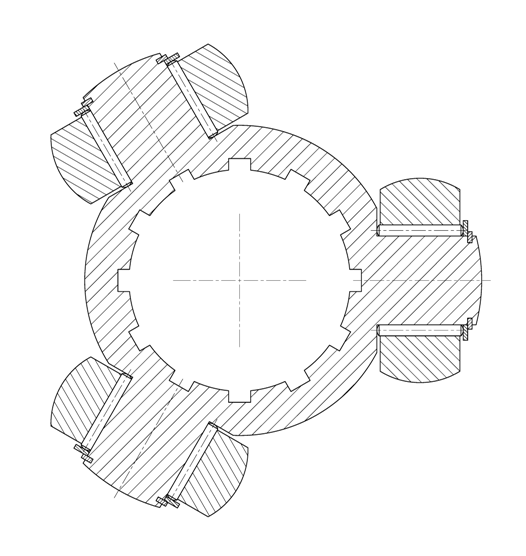
Tripod joint

Tripod joints are used at the inboard end of car driveshafts. The joints were developed by Michel Orain, of Glaenzer Spicer of Poissy, France. This joint has a three-pointed yoke attached to the shaft, which has barrel-shaped roller bearings on the ends. These fit into a cup with three matching grooves, attached to the differential. Since there is only significant movement in one axis, this simple arrangement works well. These also allow an axial 'plunge' movement of the shaft, so that engine rocking and other effects do not preload the bearings. A typical tripod joint has up to 50 mm of plunge travel, and 26 degrees of angular articulation. The tripod joint does not have as much angular range as many of the other joint types, but tends to be lower in cost and more efficient. Due to this it is typically used in rear-wheel drive vehicle configurations or on the inboard side of front-wheel drive vehicles where the required range of motion is lower.

=== Weiss joints ===
The Weiss joint (US patent 1677311, Carl W Weiss, "Universal joint") consists of two identical ball yokes which are positively located (usually) by four balls. The two joints are centered by means of a ball with a hole in the middle. Two balls in circular tracks transmit the torque while the other two preload the joint and ensure there is no backlash when the direction of loading changes.

Its construction differs from that of the Rzeppa in that the balls are a tight fit between two halves of the coupling and that no cage is used. The center ball rotates on a pin inserted in the outer race and serves as a locking medium for the four other balls. When both shafts are in line, that is, at an angle of 180 degrees, the balls lie in a plane that is 90 degrees to the shafts. If the driving shaft remains in the original position, any movement of the driven shaft will cause the balls to move one half of the angular distance. For example, when the driven shaft moves through an angle of 20 degrees, the angle between the two shafts is reduced to 160 degrees. The balls will move 10 degrees in the same direction, and the angle between the driving shaft and the plane in which the balls lie will be reduced to 80 degrees. This action fulfills the requirement that the balls lie in the plane that bisects the angle of drive. This type of Weiss joint is known as the Bendix-Weiss joint.

The most advanced plunging joint which works on the Weiss principle is the six-ball star joint of Kurt Enke. This type uses only three balls to transmit the torque, while the remaining three center and hold it together. The balls are preloaded and the joint is completely encapsulated.

=== Thompson joints ===
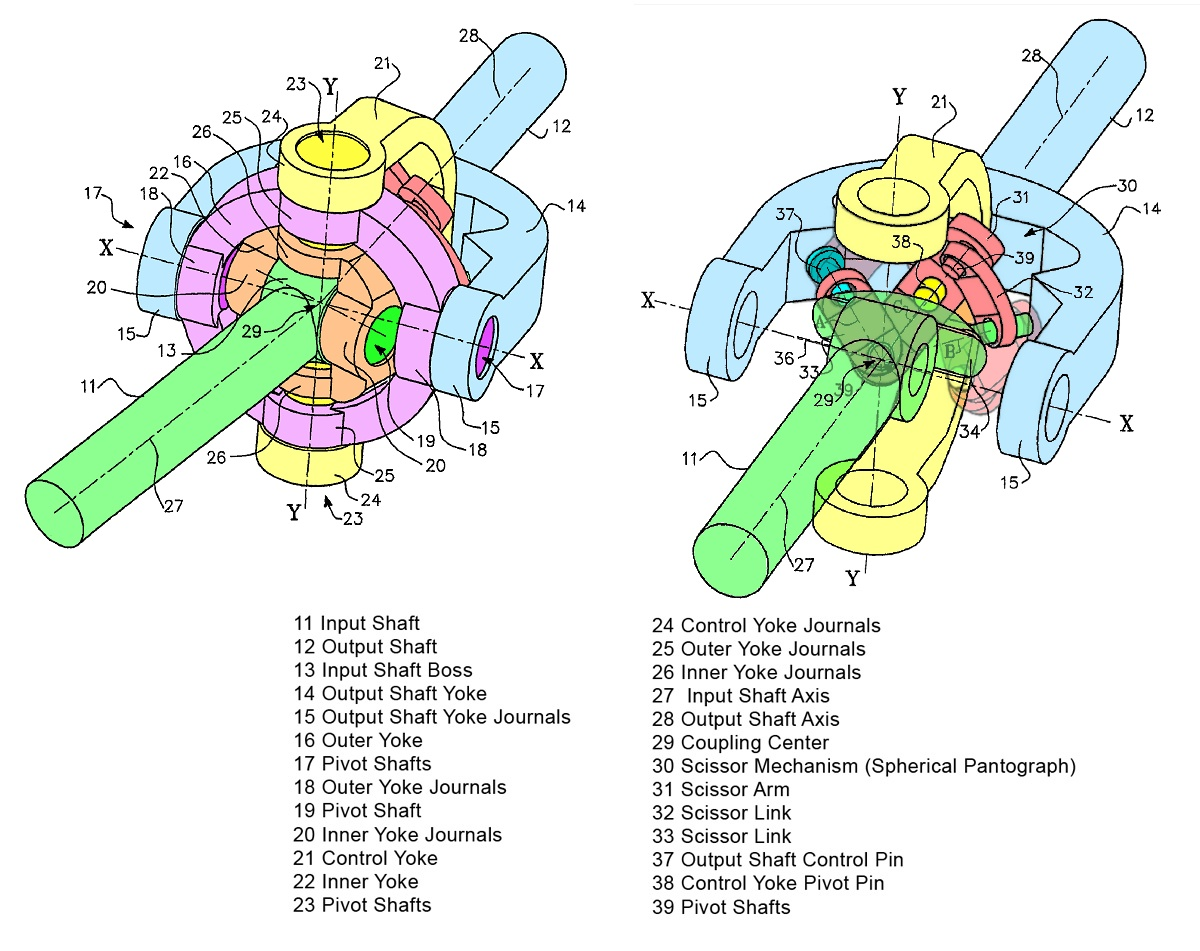
A diagram of a Thompson coupling

The Thompson joint (also known as a Thompson coupling) assembles two cardan joints within each other to eliminate the intermediate shaft. A control yoke is added to keep the input and output shafts aligned. The control yoke uses a spherical pantograph scissor mechanism to bisect the angle between the input and output shafts and to maintain the joints at a relative phase angle of zero. The alignment ensures constant angular velocity at all joint angles. Eliminating the intermediate shaft and keeping the input shafts aligned in the homokinetic plane greatly reduces the induced shear stresses and vibration inherent in double cardan shafts. While the geometric configuration does not maintain constant velocity for the control yoke that aligns the cardan joints, the control yoke has minimal inertia and generates little vibration. Continuous use of a standard Thompson coupling at a straight-through, zero-degree angle will cause excessive wear and damage to the joint; a minimum offset of 2 degrees between the input and output shafts is needed to reduce control yoke wear. Modifying the input and output yokes so that they are not precisely normal to their respective shafts can alter or eliminate the "disallowed" angles.

The novel feature of the coupling is the method for geometrically constraining the pair of cardan joints within the assembly by using, for example, a spherical four bar scissors linkage (spherical pantograph) and it is the first coupling to have this combination of properties.

== Usage in cars ==
Early front-wheel drive vehicles (such as the 1930s Citroen Traction Avant) and the front axles of off-road four-wheel drive vehicles used universal joints rather than CV joints. Amongst the first cars to use CV joints were the 1926 Tracta, the 1931 DKW F1 and the 1932 Adler Trumpf, all of which were front-wheel drive and used the Tracta joint design under licence. The CV joints allowed a smooth transfer of power over a wider range of operating angles (such as when the suspension is compressed by cornering force or a bump in the road).

Modern rear-wheel drive cars with independent rear suspension typically use CV joints at the ends of the half-shafts and increasingly use them on the tailshaft.

=== CV boots and lubrication ===
A separate flexible cover is usually installed over the CV joint, to protect it from foreign particles and prevent the lubricating grease from leaking out. This cover is usually made of rubber and called a "CV boot" or "CV gaiter". Cracks and splits in the boot will allow contaminants in, which would cause the joint to wear quickly or completely fail. An all-metal universal joint or CV located inside and protected by a solid axle (housing), swivel hub or closed knuckle may be desirable in harsh operating environments, where rubber is prone to physical or chemical damage. Metal armour and kevlar sleeves/covers may be used to protect rubber CV boots.

The CV joint is usually lubricated by molybdenum disulfide grease. The six spheres are bounded by an anti-fall gate that prevents the spheres from falling when the shafts are perfectly aligned.

== See also ==
- Hardy Spicer
- Hobson's joint
