= Juliana Hall =

American composer (born 1958)

Juliana Hall (born 1958) is an American composer of art songs, monodramas, and vocal chamber music. She has been described by the National Association of Teachers of Singing's (NATS) Journal of Singing as "one of our country's most able and prolific art song composers for almost three decades" and, in discussing her 1989 song cycle Syllables of Velvet, Sentences of Plush, the journal went on to assert that "Even at this very early stage in her life and career, Hall knew something about crafting music whose beauty could enhance the text at hand without drawing attention away from that text. This is masterful writing in every respect."

== Early life ==
Juliana Hall was born in Huntington, West Virginia, in 1958 and grew up across the river in Chesapeake, Ohio. Her mother was a pianist and began teaching Juliana piano when she was six years old. She was active in the family church, where she played, sang, and wrote her first composition. Her grandparents also provided inspiration, exposing Juliana to folk music and poetry.

Hall began her professional studies at the Cincinnati College-Conservatory of Music as a piano major (studying with Jeanne Kirstein). Still, her work in a composition for performers class demonstrated her potential as a composer. After Kirstein died, Hall completed the final year of her bachelor's degree at the University of Louisville (where she studied with Lee Luvisi). Upon graduation, she moved to New York City to study piano (with Seymour Lipkin), sing in the choir of Madison Avenue Presbyterian Church, and usher at Carnegie Hall.

After several years in New York, Hall went to graduate school at the Yale School of Music as a piano performance major (studying with Boris Berman), but also began formal composition lessons (with Martin Bresnick, Leon Kirchner, and Frederic Rzewski). At the urging of her composition teachers, she shifted her focus from piano to composition and, in 1987, earned her master's degree. She then went to Minneapolis to finish her formal composition studies (with Dominick Argento).

== Professional life ==
While a student of Argento, Hall received her first commission in 1987 (from the Schubert Club of Saint Paul, Minnesota) for a song cycle – Night Dances – for soprano Dawn Upshaw, who, with pianist Margo Garrett, premiered the work in December of that year. After a performance of the cycle at the Library of Congress in 1988, Joseph McLellan of The Washington Post wrote that, "Juliana Hall used every trick in the book – melodic and half-spoken, tonal and nontonal. She did this to...deepen the impact of the texts dealing with night and sleep, to explore the implicit emotions in sounds that ranged from a whisper to a scream, with the piano supplying illustrations and comment and engaging in vivid dialogue."

In 1989, Hall was awarded a Guggenheim Fellowship in Music Composition. Since that time, Hall has composed works for many singers, among them acclaimed countertenors Brian Asawa and Charles Humphries; mezzo-sopranos Stephanie Blythe and Kitty Whately; sopranos Nadine Benjamin and Molly Fillmore; tenor Anthony Dean Griffey; baritones Richard Lalli, David Malis and Randall Scarlata; and bass baritone Zachary James. She has also composed several chamber works for the vocal duo of Korliss Uecker and Tammy Hensrud, known as Feminine Musique.

Hall was awarded the 2017 Sorel Commission from the American art song training program SongFest for a soprano song cycle, When the South Wind Sings. She was later invited to be the 2018 Guest Composer at the Fall Island Vocal Arts Seminar at SUNY Potsdam, and was also invited to be the 2018 Resident Composer at CollabFest at the University of North Texas.

During her professional career, Hall's music has been performed in dozens of countries worldwide. In addition to the Library of Congress, other performances have been presented at venues including the 92nd Street Y, Ambassador Auditorium, Blackheath Halls, Corcoran Gallery of Art, the French Library, Herbst Theatre, Morgan Library & Museum, Ordway Theater, St Paul's Cathedral, Warehouse Waterloo, Weill Recital Hall at Carnegie Hall, and Wigmore Hall. Festival appearances include the Beverley Chamber Music Festival, Bitesize Proms, Buxton International Festival, Carmel Bach Festival, International Lied Festival Zeist, London Festival of American Music, London Song Festival, Norfolk Chamber Music Festival, Ojai Music Festival, Oxford Lieder Festival, Rhonefestival für Liedkunst, Salisbury International Arts Festival, Schumannfest Düsseldorf, Waterperry Opera Festival, and Tanglewood Music Center.

Groups performing Hall's music include ÆPEX Contemporary Performance, CHAI Collaborative Ensemble, Duo Emergence, Ensemble for These Times, Fourth Coast Ensemble, Mallarmé Chamber Players, Mirror Visions Ensemble, Prismatic Arts Ensemble, The Song Company, and Voices of Change. Art song organizations, opera companies, and other presenters programming Hall's music include Art Song Colorado, Baltimore Musicales, Boston Art Song Society, Calliope's Call, Cincinnati Song Initiative, Concerts of the Earth, Contemporary Undercurrent of Song Project, Dame Myra Hess Concert Series, dell'Arte Opera Ensemble, Joy in Singing, Lynx Project, Lyric Fest, MassOpera, Northern Ireland Opera, Opera on the Avalon, On Site Opera, Re-Sung, Seattle Art Song Society, Société d'Art Vocal de Montréal, Source Song Festival, Sparks & Wiry Cries, taNDem–Kunst und Kultur, and the Voces8 Foundation.

Hall's works have been broadcast over the BBC and NPR radio networks, classical stations including WFMT (Chicago), WQXR (New York) and WGBH (Boston), and overseas stations including Radio France (Paris), Radio Monalisa (Amsterdam), Radio Horizon (Johannesburg), RTVE Radio C (Madrid), and Radio SRF 2 Kultur (Zürich). Commercial recordings have been issued on the Albany, Arsis Audio, Blue Griffin, MSR Classical, Navona, Solo Musica, Stone Records, and Vienna Modern Masters labels.

Juliana Hall's art song catalogue was signed by publisher E. C. Schirmer in 2017. One earlier song cycle, Syllables of Velvet, Sentences of Plush, was published by Boosey & Hawkes in 1995.

== Vocal works ==
- Ahab (2020) – monodrama for baritone or bass baritone and piano on a libretto by Caitlin Vincent
- And It Came To Pass (2018) – canticle for countertenor and piano on the Nativity Story from the Biblical Gospel of Luke
- A Northeast Storm (2015) – song for soprano and piano on a letter of Emily Dickinson
- A Pocketful of Peacock (2024) – 4 songs for countertenor and piano on poems by Walter de la Mare
- At That Hour When All Things Have Repose (2023) – song for baritone and piano on a poem by James Joyce
- A World Turned Upside Down (2016) – 7 songs for soprano and piano on excerpts from The Diary of a Young Girl by Anne Frank
- Bells and Grass (1989) – 5 songs for soprano and oboe on poems by Walter de la Mare
- Bredon Hill (2020) – song for tenor and piano on a poem by A. E. Housman
- Buffalo Dusk (2023) – song for soprano, mezzo soprano, or tenor and piano on a poem by Carl Sandburg
- Cameos (2017) – 6 songs for soprano and piano on poems by Molly Fillmore
- Cameos (2018) – 6 songs for mezzo soprano and piano on poems by Molly Fillmore
- Christina's World (2016) – 5 songs for soprano and piano on poems by Christina Rossetti
- Christmas Eve (2013) – song for soprano and organ on the poem by Christina Rossetti
- Death's Echo (1992) – 5 songs for baritone and piano on poems by W. H. Auden
- Dreams in War Time (2003) – 7 songs for mezzo-soprano and piano on poems by Amy Lowell
- Fables for a Prince (1990) – 6 songs for soprano, mezzo-soprano, tenor, baritone, and piano on fables of Jean de La Fontaine
- Frost Bites (2024) – 3 songs for baritone and piano on poems by Robert Frost
- Godiva (2019) – monodrama for soprano or mezzo-soprano and piano on a libretto by Caitlin Vincent
- Great Camelot (2016) – 3 songs for tenor and piano on poems by Sameer Dahar
- How Do I Love Thee? (2015) – 5 songs for soprano and piano by Elizabeth Barrett Browning
- I Can No Other Answer Make (2016) – song for tenor and piano on excerpts from Twelfth Night by William Shakespeare
- I Know a River Wide and Deep (2017) – song for soprano and piano on a poem by Amelia Forrester Petersen
- In Closer Bonds of Love to Thee (2017) – song for soprano and piano on a hymn text by Fanny J. Crosby
- In Reverence (1985) – 5 songs for soprano and piano on poems by Emily Dickinson
- In Spring (2016) – 3 songs for unaccompanied solo soprano on poems by E. E. Cummings
- Julie–Jane (2007) – 5 songs for baritone and piano on poems by Thomas Hardy
- Leaving Gatsby (2022) – monodrama for soprano and piano on a libretto by Caitlin Vincent
- Leaving Gatsby (2025) – monodrama for soprano and chamber ensemble on a libretto by Caitlin Vincent
- Letters from Edna (1993) – 8 songs for mezzo-soprano and piano on letters of Edna St. Vincent Millay
- Look Twice (2023) – 5 songs for mezzo-soprano and piano on poems by Antigoni Gaitana
- Love's Pilgrimage (2000) – 5 songs for baritone and piano on sonnets by William Shakespeare
- Lovestars (1989) – 5 songs for soprano, cello, and piano on poems by E. E. Cummings
- Marguerite (2025) – monodrama for soprano, flute, cello, and piano on a libretto by Lisa Moore
- Music Like a Curve of Gold (2015) – 2 songs for soprano, mezzo-soprano, and piano on poems by Sara Teasdale
- Night Dances (1987) – 6 songs for soprano and piano on poems by Elizabeth Bishop, Emily Brontë, Emily Dickinson, and Edna St. Vincent Millay
- Nine Steins (2023) – 9 songs for soprano and piano on poems by Gertrude Stein
- Nocturne of Remembered Spring (2020) – setting for baritone and piano of the poem by Conrad Aiken
- Of That So Sweet Imprisonment (2017) – 7 songs for contralto and piano on poems by James Joyce
- Old (2021) – song for mezzo soprano and piano on a haiku by Christina Kelly
- O Mistress Mine (2015) – 12 songs for countertenor and piano on texts from plays of William Shakespeare
- One Art (2003) – 4 songs for mezzo-soprano and cello on poems by Elizabeth Bishop
- Paradise (1999) – 5 songs for soprano and piano on poems by Emily Dickinson
- Paw and Tail (2024) – 10 songs for soprano or mezzo soprano and piano on texts by Caitlin Vincent
- Peace On Earth (2019) – song for soprano and piano on a poem by William Carlos Williams
- Peacock Pie (1992) – 20 songs for tenor and piano on poems by Walter de la Mare
- Piano Lessons (2018) – 6 songs for tenor and piano on poems by Billy Collins
- Poets of the Dawn (2023) – 5 songs for baritone or bass baritone and piano on poems by Henry Wadsworth Longfellow
- Propriety (1992) – 5 songs for soprano and piano on poems by Marianne Moore
- Roosters (2016) – setting for soprano, mezzo-soprano, and piano of the poem by Elizabeth Bishop
- Seeker of Truth (2006) – 14 songs for soprano, mezzo-soprano, tenor, alto and baritone saxophones (one player), cello, and pianist on poems by E. E. Cummings
- Sentiment (2020) – monodrama for unaccompanied solo mezzo soprano on texts by Caitlin Vincent
- Sentiment (2017) – monodrama for unaccompanied solo soprano on texts by Caitlin Vincent
- Setting Sail (2022) – 12 songs for soprano, mezzo soprano, or tenor and piano on poems by Emily Dickinson
- Songs for the End of Time (2025) – 5 songs for baritone and piano on poems by Dana Gioia
- Songs of Enchantment (1989) – 10 songs for soprano or mezzo soprano and piano on poems by Walter de la Mare
- Strike for the Heart (2025) – 5 songs for contralto and piano on poems by W. H. Auden
- Syllables of Velvet, Sentences of Plush (1989) – 7 songs for soprano and piano on letters of Emily Dickinson
- That Delicate Dance (2024) – 5 songs for soprano and piano on poems by Kim Josephson
- The Bells (2014) – setting for soprano and piano of the poem by Edgar Allan Poe
- Theme in Yellow (1990) – 7 songs for mezzo-soprano and piano on poems by Robert Frost, Amy Lowell, Edna St. Vincent Millay, and Carl Sandburg
- The Holy Sonnets of John Donne (2013) – 9 songs for tenor and piano on sonnets of John Donne
- The Mystic Trumpeter (2021) – setting for tenor and piano of the poem by Walt Whitman
- The New Colossus (2018) – setting for baritone and piano of the poem by Emma Lazarus
- The Poets (2015) – 5 songs for bass and piano on poems by Henry Wadsworth Longfellow
- The Poet's Calendar (1999) – 12 songs for tenor and piano on poems by Henry Wadsworth Longfellow
- The Walrus and the Carpenter (1992) – setting for soprano, oboe, clarinet, and bassoon of the poem by Lewis Carroll
- Thirteen Ways of Looking at a Blackbird (2020) – setting for soprano or mezzo-soprano and alto saxophone of the poem by Wallace Stevens
- Through the Guarded Gate (2018) – 5 songs for mezzo-soprano and piano on poems by Margaret Widdemer
- To Meet A Flower (2009) – 3 songs for soprano and piano on poems by Emily Dickinson
- Tornado (2019) – song for soprano and piano on a poem by Kathleen Kelly
- Two Old Crows (2020) – song for soprano and piano on a poem by Vachel Lindsay
- Upon This Summer's Day (2009) – 3 songs for soprano and piano on poems by Emily Dickinson
- When the South Wind Sings (2017) – 7 songs for soprano and piano on poems by Carl Sandburg
- Winter Windows (1989) – 7 songs for baritone and piano on poems by Walter de la Mare, Henry Wadsworth Longfellow, Edna St. Vincent Millay, and Percy Byssche Shelley
- Winter Windows 2023) – 7 songs for mezzo soprano and piano on poems by Walter de la Mare, Henry Wadsworth Longfellow, Edna St. Vincent Millay, and Percy Byssche Shelley
- Woods in Winter (2014) – song for baritone and piano on a poem by Henry Wadsworth Longfellow

== Instrumental works ==
- A Certain Tune (2009) – 5 songs for English horn solo, based on poems by Sara Teasdale
- A Certain Tune (2021) – 5 songs for flute solo, based on poems by Sara Teasdale
- Crucifixus (2010) – piece for cello and piano, based on the story of the Passion from the Gospels of Luke, Mark and Matthew
- Ding Dong Bell (2007) – 8 epitaphs for cello solo, based on epitaphs by Walter de la Mare
- Dream of the Rood (2012) – piece for cello and piano, based on an anonymous 7th-century Anglo-Saxon poem
- Evening Sun (2015) – short piece for piano solo
- Orpheus Singing (2010) – 5 songs for alto saxophone and piano, based on sonnets by Rainer Maria Rilke
- Rilke Song (2013) – song for English horn and piano, based on a sonnet by Rainer Maria Rilke
- The Ballad of Barnaby (2010) – ballad for cello solo, based on the poem by W. H. Auden
- The Ballad of Barnaby (2021) – ballad for viola solo, based on the poem by W. H. Auden
- Two-Bit Variations (2010) – variations for piano solo on the theme "Shave and a Haircut, Two Bits!"
