= Anchovy, Jamaica =

Anchovy
- Town
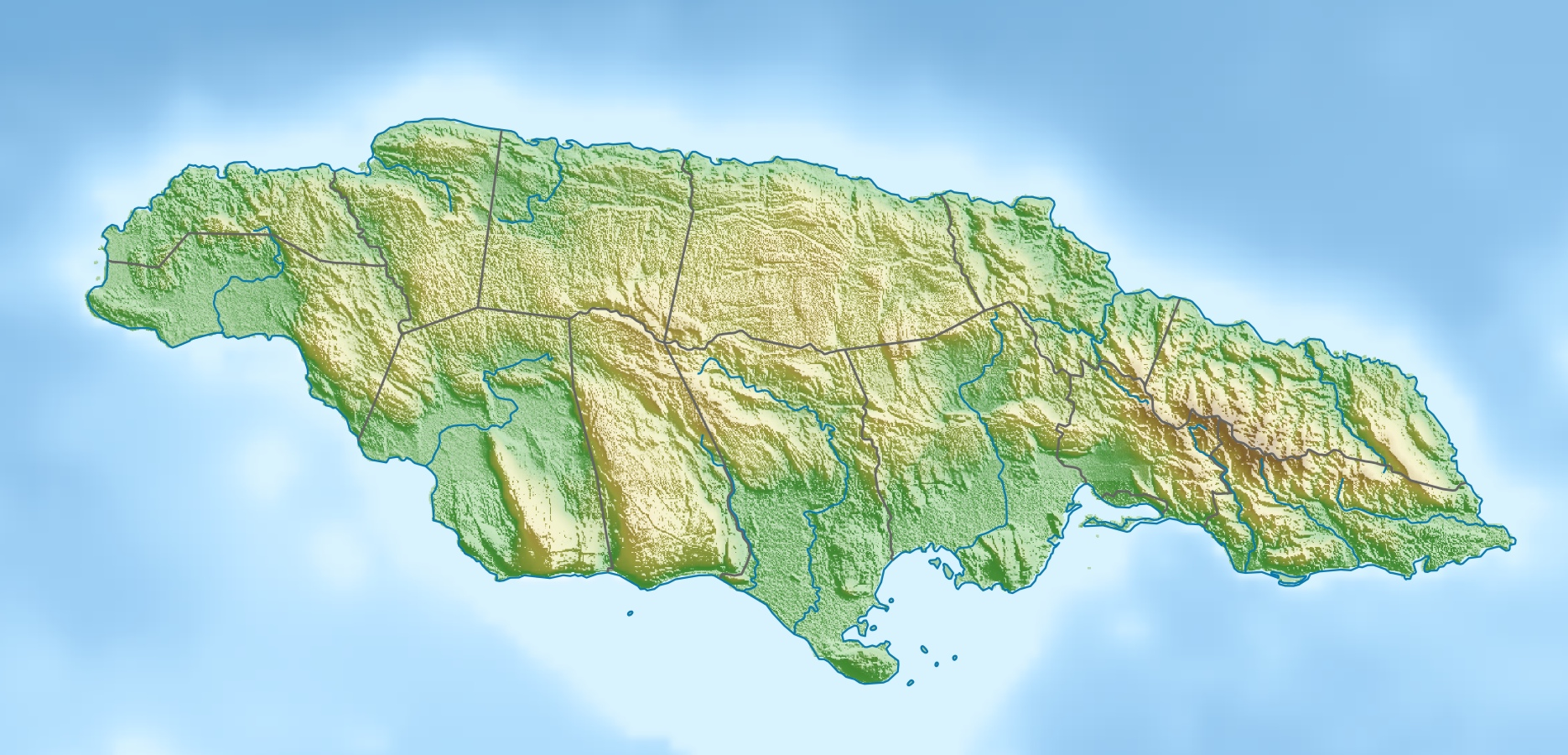
- Location in Yard
- Coordinates: 18°24′35″N 77°56′02″W
- Country: Jamaica
- Parish: Saint James
- Elevation: 275 m (902 ft)

Population (1991)
  - Total: 3,633
  - Estimate (2010): 4,269
- Time zone: UTC-05:00 (EST)

Anchovy is a small town in the parish of Saint James in northwestern Jamaica. It is located 7 kilometres (4.3 mi) southwest of Montego Bay.

== Transport ==
=== Road ===
Anchovy is on the B8 road which runs from Savanna-la-Mar on the south coast to Reading on the north coast.

=== Rail ===
From 1895 to 1992 Anchovy was served by Anchovy railway station on the Kingston to Montego Bay railway. Although all services on the line have ceased, the station building remains, however in serious disrepair.

== Public amenities ==
There is a primary school, post office, police station, electoral office, several churches, as well as various small retail outlets. Anchovy High School attracts students from the Montego Bay area and has a long-standing exchange link with St Martin-in-the-Fields High School for Girls, Tulse Hill, London which is documented in the Anchovy High School library.

== Employment and economic activities ==
Unemployment for School leavers and Young adults (18-25 yrs) is high, especially among males, and is estimated to be approximately 60 percent. Employment opportunities mainly reside in the tourist and hotel industries that are concentrated in and around Montego Bay. Other self-employed persons engage in farming, transportation (drivers of taxis, buses, etc.), vending, and automobile repair, to name a few.

A few warehouses for businesses that are domiciled in Montego Bay are also present.
