= Reginald Ellingworth =

English sailor (1898–1940)

Reginald Vincent Ellingworth
- Born: 28 January 1898; Wolverhampton
- Died: 21 September 1940 (aged 42); Dagenham, Essex
- Burial place: Milton Cemetery, Portsmouth
- Military career
- Allegiance: United Kingdom
- Branch: Royal Navy
- Rank: Chief Petty Officer
- Service number: P/J26011
- Unit: HMS Vernon
- Conflicts: First World War; Second World War: Home Front; The Blitz †
- Awards: George Cross

Chief Petty Officer Reginald Vincent Ellingworth, GC (28 January 1898 – 21 September 1940) was a sailor in the Royal Navy.

Ellingworth was born in Wolverhampton, Staffordshire, to Frank and Kate Louise.

He was posthumously awarded the George Cross for the "great gallantry and undaunted devotion to duty" he displayed while attempting to defuse a parachute mine that had fallen in Dagenham, Essex, during the Blitz, along with Lieutenant Commander Richard John Hammersley Ryan and Dick Moore. Notice of his award appeared in a supplement to the London Gazette of 17 December 1940.

The soldiers had defused many such devices together, and had just successfully defused a device in Hornchurch which was threatening an aerodrome and explosives factory when they were called to Dagenham. The bomb there was hanging from its parachute on a warehouse. He is buried at Milton Cemetery, Portsmouth.

He was married to Rose Ward until her death in 1925. He remarried Jessie Day Phillips.
