= Dick Sheppard School =

Location
- Tulse Hill; Lambeth, London; England; 51°27′01″N 0°06′44″W

Information
- Type: Secondary Comprehensive
- Established: 1955
- Closed: 1994
- Gender: Girls then Mixed
- Age: 11 to 18

Dick Sheppard School was a large school, originally for girls, at Tulse Hill in the London Borough of Lambeth. It was founded as the sister establishment to Tulse Hill School for boys and as the Comprehensive alternative to St Martin-In-The-Fields High School for Girls. In the late 1970s it absorbed the remaining male pupils of nearby Strand School and continued as a co-educational school until its closure in 1994.

== History ==
The school was established by the London County Council in 1955. It was named after the Anglican clergyman, Dick Sheppard, noted for turning St Martin-in-the-Fields church into a social centre for the needy and destitute of central London. The name thus resonated with that of the local girls’ grammar school, St Martin-In-The-Fields High School. The school was at its inception well equipped and, like Tulse Hill School, was seen at the time as in the vanguard of comprehensive education.

In 1972 the Inner London Education Authority proposed that Strand School be closed and its pupils transferred to Dick Sheppard. The Strand and Tulse Hill buildings, within close proximity of each other, were to form a single new comprehensive school. Margaret Thatcher, at the time the Secretary of State for Education, approved the closure but not the alterations to Tulse Hill, or the proposed extensions to Dick Sheppard. Parents of Strand pupils chose to contest the closure in the courts. As a result, an injunction forbidding closure was granted in May 1972; and a second application to the minister, in July 1972, was turned down in January of the following year. Noting the objections of those who were particularly concerned to retain a local comprehensive school for girls, Thatcher stated in the House of Commons that to make the school a co-educational establishment would be to go against those wishes. By the late 1970s, however, Strand School was closed down. Its remnants were merged with Dick Sheppard, resulting in its becoming a co-educational school after all.

In January 1982 there was a visit by The Prince and Princess of Wales. However the 1980s soon brought controversy. Janet Boateng, the first black chairman of governors within the ILEA, when ousted by her own Labour Party group in 1983, accused the school of "deep seated racism". In 1984 Dick Sheppard was one of four schools in the country featured in a Daily Express enquiry into "Britain's failing comprehensive schools", and was later in the vanguard of schools engaged in 'non-competitive sport' which attracted national varied interest. An unofficial walk-out by the staff in support of Cherry Groce produced the headline in The Daily Telegraph: Children 'ran wild in NUT walk-out', an occasion when discipline was described by Inner London Education Authority member Anne Sofer as "completely out of hand". The incident also featured in a House of Lords debate on 5 February 1986 by Lord Ritchie of Dundee (Hansard cc 1175).

By 1987 The Observer described the school as a "ray of hope...now making strenuous efforts to improve itself, not without success", while The London Evening Standard in a 'fact file' on the area listed the school as "one of the best".

The school continued as such until it was itself closed down in 1994. Lambeth Council was quoted as saying that Dick Sheppard was closed because "like many other schools in the area, it was failing." The supposed "near bankruptcy" of the local education authority has also been suggested. The site was sold by Lambeth Council in 1997 for £10 million to make way for luxury housing.

== Head Teachers ==
- Mrs Margaret Solan
- Miss Jessie Edwards
- Mrs Margaret Broadley
- Paul S Farmer MBE (1983–87 – Deputy Head from 1981)
- Norma Gibbes (1987–1989 – Deputy from 1985)
- Philip Lawrence QGM
- Doreen Hall (1991-closure)

== Alumni ==
- Paulette Randall, actor and producer.
- Tim Roth, actor, who joined Dick Sheppard on the closure of Strand School (see above).
- Nicola Armstrong Edgar, nee MacPherson, international diplomat and global chief executive.
- Douglas Ankrah, inventor of the porn star martini and owner of the LAB bar in Soho in 1999, and Townhouse in Knightsbridge
