= D-Day Daily Telegraph crossword security alarm =

Suspected espionage case during WW2

In 1944, codenames related to the D-Day plans appeared as solutions in crosswords in the British newspaper The Daily Telegraph, which the British Secret Services initially suspected to be a form of espionage.

== Background ==
Leonard Dawe, Telegraph crossword compiler, created these puzzles at his home in Leatherhead. Dawe was headmaster of Strand School, which had been evacuated to Effingham, Surrey. Adjacent to the school was a large camp of US and Canadian troops preparing for D-Day, and as security around the camp was lax, there was unrestricted contact between the schoolboys and soldiers. Some of the soldiers' chatter, including D-Day codewords, may thus have been heard and learnt by some of the schoolboys.

Dawe had developed a habit of saving his crossword-compiling work time by calling boys into his study to fill crossword blanks with words; afterwards Dawe would provide clues for those words. As a result, war-related words including those codenames got into the crosswords; Dawe said later that at the time he did not know that these words were military codewords.

On 18 August 1942, a day before the Dieppe raid, 'Dieppe' appeared as an answer in The Daily Telegraph crossword (set on 17 August 1942) (clued "French port"), causing a security alarm. The War Office suspected that the crossword had been used to pass intelligence to the enemy and called upon Lord Tweedsmuir, then a senior intelligence officer attached to the Canadian Army, to investigate the crossword. Tweedsmuir, the son of author John Buchan, later commented: "We noticed that the crossword contained the word "Dieppe", and there was an immediate and exhaustive inquiry which also involved MI5. But in the end it was concluded that it was just a remarkable coincidence – a complete fluke".

== D-Day alarm ==
In the months before D-Day the solution words 'Gold' and 'Sword' (codenames for the two D-Day beaches assigned to the British) and 'Juno' (codename for the D-Day beach assigned to Canada) appeared in The Daily Telegraph crossword solutions, but they are common words in crosswords, and were treated as coincidences. The run of D-Day codewords as The Daily Telegraph crossword solutions continued:

- 2 May 1944: 'Utah' (17 across, clued as "One of the U.S."): code name for the D-Day beach assigned to the US 4th Infantry Division (Utah Beach). This would have been treated as another coincidence.
- 22 May 1944: 'Omaha' (3 down, clued as "Red Indian on the Missouri"): code name for the D-Day beach to be taken by the US 1st Infantry Division (Omaha Beach).
- 27 May 1944: 'Overlord' (11 across, clued as "[common]... but some bigwig like this has stolen some of it at times.", code name for the whole D-Day operation: Operation Overlord)
- 30 May 1944: 'Mulberry' (11 across, clued as "This bush is a centre of nursery revolutions.", Mulberry harbour)
- 1 June 1944: 'Neptune' (15 down, clued as "Britannia and he hold to the same thing.", codeword for the naval phase: Operation Neptune).

== Investigation ==
MI5 became involved and arrested Dawe and a senior colleague, crossword compiler Melville Jones. Both were interrogated intensively, but it was decided that they were innocent, although Dawe nearly lost his job as a headmaster. Afterwards, Dawe asked at least one of the boys (Ronald French) where he had got these codewords from, and he was alarmed at the contents of the boy's notebook.

He gave him a severe reprimand about secrecy and national security during wartime, ordered the notebook to be burnt, and ordered the boy to swear secrecy on the Bible. It was announced publicly that the leakage of codenames was a coincidence. Dawe kept his interrogation secret until he described it in a BBC interview in 1958.

== Aftermath ==
In 1984, the approach of the 40th anniversary of D-Day reminded people of the crossword incident, causing a check for any codewords related to the 1982 Falklands War in The Daily Telegraph crosswords set around the time of that war; none were found. That induced Ronald French, then a property manager in Wolverhampton, to come forward to say that in 1944, when he was a 14-year-old at the Strand School, he inserted D-Day codenames into crosswords. He believed that hundreds of children must have known what he knew.

A fictionalised version of the story appeared in The Mountain and the Molehill in series 1 of the BBC One Screen One anthology series, first broadcast on 15 October 1989. Written by David Reid and directed by Moira Armstrong, it starred Michael Gough as Mr Maggs, a school headmaster based on Dawe. Another fictionalised version appeared in the Norwegian children's book Kodeord Overlord (Codeword Overlord), written by Tor Arve Røssland and published by Vigmostad&Bjørke publishing house in 2019, whose main character is also based on Dawe.

A book by Richard Denham - Weird War Two - questions the veracity of the accepted account: “In a country so paranoid as to verge on obsession, where ‘careless talk costs lives,’ how feasible is it that the local troops would have known those codes, spoken openly about them, and that the schoolboys would have found the random names so convincing as to have unknowingly passed them on to Dawe?”
