= Dick Moore (Royal Navy officer) =

English naval officer (1916–2003)

Richard Valentine Moore
- Born: 14 February 1916; London, England
- Died: 25 April 2003 (aged 87); Warrington, England
- Military career
- Allegiance: United Kingdom
- Branch: Royal Naval Volunteer Reserve
- Service years: 1939–1946
- Rank: Lieutenant Commander
- Unit: HMS President
- Conflicts: Second World War: The Blitz
- Awards: George Cross; Commander of the Order of the British Empire
- Other work: Scientist with the Atomic Energy Authority

Richard Valentine Moore, GC, CBE (14 February 1916 – 25 April 2003) was an officer of Royal Naval Volunteer Reserve who was awarded the George Cross for the "great gallantry and undaunted devotion to duty" he showed in rendering mines safe during the Blitz of 1940 despite having "no practical training".

== Early life ==
Moore was born in London in 1916 and educated at the Strand School and at University of London, where he obtained a degree in mechanical engineering. He worked for the County of London Electricity Supply Company from 1936 until war was declared in September 1939.

Commissioned into the Royal Naval Volunteer Reserve in 1939, he joined the Naval Unexploded Bomb Department from HMS Effingham, serving as an assistant torpedo officer.

== Second World War ==
In 1940, the Luftwaffe began bombing British ports. They also mined the approaches to the ports with non-contact mines, triggered by a ship's magnetic field, which were difficult to detect and "sweep" using conventional methods.

=== 16/17 September 1940 ===
On the night of 16/17 September 1940, the Luftwaffe dropped 25 parachute mines on to London, causing widespread damage. Seventeen failed to explode and Sub-Lieutenant Moore and Lieutenant Commander Dick Ryan of the Royal Navy's Torpedo and Mining School at Portsmouth volunteered to deal with them. Though the first mine had been initially ticking it was silent when the two men arrived to examine it.

They were aware the bombs had self-destruction mechanism with a 22-second delay clock, but they could not tell if the clock had stopped or be sure of preventing it from restarting. If they heard the bomb start to tick they would have to run for cover. The operation to neutralise the first three mines was successfully completed and Ryan formed two teams, each manned by an officer and a petty officer, to deal with the remainder.

=== Dagenham 1940 ===
On the night of 20/21 September 1940, four parachute mines fell on Dagenham but only one exploded. Moore, working alongside Chief Petty Officer George Wheeler, examined one of the unexploded bombs with a very damaged fuse ring which could not be removed. Moore used a borrowed drill to drill either side of the fuse so it broke in half and could be extracted. He was removing the mine's magnetic trigger when Ryan arrived after disarming another mine.

Having satisfied himself that the mine which Moore was handling had been made safe, Ryan went to a warehouse some 200 yards away, to deal with the last mine. As he and his assistant entered the building the mine, which was hanging by its parachute, exploded, killing both men.

Moore was one of the first to be invested with the George Cross by King George VI at Buckingham Palace on 17 June 1941; Ryan and his assistant received posthumous George Crosses.

His citation, published in the London Gazette of 27 December 1940, noted his courage in tackling a damaged mine that had fallen on Dagenham, Essex, on 20 September 1940.

=== Later war career ===
Moore served with the mines counter-measures section at the Admiralty until appointed torpedo officer of the light cruiser HMS Dido in the Mediterranean in 1942.

He saw action in support of the Eighth Army in the coastal waters of North Africa and during Operation Vigorous, when Rear Admiral Sir Philip Vian tried to fight a relief convoy through to Malta.

After being involved in the Navy's support for the Allied landings in Sicily, Salerno and Anzio, Moore served as deputy director of Torpedoes and Mining on the Admiralty delegation in Washington, D.C. for the last year of the war.

== Post-war career ==
On leaving the Navy in 1946, Moore worked for the Atomic Energy Research Establishment at Harwell, where he was appointed maintenance manager of the research reactor Bepo. Soon he was drawing on his pre-war experience to conduct a study on whether a larger reactor could produce heat at cheaper prices.

With his service experience Moore was frequently chosen to be the public spokesman on atomic issues. When Georgi Malenkov, the Russian energy minister, was shown round the Calder Hall plant in 1956, it was Moore, by then chief design engineer, who assured the press that care had been taken not to tell him either the station's output or commercial value. After the construction of Calder Hall was completed, Moore became director of reactor design at the UK Atomic Energy Authority and managing director of the establishment's reactor group. As such, he was the driving force behind the advanced gas-cooled reactors, which have led to today's more efficient nuclear power.

In 1966, he toured the country giving his Faraday lecture "Nuclear Power Today and Tomorrow".

Dick Moore, who was appointed a Commander of the Order of the British Empire in 1963, died on 25 April 2003.

== Personal life ==
Moore married Ruby Edith Pair in 1944. She predeceased him with one of their three sons.
