= Kathleen Pettigrew =

British civil servant and member intelligence services

Kathleen Petigrew
- Born: 27 February 1898; Bermondsey, England
- Died: 6 July 1990 (aged 92)
- Occupation: British Intelligence Services
- Years active: 1916–1958

Kathleen Pettigrew (1898–1990) started as a secretary within the police and reached the most senior roles during her long career in the British Intelligence services during the First and Second World Wars. She is better known as inspiration for Miss Moneypenny in the James Bond novels and films.

== Biography ==
Pettigrew was born 27 February 1898 in Bermondsey in London to William and Ellen Pettigrew and had one surviving elder sister, Ellen. Her father had been in casual work as a sealskin dresser, but soon after she was born the family moved to Westminster and both her parents became proprietors of a chandler's shop. Her mother Ellen Pettigrew continued with the shop after her husband died in 1915.

Kathleen Pettigrew attended St Martin-in-the-Fields School for Girls until 1906. After training as a secretary from when she was 14, probably at Pitman Metropolitan School, Kathleen Pettigrew started work at 18 in 1916, in the London Metropolitan police Special Branch during the First World War. Her sister already worked as a registry clerk there. Kathleen Pettigrew produced transcripts of the interrogation of suspected German spies, including Mata Hari in addition to typing and filing confidential documents. In March 1917 she recorded the transcript of questioning a suspicious Russian man known as both Count de Borch and Anton Baumberg. He was subsequently killed by Douglas Malcolm because he was having an affair with his wife. Pettigrew was called as a witness at the coroner's inquest.

After the war ended, Pettigrew joined MI6 where she worked for 37 years to became the most senior secretary in the organisation, working with five of its chiefs. She accompanied at least one of them, Stewart Menzies at meetings with Winston Churchill. During the Second World War she was involved in message transmission within Bletchley Park as well as communication with overseas field agents. She was a key point in the flow of information to and from the head of MI6 and at times acted independently on his behalf.

Pettigrew was made OBE in 1958 when she retired as a Senior Chief Executive Officer in the Foreign Office, after being previously awarded an MBE in 1946. In retirement she lived in Sidmouth, Devon but was still sometimes called upon for her historical knowledge of MI6.

Her life-long appreciation of parakeets began when some were kept in a pub near her family home in Westminster. She died at the age of 92 on 6 July 1990 in hospital and was buried in Sidmouth Cemetery.
