= Nadine Benjamin =

British opera singer

Nadine Benjamin MBE
- Born: Nadine Rohanda Smith; Brixton, London, England
- Other names: Nadine Rohanda Smith Wray Willow Benjamin; Nadine Mortimer-Smith
- Education: St Martin-in-the-Fields High School for Girls
- Occupation: Opera singer

Nadine Rohanda Smith Wray Willow Benjamin MBE is a British lyric soprano singer.

She was born Nadine Rohanda Smith in Brixton, south London, of Jamaican-Indian heritage. Leaving St Martin-in-the-Fields High School for Girls when she was 16, she joined the Youth Training Scheme, which led to her working with a corporate finance company in the City for seven years. Realising that she wanted to be a singer, she attended Tech Music School in west London, before deciding to focus on opera.

Benjamin was the recipient of a Voice of Black Opera Award for the most promising voice, and subsequently set up a mentoring agency called Everybody Can!

She was appointed Member of the Order of the British Empire (MBE) in the 2021 Birthday Honours for services to opera.
