= Leonard Addison =

British Army officer and diplomat (1902–1975)

- Born: 27 September 1902; Woolwich, London
- Died: 30 May 1975 (aged 72) Chelsea, London
- Allegiance: United Kingdom
- Branch: British Army (British Raj) British Indian Army
- Service years: 1923–1948
- Rank: Brigadier
- Service number: 24359
- Conflicts: Second World War
- Awards: Companion of the Order of St Michael and St George, Commander of the Order of the British Empire, Mentioned in Dispatches

Brigadier Leonard Joseph Lancelot Addison CMG CBE (27 September 1902 – 30 May 1975) was a British Indian Army officer and diplomat.

== Early life and marriage ==
Addison was born in Woolwich, the son of Joseph Lancelot Addison and Harriet Jowett. He was educated at Strand School in Elm Park, followed by Ardingly College. In 1912, he moved to King's College School, and in January 1916, to Dulwich College. Leaving Dulwich College in December 1920 at the age of eighteen years, Addison entered the Royal Military College, Sandhurst as a Gentleman Cadet.

In 1927 he married Phyllis Mabel Coombs, the daughter of E.E. Coombs OBE. They had one son and one daughter.

== Career ==
On 1 February 1923 he was commissioned into the 1st Battalion, Queen's Own Royal West Kent Regiment. In June 1926 he was seconded to the Indian Army, and in July 1927 transferred to the Indian Army Service Corps. He served on the North West Frontier during the 1930-31 campaign. He was promoted Captain in 1932 and Major in 1939. He served in India during the Second World War, working as assistant director of Contracts at Army HQ in Simla before seeing action in the Burma Campaign, during which he was Mentioned in Dispatches. In May 1945, Addison was transferred to the Home Department of the Indian Government. In April 1946 he became Chief Director of Purchase at the Indian Department of Food, and in June 1947 he was invested as a Commander of the Order of the British Empire.

In 1947, he became a Counsellor at the British High Commission in Calcutta. In March 1948, Addison was promoted to honorary brigadier and retired from the army. Between 1949 and 1952 he was Deputy High Commissioner in India. He was invested as a Companion of the Order of St Michael and St George in June 1952.
