= Leonard Dawe =

English footballer (1889–1963)

Personal information
- Full name: Leonard Sydney Dawe
- Date of birth: 3 November 1889
- Place of birth: Brentford, England
- Date of death: 12 January 1963 (aged 73)
- Place of death: Acton, London, England
- Position: Centre-forward

Senior career*
Years	Team	Apps	(Gls)
- Gosport United
- Dulwich Hamlet
1912	Cambridge University		
1912–1913	Southampton	11	(3)
1913–1915	Ilford		

International career
1912	England amateur	1	(0)
- * Club domestic league appearances and goals

Leonard Sydney Dawe (3 November 1889 – 12 January 1963) was an English amateur footballer who played in the Southern League for Southampton between 1912 and 1913, and made one appearance for the England national amateur football team in 1912. He later became a schoolteacher and crossword compiler for The Daily Telegraph newspaper and in 1944 was interrogated on suspicion of espionage in the run-up to the D-Day landings.

== Early career ==
Dawe was born in Brentford in west London and was educated at Portsmouth Grammar School, before going up to Emmanuel College at the University of Cambridge. In his final year at the university, he earned his football "blue" when he played in the 1912 match against the University of Oxford, scoring in his side's 3–1 victory.

== Football career ==
In March 1912, he signed on amateur terms for Southampton of the Southern League, making his debut in a 1–0 victory over Plymouth Argyle on 30 March. On his debut, he laid on the game's only goal for Percy Prince. The local daily paper, The Echo, reported that "Dawe was decidedly plucky to 'get in it'." Dawe always took the field wearing spectacles and one of his lenses was broken during his debut game.

Dawe continued to make occasional appearances for Southampton over the next twelve months, although his studies and teaching career prevented him from appearing more often. In his eleven league appearances for the "Saints", he scored three goals, including two against Watford on 13 April 1912.

Dawe was a member of the Great Britain squad for the 1912 Summer Olympics in Stockholm, Sweden, but was not selected to play. He did, however, make one appearance for the England national amateur football team when he played against Ireland in Belfast in October 1912.

By the end of the 1912–13 season, Dawe had severed his connection with Southampton and had joined Ilford in north-east London.

== Teaching career ==
In 1913, Dawe obtained a teaching position (teaching science) at Forest School in the Walthamstow area of north-east London before joining St Paul's School based at Barnes. In 1926, he joined Strand School in the Tulse Hill area of south London, progressing to become the school's head teacher. Dawe was described as a "disciplinarian and a man of extremely high principle". At Strand School, he was known as "'moneybags", in allusion to his initials, L.S.D. (pounds, shillings and pence).

== Military career ==
During World War I, Dawe was commissioned as a second lieutenant for service with the Forest School Officer Training Corps on 20 February 1915, transferring to the Hampshire Regiment "local reserve" on 9 May 1916. Whilst with the Hampshire Regiment, he served in the Mesopotamia campaign from September 1917.

After the war, he transferred as a lieutenant from a service battalion of the Hampshires to St Paul's School OTC on 29 April 1920, being promoted to major with St Paul's OTC on 25 August 1926, but resigned that commission on 16 October 1926.

== Crossword compiler ==
In 1925, he commenced compiling crosswords for The Daily Telegraph newspaper and was one of the first compilers to use "cryptic" clues. The first Daily Telegraph crossword, compiled by Dawe, appeared on 30 July 1925 – he continued to compile crosswords until his death in 1963.

During the Second World War Strand School was evacuated to Effingham, Surrey. Dawe was living at Leatherhead in 1944.

== The Dieppe and D-Day crosswords ==
Just two days before the ill-fated Dieppe raid in August 1942, the clue "French port (6)" appeared in the Daily Telegraph crossword (compiled by Dawe), whose solution, Dieppe, was revealed the next day; the landing took place on 19 August. The raid ended in a major failure, with thousands of Allied casualties. The War Office presumed that the crossword had been used to pass intelligence to the enemy, but all the suspicions were eventually dismissed as a coincidence.

In 1944, several codenames related to the D-Day plans, such as "Utah" and "Mulberry", appeared as solutions in Dawe's crosswords in The Daily Telegraph. The inclusion of the codewords was initially suspected by the British Secret Services to be a form of espionage, but it was determined that Dawe had got the words from boys at the school, who had overheard them from soldiers.

== "Quest" ==
In 1992, Dawe's life was the basis for an album, Quest, by the neo-prog band Final Conflict. The album is about an ordinary man like Dawe imagining he is on trial for the failings in his life.
