= Tammy Hensrud =

American opera singer

Tammy Hensrud is an American opera singer and teacher credited with hundreds of international performances. She is an adjunct Professor of Voice at Hofstra University.

She portrayed many trouser roles from Mozart's Cherubino and Sesto, to Strauss' Octavian and Composer, as well as the Rossini heroines of Rosina, Cenerentola and Isabella. She made her European debut in Klagenfurt as Romeo in Bellini's I Capuleti e I Montecchi while still in the Vienna State Opera's Young Artist Program. Following a career with more than 35 roles in the mezzo-soprano repertoire, Hensrud embarked on a career as a soprano performing roles such as Amelia, Lady Macbeth, Senta, Chrysothemis, and Vanessa along with such roles as Donna Elvira, Tosca and Lisa. As a soprano, Hensrud has appeared in opera houses throughout Europe and the US including the Vienna State Opera, Stuttgart Opera, Théâtre du Châtelet in Paris, Klagenfurt Stadttheater, the Salzburg Summer and Easter Festivals, the Metropolitan Opera, Cleveland Opera, Opera Orchestra of New York, and Liederkranz Opera.

Since 2008 Hensrud has also performed with soprano Korliss Uecker as the vocal duo "Feminine Musique". The duo specialises in performing works by women composers and have presented lecture recitals at conferences and festivals in the US and internationally.
