= Final Conflict (band) =

British neo-prog band

- Origin: England, Stoke-on-Trent, England
- Genres: Progressive rock, neo-prog
- Years active: 1985–present
- Label: Metal Mind Productions
- Members: Andy Lawton; Brian Donkin; Steve Lipiec; Barry Elwood
- Website: www.fc-music.com

Final Conflict are a British neo-prog band based in Staffordshire.

== Band members ==
Current line-up (as of November 2015)

- Brian Donkin – Vocals, guitars
- Andy Lawton – Vocals, guitars
- Steve Lipiec – Keyboards, saxophone, backing vocals
- Barry Elwood – Bass, guitars, backing vocals

== History ==
Final Conflict were formed in 1985, by Andy Lawton and Brian Donkin. After the release of two cassette albums the band was signed by Gaia Records and the band's first CD album Redress the Balance (1991) was released, based around an ecological theme and featuring a number of guest musicians.

The band's second album, Quest (1992), was inspired by crossword compiler Leonard Dawe, who in 1944 inadvertently leaked code words from Operation Overlord in a crossword for The Daily Telegraph newspaper. The album is about an ordinary man like Dawe imagining he is on trial for the failings in his life.

The third album, Stand Up, delayed by the withdrawal of funding by the band's original record label, finally appeared in 1997. Again the album was based on a loose concept, this time the stresses of modern living, culminating in the 15-minute epic, "Stop", about urban decay and the rise of violent crime.

The band released a fourth album, Hindsight, in 2003. This album benefited from advances in recording technology, which allowed the band to produce a professional quality recording in its own Gaolhouse recording studio.

Their fifth album, Simple was released in 2006. Recorded to celebrate 21 years of involvement in music, the album comprised new recordings of songs from their early cassette albums and the first two CD albums, along with new material.

Final Conflict's success was acknowledged in 2007, when they were nominated in 5 categories at The Classic Rock Society's Band of the Year awards. They were voted second best band and Henry Rogers was second best drummer. In 2008, at the same awards, they were presented with the MD's award by Steve Hackett of Genesis.

February 2009 saw the release of Final Conflict's first live DVD and CD. They are grateful to Metal Mind Productions for providing them with this fantastic opportunity. The DVD & CD are entitled "Another Moment in Time". Metal Mind also released a special limited edition remaster of the band's classic album "Stand Up" which includes previously unreleased bonus tracks.

In December 2012 the band released their sixth studio album "Return of the Artisan", to extensive critical acclaim. Return of the Artisan is the first part of the Artisan trilogy.

The band released part two of the Artisan trilogy "The Rise of the Artisan" in 2020, along with a fully remastered version of Return of the Artisan.

The band are currently working on the third and final album of the Artisan trilogy, provisionally entitled "The Artisan Legacy".
