= Ronald Gurner =

Stanley Ronald Kershaw Gurner M.C. M.A. (1890–1939) was a headmaster and writer who was born in London.

== Early years ==
Educated at Merchant Taylors' School, London, Gurner went to Oxford University, where he was a classics scholar at St. Johns. He gained a First in honour moderations and won a university Latin prize. After illness in his final year he was awarded an aegrotat degree.

He took up part-time teaching positions at Haileybury College in 1912, before moving to Clifton College in 1913, and to a permanent post at Marlborough College in September 1913. In 1914 he was commissioned into the Rifle Brigade and served two years in the trenches before being wounded at Arras (where he won the Military Cross) in 1917 by a sniper.

== Headships ==
He became Headmaster of Strand School in Brixton in 1920, at the age of thirty, and was appointed Headmaster of King Edward VII School in Sheffield) in spring 1926.

In the summer of 1927, he resigned to take up the vacant Headship at Whitgift School in Croydon.

== Writings ==
He published poems (including war poems) and several novels. These include:

- "Pass Guard at Ypres", a thinly disguised autobiography of his time as a junior officer in the Salient;
- "The Riven Pall", about a working class scholarship boy in a northern steel city called "Orechester", who went to a high-performing day school, then to Oxford, and ultimately gained success by inventing a new process that benefited the local steel and engineering industry;
- "The Day Boy" based on Strand School;
- "For the Sons of Gentlemen" (written under the pseudonym of Kerr-Shaw);
- "Reconstruction" published in 1933 by Dent, London.
- "We Crucify!" published in 1939 by Dent, London. Cited by Dorothy L. Sayers in her Introduction to The Man Born to Be King for "its imaginative treatment of the whole situation from the point of view of the Sanhedrin."
