= Reading, Jamaica =

Reading
- Town
- Location within Jamaica
- Coordinates: 18.439°N 77.943°W
- Country: Jamaica
- Parish: Saint James
- Time zone: UTC-5 (EST)

Reading is a small town in the parish of Saint James in northwestern Jamaica. It is located West of Montego Bay.
