= Tulse Hill School =

Location
- Upper Tulse Hill; London, Lambeth; England; 51°26′44″N 0°06′58″W

Information
- Motto: Ad unum omnes (All to a man)
- Established: 1956
- Closed: 1990
- Gender: Boys
- Age: 11 to 18
- Enrolment: c.2000
- Houses: Originally 8, later replaced by year group pastoral units
- Colours: Blue and white

Tulse Hill School was a large comprehensive school for boys in Upper Tulse Hill, in the London Borough of Lambeth, England. The school building had eight floors and served almost two thousand pupils. It opened in 1956 and closed in 1990. Notable alumni include Ken Livingstone, the former London Mayor, and poet Linton Kwesi Johnson.

== History ==
The school was opened on 11 September 1956 under the headmastership of Clifford Thomas. Student management was originally based on public school lines employing a house system, and having prefects (both school and house). Originally, there were upper and lower schools, and within the sixth forms upper and lower sixth, with the lower sixth being called the remove, similar to its close neighbour Dulwich College.

In 1972, students of the school had multiple conflicts with a local gay commune on Althone Road, occupied by members of the Gay Liberation Front. The conflicts culminated in the residents leafletting the school with the slogan "We are here and we're staying. We are not taking no more shit."

Later, the school moved away from a house system, replacing it with pastoral group units. The school operated this system until its closure in 1990. Changing population figures for the area have been given as the reason for closure. In 1988, an ILEA (Inner London Education Authority) quadrant review proposed a merger between this school and one in the neighbouring borough of Southwark, William Penn Boys. However the two boroughs failed to agree on a combined school, and the demise of ILEA as a supervisory body in 1990 made this no longer enforceable.

== Education ==
Originally, the school had a broad curriculum providing for the normal grammar school academic courses, including Latin, Greek, French, physics, chemistry, biology and other general subjects. These subjects were taken to the advanced level (A-level) of the General Certificate of Education examination.

Tulse Hill School was the first secondary school in the 1980s to offer an examinable CSE course in Black History. It was a Mode 2 CSE course examined by the Middlesex Board, and which later became the London Regional Examining Board. Boys in the fifth form could opt to do Black History after taking either a standard History CSE or GCE early in the autumn and spend the rest of the year following this specialist course and examination. The initiative was partly funded by a donation by Muhammad Ali who had visited the school and inspired Nigel File as Head of History to initiate a Black History Month and with his team to create a cutting edge curriculum. This was done using a book jointly authored by Nigel File and Chris Power, "Black Settlers in Britain 1555-1958" and which became a Heinemann publication. There is a dedication to Tulse Hill by Nigel and Chris who were both on the school's staff on its fly-leaf first page. The early student copies (from 1981) even offered teachers a methodology for teaching Black History! These early copies are much sought after on the second-hand book market and fetch prices today in excess of £60!

Ali sparred with one of the students during his visit. The last Lonsdale belt was awarded in 1986. The curriculum was also shared later with some local Lambeth secondary schools with whom it had formed a sixth form consortium.

In 1988, Tulse Hill School became one of the first London Boys' Schools to acquire a Domestic Science classroom and teacher. A workshop was converted at a cost of £50,000 to support equality of opportunity. Boys did a carousel of textile studies, cookery and parenthood skills. It also installed a second computer room to support better ICT skills.

Another initiative was to fund an "up and coming" South London athlete called Linford Christie to act as a part-time occasional mentor to its senior sports students. The sixth form tertiary board voted positively to give him a £500 grant with ILEA approval. Linford went on to be a highly distinguished UK Olympian.

In 1989 it created an Australian style "mini-school" where staff taught several subjects to first form pupils having moved from a house system to a year system. In a two-year period the roll of the school shrank from 1,100 boys to 337 who then transferred to adjacent Dick Sheppard School under a planned closure. Technically it had become an annex of Dick Sheppard School in its last year.

After Tulse Hill school closed, for five years a committee of former staff and governors administered a £20,000 Charifund investment with the Stock Exchange belonging to the schools' trustees. The trust tracked former students into further or higher education. It offered them sizable grants of several hundred pounds towards books, travel, or study fees until the trust funds had been depleted.

Throughout the school's three decades, specialist facilities in the school prepared students in engineering, building, art, music, and commercial subjects to prepare them for a variety of professions. Pupils were also prepared for student and craft apprenticeships.

== Catchment ==
The school attendance drew from South London suburbs, including Streatham, Brixton, Herne Hill, Clapham and Brockwell Park.

== School badge and motto ==
The Tulse Hill School Badge

The school badge depicts a paschal lamb supporting a cross, set above a strip (wreath) of alternating blue and white. Below that is a shield Argent two bars wavy azure. The top half of the emblem is borrowed from the crest of the London Borough of Lambeth in which the school was situated. The only difference being that the Lambeth crest has a Pennon flowing from the cross, whereas Tulse Hill School's emblem has no pennon. The shield is the bottom half of London County Council's arms.

The blue and white waves lines represent the River Thames; the paschal lamb with cross in heraldic terms is a "canting" or punning reference to the name Lambeth.

The Latin motto Ad unum omnes was employed meaning All for One; One for All.

== Uniform ==
Thomas's of Herne Hill and Clapham South, and later Temples' of Brixton and Streatham, tailored the uniforms for students. The school badge could then be sewn onto the blazer. Mr Thomas was thought to dislike the image, as he claimed it looked more like a wolf than a lamb.

In the 1960s, the 6th form tie was dark blue decorated with multiple images of the school emblem and the upper school tie was royal blue with diagonal stripes, the stripes being dark blue with a white centre. One striking feature of the early years of Tulse Hill School uniform was the house colours displayed on school caps. When the school first opened, the boys had to wear a black school cap with the school badge on the front section and the house denoted by a coloured button at the apex of the cap. In later years (c.1958), the cap was redesigned with the rear section in one of eight house colours.

All students were expected to wear the school uniform with the exception of sixth formers were allowed "modest discretion". House prefects were distinguished by small oak leaves sewn under the school badge. School prefects had large oak leaves. In the late 1950s, school prefects also wore a short gilet-style gown with blue facings around the school. This gown was worn by school prefects until at least 1966.

== Houses ==
Games and social activities were originally organized on a house system. Boys were allocated a house and being guided by a housemaster. It was the housemasters' job to get to know their individual house members, and there were often house meetings after morning assembly. Inter-house sporting fixtures were another feature of school life, together with house outings and social activities. The house system at Tulse Hill was eventually replaced by pastoral group units.

The eight school houses were named after men who had associations with the borough of Lambeth. At the time that the house system was abandoned, there were only five houses with Wren, Temple, and Faraday having been retired some years earlier.

Houses of Tulse Hill School
House	Founded	Colours	Named after
Blake	1956	Light blue	William Blake, poet
Brunel	1956	Pink (later dark blue after Faraday was retired)	Isambard Kingdom Brunel, engineer
Dickens	1956	Green	Charles Dickens, author
Faraday	1956	Black until about 1959, then dark blue	Michael Faraday, scientist
Temple	1956	Yellow	William Temple, Archbishop of Canterbury
Turner	1956	Maroon	J. M. W. Turner, landscape artist
Webb	1956	Grey (later yellow after Temple was retired)	Matthew Webb the first to swim the English Channel. A painting depicting this hung in the school hall.
Wren	1956	Brown (1956–79)	Christopher Wren, architect

== Cadet forces ==
Unlike most comprehensive schools, Tulse Hill established detachments of the Army Cadet Force and the Air Training Corps. The Cadet Corps had regular weekend training and annual camps away from the school grounds. Initially, there was no designated site for the cadets on school grounds, but a permanent building was erected at the end of the cycle sheds in 1962 with each unit occupying half.

The Army Cadet Force unit was established as 23 (City of London) Company, affiliated to the Royal Fusiliers. After 1968, this changed to 74 Company South East London ACF and the regimental affiliation was changed to the Royal Regiment of Fusiliers. The first Officer Commanding was Captain A J "Jerry" Hall who was also a German language teacher in the school.

== Buildings and grounds ==
The buildings were large enough to accommodate the over 2,000 students that attended. The main building was a large glass-clad building with eight floors, served by four lifts. Until the late 1970s a lift operator would press the desired floor button for the students. In an attached annex was the administration block, the kitchens, the staff room, and the Great Hall. Morning assembly was held in the hall which had a professional stage lighting system by Strand Electric. Adjacent to the hall were a number of music rooms equipped with various instruments.

The hall also housed an organ previously belonging to the Rose Hill Gaumont Cinema. It was a two-manual Compton which had drums, cymbals and whistles removed before re-installation. It played songs such as "Trumpet Voluntary" and the school song. It was believed that cracks in the building were caused by the organ.

In addition to the main educational building there was a gymnasium block, containing six gymnasia, and a workshop block where woodwork, engineering and building trades were taught.

The main building suffered from serious structural subsidence in the 1980s and wooden props were installed at the Great Hall end to stabilise the structure.

The buildings were demolished in the early 1990s. Following demolition, the site was bought by a housing association and homes for 160 people have since been built on the site. The estate is infamous as the home of Jean Charles de Menezes and part of the reason he was misidentified by police before they shot him. The empty school buildings prior to demolition can be seen in the first filming of Helen Mirren's 1990 detective series written by Linda La Plante. As the Lambeth and the London Residuary Body gave permission for it to be used as a film location.

In 1997, the school entrance and the caretaker's cottage remained on site. House builders on site said that the school building basement (plant) level remained, as it had simply been "filled" in. After the school had been demolished in the 1990s, excavations revealed an early Saxon settlement which included eight sunken-floored buildings.

=== Sporting facilities ===
Sport was seen as an important component of school life from the beginning despite the lack of space for field sports. The school had six gymnasia, extensive paved grounds, coach transport to Priest Hill Playing Fields at Ewell, and use of a boathouse at Putney. An on-site swimming pool was proposed in the early 1960s but the headmaster devoted fundraising efforts towards the purchase of the school organ. For a time in the 1960s, the school used the National Sports Centre at Crystal Palace for swimming and also held sports days there. Herne Hill cycling stadium was also used for sports days. Sports included football, cricket, hockey, tennis, field sports, rugby union, athletics and fencing.

== Off-site activities ==
Tulse Hill School made a commitment to off-site activities. School trips around the UK were common and there were other trips to various parts of Europe, the Caribbean, and the United States. Chief sites were Priest Hill Sports Grounds at Ewell, The Croft at Etchingham and Davos in Switzerland.

=== The Croft ===
The Croft was Tulse Hill School's study centre situated in the village of Etchingham in Sussex. It was a former hotel, converted in 1971 for the school's use and stood in 14 acres (5.7 ha) of its own grounds. Every Monday a party of up to 30 boys with one or more teachers would leave the school to spend up to five days at the Croft on specially designed study courses. Activities for first-year students included visits to Bodiam Castle and Hastings, visits to farms and route-finding exercises using the Croft's own resources, which included an assault course. Cycling enthusiasts at the school would bike the 50 miles (80 km) to the Croft and back some weekends. The Croft continues in operation as a Lambeth Council initiative.

=== Trips abroad ===
Tulse Hill School sent pupils to a number of foreign locations for sporting, educational, recreational and cultural activities. The school sent a cricket team to Jamaica (where they lost every game of cricket but won every game of football played as an unofficial addition to the trip), and a rugby XV to the United States. The school's version of The Tempest, adapted as a Caribbean musical, was selected to represent Britain at an international youth arts festival in Berlin.

Other locations included Germany, the Netherlands, Italy, France, Norway and Belgium.

=== St Matthew's off-site unit ===
In the early 1980s the school set up its St Matthew's off-site unit in the crypt of St Matthew's church in central Brixton. Students over 14 years of age who found the large 'Titan' school premises challenging or needed particular support were given a part-time or full-time curriculum there combined with work experience with local companies so that they could obtain vocational qualifications. The school was a "pilot school" for the Certificate of Pre-Vocational Education or CPVE which was a portfolio and practically based precursor of BTEC.

== Alumni ==
- Michael Alldis 1979/82 - boxer, former British & Commonwealth champion
- Dennis Bailey – footballer, played for Queens Park Rangers (New Year's Day 1992 hat-trick vs. Manchester United)
- Jairus Banaji - Marxist historian and writer
- Les Briley – footballer (midfield/striker)
- Steve Bucknall – basketball player, played in the NBA and captain of the English team
- Nick Chatterton – footballer, Crystal Palace and Millwall
- Kenneth Cranham – actor
- David Emmanuel a.k.a. Smiley Culture – musician, UK-based reggae artist
- Linton Kwesi Johnson – the world's first reggae poet
- Ken Livingstone – Mayor of London 2000–2008, and politician
- Sir Nicholas John Patten – Justice of Appeal
- Donovan Reid – former British sprinter, 1984 Olympics
- Noel 'Razor' Smith - writer and former criminal
- Danny Williams – boxer and former Commonwealth Heavyweight champion

== Former teachers ==
- Ken Morley – actor
- Douglas Fielding – actor (Z-Cars) – pupil
- Mike Edwards - Head of Economics (ex-deputy head and head of sixth form) – played cricket for Surrey between 1961 and 1974. Mike played twice for England in the West Indies. On his retirement in 1990, he went on to be the main cricketing coach for Surrey based at the Oval. He mentored several future England players and was interviewed by The Guardian newspaper in a valedictory sports profile before he finally retired from his Surrey post.
- Donald Hinds - Jamaican-born writer and educator
- Philip Hobsbaum – poet and critic
- Richard Edmonds - neo-Nazi political activist
- Paul Stephenson - civil rights activist and former governor of the school
- Headteachers:
  - Clifford Thomas
  - Raymond Long
  - Brian Evans
  - Ken Noble
  - Sa'ad Khaldi
  - Tom Wilson and Mike Edwards - jointly
