= Richard Ryan (Royal Navy officer) =

Recipient of the George Cross (1903–1940)

Richard John Hammersley Ryan
- Born: 23 July 1903; Rotherham, England
- Died: 21 September 1940 (aged 37); Dagenham, England
- Burial place: Haslar Royal Naval Cemetery
- Military career
- Allegiance: United Kingdom
- Branch: Royal Navy
- Service years: 1922–1940
- Rank: Lieutenant-Commander
- Unit: HMS Vernon
- Conflicts: Second World War: Home Front; The Blitz †
- Awards: George Cross

Lieutenant-Commander Richard John Hammersley Ryan, GC (23 July 1903 – 21 September 1940) was a Royal Navy officer who was posthumously awarded the George Cross along with Chief Petty Officer Reginald Vincent Ellingworth for the "great gallantry and undaunted devotion to duty" they displayed while attempting to defuse a mine which had fallen on Dagenham in Essex on 21 September 1940.

== Early life and career ==
Ryan was from a naval family, the son of Admiral Frank Edward Cavendish Ryan. He joined the Royal Navy in the early 1920s, was promoted to lieutenant in 1925, and lieutenant commander on 1 August 1933.

== Second World War ==
The pair had defused many such devices together, and had just successfully defused a device in Hornchurch which was threatening an aerodrome and explosives factory when they were called to Dagenham. The bomb there was hanging from its parachute on a warehouse.

Notice of the award appeared in the London Gazette of 20 December 1940:

Chief Petty Officer Reginald Vincent Ellingworth worked as an assistant to Lieutenant Commander R. J. H. Ryan in rendering safe magnetic mines. They worked together on many assignments sharing equally the dangers involved. The principal hazard of these mines was that the clock of the bomb fuse was normally timed to explode the mine about 22 seconds after it had landed. If the fuse failed to explode, the clock could be restarted by the slightest movement, even a footfall. The amount that the clock fuse had already run could never be known, and once it had re-started the time to escape could not be more than a few seconds. At Dagenham Essex the two officers tackled such a mine hanging by a parachute in a warehouse and were both killed by its explosion. Chief Petty Officer Ellingworth had previously been commended by the Captain of H.M.S VERNON for his work on mine disposal.
