= St Martin-in-the-Fields High School for Girls =

Location
- 155 Tulse Hill; London, SW2 3UP; England; 51°26′38″N 0°06′36″W

Information
- Type: Academy
- Motto: Caritate et disciplina (With Love and Learning)
- Religious affiliation: Church of England
- Established: 1699; 327 years ago
- Founder: Parish of St Martin-in-the-Fields
- Closed: August 2024
- Department for Education URN: 137966 Tables
- Ofsted: Reports
- Chair of Governors: Alicia Walker
- Headteacher: Josephine Okokon
- Staff: 50+
- Gender: Girls (coeducational 6th form)
- Age: 11 to 18
- Enrolment: c. 400 (2022–23)
- Colours: Blue and Grey
- Website: http://www.stmartins.academy/

St Martin-in-the-Fields High School for Girls was one of the oldest schools for girls in Britain. It was established in 1699 as a charitable enterprise by the parish of St Martin-in-the-Fields. Its popularity and growth led to its relocation in 1928 on a larger site in Tulse Hill, in the South London borough of Lambeth, England. For most of its history it was a grammar school, but at its closure in 2024 it was a secondary school with academy status.

The school badge depicts the eponymous St. Martin of Tours. The school motto, Caritate et disciplina translates as "With Love and Learning". The school remained Christian but accepted girls of all faiths.

Following the school's closure because of declining enrolment, it was announced that the building would become a youth hub called Oasis St Martin's Village.

== History ==
The school was founded by the parish of St Martin-in-the-Fields in 1699 as a charity. Those who ran the parish at the time, and the Society for Promoting Christian Knowledge, were considered radical for their notion that there should be a local school for girls as well as boys.

The school was originally in Charing Cross Road, near the St. Martin-in-the-Fields church in Trafalgar Square. It was known as St Martin's Middle Class School for Girls, and only later became known as St Martin-in-the-Fields High School for Girls. Parish endowments thus made possible the education of girls. The school did well and grew, in what was a populous fast-growing parish. By the early twentieth century growth was such that a bigger building with proper grounds and playing fields became necessary. The school relocated to its present site in Tulse Hill in 1928. The nearby Strand School had moved to the same area fifteen years earlier for similar reasons. St Martins' new buildings were officially opened by the then Duchess of York, wife of the future King George VI, better known in later decades as the Queen Mother.

In 1999, Queen Elizabeth II took part in the school celebrations of its tercentenary.

St Martin's was given technology college status in 1996. The school was awarded a Sportsmark and was identified as an Ambassador School for Gifted and Talented Youth. It had a long-standing exchange link with Anchovy High School in Anchovy, near Montego Bay, Jamaica.

In the 21st century, an estimated 36% of children in St Martin's catchment area received free school meals, and a high percentage were from lone-parent families. Almost 90% of the school's pupils were of Caribbean or African extraction, with an estimated 27% speaking English as an additional language.

The school announced in May 2023 that because of declining enrolment amid a low birth rate in London, it would close at the end of the 2023–24 school year. In July 2024, it was announced that the site would become a youth hub called Oasis St Martin's Village, run by Oasis Charitable Trust.

== Performance ==
Despite a low turnout during 2011–13, St Martins' was in the top 5% of similar schools in England. Its results and level of achievement had recently declined. St Martin's had in recent years won the Lambeth Debating competition four times in a row.

== Notable former pupils ==
- Carol Barnes, broadcaster
- Gloria Craig CB, from 2007 to 2011 Director of International Security Policy at the Ministry of Defence
- Kathleen Pettigrew OBE (1898 - 1990), worked in MI6 during Second World War and after for 37 years
- Monica Pidgeon, interior designer and writer
- Skin, singer–songwriter
- Lynn Trickett, graphic designer, co-founder of the Trickett & Webb advertising agency
- Kristal Awuah, sprinter

== See also ==
- List of the oldest schools in the United Kingdom
