= Korliss Uecker =

American operatic soprano

- Born: April 28; Hettinger, North Dakota
- Occupation: Opera singer (soprano)
- Website: korlissuecker.com

Korliss Uecker (born April 28, is an American operatic soprano from Hettinger, North Dakota. With a Masters of Music from the Juilliard School, she performed over 100 times at the Metropolitan Opera singing roles such as Susanna in Le nozze di Figaro and Papagena in The Magic Flute. She has also appeared with Washington National Opera at the Kennedy Center, Dallas Opera, Santa Fe Opera and the Spoleto Festival, among others. In addition to opera, Uecker sings a wide variety of vocal music including lieder, French chansons, cabaret, jazz and American musical theatre.

== Early life ==
Korliss Uecker was born and raised in Hettinger, North Dakota. Her father Charles was a veterinarian and her mother Edna, a housewife and writer. She grew up with two siblings, Jonathan and Sherida.

Uecker studied singing in high school and then studied science and music at the University of North Dakota, where she graduated with both a Bachelor of Science and Bachelor of Arts. During college at UND she also sang professionally in a jazz band named Blue Skies, which helped finance her undergraduate studies. After undergraduate work, Uecker was accepted at the Juilliard School in 1983. In the summer of 1984 she attended the Music Academy of the West conservatory program. She was a member of the Juilliard Opera Center and earned her Master of Music degree in 1990. She worked as a registered nurse while she attended Juilliard, chiefly in the medical surgical unit and in orthopedics at New York Presbyterian Hospital.

== Music career ==
After graduating from Juilliard in 1990, she worked for two summers as an apprentice with Santa Fe Opera, and in November 1991 made her debut with the Metropolitan Opera as Gianetta in L'elisir d'amore with Luciano Pavarotti.
