= Tulse Hill =

Area in London, England

Coordinates: 51.4452°N 0.1091°W

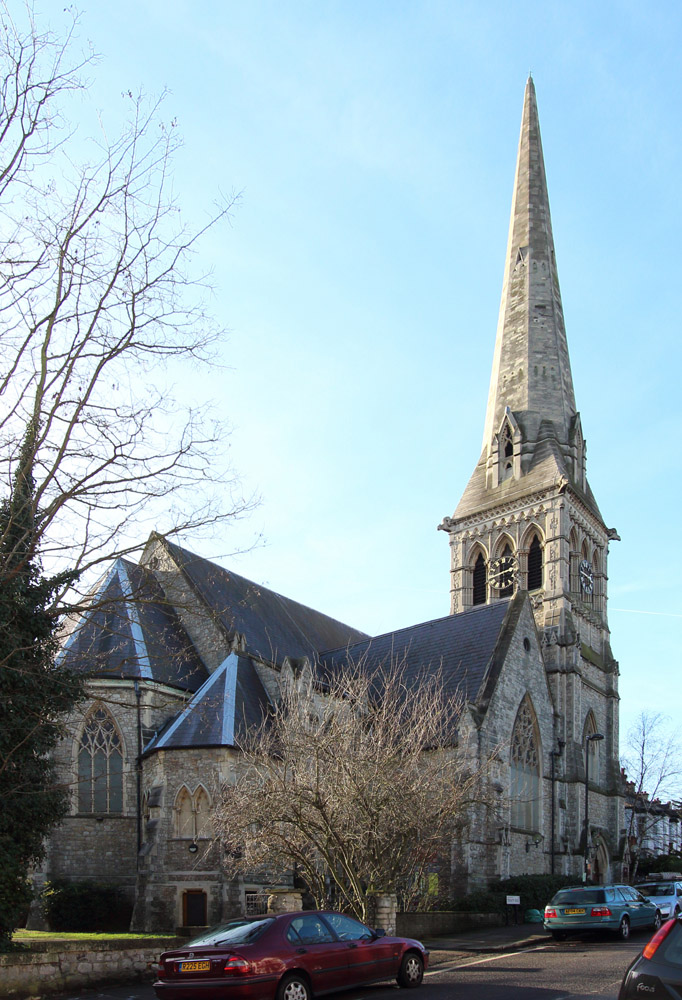
- Holy Trinity Church, Tulse Hill (built 1855–6)

- Location within Greater London
- OS grid reference: TQ315735
- London borough: Lambeth
- Ceremonial county: Greater London
- Region: London
- Country: England
- Sovereign state: United Kingdom
- Post town: LONDON
- Postcode district: SW2
- Postcode district: SE21, SE24, SE27
- Dialling code: 020
- Police: Metropolitan
- Fire: London
- Ambulance: London
- UK Parliament: Dulwich and West Norwood; Clapham & Brixton Hill
- London Assembly: Lambeth and Southwark

Tulse Hill is a district in the London Borough of Lambeth in South London that sits on Brockwell Park. It is approximately five miles (8 km) from Charing Cross and is bordered by Brixton, Dulwich, Herne Hill, Streatham and West Norwood.

== History ==
The area known as Tulse Hill is part of the former Manor or Manors of Bodley, Upgroves and Scarlettes whose precise boundaries are now uncertain. The name of the area comes from the Tulse family who came into ownership of farmland in the area during the period of the Commonwealth in the 1650s. Sir Henry Tulse was Lord Mayor of London in 1683 and his daughter Elizabeth married Richard Onslow, 1st Baron Onslow. The land remained in Onslow ownership until 1789 when most of it was purchased by William Cole. The estate was further divided on Cole's death in 1807.

The western part was left to "Mercy Cressingham, spinster" (now commemorated by the Cressingham Gardens estate in the area) and the eastern part -now mostly occupied by Brockwell Park - was left to Richard Ogbourne who promptly sold it on to John Blades.

In 1810 Tulse Hill Farm was the only building in the western part of the area. The enclosure of land in the parish of Lambeth in 1811 led to the construction of Effra Road in the area immediately to the north. Together with improvements to Brixton Road by the local turnpike trust this greatly improved road communications with central London, and the value of the local landholdings.

Mercy Cressingham eventually married Dr Thomas Edwards, who took the initiative in buying extra land to make an access from Brixton Hill in 1814 and laying out two new roads, Lower Tulse Hill Road (now known simply as Tulse Hill) and Upper Tulse Hill Road (now Upper Tulse Hill), by 1821. A plan of 1821 in the RIBA Library shows a proposed speculative development of both the Edwards estate and the adjacent Blades estate with large detached villas, although only the former actually came to fruition. The new roads were adopted by the parish in 1822.

An 1832 map shows that Tulse Hill still had only a few buildings on the new roads in contrast to nearby recently developed areas in Brixton and Norwood and the longer established hamlet of Dulwich. However, by 1843, there was a continuous line of houses, predominantly detached and usually with separate coach houses along the full length of Lower Tulse Hill Road from Brixton to the top of the hill.

Development of the area to the east of this road commenced in 1845 when Trinity Rise was built to connect Upper Tulse Hill with Norwood Road. Holy Trinity Church on Trinity Rise was built in 1855-6 and is now grade II listed.

Major development of the area further east did not come until the opening of the Herne Hill and Tulse Hill railway stations in the 1860s.

Most of the original villas with large gardens on the original Edwards-Cressingham landholding have been redeveloped at much higher densities for council housing since the 1930s.

The most prominent survival of 19th century Tulse Hill is Berry House, later called Silwood Hall, and now forming the front part of St Martin-In-The-Fields High School for Girls, a Church of England secondary school which outlasted the nearby 1950s schools before its closure in 2024.

The redevelopment of Tulse Hill after World War II by the London County Council had included the construction of two large secondary schools - Tulse Hill School and Dick Sheppard School (originally for girls only). Both schools have now closed, and their sites have been redeveloped for housing of very contrasting types. The Dick Sheppard School site was redeveloped as Brockwell Gate, a gated Regency style with houses and apartments overlooking Brockwell Park. The site of Tulse Hill school was redeveloped as affordable housing.

== Politics ==
Tulse Hill is represented on the Lambeth London Borough Council by councillors for the Brixton Rush Common, St Martin's, and West Dulwich wards. All three wards are held by the Labour Party although the ward now known as West Dulwich was historically a Conservative ward until the 2014 Lambeth London Borough Council election. Tulse Hill is represented in the London Assembly by Marina Ahmad and in Westminster by Helen Hayes and Bell Ribeiro-Addy.

In March 2022 Lambeth Council initiated a consultation with residents as to renaming the area, to avoid a possible association with Henry Tulse who was once a board member of the Royal African Company, a slave-trading concern in the seventeenth century.

== Transport ==
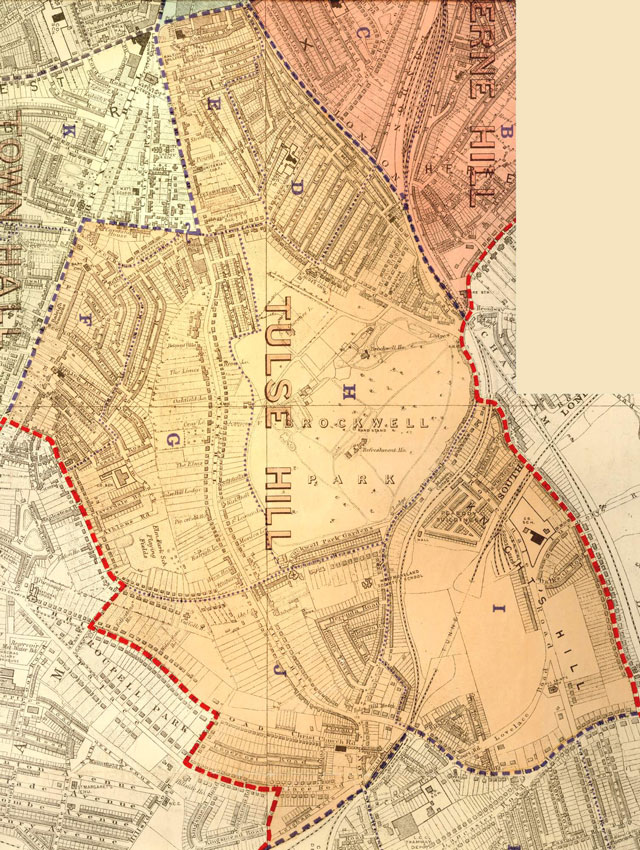
A map showing Tulse Hill as it appeared in 1918.

=== Buses ===
The area is served by London Buses routes 2, 68, 196, 201, 322, 415, 432, 468 and P13.

=== Rail ===
Tulse Hill railway station (Zone 3) is served by the Southern Metro via Peckham Rye line (to London Bridge) and the Thameslink Wimbledon loop (to St Albans via Blackfriars, City Thameslink, Farringdon, and St Pancras). The railway bridge over the A205 was frequently subject to vehicle strikes until a new warning system was installed in 2017.

Nearby stations provide services to Victoria from Herne Hill and West Dulwich (via the Southeastern Metro Bromley South line) and from West Norwood (via the Southern Crystal Palace line).

The nearest London Underground station is Brixton on the Victoria line.

=== Roads ===
At the southern end of Tulse Hill is a major road junction between the A204 (Tulse Hill), A205 (South Circular) and the A215 (Norwood Road) where the historic Tulse Hill Hotel stands.

== Cultural references in literature ==
The "Tulse Hill Parliament", a political club, features in P. G. Wodehouse's comic novel Psmith in the City. The author attended Dulwich College, which is in the vicinity.

Noel Streatfeild's novel "Tennis Shoes" (1937) is written about a family who live in Tulse Hill.

Samson Young, protagonist in Martin Amis's London Fields goes to Tulse Hill to buy drugs.

Jason Strugnell, a fictional poet in Wendy Cope's Making Cocoa For Kingsley Amis, lives in Tulse Hill and mentions it a couple of times in "his" poems.

Tulse Hill and its surrounding areas are locations in Mark Billingham's crime novel "In The Dark".

== Prominent buildings ==
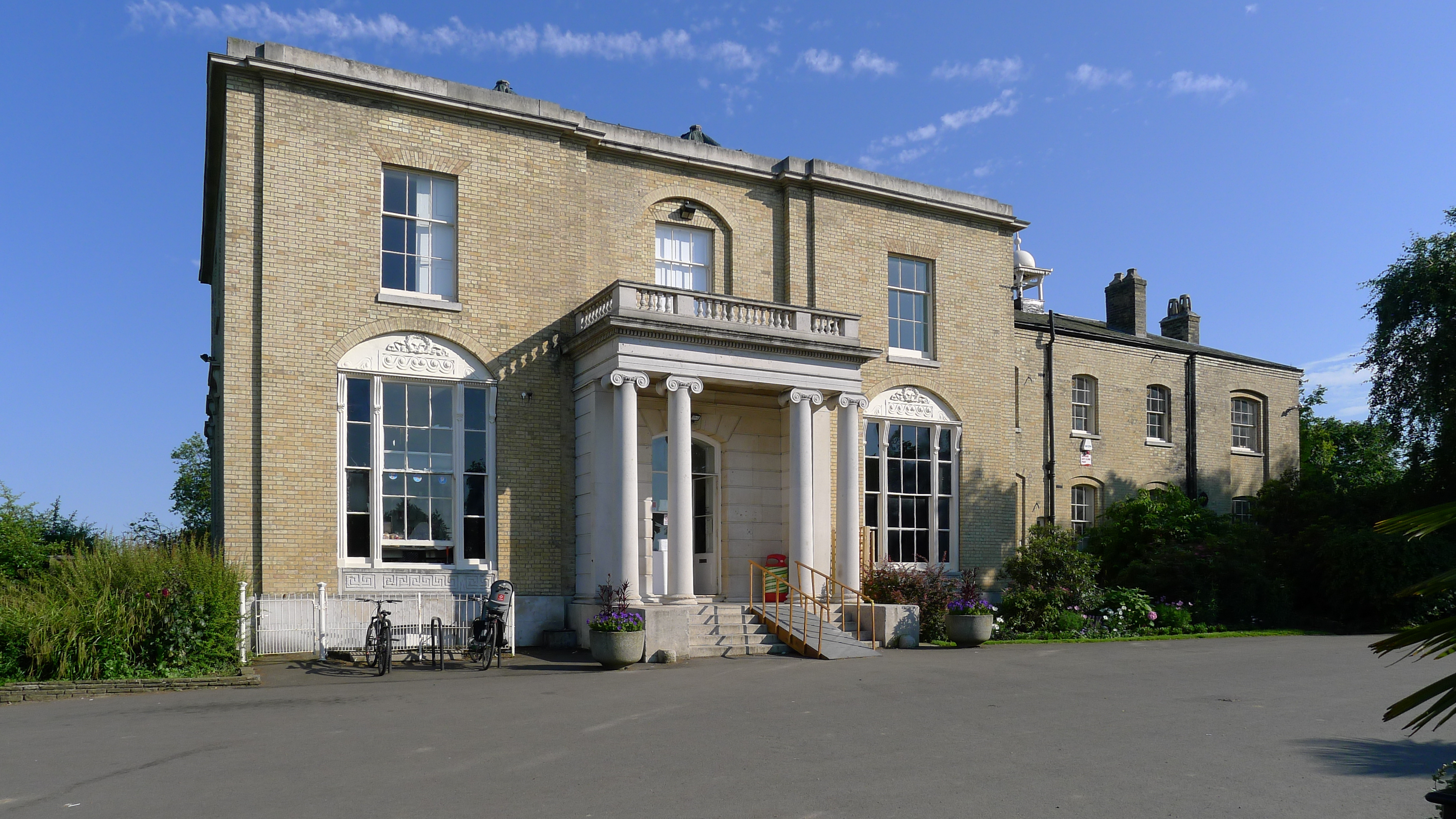
Brockwell Hall sits at the top of Brockwell Park.

- Brockwell Hall - built 1811–1813, grade II listed.
- Brockwell Lido - opened 1938, grade II listed.
- Carisbrooke - mid 19th century villa, grade II listed.
- Holy Trinity Church, Trinity Rise - built 1855–6, grade II listed.
- St Martin-In-The-Fields High School for Girls - built mid 19th century, grade II listed.
- Strand School - Grammar School building, opened in 1913 in Elm Park; it is now called Elm Court School.
- 166 Tulse Hill - early-mid 19th century villa, grade II listed.

== Notable people ==
- Julian Cope, lead singer of band Teardrop Explodes, lived at 149a Tulse Hill in the late 1980s where, as he described in his autobiography Repossessed, he had a 40 ft Scalextric track and an extensive collection of Corgi, Dinky and other toy cars.
- Michael Finnissy, composer
- Sir William Henry Harris was a chorister at Holy Trinity Church towards the end of the 19th century.
- The astronomers Sir William Huggins and his wife Margaret Lindsay, Lady Huggins, had a home and observatory known as Huggins' Observatory from about 1850 until 1915 at 90 Upper Tulse Hill. It no longer stands but was at the approximate location of today's Vibart Gardens.
- The Ionides family lived there between 1838 and 1864. Alexander Constantine Ionides was Greek consul, art patron and donor. His son Constantine Alexander Ionides left his collection of Old Masters to the Victoria and Albert Museum.
- Mick Jones, guitarist in The Clash, lived in Christchurch House on Christchurch Road with his aunt during his childhood years.
- Arthur Mee (1875–1943), British writer, journalist and educator, author of The King's England and The Children's Encyclopædia.
- Jean Charles de Menezes (1978–2005), Brazilian man killed by officers of the Metropolitan Police at Stockwell station after he was wrongly deemed to be involved in the previous day's failed bombing attempts.
- John Sentamu, previous Archbishop of York, was vicar of Holy Trinity Church for 13 years.
- Euan Uglow, artist.
