= Charles Marsham, 2nd Earl of Romney =

British Earl and politician (1777–1845)

The Right Honourable The Earl of Romney
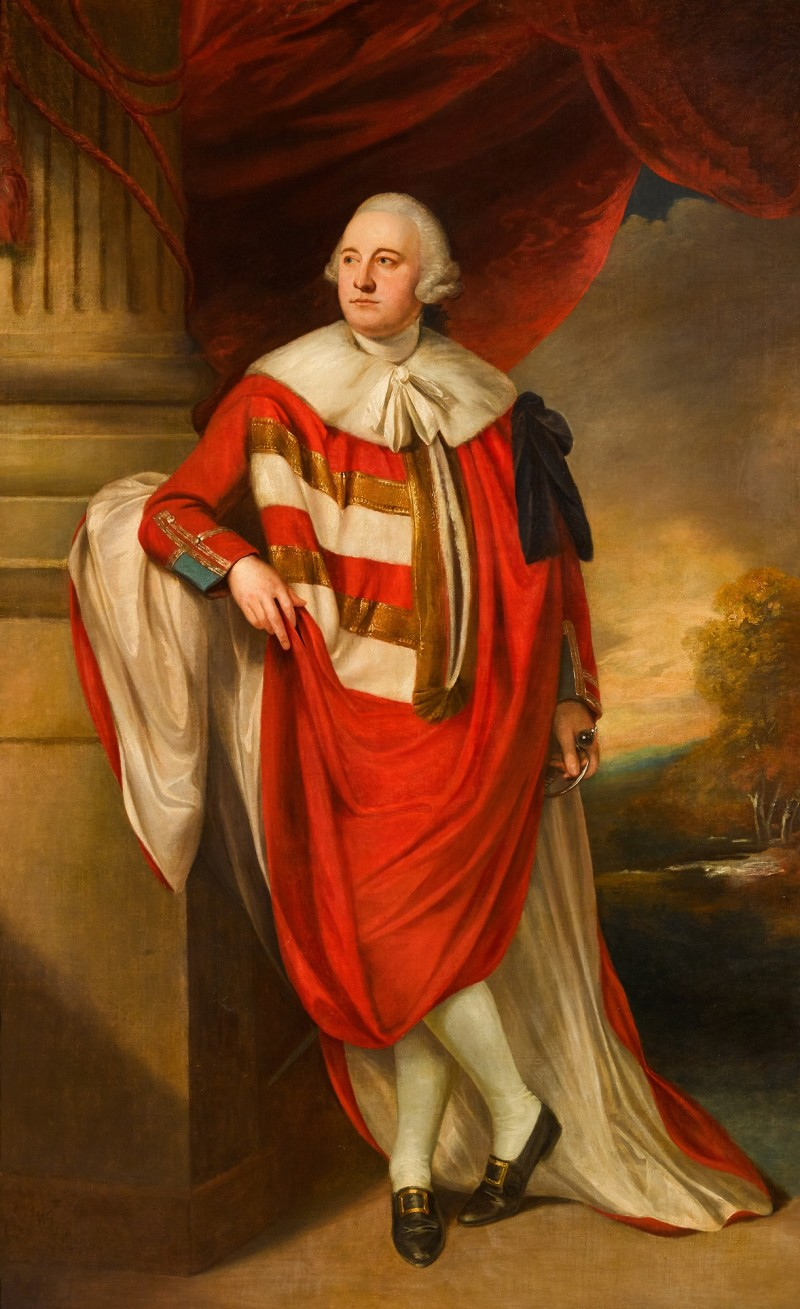
- Portrait of Charles Marsham, 2nd Earl of Romney

Member of Parliament for Hythe
- In office 1798–1802; 1806–1807

Member of Parliament for Downton
- In office 1803–1806

Personal details
- Born: 22 November 1777
- Died: 29 March 1845 (aged 67)
- Spouse(s): Sophia Pitt (m. 1806; died 1812) Mary Elizabeth Townshend (m. 1832)
- Children: 6, including Charles
- Parents: Charles Marsham (father); Frances Wyndham (mother)
- Relatives: Robert Marsham (grandfather); Charles Wyndham (grandfather); Alicia Carpenter (grandmother)

Charles Marsham, 2nd Earl of Romney (22 November 1777 – 29 March 1845), styled Viscount Marsham between 1801 and 1811, was a British peer and politician.

== Biography ==
Romney was the son of Charles Marsham, 1st Earl of Romney, and Lady Frances, daughter of Charles Wyndham, 2nd Earl of Egremont.

Romney was Member of Parliament for Hythe from 1798 to 1802 and from 1806 to 1807 and for Downton from 1803 to 1806. In 1809 he was commissioned as Lieutenant-Colonel Commandant of the Bearsted and Malling Regiment of Local Militia. In 1811 he succeeded his father in the earldom and entered the House of Lords.

According to the Legacies of British Slave-Ownership at University College London, Romney was awarded a payment as a slave trader in the aftermath of the Slavery Abolition Act 1833 with the Slave Compensation Act 1837. The British Government took out a £15 million loan (worth £1.8 billion in 2023) with interest from Nathan Mayer Rothschild and Moses Montefiore, which was subsequently paid off by the British taxpayers (ending in 2015). Romney was associated with three different claims, two of which were successful; he owned 432 slaves in Saint Kitts and Nevis and received a £7,268 payment at the time (worth £871,245 in 2023).

== Marriages and children ==
Lord Romney was twice married. On 9 September 1806 he married Sophia Pitt, daughter of William Morton Pitt. They had one son and four daughters:

- Lady Sophia Marsham (born 13 July 1807, died 4 January 1863), who married Peter Richard Hoare.
- Charles Marsham, 3rd Earl of Romney (born 30 July 1808, died 3 September 1874)
- Lady Frances Marsham (born 9 November 1809, died 29 December 1901), who married Major-General E C Fletcher (died 1877).
- Lady Mary Marsham (born 15 April 1811, died 23 February 1871), who married the banker Henry Hoare (1807–1866).
- Lady Charlotte Marsham (born 30 August 1812, died 18 November 1879)

Lady Romney died in September 1812, shortly after the birth of her youngest child.

On 8 February 1832 Lord Romney married secondly the Hon Mary Elizabeth Townshend, daughter of John Townshend, 2nd Viscount Sydney and widow of George James Cholmondeley. They had one son:

- Hon Robert Marsham-Townshend (born 15 November 1834, died 11 December 1914)

Lord Romney died in March 1845, aged 67, and was succeeded by his only son from his first marriage, Charles. Lady Romney died in December 1847.

Parliament of Great Britain
Preceded by William Evelyn; Sir Charles Farnaby-Radcliffe, Bt	Member of Parliament for Hythe; 1798–1801; With: William Evelyn	Succeeded by Parliament of the United Kingdom
Parliament of the United Kingdom
Preceded by Parliament of Great Britain	Member of Parliament for Hythe; 1801–1802; With: William Evelyn	Succeeded by Matthew White; Thomas Godfrey
Preceded by Hon. John Ward; The Lord de Blaquiere	Member of Parliament for Downton; 1803–1806; With: The Lord de Blaquiere	Succeeded by Hon. Bartholomew Bouverie; Hon. Duncombe Pleydell-Bouverie
Preceded by Matthew White; Thomas Godfrey	Member of Parliament for Hythe; 1806–1807; With: Thomas Godfrey	Succeeded by Thomas Godfrey; William Deedes
Peerage of the United Kingdom
Preceded by Charles Marsham	Earl of Romney; 1811–1845	Succeeded by Charles Marsham
