= Charles Farnaby =

Charles Farnaby may refer to:

- Sir Charles Farnaby, 1st Baronet (1674–1741), of the Farnaby baronets
- Sir Charles Farnaby-Radcliffe, 3rd Baronet (c. 1740–1798), of the Farnaby baronets, MP for Hythe and Kent
- Sir Charles Francis Farnaby, 5th Baronet (1787–1859), of the Farnaby baronets

== See also ==
- Farnaby (surname)
