= Countess of Romney =

Countess of Romney is the title given to the wife of the Earl of Romney. It has been held by several women, including:

- Sophia Marsham, Countess of Romney (died 1812)
- Mary Elizabeth Marsham, Countess of Romney (died 1847)

Frances Marsham, Lady Romney (died 1795) is sometimes referred to as "Countess of Romney", but never held the title as her husband did not inherit the earldom until after her death.
