= Matthew White (MP) =

British politician

Matthew White (c. 1766 – 11 March 1840) was a British politician. He sat in the House of Commons of the United Kingdom as a Member of Parliament (MP) for Hythe, from 1802 to 1806 and 1812–1818.

== Early life ==
He was the son of Thomas White (died 1781), a New York merchant and a loyalist named in the New York Act of Attainder of 1779, and his wife Ann Campbell. Having left British North America in 1778, he went to London, where in 1781 he was apprenticed to the merchant and shipbuilder Robert Wigram, for five years.

== In business ==
By the mid-1790s, White was in partnership with Walter Cleland, in Cleland, White & Co. Cleland, a Freemason, was a banker, and had formerly been in the East India Company (EIC), and in 1792 was a partner in Mercantile House, Calcutta. In 1795 Cleland was one of the managers, with William Hickey and others, of the New Calcutta Lottery.

In 1802, Cleland, White & Co. had premises in Old Broad Street. White is mentioned by C. Northcote Parkinson in a list of "City men", at the beginning of the 19th century, who were managing owners of "four or five ships", with Sir Robert Preston, 6th Baronet, William Moffat and others; Wigram occurs as owner of six. In a letter of 1802 to the Court of Directors of the East India Company, White signed as managing owner of two EIC ships from 1799, the Hugh Inglis and the Marquis Wellesley; these ships had been built for White, tenders being accepted by the EIC. That year, however, the partnership failed; and Cleland "lost his reason". In due course White suffered bankruptcy; he took agent's work, as a ship's husband.

In later life White was a stockbroker at Lothbury.

== In politics ==
In the 1802 general election, in the two-member constituency of Hythe, White and Thomas Godfrey (MP for Hythe) broke the control of local landowners, defeating Viscount Marsham and the nominee of William Evelyn who was retiring; they did this by appealing to the independent voters. In 1806, however, it was a three-cornered contest with Viscount Marsham and Godfrey winning out, the latter having support from both the local corporation and the government.

For the 1807 general election, White returned to Hythe, this time partnered by Thomas William Plummer, a Whig merchant elected Member for Yarmouth in 1806. They came respectively third and fourth in the poll, behind Godfrey and William Deedes. In the 1812 general election, Godfrey had died and Deeded withdrew; and the merchant and banker Sir John Perring, 1st Baronet was a sitting Member. On this occasion White was elected in second place, ahead of Plummer.

In the House of Commons, White was unremarkable, from 1812 usually voting with the government. He concerned himself with lobbying for compensation on behalf of American loyalists. He was not re-elected in 1818.

== Family ==
White was married and fathered at least 16 children.

Parliament of the United Kingdom
Preceded by Hon. Charles Marsham; William Evelyn	Member of Parliament for Hythe; 1802 – 1806; With: Thomas Godfrey	Succeeded by Thomas Godfrey; Viscount Marsham
Preceded by William Deedes; Sir John Perring	Member of Parliament for Hythe; 1812 – 1818; With: Sir John Perring	Succeeded by Sir John Perring; John Bladen Taylor
