= Mote Park (cricket ground) =

Cricket ground in Maidstone, Kent, England

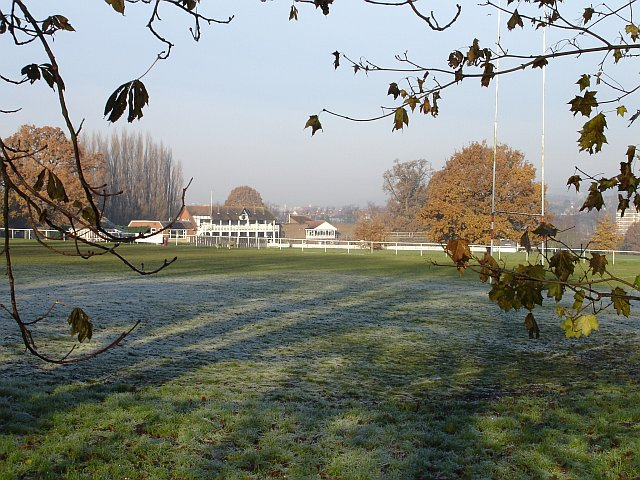
- The Mote in December 2005
- Interactive map of Mote Park

Ground information
- Location: Maidstone, Kent
- Country: England
- Coordinates: 51.268°N 0.536°E
- Home club: The Mote Cricket Club
- Establishment: 1854 (first recorded match)
- Owner: The Mote Cricket Club
- End names
- Mote Avenue End; West Park Road End

Team information
Mote Park Cricket Club	(1855–1977)
Kent County Cricket Club	(1859–2005)
The Mote Cricket Club	(1867–present)
Maidstone FC	(1950s–present)
- As of 1 March 2018; Source: CricketArchive

Mote Park, also known as The Mote, is a cricket ground in Maidstone in the English county of Kent. It is inside the grounds of Mote Park and is owned by The Mote Cricket Club. The ground is also used by the Mote Squash Club and the Maidstone rugby club. It was used by Kent County Cricket Club as one of its out-grounds for county cricket matches. The club played over 200 first-class cricket matches on the ground between 1859 and 2005.

The ground is located around 0.8 miles (1.3 km) south-east of the centre of Maidstone on the western fringe of Mote Park. The A229 road runs 0.5 miles (0.8 km) to the east of the ground, Maidstone Leisure Centre is immediately to the south of the ground, and Maidstone Grammar School is just south-west of the site. Originally the ground was separated from the urban area of Maidstone by farmland, but 20th-century housing has been built up to the western edges of the site.

== Establishment ==
The ground was established in the mid-19th century inside Mote Park, at the time a 558 acres (226 ha) country estate to the west of Maidstone. It had been emparked in the 14th century, and by the end of the 17th century it was owned by the Marsham family. Charles Marsham, 1st Earl of Romney, built a new mansion in the grounds of the park in the 1790s, and the grounds were redeveloped during the mid-19th century by both the 2nd and 3rd Earls. Mote Park is designated as a historic site.

Cricket was first played on a ground in the park in 1854, and the ground was fully established by 1857. The park was sold to Marcus Samuel, 1st Viscount Bearsted, in 1895, and the ground developed extensively under his ownership to allow it to be used regularly for county cricket. The ground was levelled and the pitch turned through 90 degrees in 1907. The cricket pavilion and The Tabernacle, built as Viscount Bearsted's private pavilion, were built between 1909 and 1910.

After the death of the 1st Viscount Bearsted in 1927, his son sold Mote Park itself to Maidstone Corporation, with the cricket ground excluded from the sale and gifted to The Mote. The Tabernacle was initially gifted to the Band of Brothers, a private cricket club closely associated with the county club, and was eventually transferred to The Mote in the 1940s.

== Cricket history ==
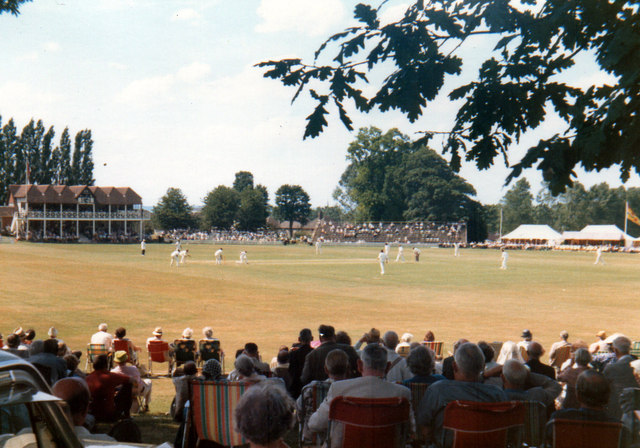
Kent v Surrey at Mote Park in 1973

The first known match at Mote Park was between Maidstone and an All-England XI in 1854, with Maidstone playing with 18 batsmen. A Mote Park team first used the ground the following year.

The first match given retrospective first-class cricket status took place in 1859, with Kent playing MCC. The county used the ground twice in the 1860s before beginning to play more regularly there in the 1870s. The ground saw several matches played by the amateur Gentlemen of Kent team during the 1860s, and the Australian Aborigine team played there twice during their tour of England in 1868. Other touring teams to have played at the ground include the Australians in 1890, the 1912 and 1951 South Africans, the 1954 Canadians, and the New Zealanders in 1965 and 1969.

Other than a break when the ground was re-laid in 1908 and 1909, Kent used the ground regularly for an annual cricket week until the end of the 2005 season. Over 200 first-class matches took place on the ground, with Kent also using it for limited overs cricket from 1969. It was removed from the list of county grounds used by Kent when an over-watered "green" wicket, prepared for a County Championship match against Gloucestershire, led to a low-scoring game that ended after less than two days. The club was deducted eight points because of the state of the pitch.

The ground was also used by Kent's Second XI, including in the Second XI Championship, and by the Kent Cricket Board team in both List A cricket and the Minor Counties Trophy. The Kent Women cricket team first used the ground in 1936, and the ground was used by England Women XIs to play touring teams in 1937 and 1979, with one of the two matches taking place against the West Indies Women in 1979 being an official One Day International.

Redevelopment of the facilities at the ground had been approved during 2005 as part of a larger scheme to increase the profile of cricket in the county town. Since 2005 The Mote Cricket Club has relaid a number of wickets at a cost of £14,000 with the help of grants and technical assistance from the County Cricket Club and Maidstone Borough Council. Kent have expressed a wish to return to the ground at some point, although as of April 2016 the quality of the wicket and the pavilion were still seen as issues that needed to be addressed.

== Records on the ground ==
A total of 218 first-class matches were held on the ground between 1859 and 2005, all of them featuring Kent as the home team. Kent also played List A matches regularly on the ground, with 53 fixtures played between 1969 and 2005. The Kent Cricket Board played another five List A matches on the ground in the Cheltenham & Gloucester Trophy between 1999 and 2002. Two of Kent's T20 matches were hosted at the ground in 2004.

=== First-class cricket ===
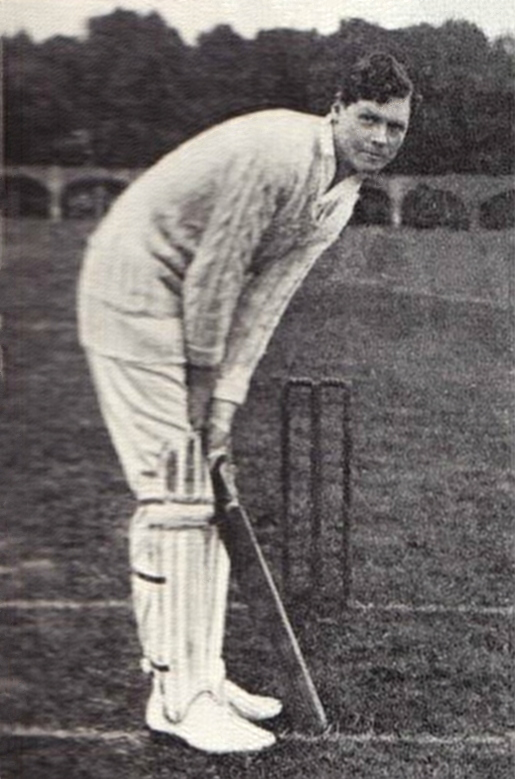
Percy Chapman made the highest individual score at Mote Park in 1927

- Highest total: 580/6 declared by Kent against Essex, 1947, and 580/9 declared by Kent against Yorkshire in 1998
- Lowest total: 31 by Hampshire against Kent, 1967
- Highest partnership: 368, 4th wicket by PA de Silva and GR Cowdrey, for Kent against Derbyshire, 1995
- Highest individual score: 260, APF Chapman for Kent against Lancashire, 1927
- Best bowling in an innings: 10/131, AP Freeman for Kent against Lancashire, 1929
- Best bowling in a match: 15/114, Mohammad Sami for Kent against Nottinghamshire, 2003

The partnership between de Silva and Cowdrey set a new record as the highest partnership for any wicket for Kent. It remained Kent's highest partnership in first-class cricket until 2017, when it was surpassed by Sean Dickson and Joe Denly, who made 382 runs for the 2nd wicket against Northants at County Cricket Ground, Beckenham.

In 1910, Colin Blythe and Frank Woolley bowled unchanged throughout both innings of a fixture with Yorkshire, repeating a performance from 1889, also against Yorkshire, by bowlers Walter Wright and Fred Martin.

=== List A cricket ===
- Highest total: 338/6 by Kent against Somerset, 1996 (50-over match)
- Lowest total: 65 by Warwickshire against Kent, 1979
- Highest partnership: 172, 2nd wicket by D Byas and DS Lehmann, for Yorkshire against Kent, 1998
- Highest individual score: 122, ET Smith for Kent against Glamorgan, 2003
- Best bowling: 5/19, DL Underwood for Kent against Gloucestershire, 1972

In 1995, Mark Ealham set a record for the fastest century in 40-over cricket. In 44 balls, Ealham scored a hundred, with nine sixes and nine fours. This remained the Kent record for the fastest century in List A cricket until Darren Stevens equalled the record in 2013.

=== Twenty20 cricket ===
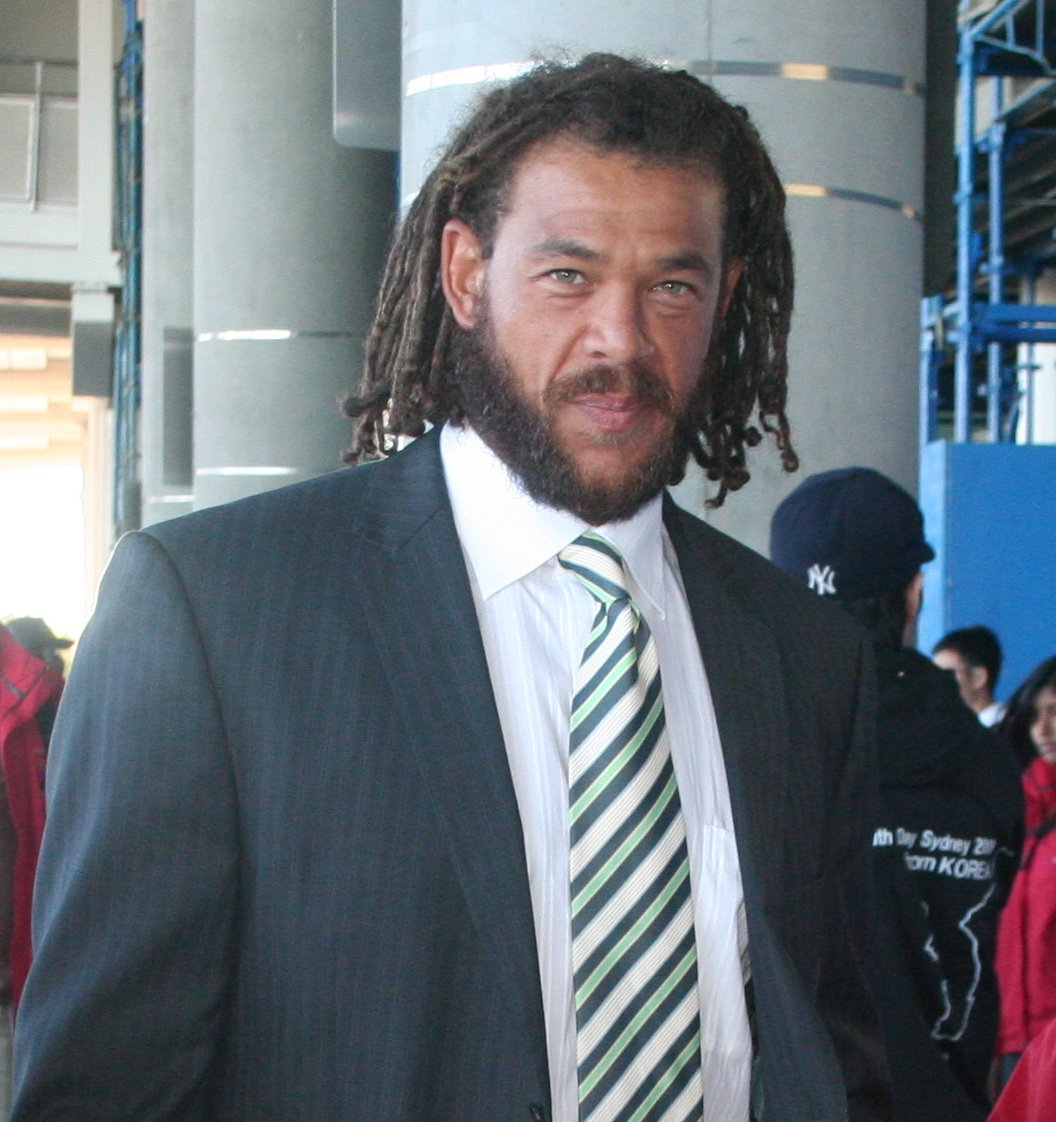
Andrew Symonds scored the only T20 century on the ground.

Two Twenty20 matches were played on the ground in 2004. Kent made the highest T20 score on the ground, scoring 157/3 against Middlesex, who made 155/7 in reply. The match was reduced by rain to 18 overs per side. Middlesex batted first, and Kent reached their target in only 13.1 overs. Andrew Symonds scored 112 runs in the match, the only T20 century scored on the ground. Symonds scored his century in 34 balls, at the time a record for the fastest century in T20 cricket. As of March 2018, it remains the third-quickest century scored in top-level T20 matches worldwide and the fastest scored in the UK.

The best bowling figures in a T20 match on the ground were 4 wickets for 20 runs from 3.2 overs by Scott Brant for Essex in the ground's other T20 match.

== Other uses ==
As of 2018, the ground is the current home of Maidstone FC, who have played rugby union on it since the 1950s. The redevelopment of parts of the ground is likely to mean that the rugby club moves to a new ground in the future.

The ground is also the home of The Mote Squash Club.
