= Hans Moritz von Brühl =

German diplomat and astronomer (1736–1809)

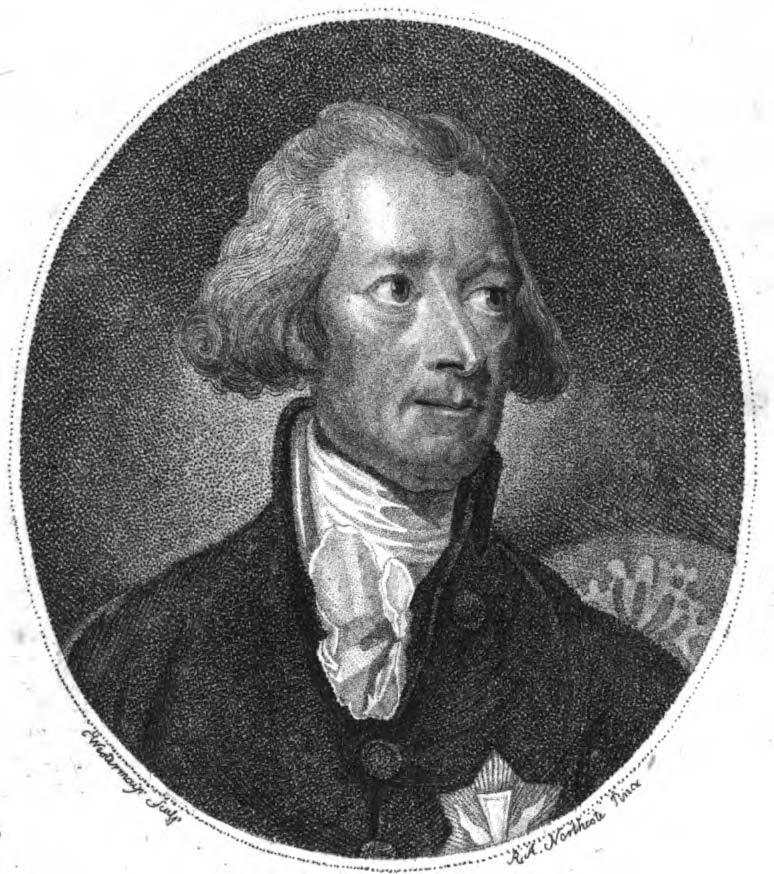
Hans Moritz von Brühl.

Hans Moritz von Brühl (20 December 1736 – 22 January 1809) was a German diplomat and astronomer, resident for much of his life in London, where he was known as John Maurice, Count of Brühl.

== Life ==
He was the son of F. W. Graf von Brühl of Martinskirchen, who died in 1760, and nephew of the Polish-Saxon statesman Heinrich von Brühl. Born at Wiederau in the Electorate of Saxony, he studied at Leipzig, and there formed a close friendship with Christian Gellert, who corresponded with him for some years. At Paris, in 1755, Brühl, then in his nineteenth year, took an active part in Saxon diplomacy, and was summoned to Warsaw in 1759. He was named, through his uncle's influence, chamberlain and commandant in Thuringia, and in 1764 appointed ambassador extraordinary to the court of St. James's.

He loved astronomy and promoted its interests. Through his influence Franz Xaver von Zach, who entered his family as tutor shortly after his arrival in London in November 1783, became an astronomer. With a Hadley's sextant and a chronometer by Josiah Emery, they together determined, in 1785, the latitudes and longitudes of Brussels, Frankfort, Dresden, and Paris. Brühl built (probably in 1787) a small observatory at his villa at Harefield, and set up there, about 1794, a two-foot astronomical circle by Jesse Ramsden, one of the first instruments of the kind made in England. He was intimate with William Herschel, and transmitted news of discoveries abroad through Johann Elert Bode's Jahrbuch. He supported the advancement of chronometry, in the work of Thomas Mudge and Emery.

He also gave attention to political economy, and made a tour through the remoter parts of England early in 1783 to investigate the state of trade and agriculture.

In 1765, he was elected a Fellow of the Royal Society. From 1788 he belonged to the Saxon privy council, and was a knight of the White Eagle. Except for one journey homeward in 1785, he never afterwards left England, but died at his house in Old Burlington Street on 22 January 1809, aged 72. He was buried at Harefield, Middlesex on 30 January 1809.

== Works ==
He wrote:

- 'Recherches sur divers Objets de l'Économie Politique,’ Dresden, 1781
- 'Three Registers of a Pocket Chronometer,’ London, 1785.
- 'Latitudes and Longitudes of several Places ascertained,’ London, 1786.
- 'Nouveau Journal du Chronomètre,’ fol., London, 1790.
- 'On the Investigation of Astronomical Circles,’ London, 1794, translated, with additions, by Von Zach in Hindenberg's 'Archiv der reinen und angewandten Mathematik,’ i. 257, Leipzig, 1795.
- 'A Register of Mr. Mudge's Timekeepers,’ London, 1794.

Contributions by him are to be found in Bode's 'Astronomisches Jahrbuch' for 1790–4, 1797–9, and in suppl. vols. i. ii. iii., as well as in Canzler and Meissner's 'Quartal-Schrift' (including essays on English finance), Leipzig, 1783–5. Appended to T. Mudge junior's 'Reply to Dr. Maskelyne' (1792) there is by him 'A short Explanation of the most proper Methods of calculating a mean Daily Rate;’ and he furnished Bergasse with a preface for his 'Betrachtungen über den thierischen Magnetismus,’ Dresden, 1790.

== Family ==
He married, first, in 1767, Alicia Maria, dowager countess of Egremont, daughter of George Carpenter, 2nd Baron Carpenter; she died on 1 June 1794, leaving him a daughter; secondly, in 1796, Mary Chowne (1741-1811), daughter of Thomas Chowne of Alfriston,(1713-1788) and Mary Tilson.

== Chess Player ==
"Count de Bruhl" was next to Philidor, Verdoni and George Atwood one of the greatest chess players of his time.
