= William Frederick Wyndham =

English aristocrat and diplomat

Hon. William Frederick Wyndham (6 April 1763 – 11 February 1828) was an English aristocrat and diplomat, who served in Italy during the Italian campaigns of the French Revolutionary Wars.

== Early life ==
Wyndham was the fourth and youngest son of Charles Wyndham, 2nd Earl of Egremont and Hon. Alicia Maria Carpenter, daughter of George Carpenter, 2nd Baron Carpenter and Lady of the Bedchamber to Queen Charlotte. He served briefly as a commissioned officer in the Coldstream Guards, but had resigned his commission by 1784.

== Ambassador to Tuscany ==
From 1794 to 1814, Wyndham was the British ambassador to Tuscany. By the 1790s, he already had a reputation for being a difficult and radical character, and Lady Holland recorded surprise at his appointment as ambassador:

I went to supper at Lord Elgin's. Nobody would credit that W. Wyndham was appointed Minister to Florence; "Comment done, ce petit polisson (rascal), ce petit Jacobin." He passed last winter here, and belonged to the Jacobin Club at Paris, and was very much slighted here. Lord Elgin frankly told me he doubted my story, it was impossible that such a man could be employed [...] W. Wyndham's appointment is not much relished, as the Court want a steady, reasonable man, disposed to soothe matters, and, God knows, poor Wyndham is not capable of filling that post.

Wyndham arrived in Florence on 20 March 1794 with instructions from the British government to win the support of the traditionally neutral Grand Duchy against France. He soon after had a disagreement with a Florentine count, Carletti, owing to Wyndham's Jacobin principles, which damaged his reputation.

In anticipation of the French capture of Livorno in 1796, Wyndham advised British merchants to evacuate their goods from the territory. In August of that year he travelled to Naples in an attempt to win Neapolitan support for the war against France. In 1799 he monitored the armed counter-revolution in Tuscany against the French occupation, but in May 1800 the rebels were defeated by the French and Wyndham left Italy for Vienna with the exiled Tuscan government. He remained in Vienna until his retirement in 1807.

== Marriage and issue ==
On 21 July 1784, Wyndham married Frances Mary Harford, the illegitimate daughter of Frederick Calvert, 6th Baron Baltimore and Hester Whelan. They had five children:

- George Francis Wyndham (1786–1845), succeeded his uncle as 4th Earl of Egremont
- Frances Wyndham (bapt. 18 February 1789 – 1870), married firstly in 1809 William Miller, of Ozleworth Park, co. Gloucester, and married secondly in 1847 as his second wife Augustin Denis Pinon-Duclos, 2nd Vicomte de Valmer
- Laura Wyndham (bapt. 6 May 1790 – 6 September 1833), married 1812 Rev. Charles Boultbee, and had issue
- Julia Wyndham (11 January 1793 – February 1811), died young; buried at Petworth
- William Wyndham (bapt. 20 July 1794 – 5 October 1795), died in infancy in Italy

She died 22 March 1822 in Florence.

Wyndham had three illegitimate children with his second wife, Polish noble Julia Konstancja Smorczewska, Countess Spytecka (born Warsaw, c. 1785 – 1 November 1871), widow of Count Ignacy Spytecki (Ukrainian: Ігнацій Спитецький), Chamberlain of the King of Poland, from whom she inherited lands in Kydantsi, Ternopil, Kingdom of Galicia and Lodomeria (now Ukraine).

- Julia Karolina Maria Wyndham (1 March 1807 – 18 June 1893), baptised Catholic in April 1807 in Vienna and Anglican in Heydon, Essex, in 1811; married (under the name Julia Wyndham Spytecka) in 1830 Richard Hasler, of Aldingbourne House, Sussex
- Col. Arthur Wyndham (19 April 1813 – 29 March 1874), served with the Madras Infantry in India and China. Married in 1856 Emily Frances Ballantine Spedding.
- Emily Frances Wyndham (5 April 1822 – 1 June 1899), born in Königsberg; married in 1848 James Dykes Spedding (died 1851); married secondly in 1859 Maj. George Charles Degen Lewis (1795–1871)

Diplomatic posts
Preceded by Lord Hervey	British Minister to Tuscany; 1794–1814	Succeeded by The Earl of Westmorland
