= Charles William Wyndham =

English politician

Charles William Wyndham (8 October 1760 – 1 July 1828) was an English politician.

He was the third son of Charles Wyndham, 2nd Earl of Egremont and Alicia Maria, daughter of the 2nd Baron Carpenter, and brother of Hon. Percy Charles Wyndham. He was educated at Westminster School from 1767 to 1775, and in 1801, he married Lady Anna Barbara Frances Child Villiers, daughter of the 4th Earl of Jersey and widow of William Henry Lambton of Lambton, County Durham. They had no children. According to some, he "proposed marriage to a gentlewoman one day, married her the next and parted from her the day after" so offspring would have been unlikely.

At the 1790 general election, Charles and his older brother, Percy, were returned as the two Members of Parliament (MPs) for Midhurst, a pocket borough in West Sussex which had recently been purchased by their oldest brother George, the 3rd Earl of Egremont.

Wyndham gave up the Midhurst seat in 1795, shortly before his brother sold it, in order to sit for New Shoreham. He held that seat until 1802, when his brother persuaded him to stand for the county seat of Sussex. He held that seat until he stood down in 1812.

== Scandal ==
Wyndham was the defendant in a notorious 'criminal conversation' (adultery) case, brought by Anthony Hodges, regarding his wife Anna Sophia Hodges née Aston. Hodges claimed he had been long separated from his wife on suspicion of her adultery, after which point she became pregnant. During the trial, which happened in Westminster in February 1791 before Lord Kenyon, Mrs Hodges was confirmed to be pregnant and living with the defendant. However it was argued that the plaintiff had not only known about the affair, but had prostituted his wife to a Mr Bouvier, and the Prince of Wales (later George IV) as early as 1784. The jury returned a verdict in favour of the defendant.

Wyndham and Anna Hodges had a daughter Caroline Wyndham (d. 1876), who married Rev. Hon. FitzRoy Henry Richard Stanhope.

Parliament of Great Britain
Preceded by Edward Cotsford; Hon. Henry Drummond	Member of Parliament for Midhurst; 1790 – 1795; With: Percy Wyndham	Succeeded by Percy Wyndham; Peter Thellusson
Preceded by John Clater Aldridge; Sir Harry Goring, Bt	Member of Parliament for New Shoreham; 1795 – 1800; With: Sir Harry Goring, Bt to 1796; Sir Cecil Bisshopp, Bt from 1796	Succeeded by Parliament of the United Kingdom
Parliament of the United Kingdom
Preceded by Parliament of Great Britain	Member of Parliament for New Shoreham; 1801 – 1802; With: Sir Cecil Bisshopp, Bt	Succeeded by Timothy Shelley; Sir Cecil Bisshopp, Bt
Preceded by John 'Mad Jack' Fuller; Charles Lennox	Member of Parliament for Sussex; 1807 – 1812; With: John 'Mad Jack' Fuller	Succeeded by Sir Godfrey Webster, Bt; Walter Burrell
