= William Evelyn (died 1813) =

British politician

William Evelyn (c. 1734–1813) was a British politician who sat in the House of Commons for 34 years from 1768 to 1802.

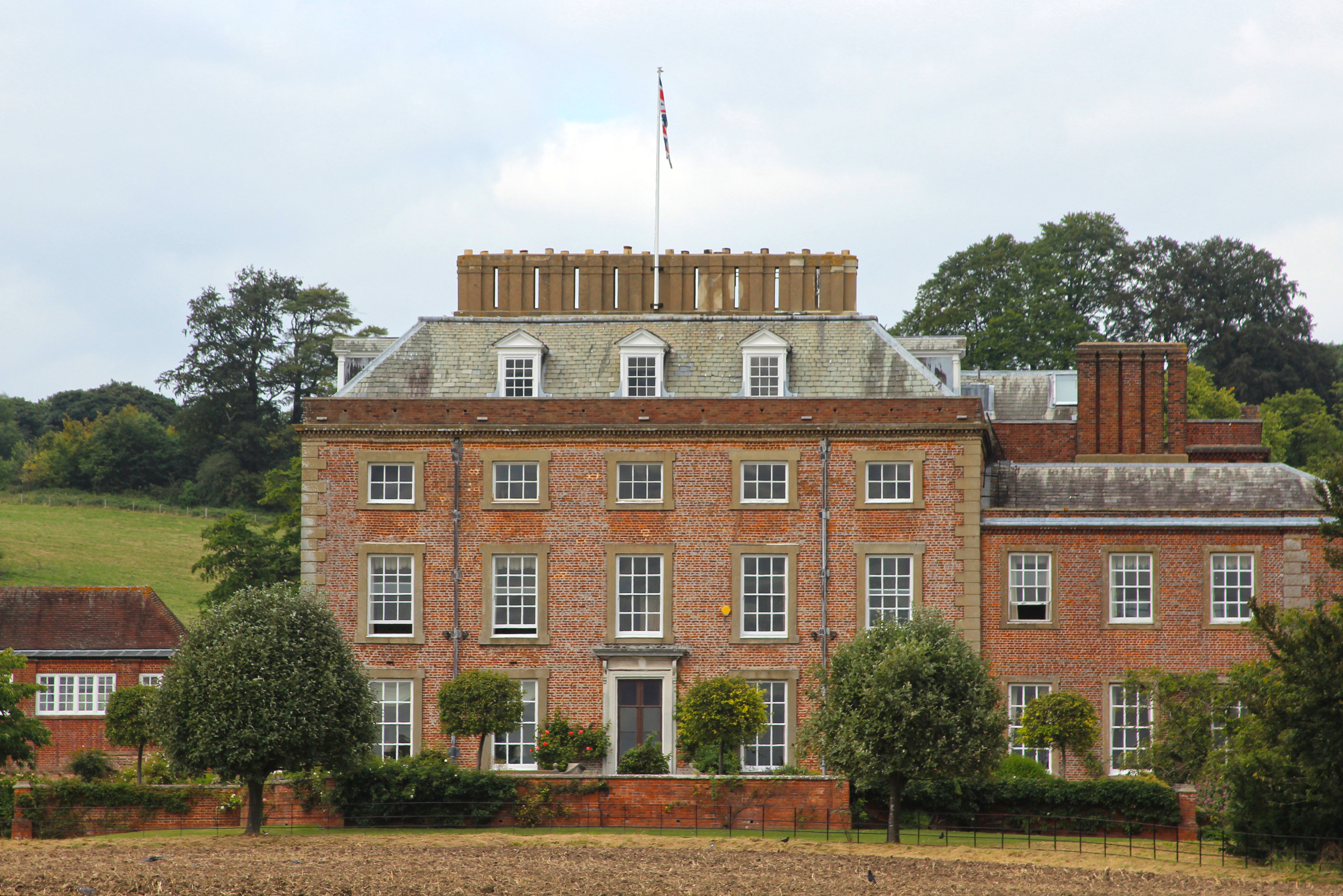
St Clere, Kent

Evelyn was the son of William Glanville, formerly Evelyn, and his second wife, Bridget Raymond, daughter of Hugh Raymond of Langley, Kenand. He was educated at Westminster School from 1744 to 1751. He married Susanna Barrett, daughter of Thomas Barrett of Shoreham, Kent, on 2 August 1760. His father died on 19 October 1766 and he succeeded to his father's estate at St Clere, Kent.

In the 1768 general election, Evelyn was elected in a contest as Member of Parliament for Hythe and was again returned for Hythe contests in 1774, 1780 and in 1784. By this time, he had established a personal interest and was returned unopposed in 1790 and 1796. In 1794, he was a lieutenant in the Kent yeoman cavalry.

Evelyn retired from Hythe in 1802 and tried unsuccessfully to secure the election of his son-in-law, Alexander Evelyn.

He died on 3 November 1813. aged 79 and was succeeded by his only surviving child, his daughter Frances. She had married Colonel Alexander Hume, who adopted the name of Evelyn, after inheriting St Clere.

Parliament of Great Britain
Preceded by Lord George Sackville; William Amherst	Member of Parliament for Hythe; 1768–1802; With: John Sawbridge; Sir Charles Farnaby; Hon. Charles Marsham	Succeeded by Matthew White; Thomas Godfrey
