= Sir John Perring, 1st Baronet =

Sir John Perring, 1st Baronet (26 April 1765 – 30 January 1831), FSA, of Membland in the parish of Holbeton, Devon, was a Member of Parliament and served as Lord Mayor of London in 1803. He was a commissioner for exchequer bills and senior partner of the banking firm John Perring, Shaw, Barber & Co., which having suffered in the Panic of 1825, resulted in Perring losing his estates. On 3 October 1808 he was created a baronet, first of the Perring baronets of Membland, Devon.

== Origins ==
Perring was described as "the son of a poor man". He was born in about 1765, the eldest son of Philip Perring (died 1797), of Denbury House, Church Street, Modbury in Devon, a serge maker, by his wife and cousin Susanna Legassick, daughter of Richard (or Pascoe) Legassick, apparently a wealthy cloth merchant at Modbury. The estate of Membland in the parish of Holbeton had been purchased by John Perring's uncle Peter Perring from John Bulteel (1733–1801), who had no further use for it having inherited the adjacent estate of Flete from his young nephew Courtenay Croker Bulteel of Flete and Lyneham, Yealmpton. Sir John Perring occupied Membland Hall in 1799 and from 1816 to 1827.

== Civic career ==
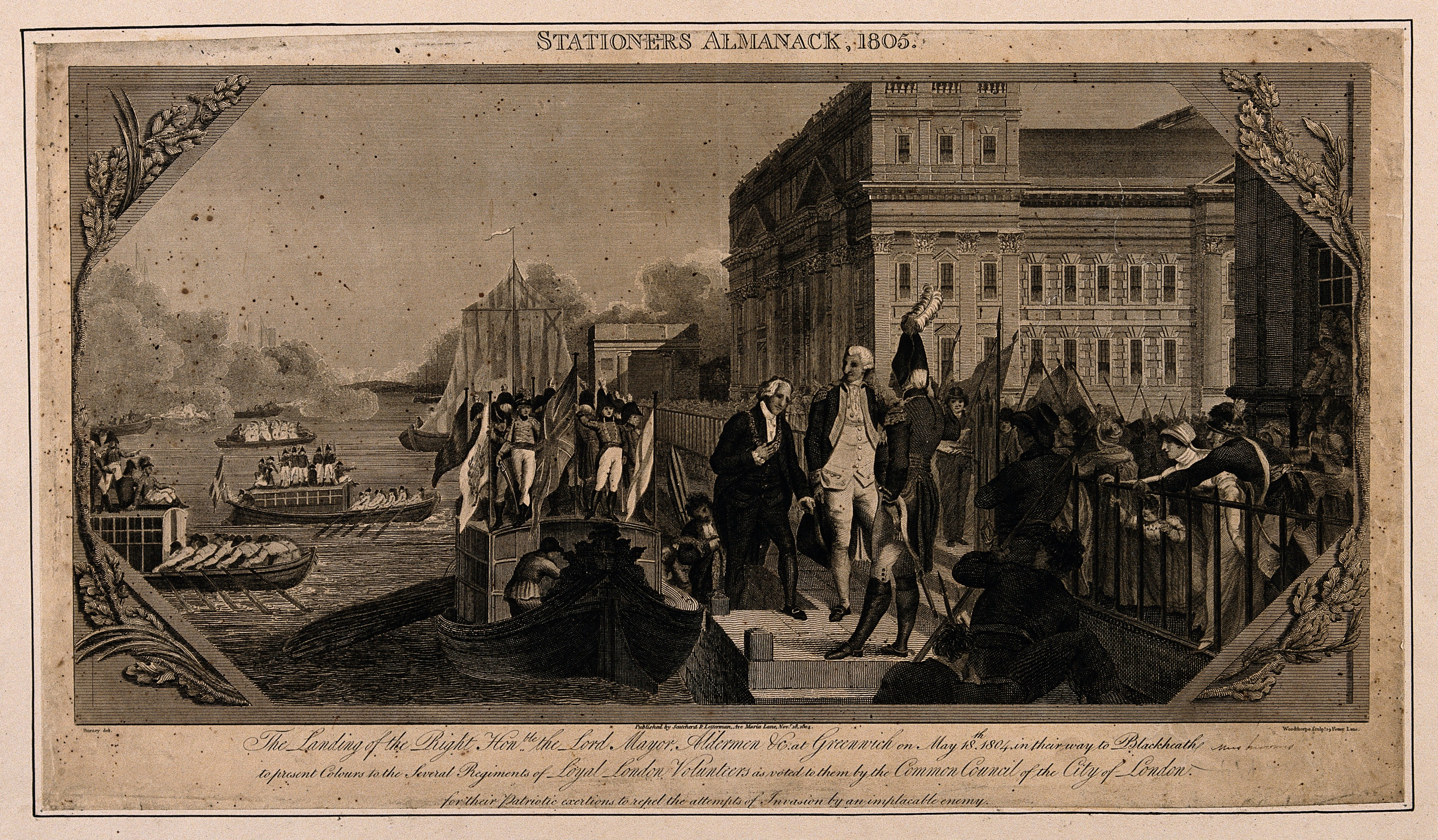
The Lord Mayor of London disembarking at the Royal Naval Hospital, Greenwich, on 18 May 1804

He was created an alderman in the City of London's Broad Street ward on 13 January 1798 as a clothworker. He was subsequently elected one of the Sheriffs of the City of London in 1800.

On 9 November 1803, Perring was proclaimed Lord Mayor of London. John Scott, 1st Earl of Eldon, in his capacity as Lord Chancellor informed King George III of Perring's appointment, privately describing Perring as "in private life a person of worth, and, in public, of sound and loyal principles".

John Silvester, the Recorder of London referenced the spectre of Napoleon Bonaparte and the burgeoning Napoleonic Wars in his announcement of Perring's appointment, stating that "At a time so awful as the present, when the country is threatened by an implacable and unprincipled enemy, it is of the last importance that the civic chair should be filled by a person in whom the greatest confidence can be placed". Silvester ominously warned Perring that "The keys of the Metropolis are placed in your hands, at the moment when the enemy are at the gates". The ball held later that day at Guildhall was opened with a minuet danced by Perring's eldest daughter and the Spanish Ambassador. The Napoleonic wars and the threat of a French invasion had led to coastal batteries being built as fortifications along the south coast of England in the summer of 1803. Perring was furious to find that a battery had been built on land that he owned at the mouth of the River Yealm in Devon, and wrote to the Secretary of War, Lord Hobart. Perring was eventually pacified by many letters from John Graves Simcoe, who was in charge of the construction of the defences. With the threat of invasion by the French still present, Perring presented the colours of the Corporation of London to the ten regiments of the London Loyal Infantry who assembled at Blackheath on 18 May 1804. Perring was accompanied on the grand procession to Blackheath by the Earl of Harrington, Earl Amherst and Prince Frederick, Duke of York.

== Post-mayoralty ==
Pering was elected the Member of Parliament for New Romney at the 1806 general election, but lost his seat the following year at the 1807 general election. He was re-elected to parliament in three successive elections for the Hythe constituency from 1810.

In 1808, Perring hosted a meeting of the "friends of Lady Hamilton", a group of financiers organised by Abraham Goldsmid to raise money for Emma, Lady Hamilton, the mistress of Lord Nelson, following Nelson's death.

Perring attended the coronation of George IV in July 1821. The satirist John Wolcot under his pseudonym of Peter Pindar, wrote an "Instructive epistle" to Perring, satirically proposing an "Address of Thanks" to Prime Minister Henry Addington for his "Great and Upright Conduct when Prime Minister".

A banker by trade, Perring headed the firm of John Perring, Shaw, Barber & Co. Perring's bank issued bonds for the South American land speculator Gregor MacGregor. The suspension of payments by Perring's bank in the subsequent Panic of 1825, and its failure to satisfy creditors in the panic led Perring to lose his estates.

== Marriage and children ==
In 1790 he married Elizabeth Cowell (died 1811), daughter of John Cowell of Stratford, Essex, by whom he had two sons and three daughters as follows:

- Sir John Perring, 2nd Baronet (1794–1843), eldest son and heir;
- Phillip Perring;
- Elizabeth Perring;
- Jane Perring;
- Laura Perring.

== Death ==
He died at Burton Crescent in 1831, aged 65.

== Sources ==
- Collinge, J.M., biography of "Perring, John (1765–1831), of Membland, Devon and New Broad Street, London", published History of Parliament, House of Commons 1790–1820, ed. R. Thorne, 1986
- Debrett's Baronetage of England, revised, corrected and continued by George William Collen, London, 1840, p. 434, Perring Baronets
- Scarratt, Anne, The Woollen Industry of Modbury, The Modbury Group, 2005-13, details regarding the Perring family and their cloth business in Modbury

Parliament of the United Kingdom
Preceded by John Willett Willett; Manasseh Lopes	Member of Parliament for New Romney; 1806 – 1807; With: William Windham	Succeeded by The Earl of Clonmell; Hon. George Ashburnham
Preceded by Thomas Godfrey	Member of Parliament for Hythe; 1810–1820; With: William Deeds 1810–1812; Matthew White 1812–1818; John Bladen Taylor 1818–1819; Sir Robert Townsend-Farquhar 1820	Succeeded by Stewart Marjoribanks
Civic offices
Preceded by Charles Price	Lord Mayor of London; 1803–1804	Succeeded by Peter Perchard
Baronetage of the United Kingdom
New creation	Baronet (of Membland); 1808–1831	Succeeded by John Perring
