= William Deedes =

William Deedes may refer to:

- William Deedes (Hythe MP) (1761–1834), MP for Hythe
- William Deedes (East Kent MP, born 1796) (1796–1862), English cricketer, Member of Parliament (MP) for East Kent, 1845–1857 and 1857–1862
- William Deedes (East Kent MP, born 1834) (1834–1887), English cricketer, MP for East Kent, 1876–1880, son of the above
- Bill Deedes (1913–2007), British journalist and Conservative MP for Ashford, 1950–1974
