= Elizabeth Herbert, Countess of Carnarvon =

English noblewoman (1752–1826)

The Right Honourable The Countess of Carnarvon
- Countess of Carnarvon
- Born: Lady Elizabeth Alicia Maria Wyndham; 29 November 1752; England
- Baptised: 1 January 1753; St Margaret's, Westminster, England
- Died: 10 February 1826 (aged 73); Petworth, Sussex, England
- Noble family: Wyndham family
- Spouse: Henry Herbert, 1st Earl of Carnarvon (m. 1771)
- Issue: Lady Frances Herbert; Henry George Herbert, 2nd Earl of Carnarvon; Charles Herbert; William Herbert; George Herbert; Algernon Herbert
- Father: Charles Wyndham, 2nd Earl of Egremont
- Mother: Alicia Maria Carpenter
- Occupation: Lady of the Bedchamber

Elizabeth Alicia Maria Herbert, Countess of Carnarvon (née Wyndham; 29 November 1752 – 10 February 1826) was an English noblewoman and the wife of Henry Herbert, 1st Earl of Carnarvon.

She was born in November 1752 as Lady Elizabeth Wyndham, the daughter of Charles Wyndham, 2nd Earl of Egremont, and his wife, Alicia. She was baptised on New Year's Day 1753 at St Margaret's, Westminster. She married the Earl of Carnarvon on 15 July 1771, at St George's, Hanover Square, before he was raised to the peerage; he was then known as Henry Herbert, MP. She became Lady Porchester of Highclere in 1780 and a countess from 3 July 1793. In 1795 she was appointed a Lady of the Bedchamber to Caroline of Brunswick, then Princess of Wales and later, nominally, queen; she officially retained the position until Caroline's death, despite the princess's estrangement from her husband and absence from the country.

The earl and countess had six children:

- Lady Frances Herbert (died 1830), who married Thomas Reynolds-Moreton, 1st Earl of Ducie, and had children
- Henry George Herbert, 2nd Earl of Carnarvon (1772-1833), who succeeded his father in the earldom
- Hon. Charles Herbert (1774-1808), who married Hon. Bridget Augusta Byng, daughter of John Byng, 5th Viscount Torrington, and had one child
- Very Rev. Hon. William Herbert (1778-1847), who married Hon. Letitia Dorothea Allen, daughter of Joshua Allen, 5th Viscount Allen, and had children
- Rev. Hon. George Herbert (1789-1825), who married Frances Head and had children
- Hon. Algernon Herbert (1792-1855), who married Marianne Lempriere and had children

A portrait of the countess and her son was painted by Sir Joshua Reynolds. She died at Petworth, Sussex, England, aged 73.
