= Sophia Marsham, Countess of Romney =

- Countess of Romney
- Successor: Mary Elizabeth Marsham
- Full name: Sophia Pitt
- Born: Sophia Pitt
- Died: The Mote, Kent, England
- Noble family: Marsham, Pitt
- Spouses: Charles Marsham, 2nd Earl of Romney
- Issue: Lady Sophia Marsham; Charles Marsham, 3rd Earl of Romney, Lady Frances Marsham; Lady Mary Marsham; Lady Charlotte Marsham
- Father: William Morton Pitt, MP
- Mother: Margaret Gambier

Sophia Marsham, Countess of Romney (died 9 September 1812), formerly Sophia Pitt, was the first wife of Charles Marsham, 2nd Earl of Romney.

She was the only daughter of William Morton Pitt, MP (a relation of William Pitt the Elder, and his first wife, the former Margaret Gambier. She married the future earl on 9 September 1806 when he was still known as Viscount Romney. They had one son and four daughters:

- Lady Sophia Marsham (1807–1863), who married Peter Richard Hoare and had children
- Charles Marsham, 3rd Earl of Romney (1808–1874)
- Lady Frances Marsham (1809–1901), who married Maj.-Gen. Edward Charles Fletcher and had children
- Lady Mary Marsham (1811–1871), who married Henry Hoare and had children
- Lady Charlotte Marsham (1812–1879), who married Reverend George William Corker and had no children

The countess died at the family seat of the Mote, Kent, just over a week after the birth of her youngest child, Charlotte. However, it was not until 1832 that the earl re-married, his second wife being the Hon. Mary Elizabeth Townshend, daughter of John Townshend, 2nd Viscount Sydney and widow of George James Cholmondeley.

Lord Romney died in March 1845, aged 67, and was succeeded by his only son from his first marriage, Charles.

His second daughter, Lady Frances Marsham (1809–1901) married, in 1838, Major-General E. C. Fletcher (died 1877).
