= Peter Perchard =

British goldsmith and merchant

Peter Perchard (c. 1729 – 21 January 1806) was a British goldsmith and merchant who served as Lord Mayor of London in 1804.

Perchard worked as a merchant on his native island of Guernsey and the other Channel Islands. Perchard grew wealthy from privateering in the English Channel after the British government declared reprisals against the allies of the nascent United States of America. Perchard and his fellow privateers targeted ships from the French West Indies, with Perchard personally making almost £10,000 from his privateering activities.

== Civic career ==
He was created an alderman in the City of London's Candlewick ward on 12 April 1798 as a goldsmith. He was subsequently elected one of the Sheriffs of the City of London in 1793. Perchard was a liveryman of the Worshipful Company of Goldsmiths.

The election was held for the office of Lord Mayor on 9 October 1804. Perchard was one of three candidates, the others being his fellow Aldermen, James Shaw and Charles Flower. Perchard won 1781 votes to Shaw's 1652, and was duly declared Lord Mayor. In his acceptance speech, Perchard described himself as being "late of life" but said that "we cease to live when we cease to be of any use to the public".

The prisoner reformer James Neild wrote to Perchard about the poor conditions at the debtors' prison in Southwark during Perchard's time as Lord Mayor but received no reply from him.

== Personal life ==
Perchard and his wife, Martha (née Le Mesurier), were married for 18 years and had six children. Perchard's wife was from a prominent Guernsey family, her first cousin was the wealthy merchant Paul Le Mesurier, who had served as Lord Mayor of London from 1794.

Three of their children, Mary, Mathew, and Mathew-Henry, died in infancy, a second daughter, Martha, died aged 10. Perchard died only 10 weeks after the end of his Mayoralty, and was buried with his wife and four children in St Mary Abchurch, near Cannon Street in the City of London. A monument commemorates Perchard and his family in St Peter's church in his native Guernsey.

A Mr. Urban, writing to The Gentleman's Magazine in 1832 with his recollections of Perchard, said of him that "...his exterior was handsome, and he had a commanding mien, though features repulsive and prominent and well turned"

Civic offices
Preceded by John Perring	Lord Mayor of London; 1804–1805	Succeeded by James Shaw
