= Jacob Marsham =

English cleric

The Honourable Jacob Marsham

Canon of Windsor
- In office 1805-1840

Personal details
- Born: 28 February 1759
- Died: 28 January 1840 (aged 80)
- Spouse: Amelia Bullock (m. 1784)
- Parent: Robert Marsham (father)
- Relatives: Charles Marsham (brother); Robert Marsham (grandfather)
- Education: Christ Church, Oxford; King's College, Cambridge

Hon. Jacob Marsham (28 February 1759 – 28 January 1840) was an English cleric, Canon of Windsor from 1805 to 1840.

== Life ==
Marsham was born on 28 February 1759, the son of Robert Marsham, 2nd Baron Romney. He was educated at Eton College, entered Christ Church, Oxford in 1777, and then entered King's College, Cambridge in 1783, graduating M.A. in 1783 and D.D. in 1797.

Marsham was a prebendary of Bath and Wells in 1789, and prebendary of Rochester from 1797 to 1840. He was installed as rector of St Michael and All Angels' Church, Wilmington, Kent in 1800.

In 1805 Marsham was appointed canon of the twelfth stall in St George's Chapel, Windsor Castle in the place of Edward Legge who had been appointed dean.

== Family ==
Marsham married in 1784 Amelia Frances Bullock.
