= John Bladen Taylor =

English Member of Parliament

John Bladen Taylor (1764–1820), was an English army officer of the East India Company and merchant. He became an East India Company director in 1810. At the end of his life he was Member of Parliament for Hythe, in 1818–9.

== Life ==
He was the son of John Taylor of Townhead and Abbot Hall, Kendal, and his wife Dorothy Northall née Rumbold, daughter of William Rumbold and sister of Thomas Rumbold. They married in 1762, in British India. He was born in Calcutta, where at the time his father was in the East India Company Maritime Service.

Taylor was in the East India Company Madras military, from 1778, possibly to 1805. He was a cadet in 1778, rising to lieutenant in 1783. His father had died by 1787, when Abbot Hall was put up for sale. It was recorded in 1821 that Taylor was placed on half pay in 1783, with the 87th Foot (an anachronism before 1793). He was promoted to captain in 1796, major in 1799, and lieutenant-colonel in 1804, retiring from the military in 1805.

Returning to the United Kingdom, Taylor was an East India merchant, later in 1810 becoming an East India Company director as replacement on the death of William Bensley; he was re-elected in 1811 and 1816. Early in his time as director, under the influence of Charles Grant, Taylor was one of the swing votes in a decision to side with Sir George Barlow, 1st Baronet in his Madras power struggle with William Petrie. Finding that Grant failed to follow up with an investigation of Barlow, he later reversed his position.

Taylor joined in 1811 the 3rd Regiment of the Royal East India Volunteers, with rank of major. He prepared the ground at Hythe for the 1818 general election, as a nabob candidate supporting the Liverpool administration, and was successful in the two-member constituency with the Tory Sir John Perring, 1st Baronet, keeping out Matthew White and Sir John Courtenay Honywood, 5th Baronet. He was a Member of the Parliament of the United Kingdom for Hythe 1818 to May 1819.

== Family ==
Taylor married in 1808 Rachel Dunkin, daughter of Sir William Dunkin, as her second husband. The couple had one daughter, Eliza Alicia. She made a first cousin marriage in 1855 to Edmund Hugh Clerk JP (c.1818–1900) of Burford, seventh son of Major Thomas Clerk of the East India Company and his wife Dorothy Taylor, sister of John Bladen Taylor.

Rachel Dunkin's first marriage was in Bengal in 1792, to George Elliot of the Bengal Civil Service. He was a nephew of Major John Grant. William Hickey in his Memoirs gave an account of Elliot's death after a lightning strike at Monghyr (Munger). Rachel at the end of 1795 sailed back to Great Britain, taking with her the two eldest children of Francis MacNaghten and his wife Letitia, her sister.
