= Alicia Wyndham, Countess of Egremont =

English noblewoman (c.1726–1794)

The Right Honourable The Countess of Egremont
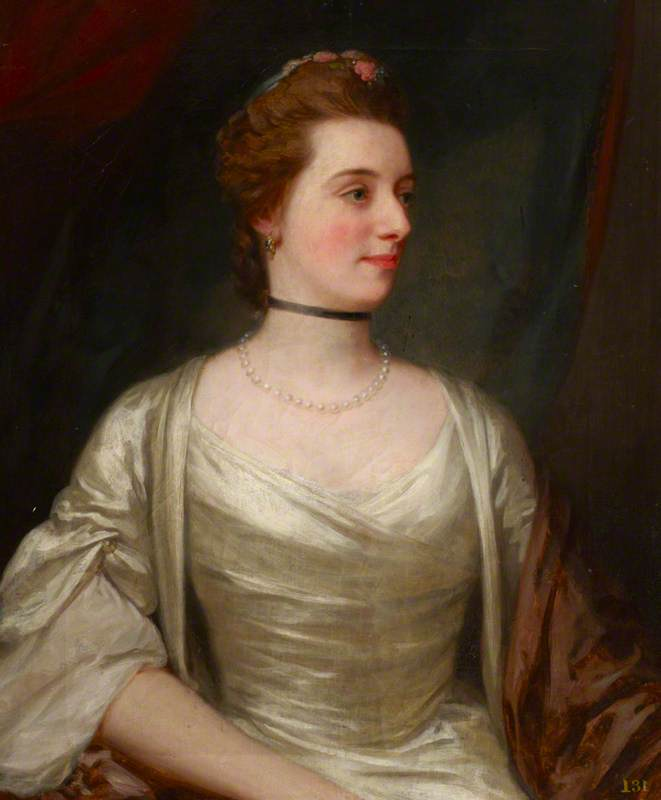
- Alicia Maria Carpenter, Countess of Egremont (Thomas Phillips)
- Born: 1726
- Died: 1 June 1794 (aged 67–68)
- Spouse: Charles Wyndham, 2nd Earl of Egremont
- Issue: 6
- Father: George Carpenter, 2nd Baron Carpenter
- Mother: Elizabeth Petty

Alicia Wyndham, Countess of Egremont (c. 1726 – 1 June 1794), formerly the Hon. Alicia Maria Carpenter, was the wife of Charles Wyndham, 2nd Earl of Egremont.

She was the daughter of George Carpenter, 2nd Baron Carpenter of Killaghy, a soldier and MP, and his wife, the former Elizabeth Petty. Her brother, George, became Earl of Tyrconnell.

Alicia married the earl on 12 March 1750.

The earl and countess had six children:

- George O'Brien Wyndham (1751–1837), who succeeded his father in the earldom;
- Lady Elizabeth Alicia Maria Wyndham (1752–1826), who married Henry Herbert, 1st Earl of Carnarvon, and had children;
- Lady Frances Wyndham (1755–1795), who married Charles Marsham, 1st Earl of Romney, and had children;
- Hon. Percy Charles Wyndham (1757–1833), who died unmarried;
- Hon. Charles William Wyndham (1760–1828), who married Lady Anne Barbara Frances Villiers and had no children;
- Hon. William Frederick Wyndham (1763–1828), who married Frances Mary Harford, daughter of Frederick Calvert, 6th Baron Baltimore, and had children; his second wife was Julia de Smorzewska, Countess de Spyterki, by whom he also had children.

In 1761 she became the first Lady of the Bedchamber to Charlotte of Mecklenburg-Strelitz, queen consort of King George III; she remained in the queen's household until her death in 1794.

On 6 June 1767, following the death of her first husband, she married Count Hans Moritz von Brühl. They had one child, Harriet Brühl, who died in 1853. Harriet married Hugh Scott, 6th Lord Polwarth, and had children (including Henry Hepburne-Scott, 7th Lord Polwarth).
