= Frances Marsham, Lady Romney =

English noble (1755–1795)

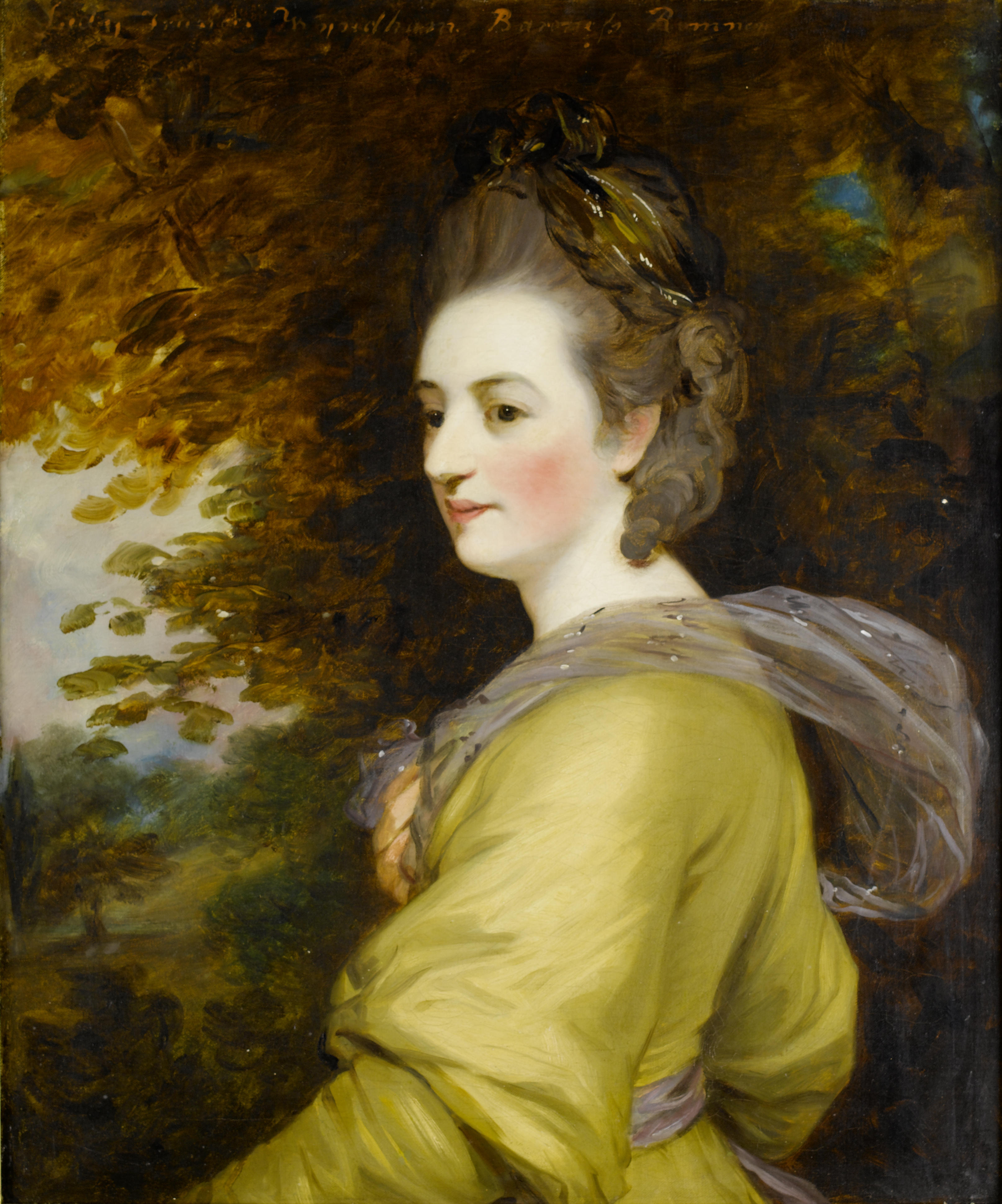
Lady Frances Wyndham (John Hoppner)

Frances Marsham, Lady Romney (9 July 1755 – 15 January 1795), formerly Lady Frances Wyndham, was the wife of British politician Charles Marsham, 1st Earl of Romney. Although occasionally referred to as "Countess of Romney", she died before her husband was raised to the earldom in 1801.

She was born at Petworth, England, the daughter of Charles Wyndham, 2nd Earl of Egremont, and his wife, the former Hon. Alicia Maria Carpenter, who was herself the daughter of George Carpenter, 2nd Baron Carpenter of Killaghy.

She married the earl on 30 August 1776, when he was the Hon. Charles Marsham, heir to Robert Marsham, 2nd Baron Romney. He was created Earl of Romney in 1801, a few years after his wife's death. They had three daughters and a son:

- Charles Marsham, 2nd Earl of Romney (1777–1845)
- Lady Frances Marsham (1778–1868), who married Sir John Buchanan Riddell of that Ilk, 9th Baronet, and had children.
- Harriet
- Amelia Charlotte (born 1782)

The couple had a seat at The Mote, Kent, where Lady Romney was responsible for laying out the grounds. She was said to have "a remarkably fine taste in landscape scenery and horticulture", but died before the work was completed.

Lord Romney died in March 1811, aged 66, and was succeeded in the earldom by their only son, Charles.

A portrait of Frances was painted by Sir Joshua Reynolds in the year of her marriage. It was for a time owned by Michael Arthur Bass, 1st Baron Burton.
