= Sir Charles Farnaby-Radcliffe, 3rd Baronet =

Sir Charles Farnaby-Radcliffe, 3rd Baronet (c. 1740–1798) was a British politician who sat in the House of Commons for 33 years between 1765 and 1798.

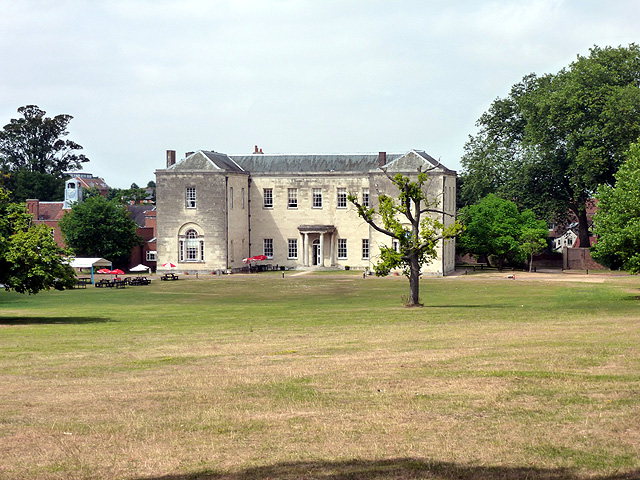
Hitchin Priory, now a hotel

Farnaby was the eldest son of Sir Thomas Farnaby, 2nd Baronet and his wife Mary Lloyd, daughter of Rev. Montagu Lloyd. He was probably educated at Eton College from 1747 to 1754. He succeeded his father in the baronetcy on 24 March 1760. He married Penelope Charlton, widow of Richard Charlton, a London merchant, and daughter of John Radcliffe of Hitchin Priory, Hertfordshire on 12 August 1762. When his brother-in-law John Radcliffe died in 1783 his wife succeeded to his property including Hitchin Priory and Farnaby assumed the additional name of Radcliffe 1784.

Farnaby was returned as Member of Parliament for East Grinstead on the interest of Lord George Sackville at a by-election on 30 December 1765. At the 1768 general election he and Sackville were both defeated at Hythe. Farnaby was returned unopposed for Kent at a by-election on 15 February 1769. He was then returned for Hythe with ministerial support at the 1774 general election and again in 1780 and 1784 topping the poll each time.

Farnaby-Ratcliffe's estates in Kent gave him a powerful influence and he was returned without a contest for Hythe in 1790 and 1796. He is not known to have spoken in Parliament during his time there.

Farnaby died of a lingering illness in October 1798 and was buried at Hitchin on the 20 October.

Parliament of Great Britain
| Preceded by The Earl of Middlesex; John Irwin | Member of Parliament for East Grinstead; 1765–1768; With: John Irwin | Succeeded by Lord George Sackville; John Irwin |
| Preceded by Sir Brook Bridges; John Frederick Sackville | Member of Parliament for Kent; 1769–1774; With: Sir Brook Bridges | Succeeded by Hon. Charles Marsham; Thomas Knight, junior |
| Preceded by John Sawbridge; William Evelyn | Member of Parliament for Hythe; 1774–1798; With: William Evelyn | Succeeded by Hon. Charles Marsham; William Evelyn |
Baronetage of Great Britain
| Preceded by Thomas Farnaby | Baronet (of Keppington); 1760-1798 | Succeeded by John Farnaby |
