= Mote Park =

Park in Kent, United Kingdom

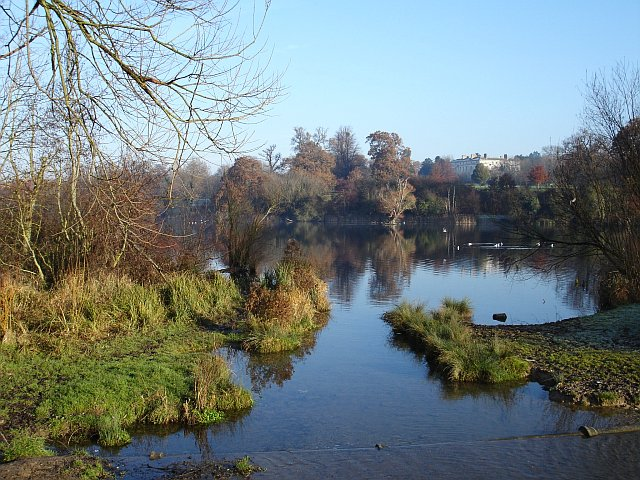
- Mote Park lake with Mote House in the distance
- Interactive map of Mote Park
- Type: Public park
- Location: Maidstone, Kent
- Coordinates: 51°15′53″N 0°32′47″E
- Area: 440-acre (20 km2)
- Operator: Maidstone Borough Council
- Status: Open year round

Mote Park is a 440-acre (1.8 km^{2}) multi-use public park in Maidstone, Kent. Previously a country estate it was converted to landscaped park land at the end of the 18th century before becoming a municipal park. It includes the former stately home Mote House together with a miniature railway and a boating lake. A ground of the same name within the park has also been used as a first-class cricket ground by Kent County Cricket Club.

The house is set in a 450 acres (1.8 km^{2}) park maintained by Maidstone Borough Council with support from the Mote Park Fellowship, a group of volunteers.

== History ==
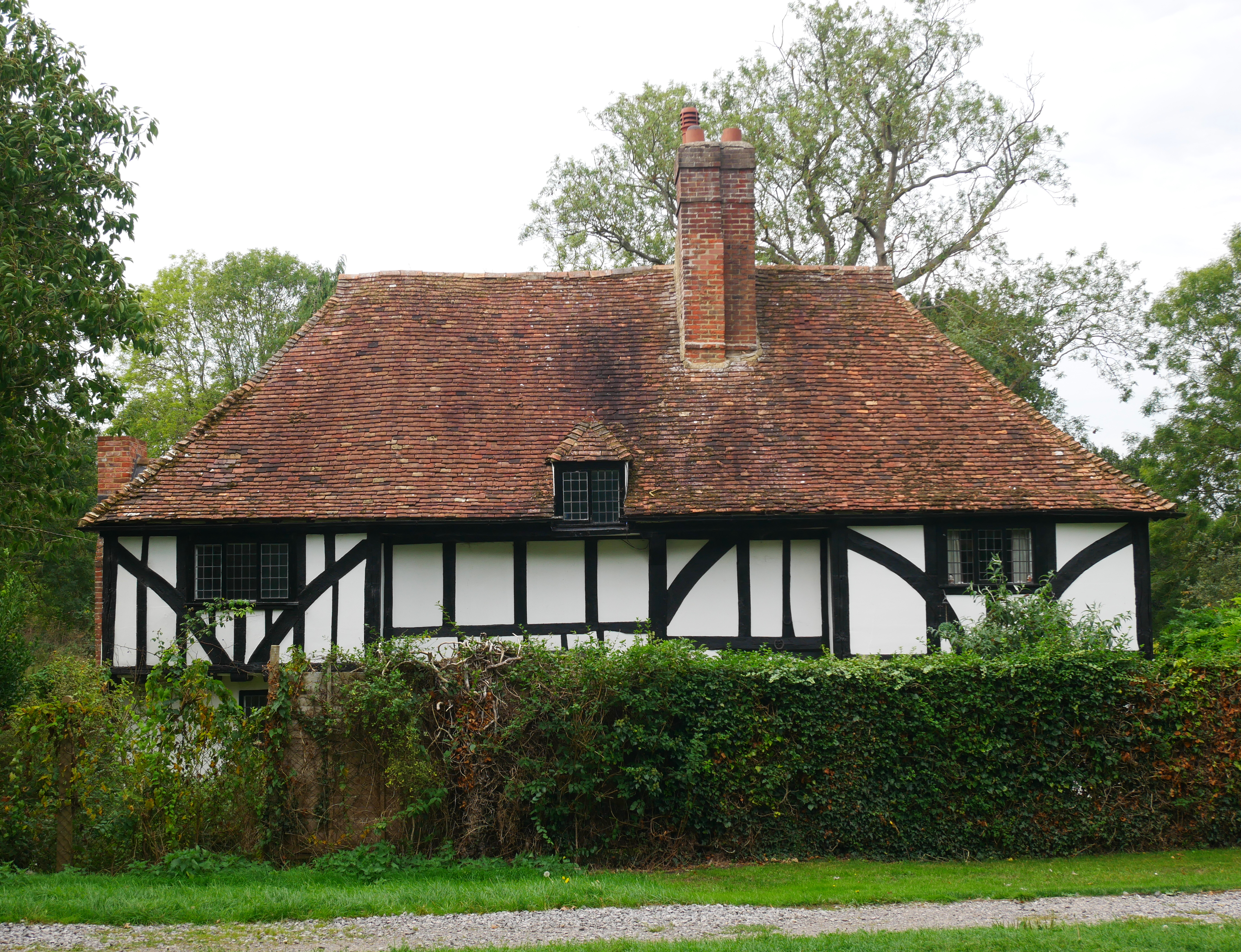
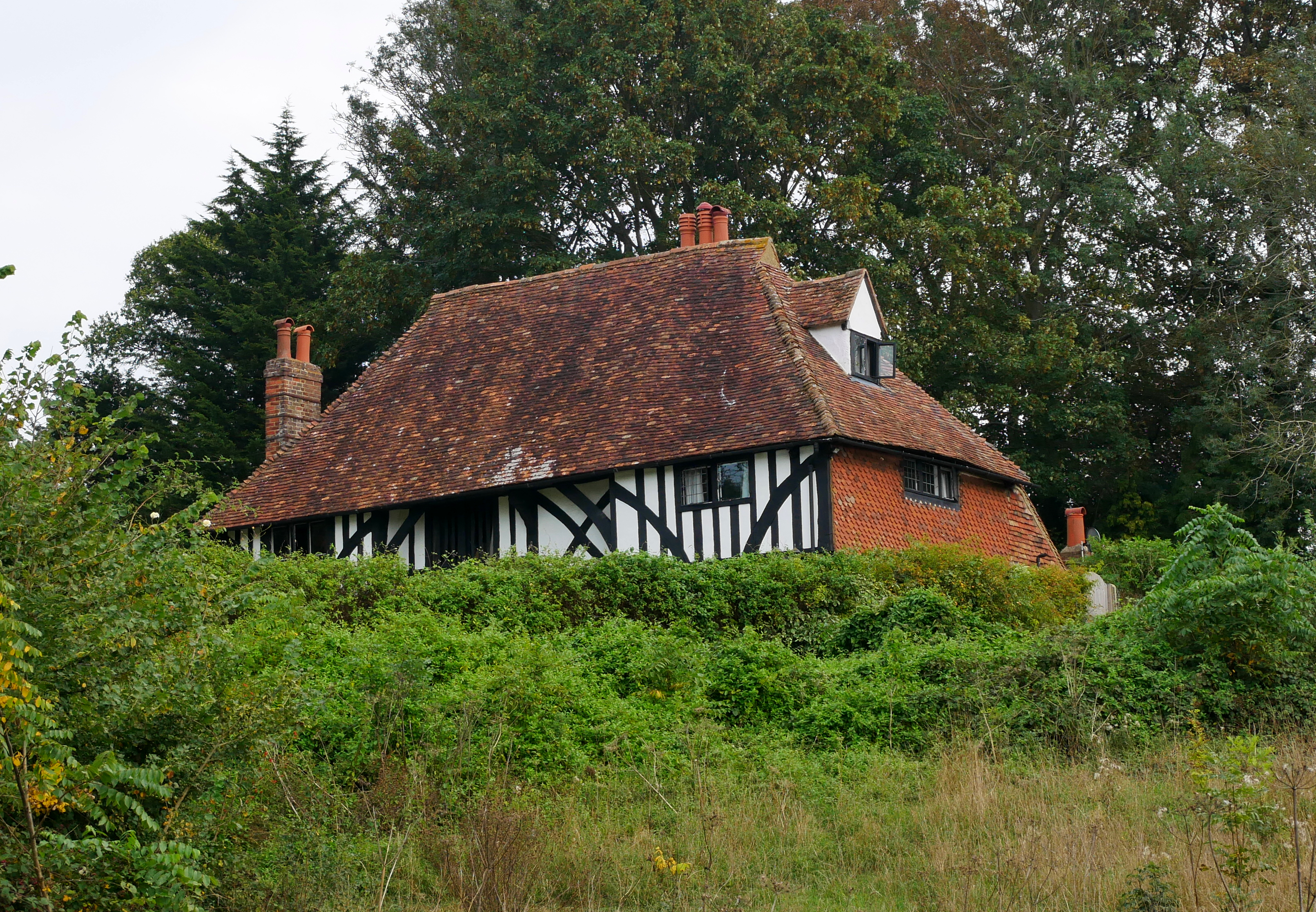
The fifteenth-century timber-framed Keeper's Cottage (left) stands in the southern part of the park; the fifteenth or sixteenth-century Old Brewhouse (right) is on its eastern edges

The park's name is derived from 'moot' or 'mote' in Old English meaning "a place of assembly". Its proximity to nearby Penenden Heath (the site of shire moots during the Middle Ages) indicates that it may once have formed part of an administrative region in central Kent.

In the 13th century, the "mote" lands were incorporated into the manor of local landowners and a manor house in the area of the present-day park is described as being castellated (or fortified) with emparked grounds. This is believed to indicate the area was used as one of the earliest deer parks in Kent.

The park is incorporated into royal history as a possession of King Edward IV's consort, Elizabeth Woodville (daughter of Richard Woodville, 1st Earl Rivers) and was later raided by Richard Neville, 16th Earl of Warwick angered by the King's marriage. The Woodville family continued to lay claim to the land despite various interventions during the reign of Richard III and Henry VII. On 17 July 1531, Henry VIII and Anne Boleyn visited it, before their marriage. Passing to Thomas Wyatt the younger, the estate again returned to the Crown under Queen Elizabeth I before finally passing, in 1690 to the Marsham family, who would later become the Lords Romney.

Under the ownership of the Marsham family, the estate was considerably improved. The grounds were laid out in the so-called Anglo-Dutch style illustrated in an engraving by Johannes Kip in 1750. Frances Marsham, Lady Romney, was instrumental in redesigning the grounds prior to her death in 1795.

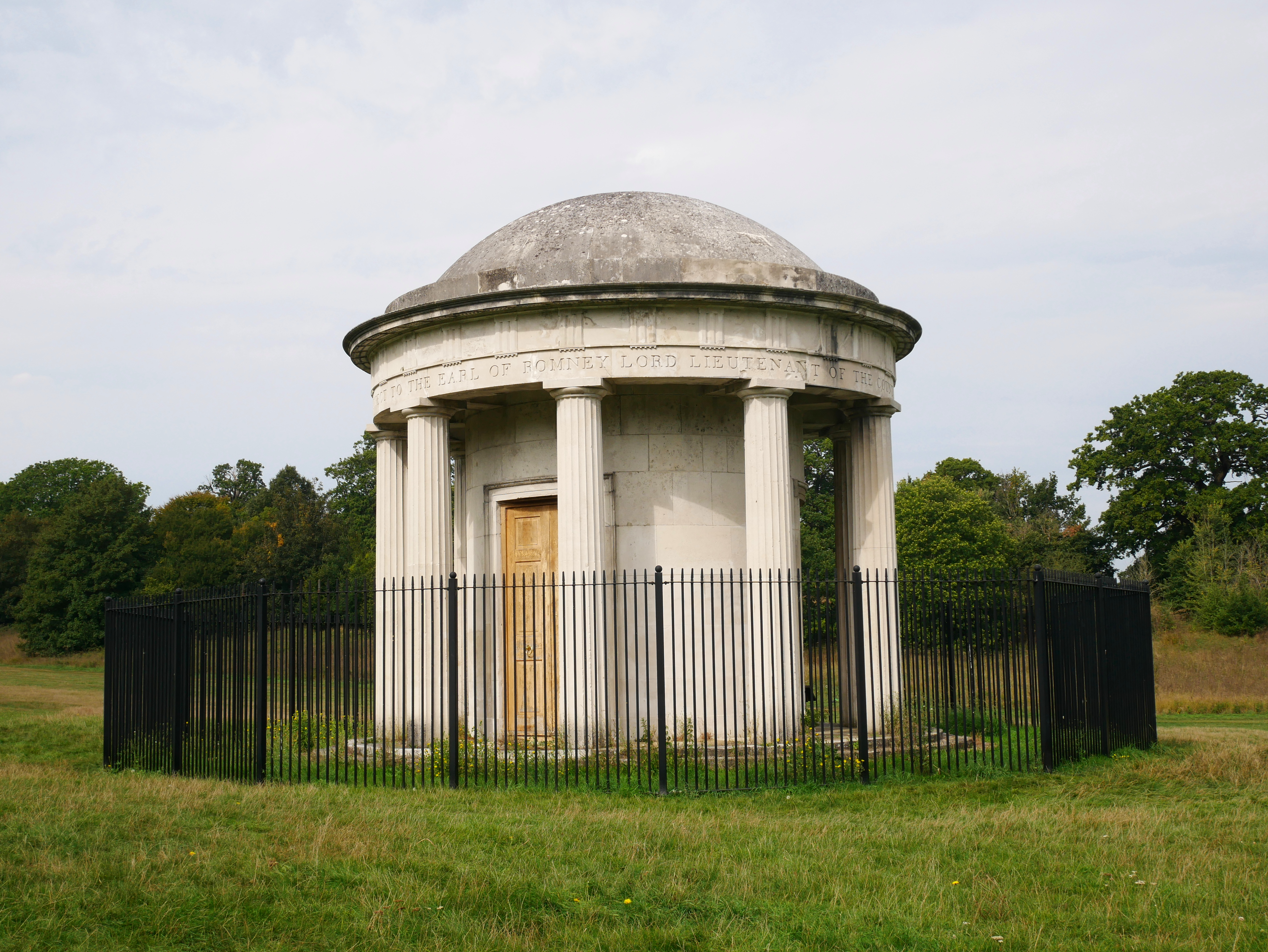
Volunteers Pavilion Doric Temple, erected in the early nineteenth century

On Thursday, August the 1st, 1799, King George III and Prime Minister William Pitt visited the property to inspect around 3,000 assembled troops of the Kent Volunteers, a local militia trained to defend the county from a possible invasion by Napoleon I of France. The event was organised by Lord Romney, Lord-Lieutenant of Kent. The royal party included the Prince of Wales, the Duke of Cumberland and Duke of Gloucester, the Queen, with Princess Augusta and Princess Elizabeth, attended by Lady Harrington. A Doric-style temple was constructed to commemorate the occasion.

Between 1793 and 1800 the original Mote House was demolished and a new mansion constructed, designed by Daniel Asher Alexander. At the same time the River Len was dammed to form a lake. The addition of internal roadways, walls, a boathouse and a bridge (the 'Great Bridge') over the lake stretched the financial resources of Charles Marsham, 3rd Baron Romney. Eventually the family gathered enough funds to expand the property and the park reached the size it is today, approximately 180 hectares (440 acres). The Great Bridge was demolished and the lake itself expanded to around 30 acres (120,000 m^{2}).

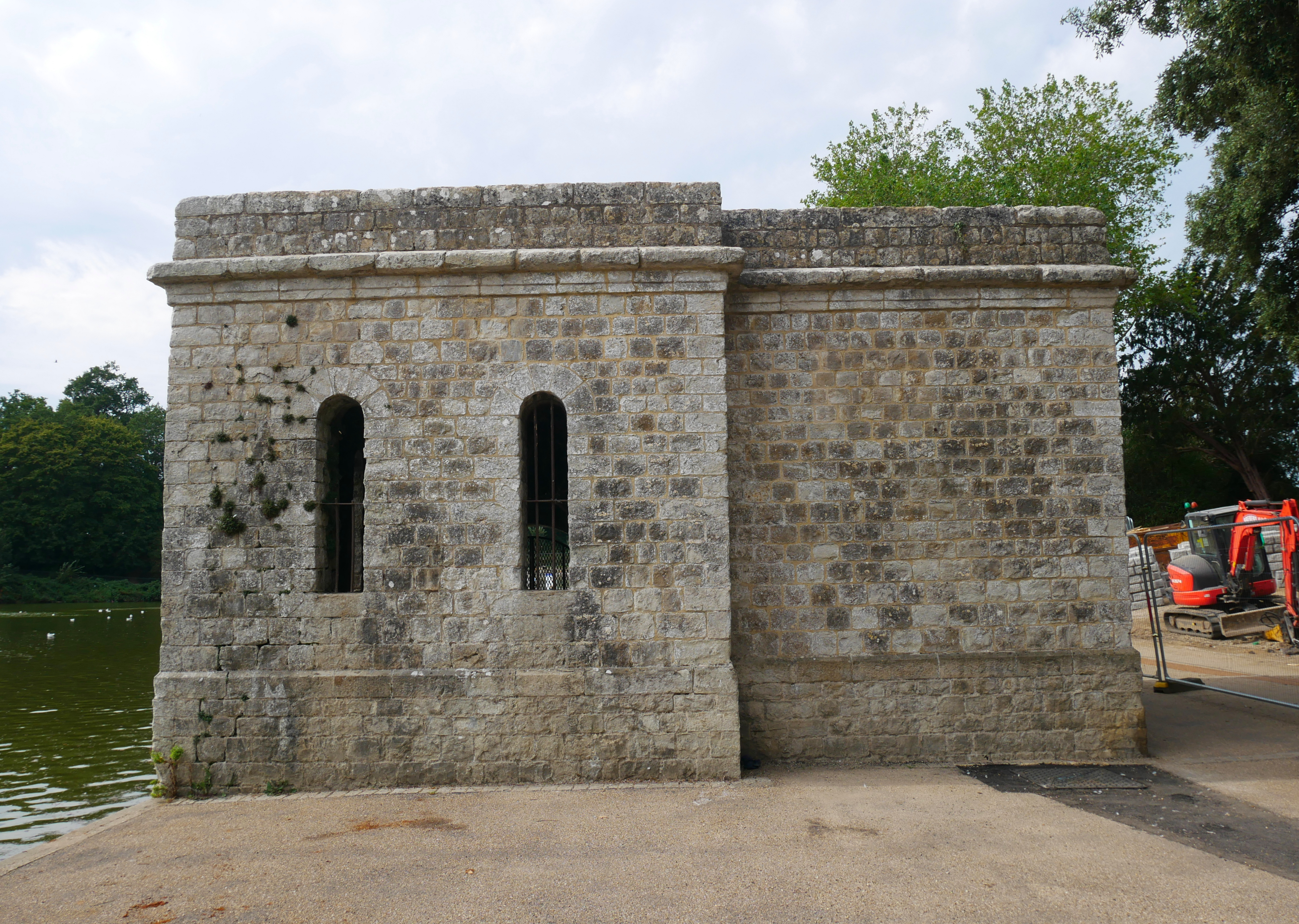
The nineteenth-century boathouse located on the north side of the lake in Mote Park

At the peak of its opulence in 1888 an article in the Gardener's Chronicle described extensive gardens, exotic plants and a walled kitchen garden including orangeries, vineries and peach houses, staffed by 25 gardeners.

In 1895 the estate was sold to Marcus Samuel, 1st Viscount Bearsted. The estate had included the Mote Cricket Club since 1857, and Viscount Bearsted expanded the facility, building a pavilion between 1908 and 1910. (see below).

In 1929 Walter Samuel, 2nd Viscount Bearsted sold the majority of the estate to Maidstone Borough Council (then the Maidstone Corporation) for £50,000 and converted the house to an orphanage. The family still retains an interest in the park today.

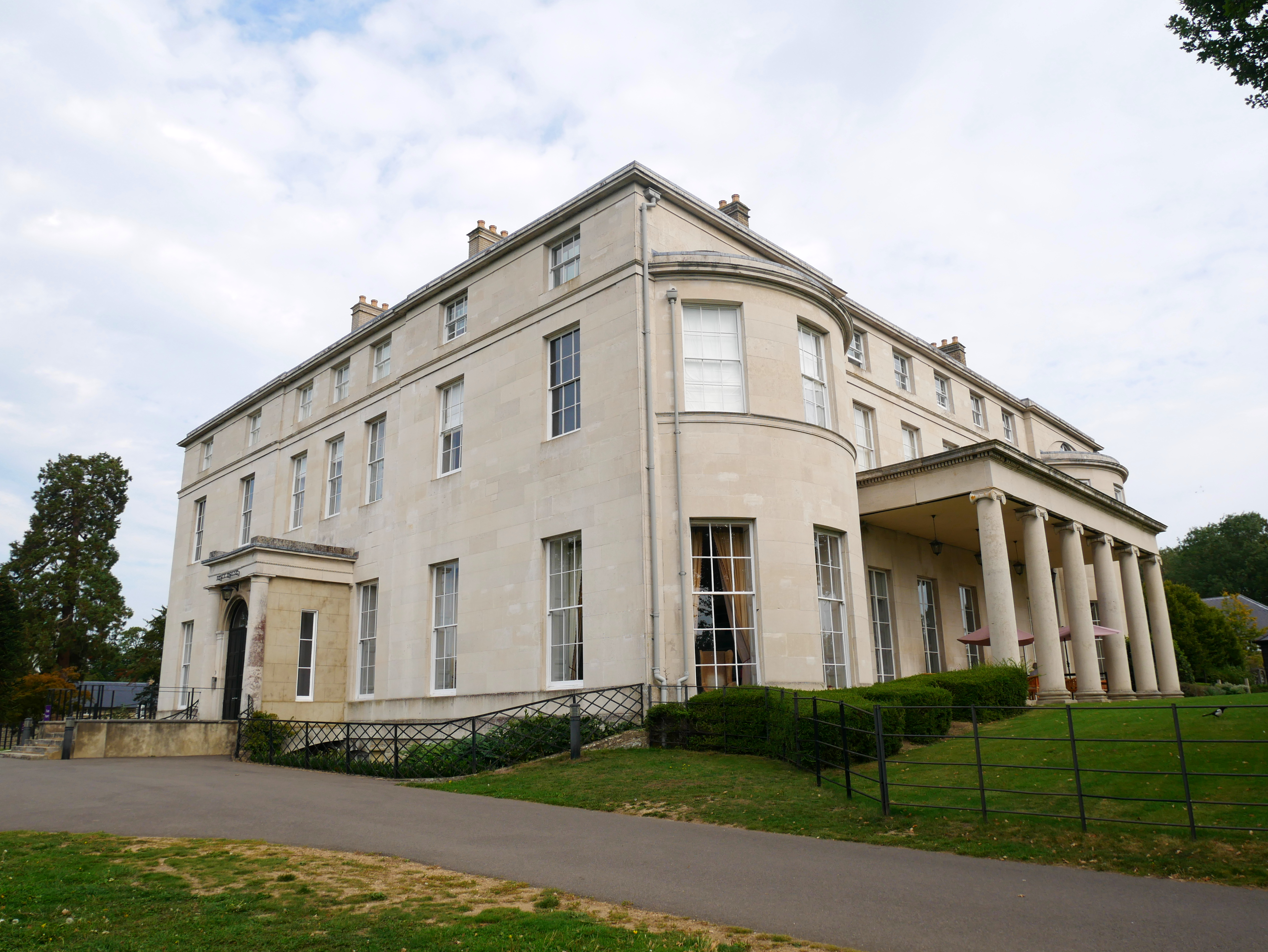
Mote House from the southwest

Between 1932 and 1941, Mote House (known then as "The Mote") was home to the Caldecott Community (now the Caldecott Foundation), a nursery organisation that had relocated to Maidstone from its original home in London following the First World War.

In 1941, war forced the Caldecott Community to evacuate to Hyde House in Dorset. Mote House was commandeered by the British Armed Forces who used the kitchen garden as a headquarters and training facility during the Second World War. The Mote / Mote House was subsequently used as offices for the Ministry of Agriculture, Fisheries and Food before becoming a Cheshire Homes care home for the disabled. After lying empty for a number of years it was redeveloped (along with its outbuildings) as retirement apartments and cottages.

The park itself was remodelled following its purchase in the 1930s and now contains a number of recreation facilities (see below). It was also used as a venue for the annual Kent County Show between 1946 and 1963. Being central to the town, much of the population was able to walk to and from the Show which was held in mid-July each year.

The park is registered at Grade II on the English Heritage Register of Historic Parks and Gardens. Mote House itself is a Grade II* listed building incorporating historic outbuildings including the Grade II listed stables.

The park also hosted Radio 1's Big Weekend (a music festival) on 10–11 May 2008.

In 2011, it was announced that the parkland would undergo a major conservation and improvement project. Lost historic views were to be recreated as part of a £2.5m scheme. The work was financed by a £1.8 million grant jointly from the Heritage Lottery Fund (HLF) and the Big Lottery Fund (BIG) under its Parks for People Scheme, and an additional £700,000 Maidstone Borough Council. In February 2011, scrubland was due to be cleared and 140 new parkland trees planted including alder, birch, hornbeam, sweet chestnut, beech, oak, redwood and lime. Historic views like that between the Volunteers Pavilion and Mote will be reinstated by the removing poorer quality trees. Kent Wildlife Trust is collaborating on the project to ensure the ecology of the park is protected. The project was completed in the summer of 2012.

In 2013 the park was awarded a Green Flag Award recognising high standards in park maintenance and management. In a subsequent public vote open to those parks awarded green flags, Mote Park was named third most popular nationally behind only Margam Country Park in south Wales and Victoria Park, London from a field of 1,448 qualifying open spaces.

== Cricket ground ==
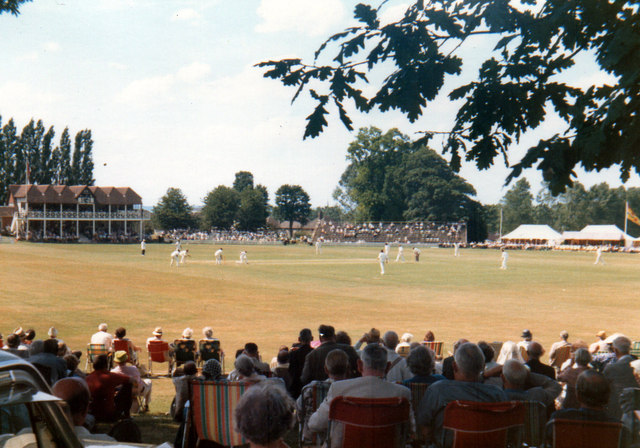
Kent v Surrey at Mote Park in 1973

Mote Park Cricket Ground is owned by The Mote Cricket Club and is also used by Maidstone rugby club. Up until 2005, it was used annually by Kent County Cricket Club as one of their out-grounds. After 140 consecutive years of play, Mote Park was taken off the list of county grounds used after a low scoring game that ended in under two days incurred a points deduction from the England and Wales Cricket Board. The facilities had only months before been approved for redevelopment as part of a larger scheme to increase the profile of cricket in the county town.

Since that time, The Mote Cricket Club have relaid a number of wickets at a cost of £14,000 with the help of grants and technical assistance from the county cricket club and Maidstone Borough Council.

== Facilities ==
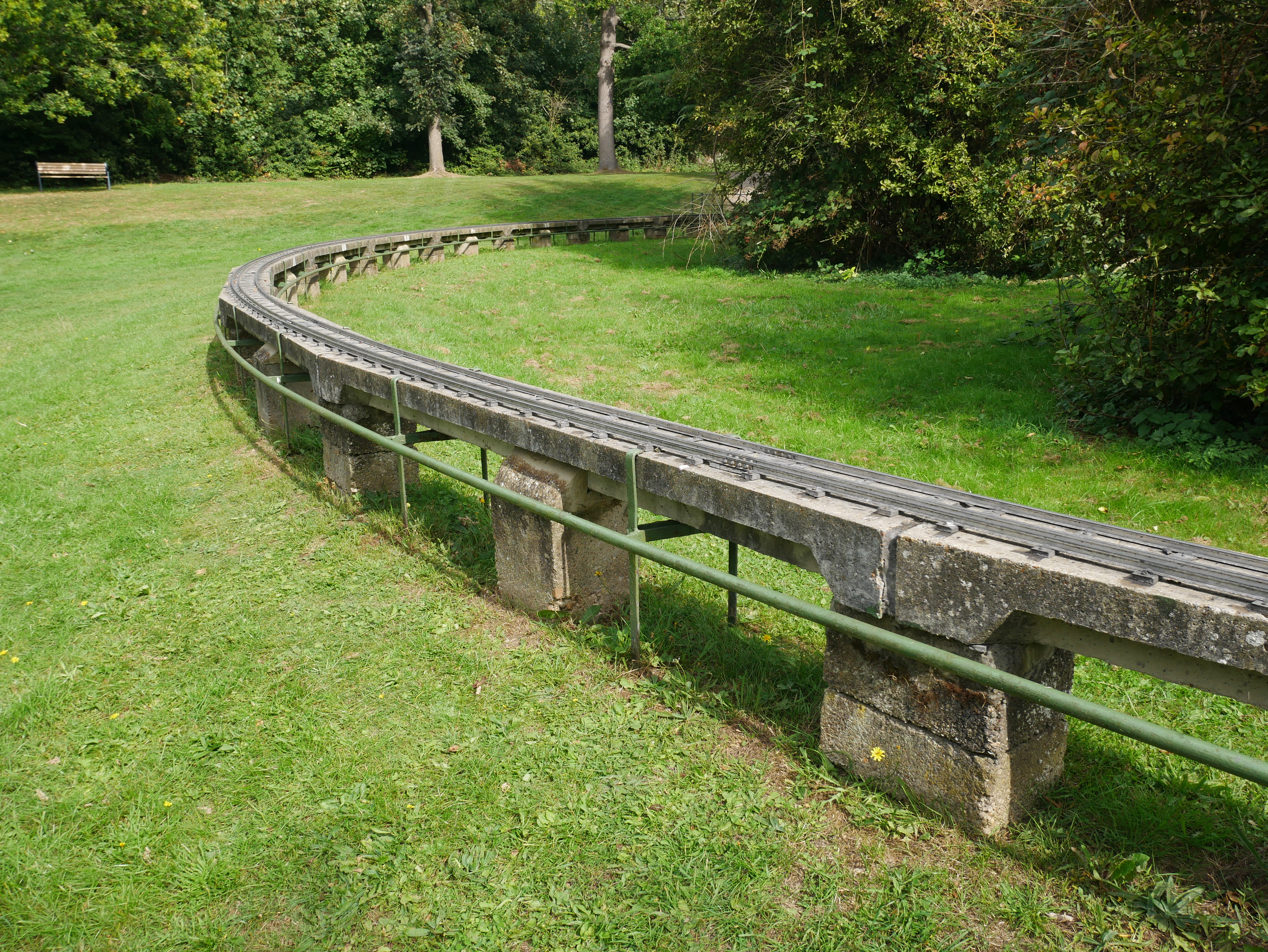
The miniature railway run by the Maidstone Model Engineering Society is located in the north of the park

- Three car parks
- Public Toilets
- Adventure play-zone
- Maidstone Leisure Centre
- Miniature railway - Maidstone Model Engineering Society
- Cafeteria
- Angling club
- Sailing club
- Association football pitches
- Rugby pitches
- Cricket ground
- Cycling routes
- BMX Track
- Skate Park
- Squash club
- Disused tether car racing track
