= Farnaby baronets =

Title in the Baronetage of Great Britain

Escutcheon of the Farnaby baronets of Keppington

The Farnaby, later Farnaby-Radcliffe, later Farnaby baronetcy, of Keppington in the County of Kent, was a title in the Baronetage of Great Britain. It was created on 21 July 1726 for Sir Charles Farnaby, a descendant of Thomas Farnaby. The third Baronet married Penelope, sister and heiress of John Radcliffe, of Hitchen Priory. On his marriage he assumed the additional surname of Radcliffe. Farnaby-Radcliffe sat as member of parliament for East Grinstead, Kent and Hythe. He died childless and was succeeded by his younger brother, the fourth Baronet. The title became extinct on the death of the latter's son, the fifth Baronet, in 1859.

== Farnaby, later Farnaby-Radcliffe, later Farnaby baronets, of Keppington (1726) ==
- Sir Charles Farnaby, 1st Baronet (1674–1741)
- Sir Thomas Farnaby, 2nd Baronet (c. 1708–1760)
- Sir Charles Farnaby-Radcliffe, 3rd Baronet (c. 1740–1798)
- Sir John Farnaby, 4th Baronet (1743–1802)
- Sir Charles Francis Farnaby, 5th Baronet (1787–1859)

Baronetage of Great Britain
Preceded by Fermor baronets	Farnaby baronets of Keppington; 21 July 1726	Succeeded by Hill baronets
