= Charles Wyndham, 2nd Earl of Egremont =

British statesman (1710–1763)

The Right Honourable The Earl of Egremont PC
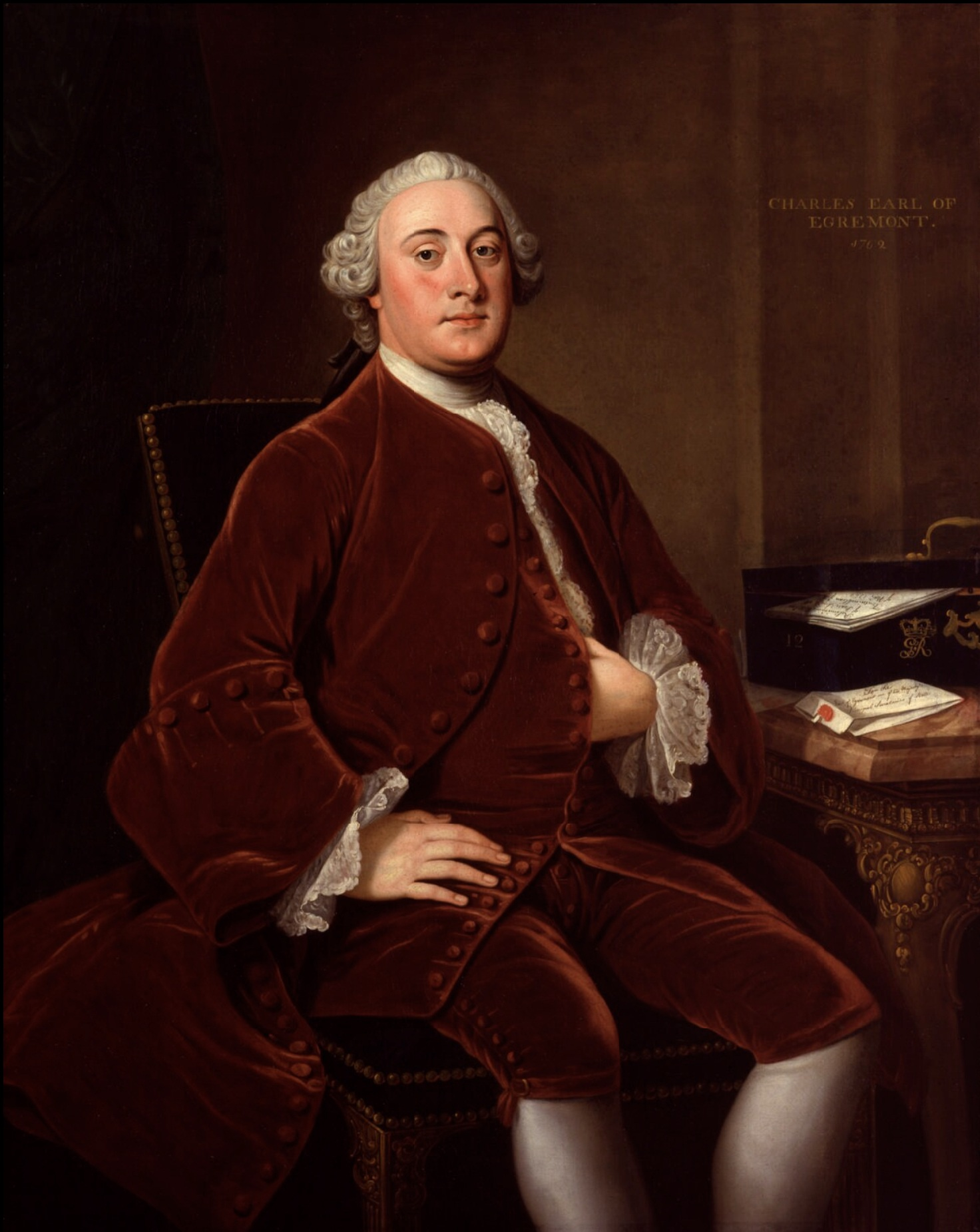
- Portrait by William Hoare, 1762

Secretary of State for the Southern Department
- In office 9 October 1761 – 21 August 1763
- Monarch: George III
- Prime Minister: The Earl of Bute; George Grenville
- Preceded by: William Pitt
- Succeeded by: The Earl of Halifax

Personal details
- Born: 19 August 1710
- Died: 21 August 1763 (aged 53)
- Spouse: Hon. Alicia Maria Carpenter
- Children: George; Elizabeth; Frances; Percy; Charles; William
- Parent(s): Sir William Wyndham, 3rd Baronet; Catherine Seymour

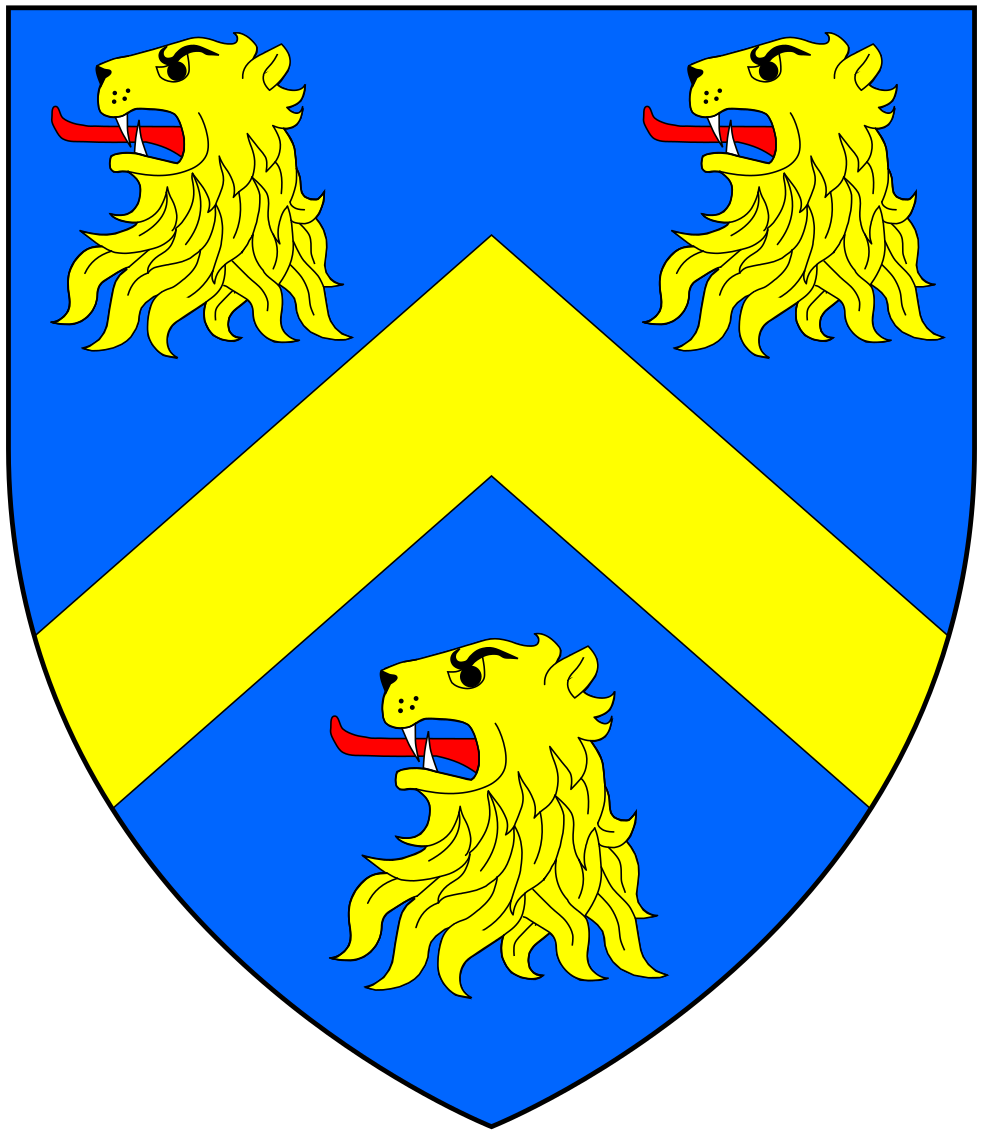
Arms of Wyndham: Azure, a chevron between three lion's heads erased or

Charles Wyndham, 2nd Earl of Egremont, PC (19 August 1710 – 21 August 1763), of Orchard Wyndham in Somerset, Petworth House in Sussex, and of Egremont House in Mayfair, London, was a British statesman who served as Secretary of State for the Southern Department from 1761 to 1763.

== Origins and early life ==
Wyndham was the eldest son and heir of Sir William Wyndham, 3rd Baronet, of Orchard Wyndham, Secretary at War in 1712, Chancellor of the Exchequer in 1713 and Tory leader in the House of Commons during the reign of King George I (1714–1727) and during the early years of King George II (1727–1760).

His mother was Catherine Seymour, daughter of Charles Seymour, 6th Duke of Somerset, and sister of Algernon Seymour, 7th Duke of Somerset, created in 1749 Earl of Egremont and Baron Cockermouth, with special remainder to his nephew Charles Wyndham, the subject of this article.

His younger brother was Percy Wyndham-O'Brien, 1st Earl of Thomond, created Earl of Thomond, having become the chosen heir of his mother's sister's childless husband, Henry O'Brien, 8th Earl of Thomond (1688–1741).

Wyndham was educated at Westminster School and Christ Church, Oxford, matriculating in 1725. In 1727, he undertook the Grand Tour with his tutor, Mr Campbell, and spent the first two years studying at an academy in Paris. He then travelled in France and Italy with Benjamin Bathurst. In 1730 he was in Rome, and in April that year he wrote to his father to inform him that he was taking "all precautions" to avoid contact with the Old Pretender and his exiled Jacobite courtiers.

== Inheritance ==
He succeeded to the Orchard Wyndham estates and as 4th baronet on his father's death in 1740, and in 1750 succeeded by special remainder as 2nd Earl of Egremont, on the death of his maternal uncle Algernon Seymour, 7th Duke of Somerset, 1st Earl of Egremont, and received, as his share of the Seymour inheritance, the former Percy estates, including Egremont Castle in Cumbria, Leconfield Castle in Yorkshire and the palatial Petworth House in Sussex (rebuilt by the 6th Duke). These were formerly owned by the Percy family, and had been inherited by the 7th Duke of Somerset via his mother, Lady Elizabeth Percy (died 1722), daughter and heiress of Joceline Percy, 11th Earl of Northumberland.

== Career ==
Wyndham served as member of parliament for Bridgwater (Somerset) in 1734–1741, Appleby (Cumberland) in 1741–1747, and for Taunton (Somerset) in 1747–1750.

=== Seven Years' War ===
In October 1761, Egremont was appointed Secretary of State for the Southern Department in succession to William Pitt, 1st Earl of Chatham. His term of office, during which he acted in concert with his brother-in-law George Grenville, was mainly occupied with the declaration of war on Spain and with the negotiations for peace with France and Spain, the terms of which Wyndham seems to have disliked. He was also involved with the proceedings against John Wilkes. He died in office 21 August 1763.

He was Lord Lieutenant of Cumberland 1751–1763 and Lord Lieutenant of Sussex 1762–1763.

== Marriage and issue ==
On 12 March 1750/51, Wyndham married Hon. Alicia Maria Carpenter, a daughter of George Carpenter, 2nd Baron Carpenter of Killaghy, by his wife Elizabeth Petty. He had progeny including:

- George O'Brien Wyndham (1751–1837), succeeded as 3rd Earl of Egremont.
- Lady Elizabeth Alicia Maria Wyndham (1752–1826), who married Henry Herbert, 1st Earl of Carnarvon, and had children.
- Lady Frances Wyndham (1755–1795), who married Charles Marsham, later Earl of Romney, and had children.
- Lady Charlotte Catherine Wyndham (5 September 1756 – April 1757).
- Hon. Percy Charles Wyndham (27 September 1757 – 5 August 1833).
- Hon. Charles William Wyndham (1760 – 1828)
- Hon. William Frederick Wyndham (1763–1828), who married Hon. Frances Mary Harford, daughter of Frederick Calvert, 6th Baron Baltimore, and had children; his second wife was Julia de Smorzewska, Countess de Spyterki, by whom he also had children.

== Assessment ==
According to the Encyclopædia Britannica Eleventh Edition, Horace Walpole perhaps rated Egremont's talents too low when he said he had neither knowledge of business, nor the smallest share of parliamentary abilities.

Parliament of Great Britain
Preceded by George Dodington; Thomas Palmer	Member of Parliament for Bridgwater; 1735–1741; With: George Dodington	Succeeded by George Dodington; Vere Poulett
Preceded by Sir John Ramsden, Bt; George Dodington	Member of Parliament for Appleby; 1742–1747; With: Sir John Ramsden, Bt	Succeeded by Sir John Ramsden, Bt; Randle Wilbraham
Preceded by Sir John Chapman, Bt; Percy Wyndham-O'Brien	Member of Parliament for Taunton; 1747–1750; With: Robert Webb	Succeeded by Robert Webb; William Rowley
Political offices
Preceded by William Pitt	Secretary of State for the Southern Department; 1761–1763	Succeeded by The Earl of Halifax
Preceded by The Duke of Newcastle	Leader of the House of Lords; 1762–1763	Succeeded by The Earl of Halifax
Honorary titles
Preceded by The Viscount Lonsdale	Lord Lieutenant of Cumberland; 1751–1759	Succeeded by Sir James Lowther, 5th Bt
Preceded by The Viscount Lonsdale	Custos Rotulorum of Cumberland; 1751–1763	Vacant Title next held by Sir James Lowther, 5th Bt
Preceded by Sir James Lowther, 4th Bt	Vice-Admiral of Cumberland; 1755–1763	Vacant Title next held by Sir James Lowther, 5th Bt
Preceded by The Duke of Newcastle	Lord Lieutenant of Sussex; 1763	Succeeded by The Duke of Richmond
Peerage of Great Britain
Preceded by Algernon Seymour	Earl of Egremont; 1750–1763	Succeeded by George Wyndham
Baronetage of England
Preceded by William Wyndham	Baronet (of Orchard Wyndham); 1740–1763	Succeeded by George Wyndham
