= Farnaby =

Farnaby is a surname. Notable people with the surname include:

- Giles Farnaby (c. 1563–1640), English composer and virginalist of the Renaissance period
- Simon Farnaby (born 1975), English actor and comedian
- Thomas Farnaby (or Farnabie; c. 1575–1647) English schoolmaster and scholar
