= Robert Marsham, 2nd Baron Romney =

British peer and patron of the arts

Robert Marsham, 2nd Baron Romney FRS FSA
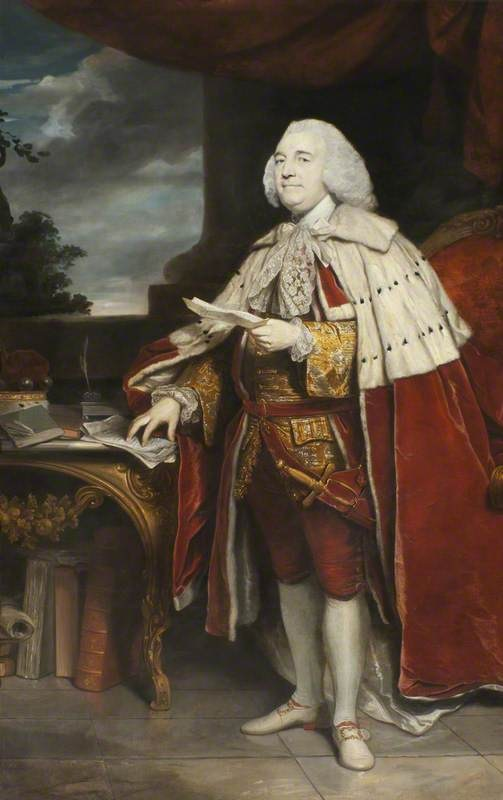
- Robert Marsham, 2nd Baron Romney, portrait by Joshua Reynolds

President of the Society for the Encouragement of Arts, Manufactures and Commerce
- In office 1761-1793

Personal details
- Born: 22 August 1712
- Died: 16 November 1793 (aged 81)
- Spouse: Priscilla Pym (m. 1742; died 1771)
- Children: 10, including Charles and Jacob
- Parent: Robert Marsham (father)
- Relatives: Robert Marsham (grandfather); Cloudesley Shovell (grandfather)
- Education: Christ Church, Oxford
- Military career
- Rank: Colonel
- Unit: West Kent Militia

Robert Marsham, 2nd Baron Romney FRS FSA (22 August 1712 – 16 November 1793) was a British peer and patron of the arts.

== Biography ==
Lord Romney was the son of Robert Marsham, 1st Baron Romney and his wife Elizabeth Shovell, daughter of Admiral Sir Cloudesley Shovell. He was educated at Christ Church, Oxford, matriculating in 1731 aged 18, graduating D.C.L. in 1733.

Lord Romney was a founding member of the Society for the Encouragement of Arts, Manufactures and Commerce (which later evolved into the Royal Society of Arts). He was elected First Vice-President of the Society in 1758. On the death of Lord Folkestone in 1761, Lord Romney was elected President, and was re-elected every year until his death in 1793.

He became a Fellow of the Royal Society in 1757, Colonel of the West Kent Militia in 1759, President of The Marine Society 1756–1793, and a Fellow of the Society of Antiquaries of London in 1762.

He died on 16 November 1793, and was buried in All Saints Church, Maidstone.

== Family ==
On 29 July 1742, Lord Romney married Priscilla Pym (1724–1771), daughter of Charles Pym of Saint Kitts, from whom Lord Romney inherited slave estates in Saint Kitts. They had ten children:

- Hon. Robert Pym Marsham (1743–1762)
- Hon. Charles Marsham (1744–1811), succeeded as 3rd Baron Romney, created 1st Earl of Romney in 1801
- Hon. John Marsham (b. 1748, died young)
- Hon. Priscilla Marsham (1745/1750–1804)
- Hon. Elizabeth Marsham (1751–1828)
- Hon. Frances Marsham (1755–1821)
- Hon. Shovel [or Chauvel] Marsham (b. 1757, died young)
- Rev. Hon. Jacob Marsham (1759–1840), Canon of Windsor
- Hon. Harriot Marsham (b. 1760, died young)
- Hon. Charlotte Marsham (1761–1794), married John Coker

Peerage of Great Britain
| Preceded by Robert Marsham | Baron Romney; 1724–1793 | Succeeded by Charles Marsham |
