= William Deedes (Hythe MP) =

English Member of Parliament

William Deedes (1761–1834), of Sandling, near Hythe, Kent, was an English Member of Parliament. He was a Member (MP) of the Parliament of the United Kingdom for Hythe 1807–1812.
