= Charles Marsham, 1st Earl of Romney =

British politician

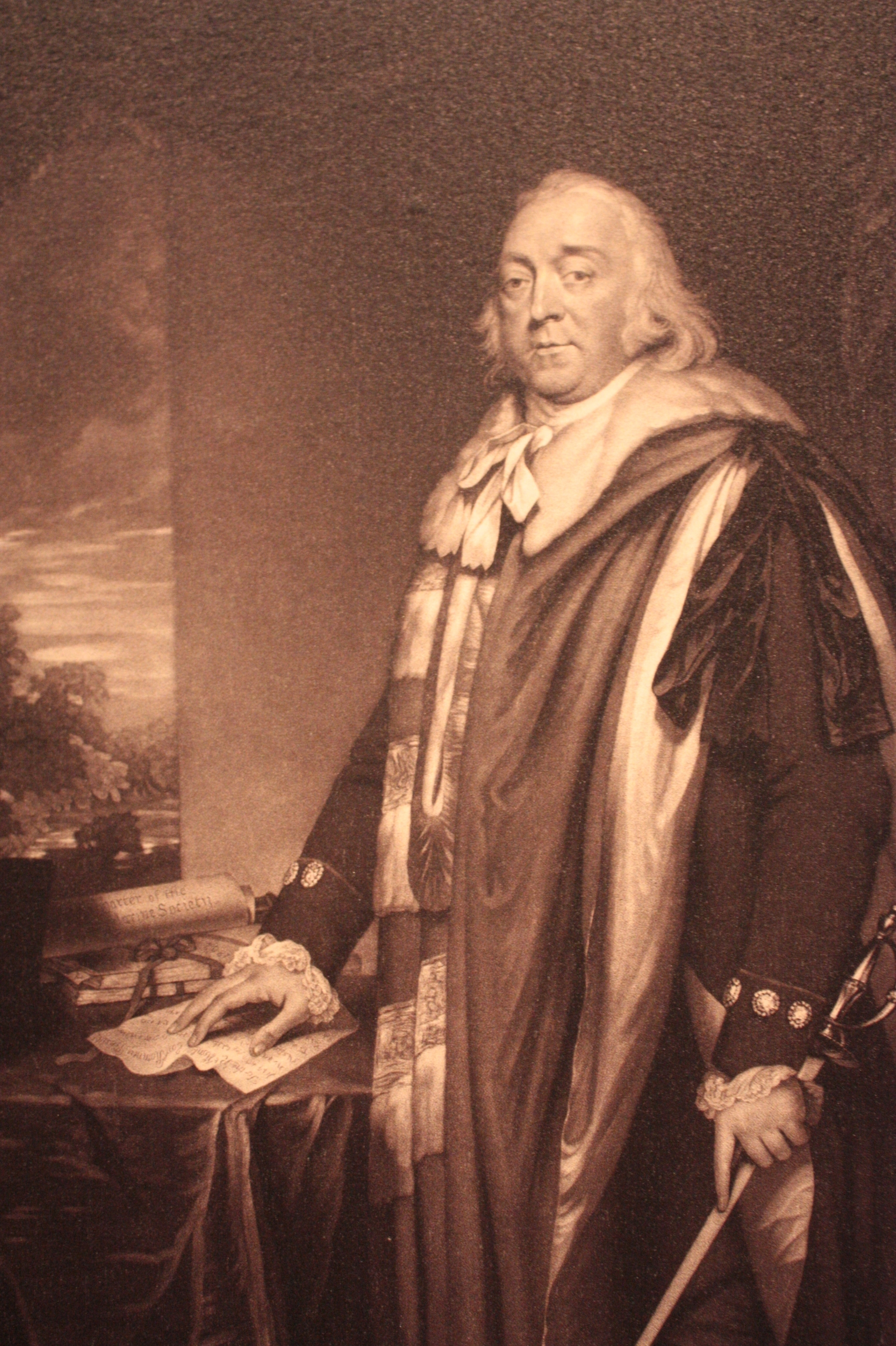
- Engraving of Charles Marsham based on a picture by Sir William Beechey, 1803

Member of Parliament for Kent
- In office 1774–1790

Member of Parliament for Maidstone
- In office 1768–1774

Personal details
- Born: 28 September 1744
- Died: 1 March 1811 (aged 66)
- Spouse: Frances Wyndham (m. 1776; died 1795)
- Children: 2+, including Charles
- Parent: Robert Marsham (father)
- Relatives: Jacob Marsham (brother); Robert Marsham (grandfather)
- Education: Christ Church, Oxford

Charles Marsham, 1st Earl of Romney (28 September 1744 – 1 March 1811), known as The Lord Romney between 1793 and 1801, was a British politician who sat in the House of Commons from 1768 to 1790, inherited his peerage in 1793 and was created Earl of Romney in 1801.

== Biography ==
Romney was the son of Robert Marsham, 2nd Baron Romney, and Priscilla, daughter and heiress of Charles Pym. He was educated at Eton College (1753–63) and entered Christ Church, Oxford, in 1763. He succeeded his father to the barony on 16 November 1793. In 1793 Charles inherited his grandfather's huge sugar plantations, jointly known as "Romney's", on the island of St. Kitts in the Caribbean. The property had been part of his father's marriage settlement to his mother in 1742.

== Political career ==
Romney was returned to Parliament for Maidstone in 1768, a seat he held until 1774, and then represented Kent from 1774 to 1790. He was also Lord Lieutenant of Kent from 1797 to 1808.

In 1799 he entertained King George III at his seat Moat House, when the King reviewed about six thousand of the Kentish Volunteers. A Doric-style temple was constructed in Mote Park to commemorate the occasion.

== Marriage & children ==
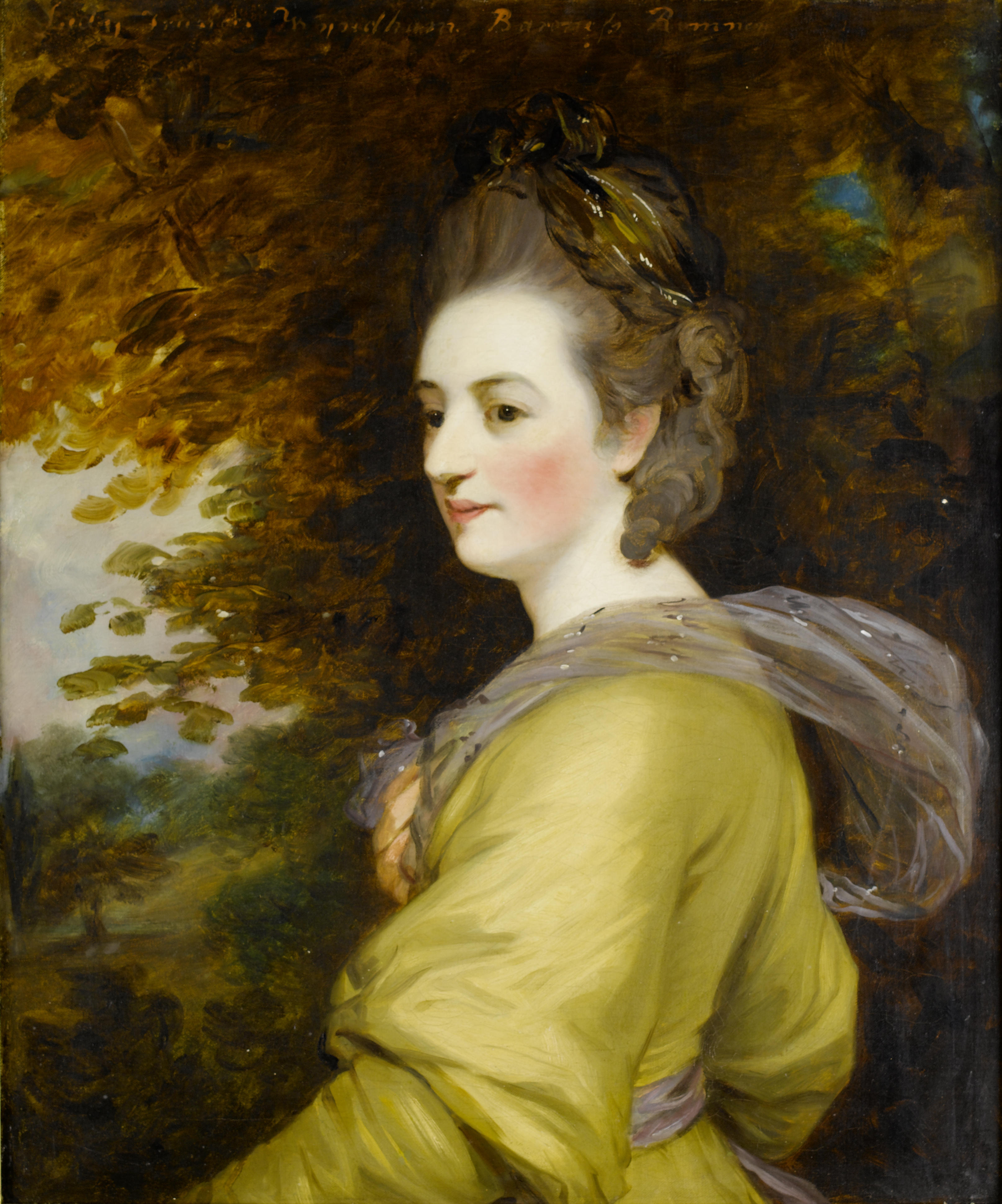
Lady Frances Wyndham (John Hoppner)

Lord Romney married Lady Frances Wyndham (born 9 July 1755, died 15 January 1795), daughter of Charles Wyndham, 2nd Earl of Egremont, on 30 August 1776. They had two surviving children:

- Charles Marsham, 2nd Earl of Romney (born 22 November 1777, died 29 March 1845)
- Lady Frances Marsham (born 25 October 1778, died 30 June 1868). Married Sir John Buchanan Riddell of that Ilk, 9th Bt on 17 August 1805 and had issue, including Sir Walter Riddell of that Ilk, 10th Bt.

Lady Romney died in January 1795 at the age of 39. Lord Romney died in March 1811, aged 66, and was succeeded in the earldom and other titles by his son, Charles.

== Honours ==
Romney was elected a Fellow of the Royal Society in 1766.

In 1801 Romney was created Viscount Marsham, of the Mote in the County of Kent, and Earl of Romney.

Parliament of Great Britain
Preceded by Rose Fuller; William Northey	Member of Parliament for Maidstone; 1768–1774; With: Robert Gregory	Succeeded by Horatio Mann; Lord Guernsey
Preceded by Sir Brook Bridges, Bt; Sir Charles Farnaby, Bt	Member of Parliament for Kent; 1774–1790; With: Thomas Knight 1774–1780; Filmer Honywood 1780–1790	Succeeded by Filmer Honywood; Sir Edward Knatchbull, Bt
Honorary titles
Preceded by The Duke of Dorset	Lord Lieutenant of Kent; 1797–1808	Succeeded by The Earl Camden
Peerage of Great Britain
Preceded by Robert Marsham	Baron Romney; 1793–1811	Succeeded by Charles Marsham
Peerage of the United Kingdom
New creation	Earl of Romney; 1801–1811	Succeeded by Charles Marsham
