= George Carpenter, 2nd Baron Carpenter =

English landowner and Member of Parliament

The Right Honourable The Lord Carpenter of Killaghy FRS
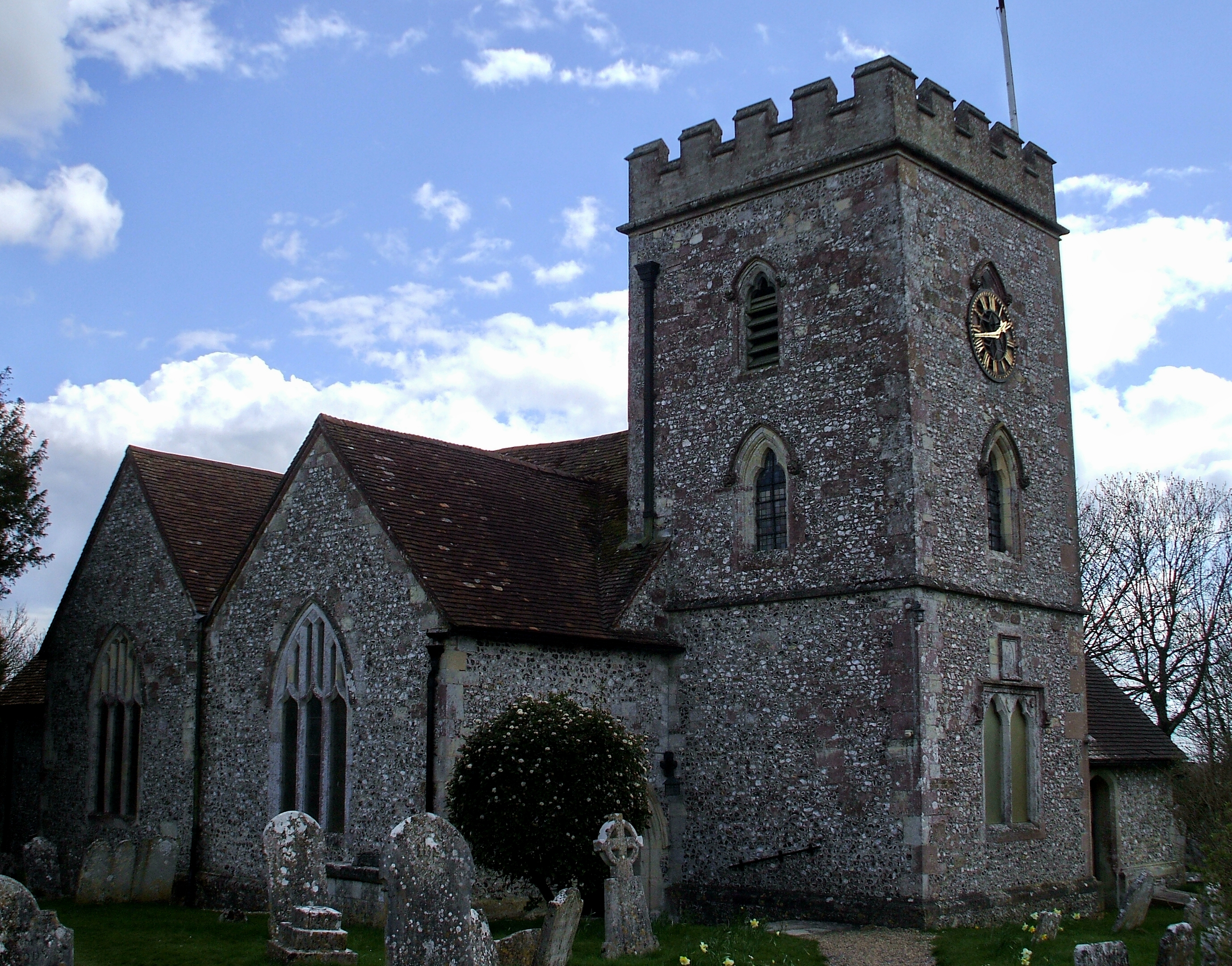
- St Andrews, Owlesbury, where Carpenter was buried

Member of Parliament for Weobley
- In office 1741–1747

Member of Parliament for Morpeth
- In office 1717–1727

Personal details
- Born: 1695 Ocle Pychard, Herefordshire, England
- Died: 12 August 1749 (aged 54) Grosvenor Square, London
- Resting place: Owslebury
- Party: Whig
- Spouse: Elizabeth Petty (m. 1722)
- Children: George; Alicia
- Parent(s): George Carpenter, 1st Baron Carpenter; Alice Caulfield
- Occupation: Politician and landowner

Military service
- Allegiance: Great Britain
- Rank: Lieutenant-Colonel
- Unit: Life Guards

Lieutenant-Colonel George Carpenter, 2nd Baron Carpenter FRS (c. 1695 – 12 July 1749) of the Homme, Dilwyn, Herefordshire was an English landowner and Member of Parliament at different periods between 1717 and 1747.

== Personal details ==
George Carpenter was born sometime in 1695 at Ocle Pychard, only son of George Carpenter, 1st Baron Carpenter and Alice Caulfield.

In August 1722, Carpenter married Elizabeth Petty (1707?–1791); they had two surviving children, George (1723–1762) and Alicia (c.1726–died 1794). Both made extremely beneficial marriages; George became Earl of Tyrconnell, while Alicia was Lady of the Bedchamber to Queen Charlotte and married the Earl of Egremont, who was Secretary of State from 1761 to 1763.

== Career ==
Carpenter held a number of commissions in his father's regiment, the 3rd The King's Own Hussars, including Lieutenant in 1708 when he was 13 and Captain in 1712, but does not appear to have served. Regiments and commissions were then considered private assets, that could be used as an investment or to provide an income; their award to children was later discouraged, but drawing pay and delegating duties to a substitute remained a common practice.

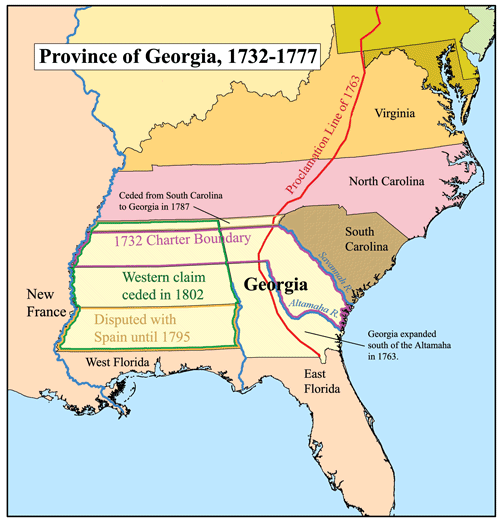
From 1732 to 1740, Carpenter was one of the Trustees for establishing the Province of Georgia

In August 1715, he was made captain in the 1st Foot Guards, then Lieutenant-Colonel in the Life Guards in January 1730. Again, this did not require active service; although Guards regiments theoretically contained up to 24 companies, actual numbers were far lower and commissions often nominal.

He was returned as Whig MP for Morpeth from 1717 to 1727; after inheriting his cousin's estate at Homme in 1733, he later sat for the nearby seat of Weobley between 1741 and 1747. In June 1729, he was invested as a Fellow of the Royal Society. In 1737, he submitted to the Society an account of a wound received by his father at the Battle of Brihuega in 1710, when a musket ball remained lodged in his throat for nearly a year.

In 1732, he was named one of the Georgia Trustees, a committee set up to establish the Province of Georgia, last of the Thirteen Colonies in British North America. The brainchild of James Oglethorpe, it was an ambitious, philanthropic venture, which began life as a private enterprise but struggled to attract financial support and was eventually taken over by the Crown in 1752. Carpenter played a secondary role; he resigned in 1738, was re-elected in 1739, apparently against his will, before resigning again in 1740. When the town of Brunswick, Georgia was established in 1738, "Carpenter Street" was named after him.

He succeeded his father in the barony on 10 February 1731. This was an Irish peerage which allowed him to remain a member of the House of Commons. On 23 May 1733, he inherited the estate of The Homme (or Holme) in Dilwyn, Herefordshire from his second cousin, Thomas Carpenter. He died 12 July 1749 at Grosvenor Square, London and was buried in the family vault at St Andrews, Owlesbury. His will, dated 31 December 1748, was probated on 24 July 1749.

== Coat of arms ==
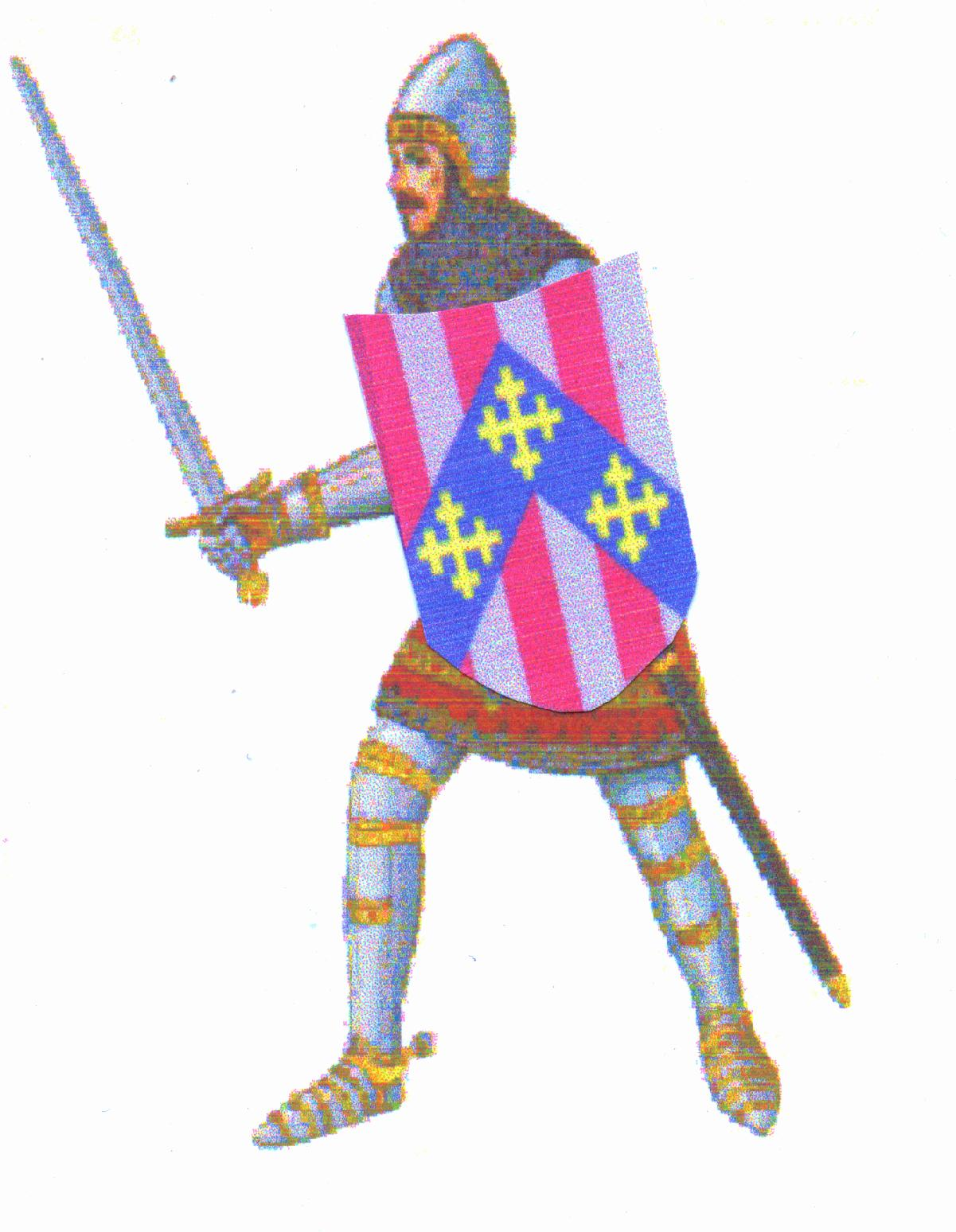
Sample of a medieval knight with an early Carpenter Coat of Arms on shield.

Lord Carpenter's Arms appear to be of French or Norman origin, "Paly of six, argent and gules, on a chevron azure, 3 cross crosslets or." Crest, on a wreath a globe in a frame all or. Supporters, two horses, party-perfess, embattled argent and gules. Motto: "Per Acuta Belli" (Through the Asperities of War). These arms descend from John Carpenter, the younger (abt. 1372 – 1442) who was the noted Town Clerk of London during the reigns of King Henry V & King Henry VI.

These arms are often referred to as the Hereford arms, named for the later ancestral home of the Carpenter Family in Hereford, England. The Crest, supporters and motto apparently have changed several times over the centuries.

Sir William Boyd Carpenter (1841–1918), Bishop of Ripon, afterwards a Canon of Westminster and Chaplain to the reigning sovereign of England, wrote in a letter dated 7 August 1907 that his family bore the Hereford Arms. Sir Noel Paton, upon painting the family arms, informed him that the supporters were originally a round-handled sword, which in drawing over time became shortened, until nothing but the cross and globe were left beneath it. Those Hereford Arms were used by "John Carpenter, town clerk of London, who died 1442 A. D." His grandson John Boyd-Carpenter, Baron Boyd-Carpenter (1908–1998), continued the arms into the new century by passing it down to his son, Thomas Boyd-Carpenter, who was himself knighted after a military career as a Lieutenant-General and for public service.

== Sources ==
- Carpenter, Lord George (1737). "An Account of the Wound, Which the Late Lord Carpenter Received at Brihuega; Whereby a Bullet Remained Near His Gullet for a Year Wanting a Few Days; Communicated to the Royal Society by His Son the Right Honourable George Lord Carpenter, F. R. S. &c". Philosophical Transactions of the Royal Society of London. 40: 316. Bibcode:1737RSPT...40..316C.
- Cate, Margaret (1930). Our Todays and Yesterdays, A Story of Brunswick and the Coastal Islands. Glover Bros.
- Dalton, Charles (1904). English army lists and commission registers, 1661-1714, Volume VI 1707-1714. Eyre & Spottiswoode.
- Guy, Alan (1985). Economy and Discipline: Officership and the British Army, 1714–63. Manchester University Press. ISBN 978-0-7190-1099-6.
- Hanham, A (2006). "Trustees for establishing the colony of Georgia in America [Georgia trustees; Georgia Society]". Oxford Dictionary of National Biography (online ed.). Oxford University Press. doi:10.1093/ref:odnb/95206. (Subscription, Wikipedia Library access or UK public library membership required.)
- Sedgwick, Romney (1970). CARPENTER, George (c.1695-1749), of the Homme, Dilwyn, nr. Weobley, Herefordshire in The History of Parliament: the House of Commons 1715-1754. Boydell & Brewer.
- Springman, Michael (2008). The Guards Brigade in the Crimea (2014 ed.). Pen and Sword. ISBN 978-1844156788.

== Bibliography ==
- Phillips, Ulrich Bonnell (December 1922). "New Light Upon the Founding of Georgia". Georgia Historical Quarterly. VI (4): 5–12.
- G.E. Cokayne; with Vicary Gibbs, H.A. Doubleday, Geoffrey H. White, Duncan Warrand and Lord Howard de Walden, editors, The Complete Peerage of England, Scotland, Ireland, Great Britain and the United Kingdom, Extant, Extinct or Dormant, new ed., 13 volumes in 14 (1910–1959; reprint in 6 volumes, Gloucester, UK: Alan Sutton Publishing, 2000), volume III, page 46, 54 & 126.
- Peter W. Hammond, editor, The Complete Peerage or a History of the House of Lords and All its Members From the Earliest Times, Volume XIV: Addenda & Corrigenda (Stroud, Gloucestershire, UK: Sutton Publishing, 1998), page 151.

Parliament of Great Britain
Preceded by Viscount Morpeth; The Viscount Castlecomer	Member of Parliament for Morpeth; 1717–1727; With: Viscount Morpeth	Succeeded by Viscount Morpeth; Thomas Robinson
Preceded by Sir John Buckworth, Bt; James Cornewall	Member of Parliament for Weobly; 1741–1747; With: The Viscount Palmerston	Succeeded by Mansel Powell; Savage Mostyn
Peerage of Ireland
Preceded by George Carpenter	Baron Carpenter; 1731–1749	Succeeded by George Carpenter
