= Thomas Godfrey (MP for Hythe) =

English Member of Parliament

Thomas Godfrey (1751-1810), of Brook Street House, near Sandwich, Kent, was an English Member of Parliament.

He was a Member (MP) of the Parliament of England for Hythe 1802 - 7 March 1810.
