= Baron Sydney =

Barony in the Peerage of Great Britain

Arms of the first baron, Robert Sidney: Or, a pheon azure

Baron Sydney (an alternative spelling of the surname Sidney) was a title that was created three times in British history. The title was later elevated twice into a viscounty, and from there, once more into an earldom.

== First creation (1603) ==
The first creation came in the Peerage of England in 1603 when Robert Sidney was made Baron Sydney, of Penshurst. In 1618, he was also granted the recreated title of Earl of Leicester.

=== List of Barons Sydney (first creation) ===
- Robert Sidney, 1st Earl of Leicester (1563–1626)
- Robert Sidney, 2nd Earl of Leicester (1595–1677)
- Philip Sidney, 3rd Earl of Leicester (1619–1698)

In 1689, the barony was elevated to a viscountcy and granted to Henry Sydney, 1st Earl of Romney (younger brother of the 3rd Earl of Leicester).

== Second creation (1768) ==
The second creation came in 1768 when Dudley Cosby (c. 1730–1774), Minister Plenipotentiary to Denmark between 1763 and 1765, was made Baron Sydney, of Stradbally in the Queen's County, in the Peerage of Ireland. He was the grandson and namesake of Dudley Cosby, who represented the Queen's County in the Irish House of Commons, and the great-nephew of William Cosby. This creation, however, soon became extinct on Sydney's death in 1774.

== Third creation (1783) ==
The third creation came on 6 March 1783 when Thomas Townshend was created Baron Sydney, of Chiselhurst in the County of Kent, in the Peerage of Great Britain, and entered the House of Lords. He was soon elevated to Viscount Sydney of Chislehurst on 11 June 1789, and his grandson was eventually created Earl Sydney in 1874.

== Family tree ==
Marquesses Townshend, Earls of Romney, and Baronets of Cuckston

Shirley Baronet of Staunton Harold in the County of Leicester, 1611
George Shirley; 1559–1622; 1st Baronet
Baronet of Cuckston, 1663
Henry Shirley; 1589–1633; 2nd Baronet	Robert Sidney; 1595–1677; Earl of Leicester	John Marsham; 1602–1685; 1st Baronet of Cuckston
Earl of Romney (1st creation), 1694
Charles Shirley (1623–1646); 3rd Baronet	Robert Shirley; 1629–1656; 4th Baronet	Lady Lucy Sidney; 1630–1685	Henry Sydney; 1641–1704; 1st Earl of Romney	John Marsham; 1637–1692; 2nd Baronet of Cuckston
Earldom extinct, 1704
Baron Ferrers of Chartley abeyance terminated, 1677	Baron Townshend, of Lynn Regis in the County of Norfolk, 1661; Viscount Townshend of Raynham in the County of Norfolk, 1682
Seymour Shirley; 1647–1667; 5th Baronet	Robert Shirley; 1650–1717; Earl Ferrers, 14th Baron Ferrers of Chartley, 7th Shirley Baronet, of Staunton Harold	Thomas Pelham; 1653–1712	Horatio Townshend; 1630–1687; 1st Viscount Townshend and Baron Townshend	John Marsham; 1679–1696; 3rd Baronet of Cuckston
Robert Shirley; 1668–1669; 6th Baronet	Robert Shirley; 1673–1699	Elizabeth Pelham; 1681–1711	Charles Townshend; 1674–1738; 2nd Viscount Townshend and Baron Townshend	Robert Marsham; 1650–1703; 4th Baronet of Cuckston
Baron Romney, 1716
Elizabeth Compton; 1694–1741; 15th Baroness Ferrers of Chartley	Charles Townshend; 1700–1764; 3rd Viscount Townshend and Baron Townshend	Thomas Townshend; 1701–1780	Robert Marsham; 1685–1724; 1st Baron Romney, 5th Baronet of Cuckston
Baron Ferrers of Chartley resolved, 1749	Marquess Townshend, 1787	Baron Sydney of Chiselhurst in the County of Kent, 1783; Viscount Sydney (2nd creation) of St Leonards, 1789
Charlotte Townshend d. 1770; 16th Baroness Ferrers of Chartley, Baroness Compton	George Townshend; 1724–1807; 1st Marquess Townshend, 4th Viscount Townshend and Baron Townshend	Thomas Townshend; 1733–1800; 1st Viscount Sydney	Robert Marsham; 1712–1794; 2nd Baron Romney
Earl of Leicester (6th creation), 1784	Earl of Romney (2nd creation) and Viscount Marsham of The Mote in the County of Kent, 1801
George Townshend; 1753–1811; 2nd Marquess Townshend, 1st Earl of Leicester, 5th Viscount Townshend and Baron Townshend, 17th Baron Ferrers of Chartley, Baron Compton	John Townshend; 1757–1783	John Townshend; 1764–1831; 2nd Viscount Sydney	Charles Marsham; 1744–1811; 1st Earl of Romney and Viscount Marsham, 3rd Baron Romney
George Townshend; 1778–1885; 3rd Marquess Townshend, 2nd Earl of Leicester, 6th Viscount Townshend and Baron Townshend, 18th Baron Ferrers of Chartley, Baron Compton	John Townshend; 1798–1863; 4th Marquess Townshend, 7th Viscount Townshend and Baron Townshend	Mary Elizabeth Marsham; 1794–1847	Charles Marsham; 1777–1845; 2nd Earl of Romney and Viscount Marsham, 4th Baron Romney
Barony Ferrers of Chartley and Barony Compton in abeyance and Earldom of Leicester (6th creation) extinct, 1885	Earl Sydney of Scadbury in the County of Kent, 1874
John Townshend; 1805–1890; 1st Earl Sydney, 3rd Viscount Sydney	Charles Marsham; 1808–1874; 3nd Earl of Romney and Viscount Marsham, 5th Baron Romney
Earldom of Sydney extinct, 1890
John Villiers Stuart Townshend; 1831–1899; 5th Marquess Townshend, 8th Viscount Townshend and Baron Townshend	Charles Marsham; 1841–1905; 4th Earl of Romney and Viscount Marsham, 6th Baron Romney
John James Dudley Stuart Townshend; 1866–1921; 6th Marquess Townshend, 9th Viscount Townshend and Baron Townshend	Charles Marsham; 1864–1933; 5th Earl of Romney and Viscount Marsham, 7th Baron Romney	Reginald Hastings Marsham; 1865–1922	Sydney Edward Marsham; 1879–1952
George John Patrick Dominic Townshend; 1916–2010; 7th Marquess Townshend, 10th Viscount Townshend and Baron Townshend	Charles Marsham; 1892–1975; 6th Earl of Romney and Viscount Marsham, 8th Baron Romney	Michael Marsham; 1910–2004; 7th Earl of Romney and Viscount Marsham, 9th Baron Romney	Peter William Marsham; 1913–1970
Charles George Townshend b. 1945; 8th Marquess Townshend, 11th Viscount Townshend and Baron Townshend	Julian Marsham b. 1948; 8th Earl of Romney and Viscount Marsham, 9th Baron Romney
Thomas Charles Townshend b. 1977 styled Viscount Raynham	David Charles Marsham b. 1977 styled Viscount Marsham
Heir apparent to the Marquess of Townshend	Heir apparent to the Earl of Romney
Rafe Thomas Townshend b. 2014	James Julian Marsham b. 2014
