= Charles Marsham, 3rd Earl of Romney =

British peer and Conservative Party politician

Member of Parliament for Kent West
- In office 1841-1845

Personal details
- Born: 30 July 1808
- Died: 3 September 1874 (aged 66)
- Party: Conservative
- Spouse: Margaret Montagu-Scott (m. 1832; died 1846)
- Children: 4, including Charles and John
- Parents: Charles Marsham (father); Sophia Pitt (mother)
- Relatives: Charles Marsham (grandfather); Frances Wyndham (grandmother); William Morton Pitt (grandfather)

Charles Marsham, 3rd Earl of Romney (30 July 1808 – 3 September 1874), styled Viscount Marsham between 1811 and 1845, was a British peer and Conservative Party politician.

== Biography ==
Romney was the son of Charles Marsham, 2nd Earl of Romney, and Sophia, daughter of William Morton Pitt.

Romney was returned to Parliament as one of two representatives for Kent West in 1841, a seat he held until 1845 when he succeeded his father in the earldom and took his seat in the House of Lords.

== Marriage and children ==
Lord Romney married Lady Margaret Harriett Montagu-Scott, youngest daughter of Charles Montagu-Scott, 4th Duke of Buccleuch, on 7 February 1832. They had three sons and one daughter:

- Lady Harriet Marsham (born 17 July 1838, died 14 November 1886)
- Charles Marsham, 4th Earl of Romney (born 7 March 1841, died 21 August 1905)
- The Rev and Hon John Marsham (born 25 July 1842, died 16 September 1926)
- Hon Henry Marsham (born 26 March 1845, died 1 July 1908)

Lady Romney died in London in June 1846, aged 34. Lord Romney remained a widower until his death in September 1874, aged 66. He was succeeded in the earldom by his eldest son, Charles.

Marquesses Townshend, Earls of Romney, and Baronets of Cuckston

Shirley Baronet of Staunton Harold, 1611
George Shirley; 1559–1622; 1st Shirley Baronet of Staunton Harold
Baronet of Cuckston, 1663
Henry Shirley; 1589–1633; 2nd Shirley Baronet of Staunton Harold	Robert Sidney; 1595–1677; Earl of Leicester	John Marsham; 1602–1685; 1st Baronet of Cuckston
Earl of Romney (1st creation), 1694	Baron Townshend, of Lynn Regis, 1661; Viscount Townshend of Raynham, 1682
Charles Shirley (1623–1646); 3rd Shirley Baronet of Staunton Harold	Robert Shirley; 1629–1656; 4th Shirley Baronet of Staunton Harold	Lady Lucy Sidney; 1630–1685	Henry Sydney; 1641–1704; 1st Earl of Romney	Horatio Townshend; 1630–1687; 1st Viscount Townshend and Baron Townshend	John Marsham; 1637–1692; 2nd Baronet of Cuckston	Robert Marsham; 1650–1703; 4th Baronet of Cuckston
Earldom extinct, 1704
Baron Ferrers of Chartley abeyance terminated, 1677
Seymour Shirley; 1647–1667; 5th Shirley Baronet of Staunton Harold	Robert Shirley; 1650–1717; Earl Ferrers, 14th Baron Ferrers of Chartley, 7th Shirley Baronet, of Staunton Harold	Thomas Pelham; 1653–1712	John Marsham; 1679–1696; 3rd Baronet of Cuckston
Baron Romney, 1716
Robert Shirley; 1668–1669; 6th Shirley Baronet of Staunton Harold	Robert Shirley; 1673–1699	Elizabeth Pelham; 1681–1711	Charles Townshend; 1674–1738; 2nd Viscount Townshend and Baron Townshend	Robert Marsham; 1685–1724; 1st Baron Romney, 5th Baronet of Cuckston
Elizabeth Compton; 1694–1741; 15th Baroness Ferrers of Chartley	Charles Townshend; 1700–1764; 3rd Viscount Townshend and Baron Townshend	Thomas Townshend; 1701–1780
Baron Ferrers of Chartley resolved, 1749	Marquess Townshend, 1787	Baron Sydney of Chiselhurst, 1783; Viscount Sydney (2nd creation) of St Leonards, 1789
Charlotte Townshend d. 1770; 16th Baroness Ferrers of Chartley, Baroness Compton	George Townshend; 1724–1807; 1st Marquess Townshend, 4th Viscount Townshend and Baron Townshend	Thomas Townshend; 1733–1800; 1st Viscount Sydney	Robert Marsham; 1712–1794; 2nd Baron Romney
Earl of Leicester (6th creation), 1784	Earl of Romney (2nd creation) and Viscount Marsham of The Mote, 1801
George Townshend; 1753–1811; 2nd Marquess Townshend, 1st Earl of Leicester, 5th Viscount Townshend and Baron Townshend, 17th Baron Ferrers of Chartley, Baron Compton	John Townshend; 1757–1783	John Townshend; 1764–1831; 2nd Viscount Sydney	Charles Marsham; 1744–1811; 1st Earl of Romney and Viscount Marsham, 3rd Baron Romney
George Townshend; 1778–1885; 3rd Marquess Townshend, 2nd Earl of Leicester, 6th Viscount Townshend and Baron Townshend, 18th Baron Ferrers of Chartley, Baron Compton	John Townshend; 1798–1863; 4th Marquess Townshend, 7th Viscount Townshend and Baron Townshend	Mary Elizabeth Marsham; 1794–1847	Charles Marsham; 1777–1845; 2nd Earl of Romney and Viscount Marsham, 4th Baron Romney
Barony Ferrers of Chartley and Barony Compton in abeyance and Earldom of Leicester (6th creation) extinct, 1885	Earl Sydney of Scadbury, 1874
John Townshend; 1805–1890; 1st Earl Sydney, 3rd Viscount Sydney	Charles Marsham; 1808–1874; 3nd Earl of Romney and Viscount Marsham, 5th Baron Romney
Earldom of Sydney extinct, 1890
John Villiers Stuart Townshend; 1831–1899; 5th Marquess Townshend, 8th Viscount Townshend and Baron Townshend	Charles Marsham; 1841–1905; 4th Earl of Romney and Viscount Marsham, 6th Baron Romney
John James Dudley Stuart Townshend; 1866–1921; 6th Marquess Townshend, 9th Viscount Townshend and Baron Townshend	Charles Marsham; 1864–1933; 5th Earl of Romney and Viscount Marsham, 7th Baron Romney	Reginald Hastings Marsham; 1865–1922	Sydney Edward Marsham; 1879–1952
George John Patrick Dominic Townshend; 1916–2010; 7th Marquess Townshend, 10th Viscount Townshend and Baron Townshend	Charles Marsham; 1892–1975; 6th Earl of Romney and Viscount Marsham, 8th Baron Romney	Michael Marsham; 1910–2004; 7th Earl of Romney and Viscount Marsham, 9th Baron Romney	Peter William Marsham; 1913–1970
Charles George Townshend; 1945–2025; 8th Marquess Townshend, 11th Viscount Townshend and Baron Townshend	Julian Marsham b. 1948; 8th Earl of Romney and Viscount Marsham, 9th Baron Romney
Thomas Charles Townshend b. 1977; 9th Marquess Townshend, 12th Viscount Townshend and Baron Townshend	David Charles Marsham b. 1977 styled Viscount Marsham
Heir apparent to the Earl of Romney
Rafe Thomas Townshend b. 2014 styled Viscount Raynham	James Julian Marsham b. 2014
Heir apparent to the Marquess of Townshend

Parliament of the United Kingdom
Preceded by Thomas Law Hodges; Sir Edmund Filmer, Bt	Member of Parliament for Kent West; 1841–1845; With: Sir Edmund Filmer, Bt	Succeeded by Sir Edmund Filmer, Bt; Thomas Austen
Peerage of the United Kingdom
Preceded by Charles Marsham	Earl of Romney; 1845–1874	Succeeded by Charles Marsham
