= Viscount Sydney =

English noble title

Viscount Sydney (an alternative spelling of the surname Sidney) is a title that has been created twice. The title was elevated twice from a barony, and once into an earldom.

== First creation (1689) ==
Henry Sydney, Earl of Romney

The first creation came on 9 April 1689 when Henry Sydney was elevated from Baron Sydney to Viscount Sydney, of Sheppey, in the Peerage of England. On 14 May 1694, he was also created Earl of Romney but his titles became extinct when he died unmarried in 1704.

== Second creation (1789) ==
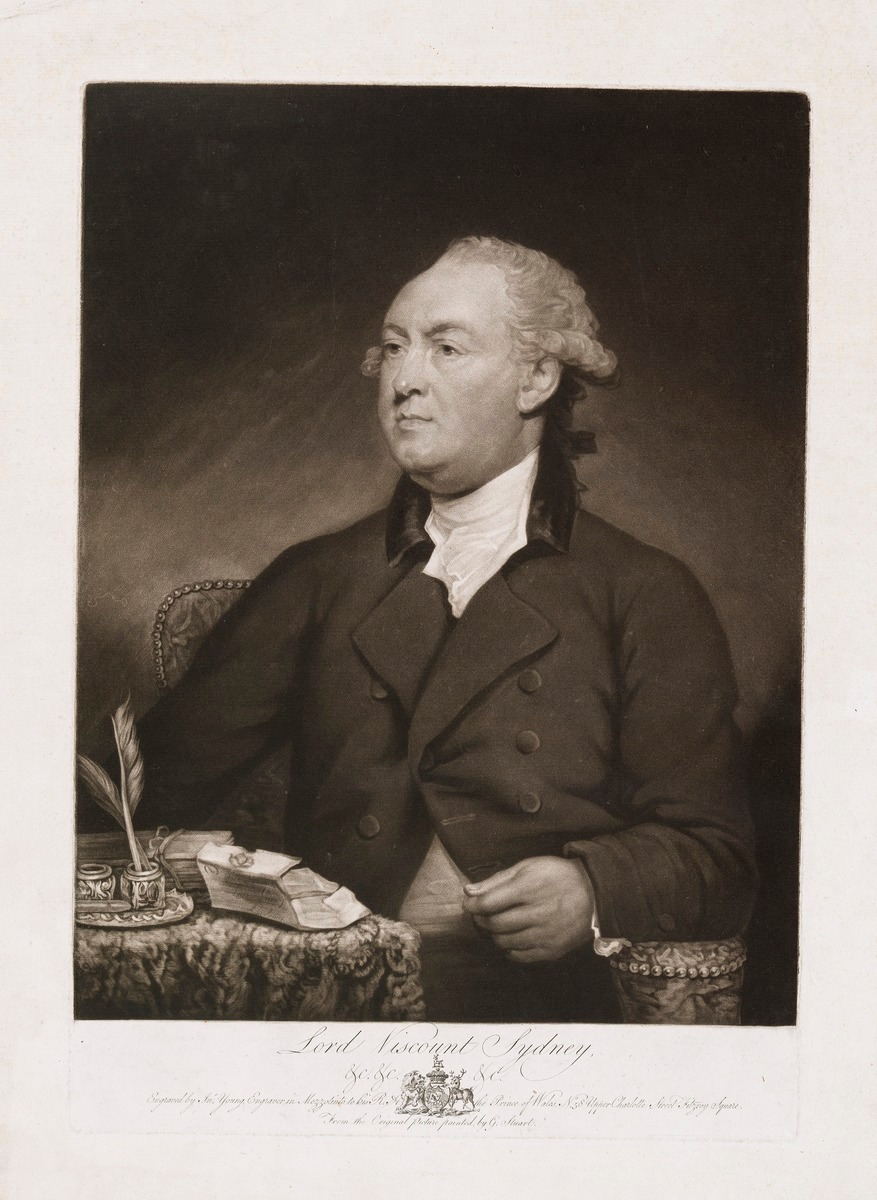
Thomas Townshend, 1st Viscount Sydney (2nd creation).

The second creation came in 1789 when Thomas Townshend (the then Baron Sydney) was made Viscount Sydney, of St Leonards, in the Peerage of Great Britain. He served as Home Secretary and Leader of the House of Lords. Townshend was the son of the Hon. Thomas Townshend, second son of Charles Townshend, 2nd Viscount Townshend, whose eldest son Charles Townshend, 3rd Viscount Townshend is the ancestor of the Marquesses of Townshend. Townshend was also a female-line great-great-grandson of Lady Lucy Sydney, daughter of Robert Sydney, 2nd Earl of Leicester, hence his choice of title. The family seat of this branch of the Townshend family was Frognal House, near Sidcup (then in Kent, now in the London Borough of Bexley).

=== List of Viscounts Sydney (1789) ===
- Thomas Townshend, 1st Viscount Sydney (1733–1800) - the cities of Sydney (1785) in Nova Scotia, Canada, and Sydney (1788) in New South Wales, Australia, were named in his honour
- John Thomas Townshend, 2nd Viscount Sydney (1764–1831) - represented Newport and Whitchurch in the House of Commons.
- John Robert Townshend, 3rd Viscount Sydney (1805–1890) - served as Lord Chamberlain of the Household and as Lord Steward of the Household, and was elevated to Earl Sydney in 1874. He died childless in February 1890, aged 84, when all his titles became extinct.

== Family tree ==
Marquesses Townshend, Earls of Romney, and Baronets of Cuckston

Shirley Baronet of Staunton Harold, 1611
George Shirley; 1559–1622; 1st Shirley Baronet of Staunton Harold
Baronet of Cuckston, 1663
Henry Shirley; 1589–1633; 2nd Shirley Baronet of Staunton Harold	Robert Sidney; 1595–1677; Earl of Leicester	John Marsham; 1602–1685; 1st Baronet of Cuckston
Earl of Romney (1st creation), 1694	Baron Townshend, of Lynn Regis, 1661; Viscount Townshend of Raynham, 1682
Charles Shirley (1623–1646); 3rd Shirley Baronet of Staunton Harold	Robert Shirley; 1629–1656; 4th Shirley Baronet of Staunton Harold	Lady Lucy Sidney; 1630–1685	Henry Sydney; 1641–1704; 1st Earl of Romney	Horatio Townshend; 1630–1687; 1st Viscount Townshend, etc.	John Marsham; 1637–1692; 2nd Baronet of Cuckston	Robert Marsham; 1650–1703; 4th Baronet of Cuckston
Earldom extinct, 1704
Baron Ferrers of Chartley abeyance terminated, 1677
Seymour Shirley; 1647–1667; 5th Shirley Baronet of Staunton Harold	Robert Shirley; 1650–1717; Earl Ferrers, 14th Baron Ferrers of Chartley, 7th Shirley Baronet, of Staunton Harold	Thomas Pelham; 1653–1712	John Marsham; 1679–1696; 3rd Baronet of Cuckston
Baron Romney, 1716
Robert Shirley; 1668–1669; 6th Shirley Baronet of Staunton Harold	Robert Shirley; 1673–1699	Elizabeth Pelham; 1681–1711	Charles Townshend; 1674–1738; 2nd Viscount Townshend, etc.	Robert Marsham; 1685–1724; 1st Baron Romney, 5th Baronet of Cuckston
Elizabeth Compton; 1694–1741; 15th Baroness Ferrers of Chartley	Charles Townshend; 1700–1764; 3rd Viscount Townshend, etc.	Thomas Townshend; 1701–1780
Baron Ferrers of Chartley resolved, 1749	Marquess Townshend, 1787	Baron Sydney of Chiselhurst, 1783; Viscount Sydney (2nd creation) of St Leonards, 1789
Charlotte Townshend d. 1770; 16th Baroness Ferrers of Chartley, Baroness Compton	George Townshend; 1724–1807; 1st Marquess Townshend, 4th Viscount Townshend, etc.	Thomas Townshend; 1733–1800; 1st Viscount Sydney	Robert Marsham; 1712–1794; 2nd Baron Romney
Earl of Leicester (6th creation), 1784	Earl of Romney (2nd creation) and Viscount Marsham of The Mote, 1801
George Townshend; 1753–1811; 2nd Marquess Townshend, 1st Earl of Leicester, 5th Viscount Townshend, etc., 17th Baron Ferrers of Chartley, Baron Compton	John Townshend; 1757–1783	John Townshend; 1764–1831; 2nd Viscount Sydney	Charles Marsham; 1744–1811; 1st Earl of Romney, etc., 3rd Baron Romney
George Townshend; 1778–1885; 3rd Marquess Townshend, 2nd Earl of Leicester, 6th Viscount Townshend, etc., 18th Baron Ferrers of Chartley, Baron Compton	John Townshend; 1798–1863; 4th Marquess Townshend, 7th Viscount Townshend, etc.	Mary Elizabeth Marsham; 1794–1847	Charles Marsham; 1777–1845; 2nd Earl of Romney, etc., 4th Baron Romney
Barony Ferrers of Chartley and Barony Compton in abeyance and Earldom of Leicester (6th creation) extinct, 1885	Earl Sydney of Scadbury, 1874
John Townshend; 1805–1890; 1st Earl Sydney, 3rd Viscount Sydney	Charles Marsham; 1808–1874; 3nd Earl of Romney, etc., 5th Baron Romney
Earldom of Sydney extinct, 1890
John Villiers Stuart Townshend; 1831–1899; 5th Marquess Townshend, 8th Viscount Townshend, etc.	Charles Marsham; 1841–1905; 4th Earl of Romney, etc., 6th Baron Romney
John James Dudley Stuart Townshend; 1866–1921; 6th Marquess Townshend, 9th Viscount Townshend, etc.	Charles Marsham; 1864–1933; 5th Earl of Romney, etc., 7th Baron Romney	Reginald Hastings Marsham; 1865–1922	Sydney Edward Marsham; 1879–1952
George John Patrick Dominic Townshend; 1916–2010; 7th Marquess Townshend, 10th Viscount Townshend, etc.	Charles Marsham; 1892–1975; 6th Earl of Romney, etc., 8th Baron Romney	Michael Marsham; 1910–2004; 7th Earl of Romney, etc., 9th Baron Romney	Peter William Marsham; 1913–1970
Charles George Townshend; 1945–2025; 8th Marquess Townshend, 11th Viscount Townshend, etc.	Julian Marsham b. 1948; 8th Earl of Romney, etc., 9th Baron Romney
Thomas Charles Townshend b. 1977; 9th Marquess Townshend, 12th Viscount Townshend, etc.	David Charles Marsham b. 1977 styled Viscount Marsham
Heir apparent to the Earl of Romney
Rafe Thomas Townshend b. 2014 styled Viscount Raynham	James Julian Marsham b. 2014
Heir apparent to the Marquess of Townshend

== See also ==
- Sidney (surname)
