= Sir John Marsham, 1st Baronet =

English antiquary

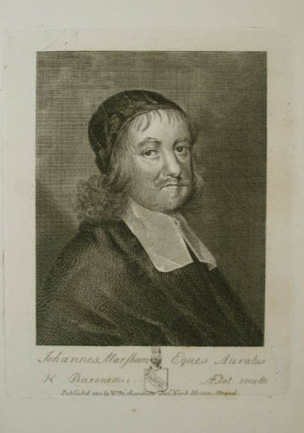
- Copper engraving of Marsham, Johannes Marsham Eques Auratus
- Born: 23 August 1602
- Died: 25 May 1685 (aged 82); Bushey Hall, Hertfordshire
- Occupations: clerk, Member of Parliament
- Known for: chronologist

Sir John Marsham, 1st Baronet (23 August 1602 – 25 May 1685) was an English antiquary known as a writer on chronology. He was also a chancery clerk and politician who sat in the House of Commons from 1660 to 1661.

== Life ==
Marsham was second son of Thomas Marsham, alderman of London, by Magdalen, daughter of Richard Springham, a London merchant. After attending Westminster School he matriculated at St John's College, Oxford, on 22 October 1619; he graduated B.A. on 17 February 1623, M.A. on 5 July 1625. He spent the winter of 1625 in Paris. In 1626 and 1627 he travelled in France, Italy, and Germany, and then returned to London, where he became a member of the Middle Temple in 1627. In 1629 he went through Holland and Gelderland to the siege of 's-Hertogenbosch in Brabant; and then by Flushing to Boulogne and Paris in the retinue of Sir Thomas Edmondes, ambassador extraordinary at the court of Louis XIII.

Marsham was made one of the six clerks in chancery on 15 February 1638. On the outbreak of the First English Civil War he followed the king to Oxford, and was consequently deprived of his place by Parliament. After the surrender of Oxford he returned to London (1646), and having compounded for his estate, he lived in retirement at his seat of Whorn Place, in the parish of Cuxton, Kent.

In April 1660, Marsham was elected a Member of Parliament (MP) for Rochester in the Convention Parliament. At the Restoration, he was restored to his place in chancery, and was knighted. On 12 August 1663 he was created a baronet. He was allowed to hand over his clerkship to his son Robert on 20 October 1680.

Marsham died at Bushey Hall, Hertfordshire, on 25 May 1685, and was buried in Cuxton Church. By Elizabeth (1612–1689), daughter of Sir William Hammond of St. Albans Court in Nonington, Kent, he had two sons, John and Robert, and a daughter Elizabeth. He was succeeded initially by the eldest son John, who purchased the Mote in Maidstone and who died in 1692 when High Sheriff of Kent, but when John's own son John died young the baronetcy and Mote estate reverted to Robert.

== Works ==
Marsham had a reputation in his day for his knowledge of history, chronology, and languages. According to Wotton, Marsham was the first who made Egyptian antiquities intelligible. Hallam also commended his work.

He wrote Diatriba Chronologica, London, 1649, a dissertation in which he examined difficulties in the chronology of the Old Testament. Most of it was afterwards inserted in his more elaborate Chronicus Canon Ægypticus, Ebraicus, Græcus, et disquisitiones, London, 1672, a beautifully printed book (other editions, 4to, Leipzig, 1676, and 4to, Franeker, 1699, but both inaccurate). He wrote also the preface to the first volume of Roger Dodsworth and William Dugdale's Monasticon Anglicanum (1655), which is entitled Propylaion Johannis Marshami; it is a complex survey of English monasticism.

He left unfinished Canonis Chronici liber quintus: sive Imperium Persicum, De Provinciis et Legionibus Romanis, De re nummaria, and other treatises. His nephew Thomas Stanley dedicated to him his History of Philosophy (1655).

Marquesses Townshend, Earls of Romney, and Baronets of Cuckston

Shirley Baronet of Staunton Harold, 1611
George Shirley; 1559–1622; 1st Shirley Baronet of Staunton Harold
Baronet of Cuckston, 1663
Henry Shirley; 1589–1633; 2nd Shirley Baronet of Staunton Harold	Robert Sidney; 1595–1677; Earl of Leicester	John Marsham; 1602–1685; 1st Baronet of Cuckston
Earl of Romney (1st creation), 1694	Baron Townshend, of Lynn Regis, 1661; Viscount Townshend of Raynham, 1682
Charles Shirley (1623–1646); 3rd Shirley Baronet of Staunton Harold	Robert Shirley; 1629–1656; 4th Shirley Baronet of Staunton Harold	Lady Lucy Sidney; 1630–1685	Henry Sydney; 1641–1704; 1st Earl of Romney	Horatio Townshend; 1630–1687; 1st Viscount Townshend and Baron Townshend	John Marsham; 1637–1692; 2nd Baronet of Cuckston	Robert Marsham; 1650–1703; 4th Baronet of Cuckston
Earldom extinct, 1704
Baron Ferrers of Chartley abeyance terminated, 1677
Seymour Shirley; 1647–1667; 5th Shirley Baronet of Staunton Harold	Robert Shirley; 1650–1717; Earl Ferrers, 14th Baron Ferrers of Chartley, 7th Shirley Baronet, of Staunton Harold	Thomas Pelham; 1653–1712	John Marsham; 1679–1696; 3rd Baronet of Cuckston
Baron Romney, 1716
Robert Shirley; 1668–1669; 6th Shirley Baronet of Staunton Harold	Robert Shirley; 1673–1699	Elizabeth Pelham; 1681–1711	Charles Townshend; 1674–1738; 2nd Viscount Townshend and Baron Townshend	Robert Marsham; 1685–1724; 1st Baron Romney, 5th Baronet of Cuckston
Elizabeth Compton; 1694–1741; 15th Baroness Ferrers of Chartley	Charles Townshend; 1700–1764; 3rd Viscount Townshend and Baron Townshend	Thomas Townshend; 1701–1780
Baron Ferrers of Chartley resolved, 1749	Marquess Townshend, 1787	Baron Sydney of Chiselhurst, 1783; Viscount Sydney (2nd creation) of St Leonards, 1789
Charlotte Townshend d. 1770; 16th Baroness Ferrers of Chartley, Baroness Compton	George Townshend; 1724–1807; 1st Marquess Townshend, 4th Viscount Townshend and Baron Townshend	Thomas Townshend; 1733–1800; 1st Viscount Sydney	Robert Marsham; 1712–1794; 2nd Baron Romney
Earl of Leicester (6th creation), 1784	Earl of Romney (2nd creation) and Viscount Marsham of The Mote, 1801
George Townshend; 1753–1811; 2nd Marquess Townshend, 1st Earl of Leicester, 5th Viscount Townshend and Baron Townshend, 17th Baron Ferrers of Chartley, Baron Compton	John Townshend; 1757–1783	John Townshend; 1764–1831; 2nd Viscount Sydney	Charles Marsham; 1744–1811; 1st Earl of Romney and Viscount Marsham, 3rd Baron Romney
George Townshend; 1778–1885; 3rd Marquess Townshend, 2nd Earl of Leicester, 6th Viscount Townshend and Baron Townshend, 18th Baron Ferrers of Chartley, Baron Compton	John Townshend; 1798–1863; 4th Marquess Townshend, 7th Viscount Townshend and Baron Townshend	Mary Elizabeth Marsham; 1794–1847	Charles Marsham; 1777–1845; 2nd Earl of Romney and Viscount Marsham, 4th Baron Romney
Barony Ferrers of Chartley and Barony Compton in abeyance and Earldom of Leicester (6th creation) extinct, 1885	Earl Sydney of Scadbury, 1874
John Townshend; 1805–1890; 1st Earl Sydney, 3rd Viscount Sydney	Charles Marsham; 1808–1874; 3nd Earl of Romney and Viscount Marsham, 5th Baron Romney
Earldom of Sydney extinct, 1890
John Villiers Stuart Townshend; 1831–1899; 5th Marquess Townshend, 8th Viscount Townshend and Baron Townshend	Charles Marsham; 1841–1905; 4th Earl of Romney and Viscount Marsham, 6th Baron Romney
John James Dudley Stuart Townshend; 1866–1921; 6th Marquess Townshend, 9th Viscount Townshend and Baron Townshend	Charles Marsham; 1864–1933; 5th Earl of Romney and Viscount Marsham, 7th Baron Romney	Reginald Hastings Marsham; 1865–1922	Sydney Edward Marsham; 1879–1952
George John Patrick Dominic Townshend; 1916–2010; 7th Marquess Townshend, 10th Viscount Townshend and Baron Townshend	Charles Marsham; 1892–1975; 6th Earl of Romney and Viscount Marsham, 8th Baron Romney	Michael Marsham; 1910–2004; 7th Earl of Romney and Viscount Marsham, 9th Baron Romney	Peter William Marsham; 1913–1970
Charles George Townshend; 1945–2025; 8th Marquess Townshend, 11th Viscount Townshend and Baron Townshend	Julian Marsham b. 1948; 8th Earl of Romney and Viscount Marsham, 9th Baron Romney
Thomas Charles Townshend b. 1977; 9th Marquess Townshend, 12th Viscount Townshend and Baron Townshend	David Charles Marsham b. 1977 styled Viscount Marsham
Heir apparent to the Earl of Romney
Rafe Thomas Townshend b. 2014 styled Viscount Raynham	James Julian Marsham b. 2014
Heir apparent to the Marquess of Townshend

Parliament of England
Preceded by Thomas Walsingham one seat vacant	Member of Parliament for Rochester; 1660–1661; With: Peter Pett	Succeeded by Sir Francis Clerke; Sir William Batten
Baronetage of England
New creation	Baronet (of Cuckston); 1663–1685	Succeeded by John Marsham
