= Julian Marsham, 8th Earl of Romney =

English peer

The Right Honourable The Earl of Romney

High Sheriff of Norfolk
- In office 2007

Personal details
- Born: 1948 (age 77–78)
- Spouse: Catriona Stewart (m. 1975)
- Children: 3
- Relatives: Joan Marsham (grandmother); Charles Marsham (grandfather)

Julian Charles Marsham, 8th Earl of Romney (born 1948, of Gayton Hall), is an English peer.

== Biography ==
Lord Romney is the son of Colonel Peter William Marsham (only son of Dame Joan Marsham) and a great grandson of the 4th Earl of Romney and his wife, Hersey Coke, granddaughter of Thomas Coke, 2nd Earl of Leicester.

He was educated at Eton and became a land agent and farmer.

In 2007, Lord Romney served as High Sheriff of Norfolk.

== Marriage and children ==
In 1975, Romney married Catriona Ann Stewart, the daughter of Robert Christie Stewart, by whom he has two sons and one daughter:

- Lieutenant Colonel David Charles Marsham, Viscount Marsham (born 18 April 1977); married Katherine F. Phillips, has issue.
- Hon. Michael Julian Marsham (born 3 March 1979) married Hon. Lucy Harriet Beaumont, daughter of Wentworth Peter Ismay Beaumont, 4th Viscount Allendale.
- Lady Laura Clare Marsham (born 18 March 1984), married James Meade, son of Olympian Richard Meade. Lady Laura is a godmother of Prince Louis, and James is a godfather of Princess Charlotte.

He succeeded his first cousin once removed, Michael Marsham, 7th Earl of Romney, in the earldom and the titles Baron Romney and Viscount Marsham in 2004.

Marquesses Townshend, Earls of Romney, and Baronets of Cuckston

Shirley Baronet of Staunton Harold, 1611
George Shirley; 1559–1622; 1st Shirley Baronet of Staunton Harold
Baronet of Cuckston, 1663
Henry Shirley; 1589–1633; 2nd Shirley Baronet of Staunton Harold	Robert Sidney; 1595–1677; Earl of Leicester	John Marsham; 1602–1685; 1st Baronet of Cuckston
Earl of Romney (1st creation), 1694	Baron Townshend, of Lynn Regis, 1661; Viscount Townshend of Raynham, 1682
Charles Shirley (1623–1646); 3rd Shirley Baronet of Staunton Harold	Robert Shirley; 1629–1656; 4th Shirley Baronet of Staunton Harold	Lady Lucy Sidney; 1630–1685	Henry Sydney; 1641–1704; 1st Earl of Romney	Horatio Townshend; 1630–1687; 1st Viscount Townshend, etc.	John Marsham; 1637–1692; 2nd Baronet of Cuckston	Robert Marsham; 1650–1703; 4th Baronet of Cuckston
Earldom extinct, 1704
Baron Ferrers of Chartley abeyance terminated, 1677
Seymour Shirley; 1647–1667; 5th Shirley Baronet of Staunton Harold	Robert Shirley; 1650–1717; Earl Ferrers, 14th Baron Ferrers of Chartley, 7th Shirley Baronet, of Staunton Harold	Thomas Pelham; 1653–1712	John Marsham; 1679–1696; 3rd Baronet of Cuckston
Baron Romney, 1716
Robert Shirley; 1668–1669; 6th Shirley Baronet of Staunton Harold	Robert Shirley; 1673–1699	Elizabeth Pelham; 1681–1711	Charles Townshend; 1674–1738; 2nd Viscount Townshend, etc.	Robert Marsham; 1685–1724; 1st Baron Romney, 5th Baronet of Cuckston
Elizabeth Compton; 1694–1741; 15th Baroness Ferrers of Chartley	Charles Townshend; 1700–1764; 3rd Viscount Townshend, etc.	Thomas Townshend; 1701–1780
Baron Ferrers of Chartley resolved, 1749	Marquess Townshend, 1787	Baron Sydney of Chiselhurst, 1783; Viscount Sydney (2nd creation) of St Leonards, 1789
Charlotte Townshend d. 1770; 16th Baroness Ferrers of Chartley, Baroness Compton	George Townshend; 1724–1807; 1st Marquess Townshend, 4th Viscount Townshend, etc.	Thomas Townshend; 1733–1800; 1st Viscount Sydney	Robert Marsham; 1712–1794; 2nd Baron Romney
Earl of Leicester (6th creation), 1784	Earl of Romney (2nd creation) and Viscount Marsham of The Mote, 1801
George Townshend; 1753–1811; 2nd Marquess Townshend, 1st Earl of Leicester, 5th Viscount Townshend, etc., 17th Baron Ferrers of Chartley, Baron Compton	John Townshend; 1757–1783	John Townshend; 1764–1831; 2nd Viscount Sydney	Charles Marsham; 1744–1811; 1st Earl of Romney, etc., 3rd Baron Romney
George Townshend; 1778–1885; 3rd Marquess Townshend, 2nd Earl of Leicester, 6th Viscount Townshend, etc., 18th Baron Ferrers of Chartley, Baron Compton	John Townshend; 1798–1863; 4th Marquess Townshend, 7th Viscount Townshend, etc.	Mary Elizabeth Marsham; 1794–1847	Charles Marsham; 1777–1845; 2nd Earl of Romney, etc., 4th Baron Romney
Barony Ferrers of Chartley and Barony Compton in abeyance and Earldom of Leicester (6th creation) extinct, 1885	Earl Sydney of Scadbury, 1874
John Townshend; 1805–1890; 1st Earl Sydney, 3rd Viscount Sydney	Charles Marsham; 1808–1874; 3nd Earl of Romney, etc., 5th Baron Romney
Earldom of Sydney extinct, 1890
John Villiers Stuart Townshend; 1831–1899; 5th Marquess Townshend, 8th Viscount Townshend, etc.	Charles Marsham; 1841–1905; 4th Earl of Romney, etc., 6th Baron Romney
John James Dudley Stuart Townshend; 1866–1921; 6th Marquess Townshend, 9th Viscount Townshend, etc.	Charles Marsham; 1864–1933; 5th Earl of Romney, etc., 7th Baron Romney	Reginald Hastings Marsham; 1865–1922	Sydney Edward Marsham; 1879–1952
George John Patrick Dominic Townshend; 1916–2010; 7th Marquess Townshend, 10th Viscount Townshend, etc.	Charles Marsham; 1892–1975; 6th Earl of Romney, etc., 8th Baron Romney	Michael Marsham; 1910–2004; 7th Earl of Romney, etc., 9th Baron Romney	Peter William Marsham; 1913–1970
Charles George Townshend; 1945–2025; 8th Marquess Townshend, 11th Viscount Townshend, etc.	Julian Marsham b. 1948; 8th Earl of Romney, etc., 9th Baron Romney
Thomas Charles Townshend b. 1977; 9th Marquess Townshend, 12th Viscount Townshend, etc.	David Charles Marsham b. 1977 styled Viscount Marsham
Heir apparent to the Earl of Romney
Rafe Thomas Townshend b. 2014 styled Viscount Raynham	James Julian Marsham b. 2014
Heir apparent to the Marquess of Townshend

Honorary titles
Preceded by Nigel Rudolph Savory	High Sheriff of Norfolk; 2007	Succeeded by The Viscountess Knollys of Norwich
Peerage of England
Preceded by Michael Marsham	Earl of Romney; 2004–present	Incumbent; Heir apparent: David Marsham, Viscount Marsham
