= Earl of Romney =

Earldom in the Peerage of the United Kingdom

Earl of Romney 2nd creation
- Arms of Marsham: Argent, a Lion passant Gules, between two Bendlets Azure. Crest: A Lion's Head erased Gules. Supporters: On either side a Lion Azure, semée of Crosses-Crosslet Or, gorged with a Naval Crown Or.
- Creation date: 22 June 1801; 225 years ago
- Creation: Second
- Created by: King George III
- Peerage: Peerage of the United Kingdom
- First holder: Charles Marsham, 1st Earl of Romney
- Present holder: Julian Marsham, 8th Earl of Romney
- Heir apparent: David Marsham, Viscount Marsham
- Subsidiary titles: Viscount Marsham; Baron Romney; Baronet 'of Cuchston'
- Status: Extant
- Seat: Gayton Hall
- Former seat: Mote House
- Motto: NON SIBI SED PATRIÆ (For country not self)

Earl of Romney 1st creation
- Arms of Sydney: Or, a Pheon Azure, a Crescent for difference. Crest: A Porcupine Azure, quilled, collared and chained Or, a Crescent for difference. Supporters: Dexter: A Lion Azure, collared and chained Or, ducally crowned per pale Argent and Gules, a Crescent for difference; Sinister: A Lion guardant Argent, ducally crowned Or, a Crescent for difference.
- Creation date: 8 April 1694; 332 years ago
- Creation: First
- Created by: William III and Mary II
- Peerage: Peerage of England
- First holder: Henry Sydney, 1st Earl of Romney
- Last holder: Henry Sydney, 1st Earl of Romney
- Subsidiary titles: Viscount Sydney; Baron Milton
- Status: Extinct
- Extinction date: 8 April 1704
- Motto: QUO FATA VOCANT (Whither the Fates call / Where destiny calls)

Earl of Romney (pronounced "Rumney") is a title that has been created twice.

It was first created in the Peerage of England in 1694 in favour of the soldier and politician Henry Sydney. He had been made Baron Milton and Viscount Sydney at the same time in 1689. Sydney was the younger son of Robert Sydney, 2nd Earl of Leicester. He never married and the titles became extinct on his death in 1704.

It was created for the second time in the Peerage of the United Kingdom in 1801 in favour of Charles Marsham, 3rd Baron Romney. The Marsham family descends from Sir John Marsham, one of the six Clerks of the Court of Chancery from 1638 to 1644 and from 1660 to 1680. In August 1663 he was created a Baronet, of Cuckston in the County of Kent, in the Baronetage of England. His grandson, the fourth Baronet (who succeeded his nephew), was also a Clerk of the Court of Chancery and represented Maidstone in the House of Commons. His son, the fifth Baronet, also sat as Member of Parliament for Maidstone and served as Governor of Dover Castle. In 1716 he was raised to the Peerage of Great Britain as Baron of Romney, of Romney in the County of Kent.

His grandson, the aforementioned third Baron, represented Maidstone and Kent in Parliament and served as Lord Lieutenant of Kent. In 1801 he was created Viscount Marsham, of The Mote in the County of Kent, and Earl of Romney, in the Peerage of the United Kingdom. He was succeeded by his son, the second Earl. He was Member of Parliament for Hythe and Downton. His son, the third Earl, represented Kent West in the House of Commons. He was succeeded by his son, the fourth Earl, who held political office in the second Conservative government of Lord Salisbury as a Lord-in-waiting (government whip in the House of Lords) from 1889 to 1892.

The line of his eldest son, the fifth Earl, failed on the death of the latter's son, the sixth Earl, in 1975. The late Earl was succeeded by his first cousin, the seventh Earl. He was the son of Lieutenant-Colonel Reginald Hastings Marsham, second son of the fourth Earl. As of 2010 the titles are held by his first cousin once removed, the eighth Earl, who succeeded in 2004. He is the son of Colonel Peter William Marsham, son of Sydney Edward Marsham, youngest son of the fourth Earl.

The family seat was at Mote House, near Maidstone, Kent, but since 1891 it has been the Gayton Hall Estate at Gayton near King's Lynn, Norfolk.

== Earls of Romney, first creation ==
Henry Sydney, 1st Earl of Romney

=== Viscounts Sydney (1689) ===
- Henry Sydney, 1st Viscount Sydney (1641–1704) (created Earl of Romney in 1694)

=== Earls of Romney (1694) ===
- Henry Sydney, 1st Earl of Romney (1641–1704)

== Earls of Romney, second creation ==
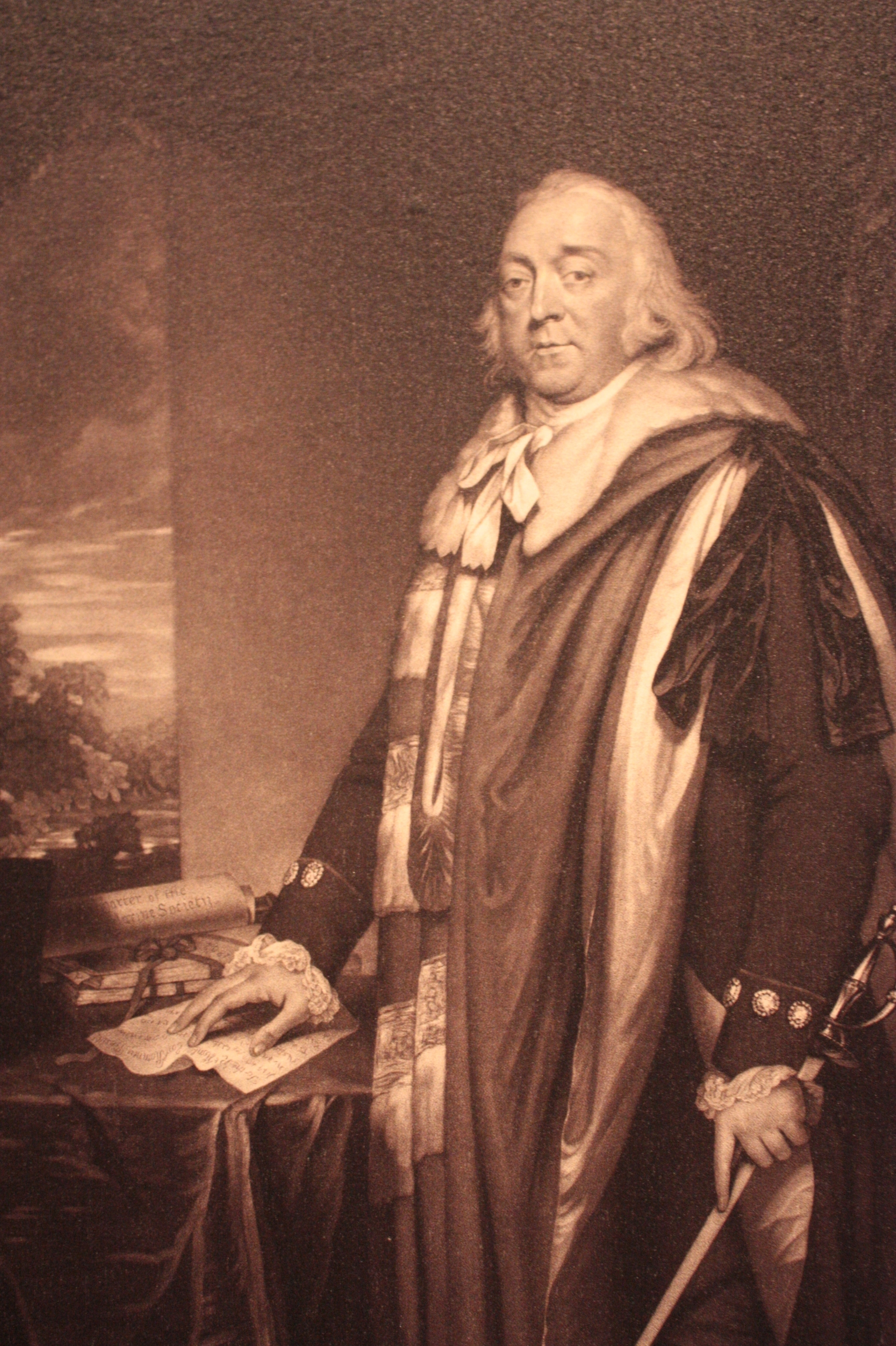
Charles Marsham, 1st Earl of Romney

=== Marsham baronets, of Cuckston (1663) ===
- Sir John Marsham, 1st Baronet (1602–1685)
- Sir John Marsham, 2nd Baronet (1637–1692)
- Sir John Marsham, 3rd Baronet (1679–1696)
- Sir Robert Marsham, 4th Baronet (1650–1703)
- Sir Robert Marsham, 5th Baronet (1685–1724) (created Baron Romney in 1716)

=== Barons Romney (1716) ===
- Robert Marsham, 1st Baron Romney (1685–1724)
- Robert Marsham, 2nd Baron Romney (1712–1794)
- Charles Marsham, 3rd Baron Romney (1744–1811) (created Viscount Marsham and Earl of Romney in 1801)

=== Earls of Romney (1801) ===
- Charles Marsham, 1st Earl of Romney (1744–1811)
- Charles Marsham, 2nd Earl of Romney (1777–1845)
- Charles Marsham, 3rd Earl of Romney (1808–1874)
- Charles Marsham, 4th Earl of Romney (1841–1905)
- Charles Marsham, 5th Earl of Romney (1864–1933)
- Charles Marsham, 6th Earl of Romney (1892–1975)
- Michael Henry Marsham, 7th Earl of Romney (1910–2004)
- Julian Charles Marsham, 8th Earl of Romney (b. 1948)

The heir apparent is the present holder's son, Lieutenant Colonel David Charles Marsham, Viscount Marsham (b. 1977), who served as commanding officer of 1st Battalion Coldstream Guards 2018–2023.
The heir apparent's heir apparent is his son, Hon. James Julian Marsham (b. 2014)

Marquesses Townshend, Earls of Romney, and Baronets of Cuckston

Shirley Baronet of Staunton Harold, 1611
George Shirley; 1559–1622; 1st Shirley Baronet of Staunton Harold
Baronet of Cuckston, 1663
Henry Shirley; 1589–1633; 2nd Shirley Baronet of Staunton Harold	Robert Sidney; 1595–1677; Earl of Leicester	John Marsham; 1602–1685; 1st Baronet of Cuckston
Earl of Romney (1st creation), 1694	Baron Townshend, of Lynn Regis, 1661; Viscount Townshend of Raynham, 1682
Charles Shirley (1623–1646); 3rd Shirley Baronet of Staunton Harold	Robert Shirley; 1629–1656; 4th Shirley Baronet of Staunton Harold	Lady Lucy Sidney; 1630–1685	Henry Sydney; 1641–1704; 1st Earl of Romney	Horatio Townshend; 1630–1687; 1st Viscount Townshend, etc.	John Marsham; 1637–1692; 2nd Baronet of Cuckston	Robert Marsham; 1650–1703; 4th Baronet of Cuckston
Earldom extinct, 1704
Baron Ferrers of Chartley abeyance terminated, 1677
Seymour Shirley; 1647–1667; 5th Shirley Baronet of Staunton Harold	Robert Shirley; 1650–1717; Earl Ferrers, 14th Baron Ferrers of Chartley, 7th Shirley Baronet, of Staunton Harold	Thomas Pelham; 1653–1712	John Marsham; 1679–1696; 3rd Baronet of Cuckston
Baron Romney, 1716
Robert Shirley; 1668–1669; 6th Shirley Baronet of Staunton Harold	Robert Shirley; 1673–1699	Elizabeth Pelham; 1681–1711	Charles Townshend; 1674–1738; 2nd Viscount Townshend, etc.	Robert Marsham; 1685–1724; 1st Baron Romney, 5th Baronet of Cuckston
Elizabeth Compton; 1694–1741; 15th Baroness Ferrers of Chartley	Charles Townshend; 1700–1764; 3rd Viscount Townshend, etc.	Thomas Townshend; 1701–1780
Baron Ferrers of Chartley resolved, 1749	Marquess Townshend, 1787	Baron Sydney of Chiselhurst, 1783; Viscount Sydney (2nd creation) of St Leonards, 1789
Charlotte Townshend d. 1770; 16th Baroness Ferrers of Chartley, Baroness Compton	George Townshend; 1724–1807; 1st Marquess Townshend, 4th Viscount Townshend, etc.	Thomas Townshend; 1733–1800; 1st Viscount Sydney	Robert Marsham; 1712–1794; 2nd Baron Romney
Earl of Leicester (6th creation), 1784	Earl of Romney (2nd creation) and Viscount Marsham of The Mote, 1801
George Townshend; 1753–1811; 2nd Marquess Townshend, 1st Earl of Leicester, 5th Viscount Townshend, etc., 17th Baron Ferrers of Chartley, Baron Compton	John Townshend; 1757–1783	John Townshend; 1764–1831; 2nd Viscount Sydney	Charles Marsham; 1744–1811; 1st Earl of Romney, etc., 3rd Baron Romney
George Townshend; 1778–1885; 3rd Marquess Townshend, 2nd Earl of Leicester, 6th Viscount Townshend, etc., 18th Baron Ferrers of Chartley, Baron Compton	John Townshend; 1798–1863; 4th Marquess Townshend, 7th Viscount Townshend, etc.	Mary Elizabeth Marsham; 1794–1847	Charles Marsham; 1777–1845; 2nd Earl of Romney, etc., 4th Baron Romney
Barony Ferrers of Chartley and Barony Compton in abeyance and Earldom of Leicester (6th creation) extinct, 1885	Earl Sydney of Scadbury, 1874
John Townshend; 1805–1890; 1st Earl Sydney, 3rd Viscount Sydney	Charles Marsham; 1808–1874; 3nd Earl of Romney, etc., 5th Baron Romney
Earldom of Sydney extinct, 1890
John Villiers Stuart Townshend; 1831–1899; 5th Marquess Townshend, 8th Viscount Townshend, etc.	Charles Marsham; 1841–1905; 4th Earl of Romney, etc., 6th Baron Romney
John James Dudley Stuart Townshend; 1866–1921; 6th Marquess Townshend, 9th Viscount Townshend, etc.	Charles Marsham; 1864–1933; 5th Earl of Romney, etc., 7th Baron Romney	Reginald Hastings Marsham; 1865–1922	Sydney Edward Marsham; 1879–1952
George John Patrick Dominic Townshend; 1916–2010; 7th Marquess Townshend, 10th Viscount Townshend, etc.	Charles Marsham; 1892–1975; 6th Earl of Romney, etc., 8th Baron Romney	Michael Marsham; 1910–2004; 7th Earl of Romney, etc., 9th Baron Romney	Peter William Marsham; 1913–1970
Charles George Townshend; 1945–2025; 8th Marquess Townshend, 11th Viscount Townshend, etc.	Julian Marsham b. 1948; 8th Earl of Romney, etc., 9th Baron Romney
Thomas Charles Townshend b. 1977; 9th Marquess Townshend, 12th Viscount Townshend, etc.	David Charles Marsham b. 1977 styled Viscount Marsham
Heir apparent to the Earl of Romney
Rafe Thomas Townshend b. 2014 styled Viscount Raynham	James Julian Marsham b. 2014
Heir apparent to the Marquess of Townshend

== See also ==
- Earl of Leicester (1618 creation)
- Henry FitzJames, illegitimate son of James II of England, created Duke of Albemarle with the subsidiary titles of Earl of Rochford and Baron Romney, by his father on 13 January 1696.
