= Marquess Townshend =

Title in the Peerage of Great Britain

Marquessate of Townshend
- Blazon Arms: Quarterly, 1st and 4th, Azure, a chevron ermine between three escallops argent (Townshend); 2nd and 3rd, quarterly gules and or, in the first quarter a mullet argent, in the centre a crescent sable (Vere). Crest: A stag statant proper, attired and unguled or. Supporters: Dexter, A stag sable, attired and unguled or; Sinister, A greyhound argent.
- Creation date: 31 October 1787
- Created by: George III
- Peerage: Great Britain
- First holder: George Townshend, 4th Viscount Townshend
- Present holder: Thomas Townshend, 9th Marquess Townshend
- Heir apparent: Rafe Townshend, Viscount Raynham
- Remainder to: The 1st Marquess' heirs male of the body lawfully begotten
- Subsidiary titles: Viscount Townshend, of Raynham; Baron Townshend, of Lynn Regis; Baronet 'of Raynham'
- Seat: Raynham Hall
- Motto: Haec Generi Incrementa Fides (Faith obtained these honours for our race)

Marquess Townshend /ˈtaʊnzənd/ is a title in the Peerage of Great Britain held by the Townshend family of Raynham Hall in Norfolk. The title was created in 1787 for George Townshend, 4th Viscount Townshend.

== History ==
The Townshend family descends from Roger Townshend, who in 1617 was created a baronet, of Raynham in the County of Norfolk, in the Baronetage of England. He later represented Orford and Norfolk in the House of Commons. His younger son, the third Baronet (who succeeded his elder brother), played an important role in the restoration of the monarchy after the Civil War and was also Member of Parliament for Norfolk. In 1661 he was created Baron Townshend, of Lynn Regis in the County of Norfolk, and in 1682 he was further honoured when he was made Viscount Townshend, of Raynham in the County of Norfolk. Both titles were in the Peerage of England.

He was succeeded by his son, the second Viscount. He was a prominent statesman and served as Secretary of State for the Northern Department from 1714 to 1716 and from 1721 to 1730. Lord Townshend is also remembered for the agricultural reforms he undertook at his Norfolk estate and gained the nickname "Turnip Townshend". His eldest son, the third Viscount, briefly represented Great Yarmouth in the House of Commons. However, in 1723, during his father's lifetime, he was summoned to the House of Lords through a writ of acceleration in his father's junior title of Baron Townshend (although he was styled "Lord Lynn", taken from the territorial designation of the barony, to distinguish him from his father). Lord Townshend later served as Lord Lieutenant of Norfolk.

He was succeeded by his eldest son, the fourth Viscount. He was a Field Marshal in the Army and served as Lord Lieutenant of Ireland and as Master-General of the Ordnance. In 1787 he was created Marquess Townshend in the Peerage of Great Britain. Lord Townshend married as his first wife Charlotte Compton, 16th Baroness Ferrers of Chartley and 7th Baroness Compton. He was succeeded by his eldest son, the second Marquess. He had already on his mother's death in 1770 succeeded in the baronies Ferrers of Chartley and Compton. In 1784, 23 years before he succeeded his father, he was created Earl of Leicester in the Peerage of Great Britain. His choice of title derived from his descent from Lady Lucy Sydney, daughter of Robert Sidney, 2nd Earl of Leicester (a title which had become extinct in 1743). Lord Townshend later held office as Master of the Mint, as Joint Postmaster General and as Lord Steward of the Household.

His son, the third Marquess, was childless. On his death in 1855 the earldom of Leicester became extinct while the baronies of Ferrers of Chartley and Compton fell into abeyance. He was succeeded in the other titles by his first cousin, the fourth Marquess. He was the son of Lord John Townshend, second son of the first Marquess. Lord Townshend was a Rear-Admiral in the Royal Navy and also sat as Member of Parliament for Tamworth. His son, the fifth Marquess, also represented Tamworth in Parliament (as a Liberal). Both the fifth Marquess and his only son, the sixth Marquess, became significantly indebted, necessitating the sale of portions of the family estates and financial interventions, which proved successful. On the death of the sixth Marquess in 1921, he was succeeded by his only son, the seventh Marquess, who was then only five years old. He served as chairman of Anglia Television from 1958 to 1986. As of 2025 the titles are held by the latter's grandson, the ninth Marquess, who succeeded his father in November 2025.

Several other members of the Townshend family have also gained distinction. Charles Townshend, second son of the third Viscount, was a prominent statesman and orator and served as Chancellor of the Exchequer from 1766 to 1767. The politician Thomas Townshend, 1st Viscount Sydney, after whom the town of Sydney, Australia, was named, was the son of the Hon. Thomas Townshend, second son of the second Viscount. Sydney's grandson was the Liberal politician John Townshend, 1st Earl Sydney. Charles Townshend, 1st Baron Bayning, was the son of the Hon. William Townshend, third son of the second Viscount. See also Roger Townshend, Admiral George Townshend, Lord Charles Townshend, Lord John Townshend, Lord Charles Townshend, Lord James Townshend, Charles Fox Townshend and Major-General Sir Charles Vere Ferrers Townshend.

As Lord Townshend holds no titles with names different from his main title, the territorial designation from his viscountcy is used for his heir, who is styled Viscount Raynham. Between 1807 and 1855 the courtesy title was Earl of Leicester (although the title was not used from 1811 to 1855 as there was no a real heir apparent to the marquessate during this period, but earldom "usurped" by John Dunn-Gardner in 1823–1843), while from 1782 to 1855 the courtesy title used by the heir apparent to the earldom of Leicester was Lord Ferrers of Chartley (and consequently was not used from 1811 to 1855 as there was no a real heir apparent either to the earldom or marquessate).

The current Marquess holds several subsidiary titles: Viscount Townshend, of Raynham in the County of Norfolk (created 1682); Baron Townshend, of Lynn Regis in the County of Norfolk (created 1661); Townshend Baronet, 'of Raynham in the County of Norfolk' (created 1617), all of which are in the Peerage of England. As noted above, due to being of the same name as the primary title, the Viscountcy has been called "Viscount Raynham" and the Barony "Baron Lynn".

The family seat is Raynham Hall, Fakenham, Norfolk.

== Townshend baronets, of Raynham (1617) ==
- Sir Roger Townshend, 1st Baronet (1596–1637)
- Sir Roger Townshend, 2nd Baronet (1628–1648)
- Sir Horatio Townshend, 3rd Baronet (1630–1687) (created Baron Townshend in 1661)

== Barons Townshend (1661) ==
- Sir Horatio Townshend, 1st Baron Townshend (1630–1687) (created Viscount Townshend in 1682)

== Viscounts Townshend (1682) ==
Arms of the Viscounts Townshend

- Horatio Townshend, 1st Viscount Townshend (1630–1687)
- Charles Townshend, 2nd Viscount Townshend (1674–1738)
- Charles Townshend, 3rd Viscount Townshend (1700–1764)
- George Townshend, 4th Viscount Townshend (1724–1807) (created Marquess Townshend in 1787)

== Marquesses Townshend (1787) ==
- George Townshend, 1st Marquess Townshend (1724–1807)
- George Townshend, 2nd Marquess Townshend, 1st Earl of Leicester (1753–1811)
- George Ferrars Townshend, 3rd Marquess Townshend, 2nd Earl of Leicester (1778–1855)
- John Townshend, 4th Marquess Townshend (1798–1863)
- John Villiers Stuart Townshend, 5th Marquess Townshend (1831–1899)
- John James Dudley Stuart Townshend, 6th Marquess Townshend (1866–1921)
- George John Patrick Dominic Townshend, 7th Marquess Townshend (1916–2010)
- Charles George Townshend, 8th Marquess Townshend (1945–2025)
- Thomas Charles Townshend, 9th Marquess Townshend (born 1977)

== Family tree ==
Marquesses Townshend, Earls of Romney, and Baronets of Cuckston

Shirley Baronet of Staunton Harold, 1611
George Shirley; 1559–1622; 1st Shirley Baronet of Staunton Harold
Baronet of Cuckston, 1663
Henry Shirley; 1589–1633; 2nd Shirley Baronet of Staunton Harold	Robert Sidney; 1595–1677; Earl of Leicester	John Marsham; 1602–1685; 1st Baronet of Cuckston
Earl of Romney (1st creation), 1694	Baron Townshend, of Lynn Regis, 1661; Viscount Townshend of Raynham, 1682
Charles Shirley (1623–1646); 3rd Shirley Baronet of Staunton Harold	Robert Shirley; 1629–1656; 4th Shirley Baronet of Staunton Harold	Lady Lucy Sidney; 1630–1685	Henry Sydney; 1641–1704; 1st Earl of Romney	Horatio Townshend; 1630–1687; 1st Viscount Townshend, etc.	John Marsham; 1637–1692; 2nd Baronet of Cuckston	Robert Marsham; 1650–1703; 4th Baronet of Cuckston
Earldom extinct, 1704
Baron Ferrers of Chartley abeyance terminated, 1677
Seymour Shirley; 1647–1667; 5th Shirley Baronet of Staunton Harold	Robert Shirley; 1650–1717; Earl Ferrers, 14th Baron Ferrers of Chartley, 7th Shirley Baronet, of Staunton Harold	Thomas Pelham; 1653–1712	John Marsham; 1679–1696; 3rd Baronet of Cuckston
Baron Romney, 1716
Robert Shirley; 1668–1669; 6th Shirley Baronet of Staunton Harold	Robert Shirley; 1673–1699	Elizabeth Pelham; 1681–1711	Charles Townshend; 1674–1738; 2nd Viscount Townshend, etc.	Robert Marsham; 1685–1724; 1st Baron Romney, 5th Baronet of Cuckston
Elizabeth Compton; 1694–1741; 15th Baroness Ferrers of Chartley	Charles Townshend; 1700–1764; 3rd Viscount Townshend, etc.	Thomas Townshend; 1701–1780
Baron Ferrers of Chartley resolved, 1749	Marquess Townshend, 1787	Baron Sydney of Chiselhurst, 1783; Viscount Sydney (2nd creation) of St Leonards, 1789
Charlotte Townshend d. 1770; 16th Baroness Ferrers of Chartley, Baroness Compton	George Townshend; 1724–1807; 1st Marquess Townshend, 4th Viscount Townshend, etc.	Thomas Townshend; 1733–1800; 1st Viscount Sydney	Robert Marsham; 1712–1794; 2nd Baron Romney
Earl of Leicester (6th creation), 1784	Earl of Romney (2nd creation) and Viscount Marsham of The Mote, 1801
George Townshend; 1753–1811; 2nd Marquess Townshend, 1st Earl of Leicester, 5th Viscount Townshend, etc., 17th Baron Ferrers of Chartley, Baron Compton	John Townshend; 1757–1783	John Townshend; 1764–1831; 2nd Viscount Sydney	Charles Marsham; 1744–1811; 1st Earl of Romney, etc., 3rd Baron Romney
George Townshend; 1778–1885; 3rd Marquess Townshend, 2nd Earl of Leicester, 6th Viscount Townshend, etc., 18th Baron Ferrers of Chartley, Baron Compton	John Townshend; 1798–1863; 4th Marquess Townshend, 7th Viscount Townshend, etc.	Mary Elizabeth Marsham; 1794–1847	Charles Marsham; 1777–1845; 2nd Earl of Romney, etc., 4th Baron Romney
Barony Ferrers of Chartley and Barony Compton in abeyance and Earldom of Leicester (6th creation) extinct, 1885	Earl Sydney of Scadbury, 1874
John Townshend; 1805–1890; 1st Earl Sydney, 3rd Viscount Sydney	Charles Marsham; 1808–1874; 3nd Earl of Romney, etc., 5th Baron Romney
Earldom of Sydney extinct, 1890
John Villiers Stuart Townshend; 1831–1899; 5th Marquess Townshend, 8th Viscount Townshend, etc.	Charles Marsham; 1841–1905; 4th Earl of Romney, etc., 6th Baron Romney
John James Dudley Stuart Townshend; 1866–1921; 6th Marquess Townshend, 9th Viscount Townshend, etc.	Charles Marsham; 1864–1933; 5th Earl of Romney, etc., 7th Baron Romney	Reginald Hastings Marsham; 1865–1922	Sydney Edward Marsham; 1879–1952
George John Patrick Dominic Townshend; 1916–2010; 7th Marquess Townshend, 10th Viscount Townshend, etc.	Charles Marsham; 1892–1975; 6th Earl of Romney, etc., 8th Baron Romney	Michael Marsham; 1910–2004; 7th Earl of Romney, etc., 9th Baron Romney	Peter William Marsham; 1913–1970
Charles George Townshend; 1945–2025; 8th Marquess Townshend, 11th Viscount Townshend, etc.	Julian Marsham b. 1948; 8th Earl of Romney, etc., 9th Baron Romney
Thomas Charles Townshend b. 1977; 9th Marquess Townshend, 12th Viscount Townshend, etc.	David Charles Marsham b. 1977 styled Viscount Marsham
Heir apparent to the Earl of Romney
Rafe Thomas Townshend b. 2014 styled Viscount Raynham	James Julian Marsham b. 2014
Heir apparent to the Marquess of Townshend

== Present peer ==
Thomas Charles Townshend, 9th Marquess Townshend (born 2 November 1977), is the son of the 8th Marquess and his first wife Hermione Ponsonby (d. 1985). He was styled as Viscount Raynham from birth and was educated at Oundle School and the Royal Agricultural College, Cirencester.

On 20 November 2025, he succeeded as Marquess Townshend (G.B., 1787), Viscount Townshend of Raynham (E., 1682), and Baron Townshend of Lynn Regis (E., 1682), and also became the 14th Townshend baronet, of Rainham, Norfolk (1617).

In 2011, he married Octavia Christina Legge, daughter of Christopher David Legge, and they have had two children:

- Rafe Thomas Townshend, Viscount Raynham (born 2014)
- Lady Hermione Sarah Townshend (born 2016)

Townshend still lives at the family seat, Raynham Hall. The heir apparent is his son Rafe Thomas Townshend, Viscount Raynham (born 2014).

Line of succession
- George Townshend, 1st Marquess Townshend (1724–1807)
  - George Townshend, 2nd Marquess Townshend (1755-1811)
    - George Ferrers Townshend, 3rd Marquess Townshend (1778-1855)
  - Lord John Townshend (1757–1833)
    - John Townshend, 4th Marquess Townshend (1798–1863)
      - John Townshend, 5th Marquess Townshend (1831–1899)
        - John Townshend, 6th Marquess Townshend (1866–1921)
          - George Townshend, 7th Marquess Townshend (1916–2010)
            - Charles Townshend, 8th Marquess Townshend (1945–2025)
              - Thomas Townshend, 9th Marquess Townshend (born 1977)
                - (1). Rafe Thomas Townshend, Viscount Raynham (born 2014)
            - (2). Lord John Patrick Townshend (born 1962)
              - (3). George Townshend (born 2003)
    - Rev. Lord George Osborne Townshend (1801–1876)
      - George Ferrars Townshend (1854–1942)
        - Ferrars Ernest Osborne Townshend (1882–1953)
          - Henry George Townshend (1911–1979)
            - Ferrars Edwin Townshend (1944–2017)
              - male issue in remainder
      - Ernest Edwin Townshend (1858–1945)
        - Clifford Edwin Townshend (1884–1958)
          - John Edwin Townshend (1918–1990)
            - male issue in remainder
          - George Maling Townshend (1921–2009)
            - male issue in remainder
          - Charles Roberts Townshend (1926–1987)
            - male issue in remainder

== See also ==
- Earl Sydney
- Baron Bayning
- Baron Compton
- Earl of Leicester (1618 creation)

== Notes ==
Baronetage of England
Preceded by Egerton baronets	Townshend baronets 16 April 1617	Succeeded by Clarke baronets
