= John Marsham =

John Marsham may refer to:

- Sir John Marsham, 1st Baronet, English antiquary
- Sir John Marsham, 2nd Baronet (1637–1692), of the Marsham baronets
- Sir John Marsham, 3rd Baronet (1679–1696), of the Marsham baronets
- John Marsham (cricketer), English clergyman and amateur cricketer
