= St Nicholas Church, Gayton =

St Nicholas Church
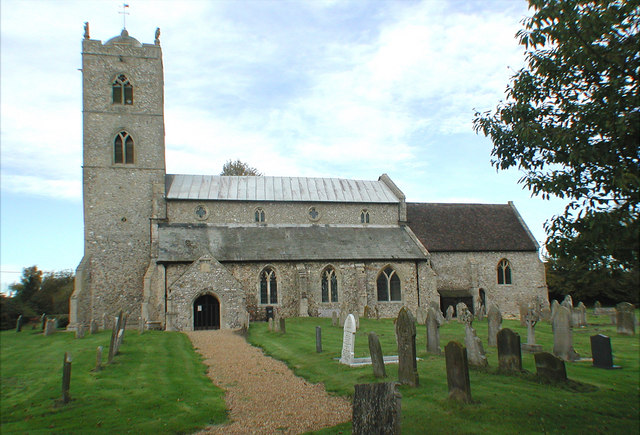
- St Nicholas Church
- 52.7433°N 0.5617°E
- Location: Gayton, Norfolk, England
- Country: UK
- Denomination: Church of England
- Website: www.ggmbenefice.uk

History
- Dedication: 1604

Architecture
- Designated: 15 August 1960

St. Nicholas' Church is a medieval, Anglican church located in Gayton, in the English county of Norfolk.

St. Nicholas' dates from the Fourteenth Century and has been Grade I listed since 1960.

== Exterior ==
St. Nicholas' is built of flint with lime mortar, which suggests that the church was not expanded in the Fourteenth Century as many of Norfolk's churches were due to the prosperous trade in wool.

The domed crest of the church tower is visible from most of the roads approaching the village and has an emblem of the four evangelists on each corner. The depictions of include a winged man for Saint Matthew, a lion for Saint Mark, an ox for Saint Luke and an eagle for Saint John the Baptist.

== Interior ==
St. Nicholas has a Fourteenth Century font and a modern sculpture by the Swedish artist, Britt Wikstrom depicting Jacob wrestling with the angel.

The reredos were carved during the First World War by a refugee from Belgium using wood from an oak tree grown in the grounds of Gayton Hall.

In 2023, the Nineteenth Century wooden benches were removed due to woodworm and were replaced with more modern seating.

There is also a memorial in the church to Captain Douglas H. Marsham who was killed serving with the British South Africa Police at the Siege of Mafeking.

== Church Life ==
Today, St. Nicholas' is part of the Benefice of Gayton, Grimston & Great Massingham and though it remains open daily, does not hold regular church services. The priest for St. Nicholas' is the Reverend Jane Holmes.

In September 2013, James Meade, the son of equestrian champion Richard Meade, and Lady Laura Marsham, daughter of Julian Charles Marsham, 8th Earl of Romney, who lives in nearby Gayton Hall, got married in this church. Prince William, Duke of Cambridge, Prince Harry and Pippa Middleton were in attendance at the wedding.

== Gallery ==
St Nicholas Church
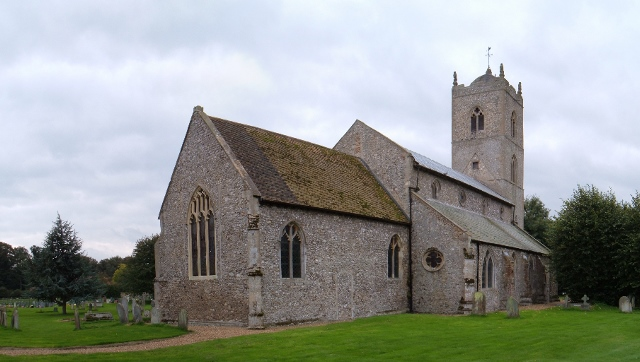
Rear view of St Nicholas Church

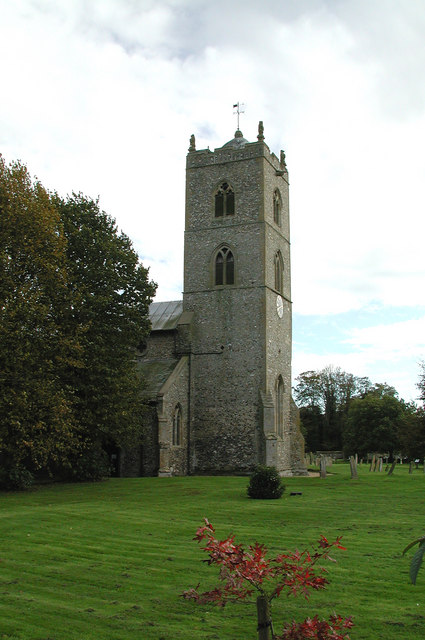
Tower of St Nicholas Church

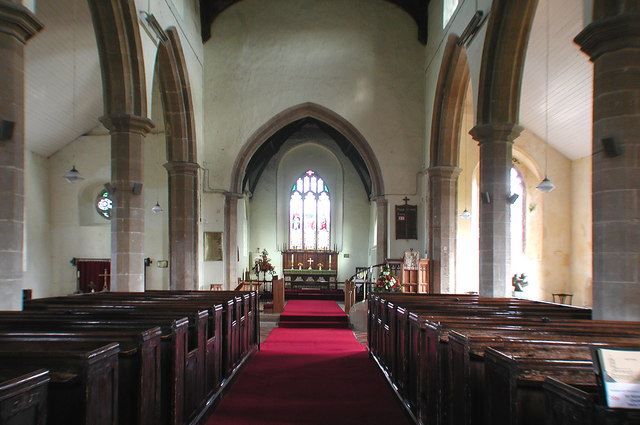
Inside St Nicholas Church
