= Charles Fox Townshend =

Charles Fox Townshend (28 June 1795 – 1817) was the founder of the Eton Society.

Townshend was the eldest son of Lord John Townshend, second son of George Townshend, 1st Marquess Townshend. His mother was Georgiana Anne, daughter of William Poyntz, while George Townshend, 2nd Marquess Townshend, was his uncle. His name derived from his father's close friend Charles James Fox. He was educated at Eton and St John's College, Cambridge. While a student at Eton in 1811 Townshend founded the Eton Society, a debating society which later became known as "Pop". In 1817 he stood as a candidate for Cambridge University but died before the elections took place. He never married. Townshend's younger brother John succeeded his cousin in the marquessate of Townshend in 1855.

== See also ==
- Marquess Townshend
