= Joan Marsham =

British philanthropist

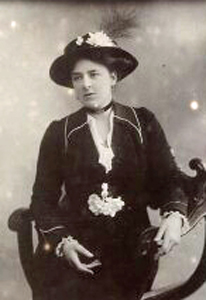
- Dame (Muriel) Joan Marsham (née Warry), 1913
- Born: Muriel Joan Warry; 4 January 1888; Marylebone, London, England, UK
- Died: 13 March 1972 (aged 84); London, England, UK
- Occupation: Philanthropist
- Known for: Chairman of the executive committee of the Girl Guides Association
- Parents: William Taylor Warry (1836-1906) (father); Eliza Jane Gosling (1851-1935) (mother)
- Awards: Silver Fish Award

Dame Muriel Joan Marsham (née Warry; 4 January 1888 – 13 March 1972), DBE, was a British philanthropist and chairman of the executive committee of the Girl Guides Association from 1938 to 1948. She was Chair of the National Women's Auxiliary of the Young Men's Christian Association (founded in Britain in 1918) from 1931 until her death in 1972.

== Background ==
Born as Muriel Joan Warry, the daughter of William Warry of Shapwick, Somerset, England, she married the Hon. Sydney Edward Marsham (son of Charles Marsham, 4th Earl of Romney and Lady Frances Augusta Constance Muir Rawdon-Hastings) on 2 February 1911. The couple had one child.

== Honours ==
She was awarded the OBE and later was elevated to DBE in 1945 "for public services".

She was awarded the Silver Fish Award, Girl Guiding's highest adult honour, in 1944.

== Family ==
- Husband: Hon. Sydney Edward Marsham (b. 29 December 1879 — d. 6 January 1952)
- Child: Lt.-Col. Peter William Marsham (b. 8 June 1913 — d. 3 November 1970)

married, in 1946, to Hersey (née Coke; 1915 — 2012) and had the following children:

  - Julian Charles Marsham, 8th Earl of Romney (b. 28 March 1948)
  - Lady Lavinia Marsham (b. 6 February 1950)
  - Lady Sarah Marsham (b. 3 October 1954)
  - Davinia Marsham (b. 13 February 1956 - d. 22 May 1956)
