= Gayton Hall =

Country house near King's Lynn, Norfolk

Coordinates: 52.7408649°N 0.5632101°W

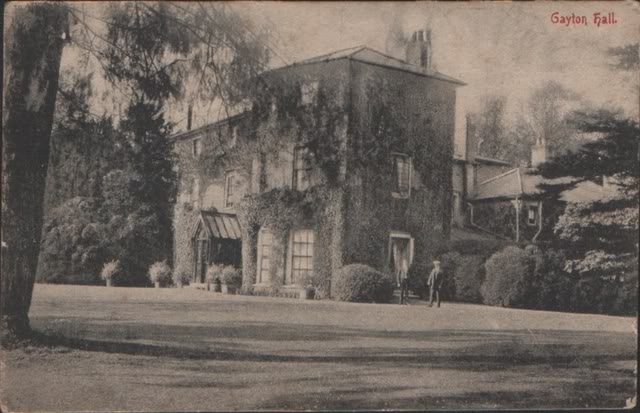
Gayton Hall

Gayton Hall is a country house in the parish of Gayton near King's Lynn in Norfolk.

== History ==
The present building was built between 1803 and 1810 by Andrew St John and remained in the ownership of the St John family, although tenanted. It was rented by Charles Marsham, 4th Earl of Romney in 1879 who later bought it and the surrounding estate in 1891. It has been passed down the Romney family and remains the seat of the present earl, Julian Charles Marsham, 8th Earl of Romney. The gardens are open to the public.
