= Bushey Hall =

Coordinates: 51°40′N 0°23′W

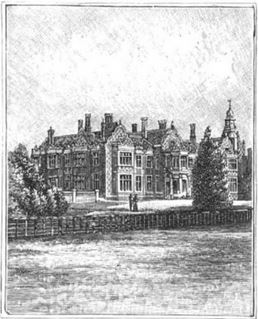
Bushey Hall Hydrotherapeutic Institute

Bushey Hall was an English historic house in Hertfordshire. It was built in 1428 for Thomas Montacute, 4th Earl of Salisbury. It was also the home of Sir John Marsham, 1st Baronet.

In 1881, a hydrotherapeutic institute was opened in its 250 acres of parkland. The establishment, under the supervision of Resident Physician, Dr Robert J Banning, offered a wide range of facilities including Victorian Turkish, Russian steam, electric, pine, and swimming baths. Treatments included massage.

The manor house was demolished in the nineteenth century, and a nearby Bushey Hall, built on a different site, was demolished after World War II.
