= Charles Marsham, 4th Earl of Romney =

British Conservative politician

Personal details
- Born: 7 March 1841
- Died: 21 August 1905 (aged 64)
- Party: Conservative
- Spouse: Frances Rawdon-Hastings (m. 1863)
- Children: 5
- Parent: Charles Marsham (father)
- Relatives: Michael Marsham (grandson); Charles Marsham (grandfather); Sophia Pitt (grandmother); Charles Montagu-Scott (grandfather)

Charles Marsham, 4th Earl of Romney (7 March 1841 – 21 August 1905), styled Viscount Marsham from 1845 to 1874, was a British Conservative politician.

== Early life ==
Romney was the son of Charles Marsham, 3rd Earl of Romney and his wife Lady Margaret Harriet Montagu-Scott, daughter of Charles Montagu-Scott, 4th Duke of Buccleuch.

His ancestors came from the parish of Marsham, Norfolk, in the 12th century.

== Career ==
He succeeded his father in the earldom in 1874.

He served as a Lord-in-waiting (government whip in the House of Lords) from 1889 to 1892 in the Conservative administration of Lord Salisbury.

== Personal life ==
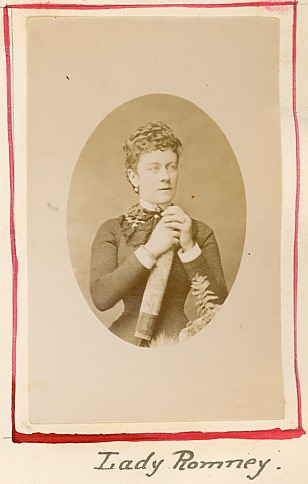
Photograph of Lady Romney

On 30 July 1863, Romney married Lady Frances Augusta Constance Muir Rawdon-Hastings (1844–1910), a daughter of George Rawdon-Hastings, 2nd Marquess of Hastings and Barbara Yelverton, 20th Baroness Grey of Ruthyn. Together, they had five children:

- Charles Marsham, 5th Earl of Romney (1864–1933), father of Charles Marsham, 6th Earl of Romney.
- Lt Col the Hon Reginald Hastings Marsham, OBE (1865–1922), father of Michael Marsham, 7th Earl of Romney
- Lady Florence Mary Constance Marsham (born 9 February 1868, died 4 October 1954), who married Sir George Ralph Leigh Hare, 3rd Bt and had issue including Sir Ralph Leigh Hare, 4th Bt. They were also the paternal grandparents of Sir Thomas Hare, 5th Baronet.
- Lt the Hon Douglas Henry Marsham (1871–1899), who was killed in action at the Siege of Mafeking; he died unmarried. There is a memorial tablet in St Nicholas' Church, Gayton, Norfolk.
- Hon Sydney Edward Marsham (1879–1952), husband of Joan Marsham and grandfather of Julian Marsham, 8th Earl of Romney

Lord Romney died in August 1905, aged 64, and was succeeded in the earldom by his eldest son Charles. Lady Romney died on 1 September 1910, aged 66.

== Notes ==
Peerage of the United Kingdom
Preceded by Charles Marsham	Earl of Romney; 1874–1905	Succeeded by Charles Marsham
