= Robert Marsham, 1st Baron Romney =

British politician (1685 – 1724)

Member of Parliament for Maidstone
- In office 1708–1716

Personal details
- Born: 17 September 1685
- Died: 28 November 1724 (aged 39)
- Party: Whig
- Spouse: Elizabeth Shovell (m. 1708)
- Children: 2, including Robert
- Parent: Robert Marsham (father)
- Relatives: Charles Marsham (grandson); John Marsham (grandfather)
- Education: St John's College, Oxford

Robert Marsham, 1st Baron Romney (17 September 1685 – 28 November 1724) of The Mote, Maidstone, known as Sir Robert Marsham, Bt between 1703 and 1716, was an English Whig politician who sat in the House of Commons from 1708 to 1716 when he was raised to the peerage as Baron Romney.

== Early life ==
Marsham was the son of Sir Robert Marsham, 4th Baronet of Bushey Hall, Hertfordshire, and his wife Margaret Bosvile, daughter of Thomas Bosvile of Little Motte, Eynsford, Kent. His father was a former MP for Maidstone. Margaret, granddaughter of Sir Francis Wyatt, was heir to the Wyatt family seat and passed Boxley Manor to her son. He matriculated at St John's College, Oxford on 9 August 1701, aged 15 and succeeded his father in the baronetcy on 26 July 1703.

== Career ==
Marsham was appointed as J.P. by February 1707. He was returned in a contest as Member of Parliament (MP) for Maidstone at the 1708 British general election. He supported the naturalization of the Palatines in 1709, and voted for the impeachment of Dr Sacheverell in 1710. At the 1710 British general election he was returned again in a contest. He was one of the Members ordered to draft a bill to ascertain the tithe of hops and presented it on 10 May 1710, but it made no further progress. He continually opposed the Tory administration throughout the Parliament, voting against an amendment to the South Sea bill on 15 May 1711, and for the "No Peace Without Spain" motion on 7 December 1711. On 18 June 1713 he voted against the French commerce bill. He was returned again for Maidstone at the 1713 British general election. He was a member of the Hanover Club and voted against the expulsion of Richard Steele on 18 March 1714. When Queen Anne died, he was a signatory to the proclamation of her successor.

Marsham was returned again at the 1715 British general election. After a short while, he was raised to the peerage as Baron Romney, of Romney in the County of Kent, on 22 June 1716 and vacated his seat in the House of Commons to sit in the House of Lords. He was constituted Lieutenant-governor of Dover Castle in 1717. In 1723, he was elected a Fellow of the Royal Society.

The family seat of the Marshams was Mote Park in Kent.

== Marriage and children ==
Romney married Elizabeth Shovell, daughter of Admiral of the Fleet Sir Cloudesley Shovell, at the Chapel Royal, Whitehall, on 19 August 1708. They had two children:

- Hon Elizabeth Marsham (born 15 August 1711, died 25 September 1782). Married Jacob Bouverie, 1st Viscount Folkestone on 12 April 1741 and had issue.
- Robert Marsham, 2nd Baron Romney (born 22 August 1712, died 16 November 1793). Married Priscilla, daughter and heiress of Charles Pym. The couple had at least five children:
  - Charles Marsham, 1st Earl of Romney (28 September 1744 – 1 March 1811).
  - Hon. Frances Marsham (b. 2 April 1755).
  - Hon. Chauvel Marsham (b. 22 October 1757).
  - Hon. Jacob Marsham (b. 1 March 1759).
  - Hon. Charlotte Marsham (b. 12 November 1761).

Romney died on 28 November 1724, aged 39, and was buried in Crayford, Kent. He was succeeded in the barony by his only son, Robert.

Lady Romney married as her second husband John Carmichael, 3rd Earl of Hyndford and died in November 1750, aged 58.

Parliament of Great Britain
Preceded by Thomas Bliss; Sir Thomas Culpeper, Bt	Member of Parliament for Maidstone; 1708–1716; With: Sir Thomas Culpeper, Bt 1708–1713; Samuel Ongley 1713–1716	Succeeded by Barnham Rider; Sir Thomas Culpeper, Bt
Baronetage of England
Preceded by Robert Marsham	Baronet (of Cuckston); 1703 – 1724	Succeeded by Robert Marsham
Peerage of Great Britain
New creation	Baron Romney; 1716–1724	Succeeded by Robert Marsham
