= Michael Marsham, 7th Earl of Romney =

British hereditary peer

The Right Honourable The Earl of Romney
- Born: 22 November 1910; Washpit Farm, Rougham, Norfolk, England
- Died: 5 June 2004 (aged 93); Wensum Farm, West Rudham, Norfolk, England
- Education: Sherborne School
- Occupation: Hereditary peer
- Title: Earl
- Spouse: Aileen Landale
- Relatives: Charles Marsham, 4th Earl of Romney (paternal grandfather); Charles Marsham, 6th Earl of Romney (first cousin); Julian Marsham, 8th Earl of Romney (first cousin once removed)

Michael Henry Marsham, 7th Earl of Romney (22 November 1910 – 5 June 2004), was a British hereditary peer who served in the House of Lords.

== Early life ==
Michael Henry Marsham was born on 22 November 1910 at Washpit Farm on the Rougham Hall Estate of the North family, at Rougham near King's Lynn in Norfolk, England. His father was Reginald Hastings Marsham (1865–1922), the second son of Charles Marsham, 4th Earl of Romney, who was thus his paternal grandfather, and his mother was Dora Hermione North (d. 1923). He became an orphan at the age of twelve.

He was educated at Sherborne School, a private boarding school in Sherborne, Dorset, in south-west England affiliated with the Church of England.

== Career ==
He worked as the manager of an estate owned by Shane O'Neill, 3rd Baron O'Neill, in Randalstown, County Antrim, Northern Ireland. He collected rents from the Roman Catholic tenants who lived on the estate.

During World War II, he served as a Major in the Royal Artillery of the British Army and was stationed in County Londonderry.

He returned to his job as an estate manager shortly after the war in 1945, staying until 1963. It was then that it became apparent that he would inherit the Earldom, and he returned to Norfolk where the Earls of Romney have a country estate at Gayton Hall.

He inherited his titles (Baron Romney, Viscount Marsham and Earl of Romney) from his first cousin, Charles Marsham, 6th Earl of Romney, in 1975, at the age of sixty. As a result, he served as a hereditary peer in the House of Lords from 1975 to 1999, when he lost his seat in the House as a result of the House of Lords Act 1999. Even though he served in the House for twenty-five years, he never made a speech. He was interviewed in The Lord's Tale, a television documentary directed by Molly Dineen about hereditary peers. In the documentary, he joked that nobody cared about his views, but that the Conservative Party was happy to have his vote on their side.

A keen fox hunter, he served as the Hon. Secretary of the West Norfolk Foxhounds for many years. He also took part in the Countryside March organised by the Countryside Alliance in September 2002, when 400,000 people marched in central London to stand up for the interests of rural Britain. He was the President of The Marine Society until his death.

== Personal life ==
He married Aileen Landale in 1939. His wife died in 1995. They had no children.

== Death ==
He died on 5 June 2004 at his home Wensum Farm, West Rudham, Norfolk. He was ninety-three years old. His title was inherited by Julian Marsham, his first cousin once removed.

Peerage of the United Kingdom
Preceded by Charles Marsham	Earl of Romney; 1975–2004; Member of the House of Lords (1975–1999)	Succeeded by Julian Marsham
