= Earl Sydney =

Extinct earldom in the Peerage of the United Kingdom

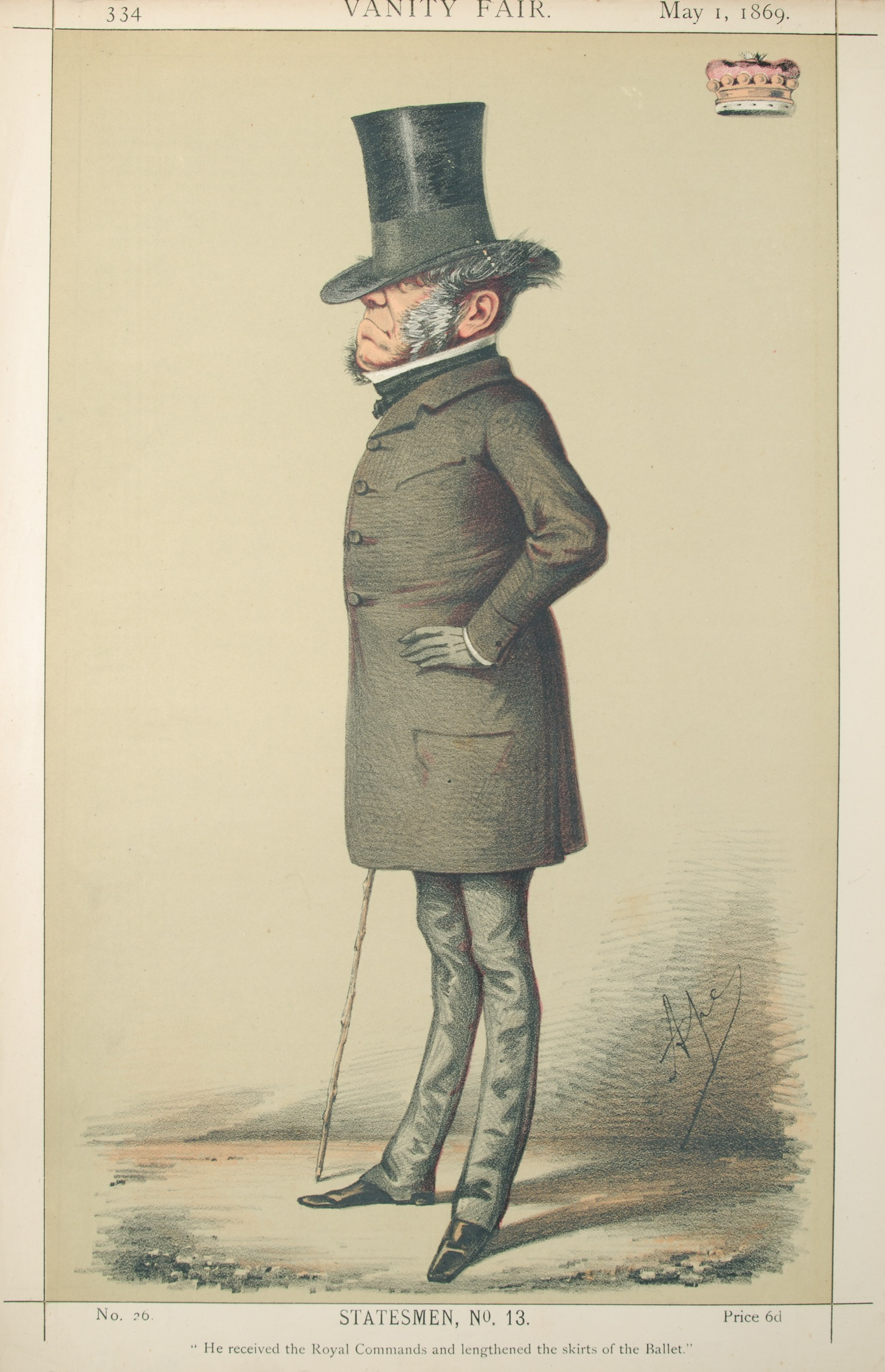
Caricature, published in Vanity Fair in 1869.

Earl Sydney, of Scadbury in the County of Kent, was a title in the Peerage of the United Kingdom. It was created in 1874 for John Townshend, 3rd Viscount Sydney.

== Earl Sydney (1874) ==
The titles of Baron Sydney (third creation; 1783) and Viscount Sydney (second creation; 1789), were created in the Peerage of Great Britain, for the politician Thomas Townshend (1733–1800), known as Lord Sydney.

Townshend was then succeeded by his son, John Thomas Townshend, 2nd Viscount Sydney (1764–1831).

On his death, the titles passed to his son, the Liberal politician John Robert Townshend, 3rd Viscount Sydney (1805–1890), who was then elevated to the title of earl in 1874. Earl Sydney notably served as Lord Chamberlain of the Household and as Lord Steward of the Household. On his death in 1890, however, in the absence of an heir, all his titles became extinct.

== Titleholders ==
- John Townshend, 1st Earl Sydney (1874–1890)

== See also ==
- Earl of Leicester (1618 creation)
- Marquess Townshend
- Frognal House
