= Mary Elizabeth Marsham, Countess of Romney =

- Countess of Romney
- Predecessor: Sophia Marsham
- Full name: Mary Elizabeth Townshend
- Other titles: Hon. Mary Elizabeth Townshend
- Born: Mary Elizabeth Townshend; 6 March 1794
- Died: 25 December 1847 (aged 47)
- Noble family: Townshend, Marsham
- Spouses: George James Cholmondeley (m. 1825), Charles Marsham, 2nd Earl of Romney (m. 1832)
- Issue: Frances Sophia Cholmondeley; Hon. Robert Marsham-Townshend
- Father: John Thomas Townshend, 2nd Viscount Sydney
- Mother: Lady Caroline Elizabeth Letitia Clements

Mary Elizabeth Marsham, Countess of Romney (6 March 1794 – 25 December 1847), formerly the Hon. Mary Elizabeth Townshend, was the second wife of Charles Marsham, 2nd Earl of Romney. She was the daughter of John Thomas Townshend, 2nd Viscount Sydney, and his wife, the former Lady Caroline Elizabeth Letitia Clements.

Her first husband, whom she married on 4 October 1825, was George James Cholmondeley. Cholmondeley died in 1830.

They had one child:

- Frances Sophia Cholmondeley (died 1887), who married Reverend John Charles Riddell, a grandson of Charles Marsham, 1st Earl of Romney.

On 8 February 1832, she married the Earl of Romney, whose first wife, Sophia, had died in 1812. By the earl, she had one son:

- Hon. Robert Marsham-Townshend (1834–1914), who inherited the manor of Chislehurst from his mother's brother, John Townshend, 1st Earl Sydney.

The earl died in 1845, and was succeeded by Charles Marsham, 3rd Earl of Romney, the only son from his first marriage.
