= Baron Compton =

Arms of Compton: Sable, a lion passant guardant or between three esquire's helmets argent

Baron Compton is an abeyant title in the Peerage of England, meaning that inheritance of the title stopped because there was no legal priority as to which daughter would inherit the title. The title was created in 1572 for the Tudor politician, Sir Henry Compton. In 1618, his son was created Earl of Northampton. The titles remained united until the fifth earl died without any male heirs in 1754 and the title passed to his only daughter, Charlotte, who had already inherited the title of Baroness Ferrers of Chartley from her mother in 1740. Charlotte was the wife of Hon. George Townshend, who became Viscount Townshend in 1764 and was created Marquess Townshend after her death in 1770. The title then remained with the marquessate until her grandson, the third marquess, died childless in 1855 and both baronies became abeyant between his sisters and their descendants.

== Barons Compton (1572) ==
- Henry Compton, 1st Baron Compton (1544–1589)
- William Compton, 1st Earl of Northampton, 2nd Baron Compton (d. 1630)
- Spencer Compton, 2nd Earl of Northampton, 3rd Baron Compton (1601–1643)
- James Compton, 3rd Earl of Northampton, 4th Baron Compton (1622–1681)
- George Compton, 4th Earl of Northampton, 5th Baron Compton (1664–1727)
- James Compton, 5th Earl of Northampton, 6th Baron Compton (1687–1754)
- Charlotte Townshend, 16th Baroness Ferrers of Chartley, 7th Baroness Compton (d. 1770)
- George Townshend, 2nd Marquess Townshend, 8th Baron Compton (1753–1811)
- George Townshend, 3rd Marquess Townshend, 9th Baron Compton (1778–1855)

== Family tree ==
Huntingdon (7th creation), Northampton, and Wilmington family tree

Robert; 1000–1035; Duke of Normandy
Adelaide of Normandy c. 1030–before 1090; Countess of Aumale | William the Conqueror c. 1028–1087; King of England
Earl of Huntingdon (1st creation), 1065; Earl of Northampton (1st creation), 1071
Waltheof d. 1076; Earl of Northumbria, 1st Earl of Huntingdon and Earl of Northampton | Judith of Lens; 1054/1055–c. 1090, 2nd Earl of Huntingdon
Maud c. 1074–1130; 3rd Countess of Huntingdon, 2nd Countess of Northampton; Queen of Scotland | Simon I de Senlis d. 1111–1113; 3rd Earl of Huntingdon, 2nd Earl of Northampton jure uxoris
Simon II de Senlis c. 1098–1153; 4th Earl of Huntingdon, 3rd Earl of Northampton
Simon III de Senlis c. 1138–1184; 5th Earl of Huntingdon, 4th Earl of Northampton
Earldom of Northampton (1st creation) reverted to the Crown, 1184
Earl of Northampton (2nd creation), 1337
William de Bohun c. 1312 – 1373; Earl of Hereford, Earl of Essex, 1st Earl of Northampton | Edward III; 1312–1377; King of England
Humphrey de Bohun; 1342–1373; Earl of Hereford, Earl of Essex, 2nd Earl of Northampton | John of Gaunt; 1340–1399; Duke of Lancaster | Thomas of Woodstock; 1355–1397; Duke of Gloucester
Earldom of Northampton (2nd creation) abeyant, 1373
Earl of Northampton (2nd creation restored), 1384 | Earl of Northampton (3rd creation), 1399
Henry Bolingbroke c. 1367 – 1413; 3rd Earl of Northampton, later King Henry IV | Anne of Gloucester; 1383–1438; Countess of Northampton
Earldom of Northampton (2nd creation) merged in the crown, 1399 | Earldom of Northampton (3rd creation) extinct, 1438
Earl of Huntingdon (7th creation), 1529
George Hastings; 1488–1544; 1st Earl of Huntingdon
Baron Hastings of Loughborough, 1558
Francis Hastings; 1514–1561; 2nd Earl of Huntingdon | Edward Hastings c. 1521–1572; Baron Hastings of Loughborough
Barony Hastings of Loughborough extinct, 1572
Earl of Northampton, (4th creation), 1604 | Baron Compton, 1572
Henry Howard; 1540–1614; Earl of Northampton | Henry Compton; 1544–1589; 1st Baron Compton | Frances Anne Hastings; 1533–1574 | Henry Hastings; 1536–1595; 3rd Earl of Huntingdon | George Hastings; 1540–1604; 4th Earl of Huntingdon | Edward Hastings; 1541–1603
Earldom of Northampton (4th creation) extinct, 1614
Earl of Northampton (5th creation), 1618
William Compton d. 1630; 1st Earl of Northampton, 2nd Baron Compton | Francis Hastings; 1560–1595 | Henry c. 1555–1640
Henry Hastings; 1586–1643; 5th Earl of Huntingdon
Spencer Compton; 1601–1643; 2nd Earl of Northampton, 3rd Baron Compton | Ferdinando Hastings; 1609–1656; 6th Earl of Huntingdon | Henry b. 1605
James Compton; 1622–1681; 3rd Earl of Northampton, 4th Baron Compton | Theophilus Hastings; 1650–1701; 7th Earl of Huntingdon | Richard; 1645–1714
Baron Wilmington, 1728; Earl of Wilmington and Viscount Pevensey, 1730
George Compton; 1664–1727; 4th Earl of Northampton, 5th Baron Compton | Spencer Compton c. 1674 – 1743; Earl of Wilmington, Viscount Pevensey, Baron Wilmington | George Hastings; 1677–1705; 8th Earl of Huntingdon | Henry; 1701–1786
Earldom of Wilmington, Vicountcy Pevensey, and Barony Wilmington extinct, 1743
James Compton; 1687–1754; 5th Earl of Northampton, 6th Baron Compton | George Compton; 1692–1758; 6th Earl of Northampton | Charles Compton | Theophilus Hastings c. 1696–1746; 9th Earl of Huntingdon
Charlotte Townshend d. 1770; Viscountess Townshend, Baroness Ferrers of Chartley, 7th Baroness Compton | Charles Compton; 1737–1763; 7th Earl of Northampton | Francis Hastings; 1729–1789; 10th Earl of Huntingdon | Theophilus Hastings; 1728–1804; 11th Earl of Huntingdon de jure | George; 1735–1802
Earldom of Huntingdon dormant/abeyant, 1804
George Townshend; 1753–1811; Marquess Townshend, Earl of Leicester, Viscount Townshend, Baron Townshend, Baron Ferrers of Chartley, 8th Baron Compton | Spencer Compton; 1760–1828; 8th Earl of Northampton
Marquess of Northampton (2nd creation), Earl Compton and Baron Wilmington, 1812 | Earldom of Huntingdon claim restored, 1819
George Townshend (1778–1885); Marquess Townshend, Earl of Leicester, Viscount Townshend, Baron Townshend, Baron Ferrers of Chartley, 9th Baron Compton | Charles Compton; 1760–1828; 1st Marquess of Northampton, Earl Compton, and Baron Wilmington, 9th Earl of Northampton | Hans "Francis" Hastings; 1779–1828; 12th Earl of Huntingdon
Barony Compton abeyant, 1855
Spencer Joshua Alwyne Compton; 1790–1851; 2nd Marquess of Northampton, Earl Compton, and Baron Wilmington, 10th Earl of Northampton
Charles Douglas-Compton; 1816–1877; 3rd Marquess of Northampton, Earl Compton, and Baron Wilmington, 11th Earl of Northampton | William Compton; 1818–1897; 4th Marquess of Northampton, Earl Compton, and Baron Wilmington, 12th Earl of Northampton | Francis Theophilus Henry Hastings; 1808–1875; 13th Earl of Huntingdon | George; 1814–1876
Francis Power Plantagenet Hastings; 1841–1885; 14th Earl of Huntingdon
William George Spencer Scott Compton; 1851–1913; 5th Marquess of Northampton, Earl Compton, and Baron Wilmington, 13th Earl of Northampton | Warner Francis John Plantagenet Hastings; 1868–1939; 15th Earl of Huntingdon | Aubrey; 1878–1929 | Hans; 1865–1933
William Bingham Compton; 1885–1978; 6th Marquess of Northampton, Earl Compton, and Baron Wilmington, 14th Earl of Northampton | Francis John Clarence Westenra Plantagenet Hastings; 1901–1990; 16th Earl of Huntingdon | Peter Hastings-Bass; 1920–1964 | George; 1905–1981
Spencer Douglas David Compton b. 1946; 7th Marquess of Northampton, Earl Compton, and Baron Wilmington, 15th Earl of Northampton | William Edward Robin Hood Hastings-Bass b. 1948; 17th Earl of Huntingdon | John Hastings-Bass b. 1954 | George; 1938–2005
Heir presumptive to the Earldom of Huntingdon
Daniel Bingham Compton b. 1973 styled Earl Compton | Adam b. 1977
Heir apparent to the Marquessate of Northampton | Second Heir presumptive to the Earldom of Huntingdon
