= Lord John Townshend =

British politician

The Right Honourable Lord John Townshend
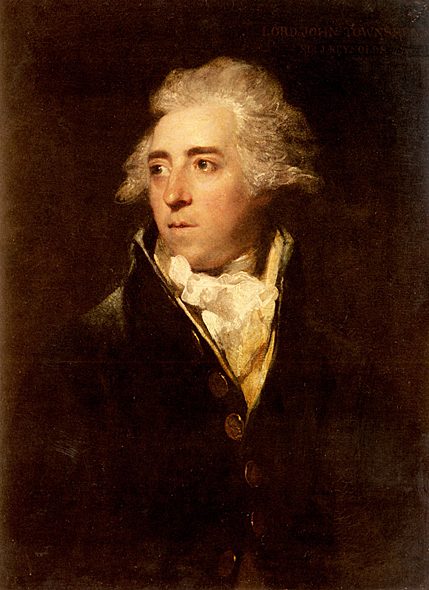
- Portrait of Lord John Townshend by Sir Joshua Reynolds

Joint Paymaster of the Forces
- In office 1806–1807
- Monarch: George III
- Prime Minister: The Lord Grenville
- Preceded by: George Rose and Lord Charles Somerset
- Succeeded by: Charles Long and Lord Charles Somerset

Personal details
- Born: 19 January 1757
- Died: 25 February 1833 (aged 76)
- Party: Whig
- Spouse: Georgiana Poyntz (d. 1851)
- Children: 3, including Charles and John

Lord John Townshend PC (19 January 1757 – 25 February 1833), styled The Honourable John Townshend until 1787, was a British Whig politician.

== Background ==
Townshend was the second son of Field Marshal George Townshend, 1st Marquess Townshend, by his first wife Charlotte Compton, 16th Baroness Ferrers of Chartley. George Townshend, 2nd Marquess Townshend, was his elder brother and Charles Townshend his uncle. He was educated at Eton and St John's College, Cambridge.

== Political career ==
Townshend was elected to the House of Commons for Cambridge University in 1780, a seat he held until 1784, and later represented Westminster from 1788 to 1790 and Knaresborough from 1793 to 1818. He was admitted to the Privy Council in 1806 and served under Lord Grenville as Paymaster of the Forces (alongside Lord Temple) between 1806 and 1807.

== Family ==
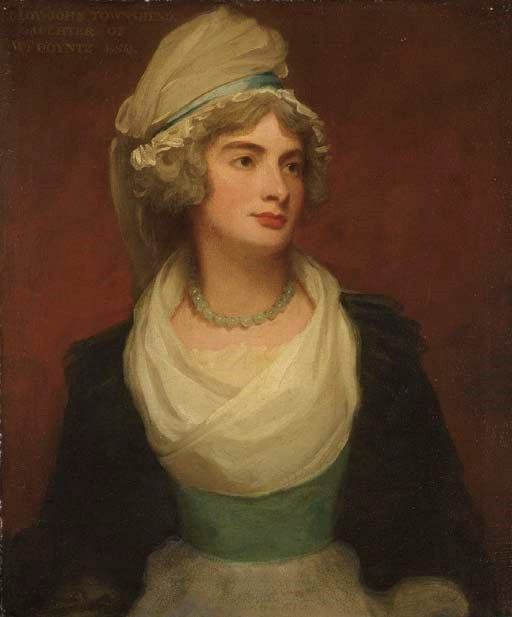
Georgiana Anne, Lady Townsend, painting by George Romney, 1792–1794.

Townshend married in 1787 Georgiana Anne Fawkener, daughter of William Poyntz, and the divorced wife of William Fawkener. When his grandmother Etheldreda Townshend died in 1788, she left him much of her fortune, including Balls Park. Their elder son Charles Fox Townshend was the founder of the Eton Society but died young. Their younger son John became an admiral in the Royal Navy and succeeded his first cousin as 4th Marquess Townshend in 1855. Their daughter Elizabeth Frances Townshend (2 August 1789 –10 April 1862 Nice) married 20 October 1813 Captain Augustus Clifford R.N., later Sir Augustus Clifford, 1st Bt (1788–1877), illegitimate son of the 5th Duke of Devonshire and his mistress, Lady Elizabeth Foster, née Hervey, later the Duke's second wife (1811). Mrs Clifford became Lady Clifford in 1838 when her husband was raised to a baronetcy. Townshend died in February 1833, aged 76. Lady Georgiana Anne died in 1851.

== See also ==
- Marquess Townshend

== Notes ==
Parliament of Great Britain
Preceded by Richard Croftes; James Mansfield	Member of Parliament for Cambridge University; 1780–1784; With: James Mansfield	Succeeded by William Pitt the Younger; Earl of Euston
Preceded by Samuel Hood; Charles James Fox	Member of Parliament for Westminster; 1788–1790; With: Charles James Fox	Succeeded by Charles James Fox; Samuel Hood
Preceded by Viscount Duncannon; James Hare	Member of Parliament for Knaresborough; 1793–1800; With: James Hare	Succeeded by Parliament of the United Kingdom
Parliament of the United Kingdom
Preceded by Parliament of Great Britain	Member of Parliament for Knaresborough; 1801–1818; With: James Hare 1801–1804; William Cavendish 1804–1805; Viscount Duncannon 1805–1806; Viscount Ossulston 1806–1818	Succeeded by George Tierney; Sir James Mackintosh
Political offices
Preceded by George Rose; Lord Charles Somerset	Paymaster of the Forces; 1806–1807; With: Earl Temple	Succeeded by Charles Long; Lord Charles Somerset
