= Sir Robert Marsham, 4th Baronet =

English politician

Sir Robert Marsham, 4th Baronet (16 December 1650 – 25 July 1703) was an English politician who sat in the House of Commons from 1698 to 1702.

Marsham was the son of Sir John Marsham, 1st Baronet and lived at Bushey Hall, Hertfordshire. He matriculated at St John's College, Oxford in 1666, and entered the Middle Temple in 1669.

He was one of the six Clerks of Chancery. He succeeded his nephew John (who died a minor) to the baronetcy in 1696, inheriting from him the Mote in Maidstone, Kent, where he thereafter lived.

Marsham was elected Member of Parliament for Maidstone in 1698 and held the seat until 1702.

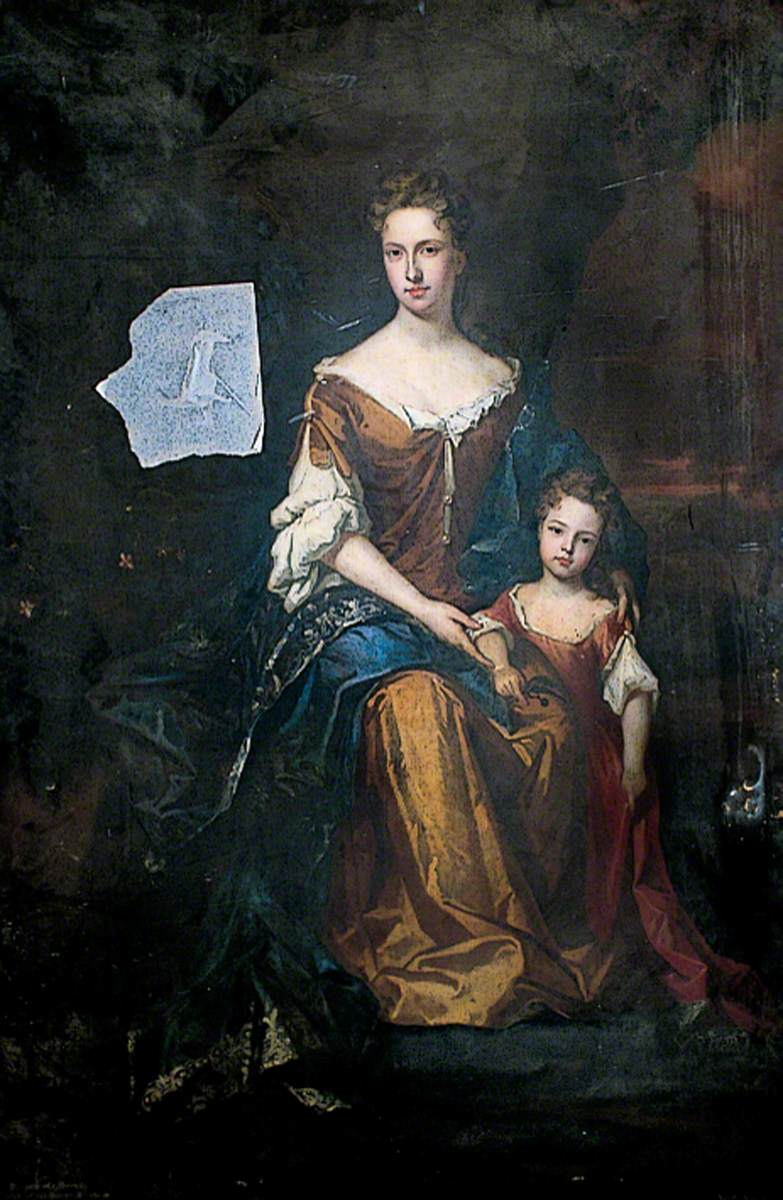
Margaret Bosville (d. 1710)

Marsham died in July 1703, aged 52. He had married Margaret Bosvile daughter of Thomas Bosvile of Little Motte, Eynsford, Kent. They had three sons and four daughters. Five of their children were nominated in the first British tontine in 1693. Their son, Robert, who succeeded to the baronetcy, was elevated to the peerage as Baron Romney in 1716 and was the ancestor of Earl of Romney.

Parliament of England
Preceded by Sir John Banks, Bt; Thomas Rider	Member of Parliament for Maidstone; 1698–1702; With: Thomas Bliss 1698–1702; Sir Thomas Roberts, Bt 1702	Vacant Writ suspended Title next held by Thomas Bliss; Heneage Finch
Baronetage of England
Preceded by John Marsham	Baronet (of Cuckston); 1696–1703	Succeeded by Robert Marsham
