= George Townshend, 3rd Marquess Townshend =

British peer

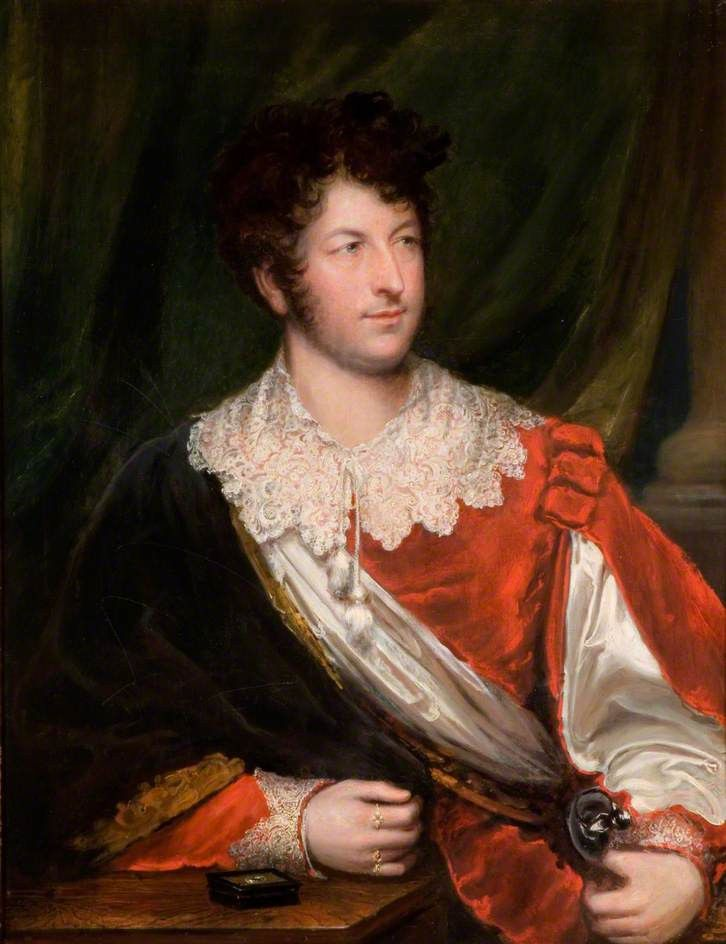
George Townshend, 3rd Marquess Townshend

George Ferrars Townshend, 3rd Marquess Townshend (13 December 1778 – 31 December 1855), previously known by the courtesy titles of Lord Chartley (from 1782 to 1807) and Earl of Leicester (from 1807 to 1811), was a British peer. His homosexuality caused a scandal and resulted in the rapid breakdown of his marriage and disinheritance by his father. He moved abroad and died at Genoa, then in the Kingdom of Sardinia, without issue.

== Origins and childhood ==
Townshend was born on 13 December 1778, the elder son and heir of George Townshend, 17th Baron Ferrers of Chartley and 8th Baron Compton (1753-1811), by his wife Charlotte Ellerker. His father was the eldest son and heir of George Townshend, 4th Viscount Townshend, and had inherited two baronies by writ from his mother, who had died in 1770. Townshend was educated at Eton College and Trinity College, Cambridge.

== Titles ==
His father was created Earl of Leicester in 1784, at which point Townshend adopted the courtesy title Lord Chartley (derived from his father's junior title of Lord Ferrers of Chartley). His grandfather was created Marquess Townshend in 1787, and when his father inherited that title in 1807 Townshend adopted as a courtesy title his father's more senior title of Earl of Leicester. He succeeded his father as 3rd Marquess Townshend in 1811.

== Marriage and scandal ==
In 1807, aged 31 and still then known as the Earl of Leicester, he married Sarah Dunn-Gardner (d.1858), the only surviving daughter and heiress of William Dunn-Gardner (d.1831) of Chatteris House, Isle of Ely, Cambridgeshire. His wife left him a year later, not having produced any issue, and having accused him of being impotent and of having had homosexual relations with his Italian secretary. Sarah sued for annulment in the ecclesiastical courts (which was never granted) and very shortly afterwards in 1809 eloped to Gretna Green with another man, namely John Margetts, a brewer from St. Ives, to whom she was thus married bigamously, which union was invalid in law. Following this scandal, Leicester was disinherited by his father for bringing disgrace to the family (although he could not affect the descent of the peerages), and he moved abroad. Sarah bore several children to John Margetts, who used the surname of their natural father ("Margetts") until 1823 when Sarah had the children baptised with the surname of her legal husband ("Townshend"). The legal position was that since Sarah's marriage had never been annulled, any children she bore would be deemed the progeny of Townshend and thus eligible to succeed him in his estates and titles. With this in mind, the eldest son John Margetts, Jnr (1811-1903) became "John Townshend" and assumed the courtesy title of "Earl of Leicester". He was later a Member of Parliament and a major landowner in Cambridgeshire, as heir of his mother, and finally after being de-legitimised adopted the name "John Dunn-Gardner".

=== Legal children de-legitimized ===
Townshend Peerage Act 1843
- Act of Parliament
- Parliament of the United Kingdom
- Long title: An Act to declare that certain Persons therein mentioned are not Children of the Most Honourable George Ferrars Marquis Townshend.
- Citation: 6 & 7 Vict. c. 35 Pr.

Dates
- Royal assent: 12 July 1843

Townshend Peerage Act 1847
- Act of Parliament
- Parliament of the United Kingdom
- Long title: An Act to extend the Relief given by an Act of the sixth and seventh years of the reign of Her present Majesty, intituled, "An Act to declare that certain Persons therein mentioned are not Children of the Most honourable George Ferrars Marquess Townshend."
- Citation: 10 & 11 Vict. c. 37 Pr.

Dates
- Royal assent: 25 June 1847

Alarmed at the pretensions of Sarah and her children, Townshend's younger brother Lord Charles Townshend (1785–1853) (who would inherit if Townshend had no legitimate sons) petitioned Parliament in May 1842 to have Sarah's children de-legitimized. Townshend supported the petition, and all the children were duly declared illegitimate by a private act of Parliament, the Townshend Peerage Act 1843 (6 & 7 Vict. c. 35 Pr.) whereupon the eldest son "John Townshend" (then himself a Member of Parliament for Bodmin) assumed his mother's maiden-name of "Dunn-Gardner".

== Death and succession ==
Townshend died in Genoa in December 1855, aged 77, without issue. His only brother Lord Charles Townshend, the petitioner in the legitimacy case, had predeceased him and left no sons. Therefore, the Earldom of Leicester became extinct, while the Baronies of Ferrers of Chartley and Compton fell into abeyance between his nephew (his middle sister's son) and his youngest sister, and remain in abeyance today. He was succeeded in the Marquessate of Townshend by his first cousin Rear Admiral John Townshend.

== Arms ==
Coat of arms of George Townshend, 3rd Marquess Townshend
Crest A stag statant proper, attired and unguled or. Escutcheon Quarterly, 1st and 4th, Azure, a chevron ermine between three escallops argent (Townshend); 2nd and 3rd, quarterly gules and or, in the first quarter a mullet argent, in the centre a crescent sable (Vere). Supporters Dexter, A stag sable, attired and unguled or; Sinister, A greyhound argent. Motto Hæc generi incrementa fides (Faith obtained these honours for our race’). Other versions The arms are also shown without the Vere quarters.

== Notes ==
Peerage of Great Britain
Preceded by George Townshend	Marquess Townshend; 1811 – 1855	Succeeded by John Townshend
Preceded by George Townshend	Earl of Leicester; 6th creation 1811 – 1855	Extinct
Peerage of England
Preceded by George Townshend	Baron Ferrers of Chartley; Baron Compton; 1811 – 1855	In abeyance
