= John Townshend, 1st Earl Sydney =

British politician and nobleman

The Right Honourable The Earl Sydney GCB PC
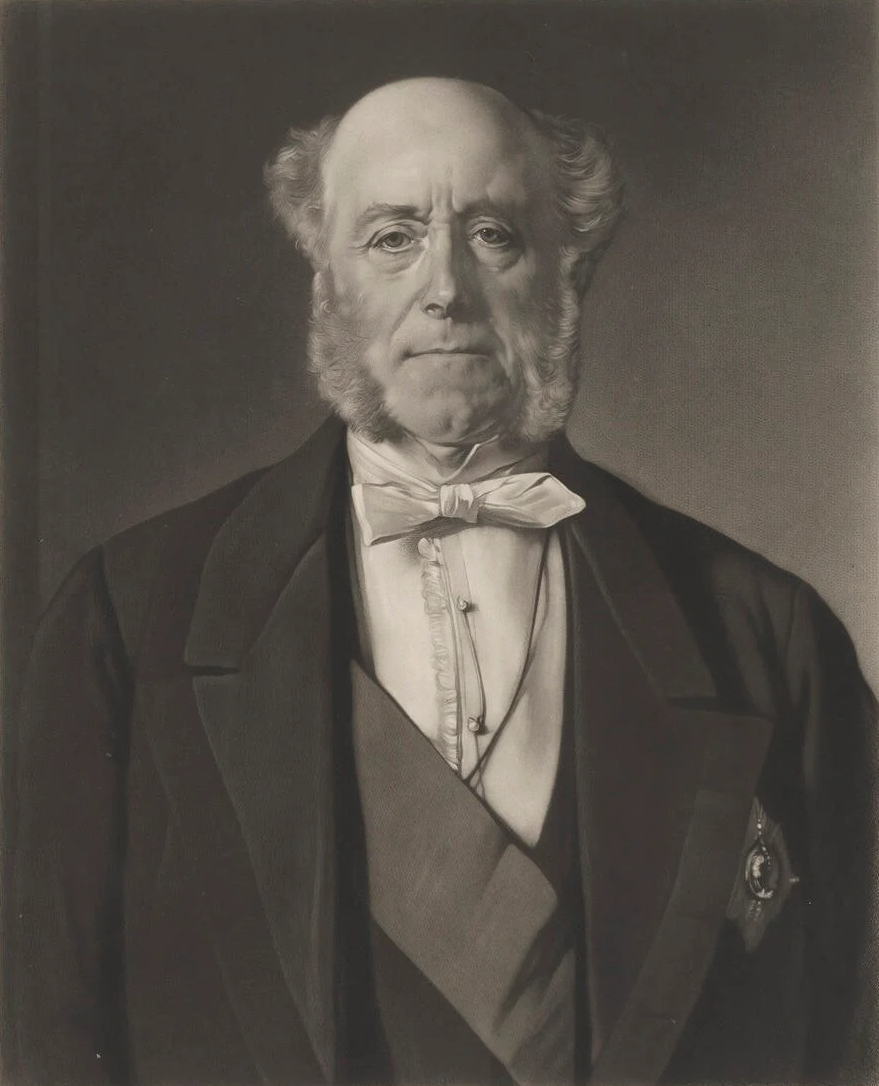
- Lord Sydney, 1881

Captain of the Yeomen of the Guard
- In office 30 December 1852 – 21 February 1858
- Monarch: Victoria
- Prime Minister: The Earl of Aberdeen; The Viscount Palmerston
- Preceded by: The Lord de Ros
- Succeeded by: The Lord de Ros

Lord Chamberlain of the Household
- In office 23 June 1859 – 26 June 1866
- Monarch: Victoria
- Prime Minister: The Viscount Palmerston; The Earl Russell
- Preceded by: The Earl De La Warr
- Succeeded by: The Earl of Bradford
- In office 9 December 1868 – 17 February 1874
- Monarch: Victoria
- Prime Minister: William Ewart Gladstone
- Preceded by: The Earl of Bradford
- Succeeded by: The Marquess of Hertford

Lord Steward of the Household
- In office 3 May 1880 – 9 June 1885
- Monarch: Victoria
- Prime Minister: William Ewart Gladstone
- Preceded by: The Earl Beauchamp
- Succeeded by: The Earl of Mount Edgcumbe
- In office 10 February 1886 – 20 July 1886
- Monarch: Victoria
- Prime Minister: William Ewart Gladstone
- Preceded by: The Earl of Mount Edgcumbe
- Succeeded by: The Earl of Mount Edgcumbe

Personal details
- Born: 9 August 1805
- Died: 14 February 1890 (aged 84)
- Party: Liberal
- Spouse: Lady Emily Paget (m. 1832)

John Robert Townshend, 1st Earl Sydney GCB PC (9 August 1805 – 14 February 1890), known as The Viscount Sydney between 1831 and 1874, was a British Liberal politician. In a ministerial career spanning over 30 years, he was twice Lord Chamberlain of the Household and twice Lord Steward of the Household.

== Background ==
A member of the Townshend family headed by the Marquess Townshend, Sydney was the son of John Townshend, 2nd Viscount Sydney, by his second wife Lady Caroline Elizabeth Letitia, daughter of Robert Clements, 1st Earl of Leitrim. He was educated at Eton and St John's College, Cambridge, graduating MA in 1824.

== Political career ==
Sydney was first elected to parliament for Whitchurch in 1826, a seat he held until 1831, when he succeeded his father in the viscountcy and entered the House of Lords. From 1828 to 1831 served Kings George IV and William IV as Groom of the Bedchamber and from 1835 to 1837 was a Gentleman of the Bedchamber to William IV.

In December 1852 he was appointed Captain of the Yeomen of the Guard, Deputy Chief Whip in the House of Lords in Lord Aberdeen's coalition government and was sworn of the Privy Council in early 1853. He continued as Captain of the Yeomen of the Guard when Lord Palmerston became prime minister in 1855, but relinquished the position when the Liberals lost power in February 1858. The Liberals returned to office under Palmerston already in June 1859, when Sydney was made Lord Chamberlain of the Household, a post he held until 1866, the last year under the premiership of Lord Russell. In February 1866 he was appointed a Knight Grand Cross of the Order of the Bath.

Sydney was once again Lord Chamberlain of the Household between 1868 and 1874 in William Ewart Gladstone's first administration. In 1874 he was created Earl Sydney, of Scadbury in the County of Kent. He later served under Gladstone as Lord Steward of the Household between 1880 and 1885 and between February and July 1886. However, despite Lord Sydney's ministerial career lasting over 30 years he was never a member of the cabinet.

Apart from his political career he was also Colonel of the Kent Militia Artillery from when it was raised in May 1853 until 1890, Lord Lieutenant of Kent between 1856 and 1890 and Captain of Deal Castle between 1879 and 1890.

== Family ==
Lord Sydney married Lady Emily Paget, daughter of Field Marshal Henry Paget, 1st Marquess of Anglesey, on 4 August 1832. They had no children. He died in February 1890, aged 84, when all his titles became extinct. The Countess Sydney survived her husband by three years and died in March 1893. The family seat of Frognal House was inherited by Lord Sydney's nephew Robert Marsham, who assumed the additional surname of Townshend in accordance with his uncle's will.

== Other notes ==
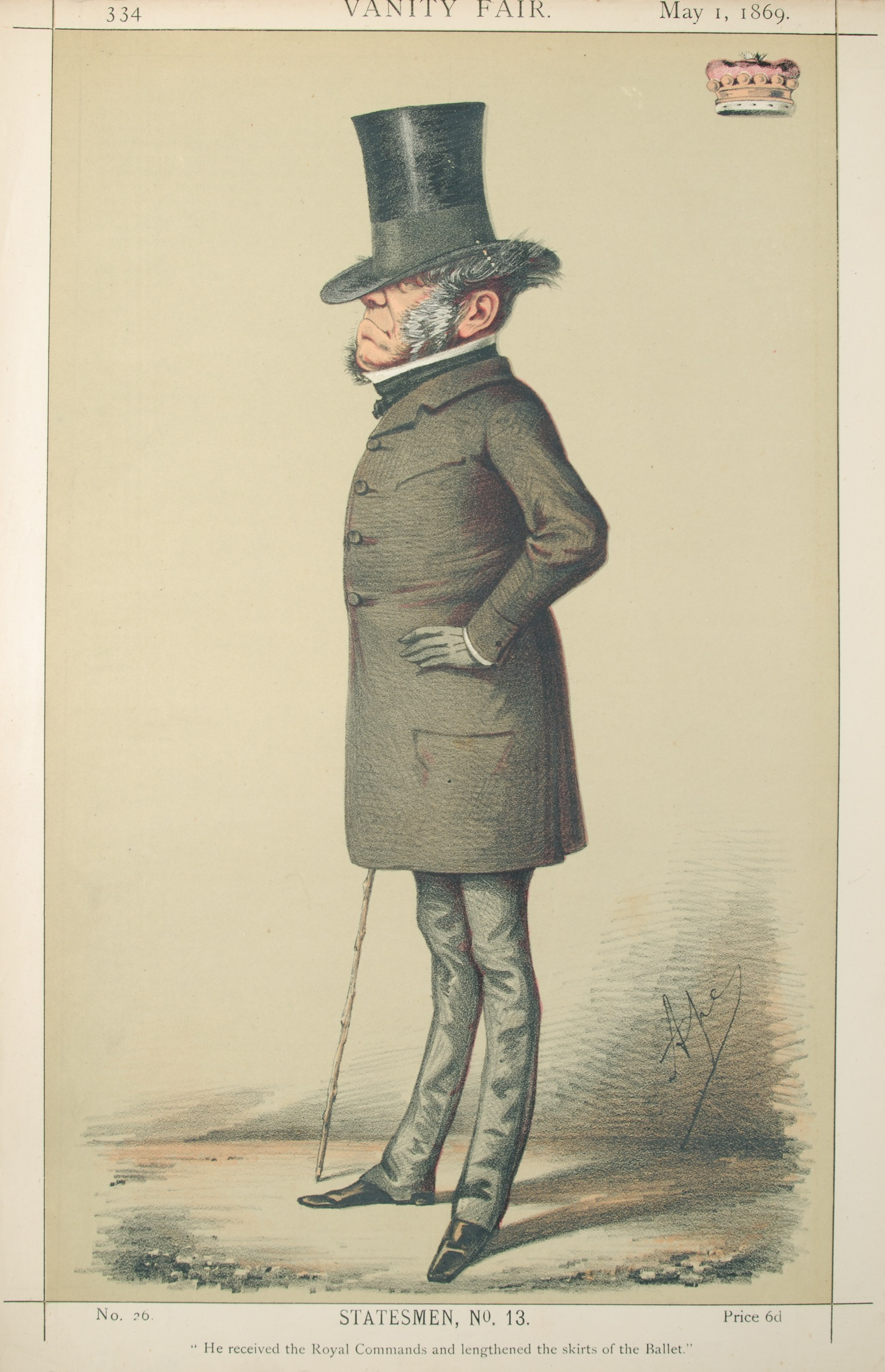
Caricature by Ape published in Vanity Fair in 1869.

The Sydney Arms on Old Perry Street, Chislehurst, was previously known as The Swan, and in Pigot's Directory of 1832 known as the White Swan. It was renamed in the 1880s in honour of John Robert Townshend, 3rd Viscount Sydney. The pub sign is a diagram of the Sydney family arms.

Parliament of the United Kingdom
Preceded by Horatio George Powys Townshend; Samuel Scott	Member of Parliament for Whitchurch; 1826–1831; With: Sir Samuel Scott, Bt	Succeeded by Sir Samuel Scott, Bt; Horatio George Powys Townshend
Political offices
Preceded by The Lord de Ros	Captain of the Yeomen of the Guard; 1852–1858	Succeeded by The Lord de Ros
Preceded by The Earl De La Warr	Lord Chamberlain; 1859–1866	Succeeded by The Earl of Bradford
Preceded by The Earl of Bradford	Lord Chamberlain; 1868–1874	Succeeded by The Marquess of Hertford
Preceded by The Earl Beauchamp	Lord Steward; 1880–1885	Succeeded by The Earl of Mount Edgcumbe
Preceded by The Earl of Mount Edgcumbe	Lord Steward; 1886	Succeeded by The Earl of Mount Edgcumbe
Honorary titles
Preceded by The Earl Cowper	Lord Lieutenant of Kent; 1856–1890	Succeeded by The Earl Stanhope
Peerage of Great Britain
Preceded by John Townshend	Viscount Sydney; 1831–1890	Extinct
Peerage of the United Kingdom
New creation	Earl Sydney; 1874–1890	Extinct
