= Sir Robert Shirley, 4th Baronet =

Royalist conspirator

Sir Robert Shirley, 4th Baronet (1629–1656), royalist conspirator, was the second son of Sir Henry Shirley, 2nd Baronet. Despite the Catholicism of his family, he was raised within the Church of England by his mother. He was admitted to Corpus Christi College, Cambridge, on 12 August 1645. The following year, on the death of his elder brother, Charles, he inherited the baronetcy and also married, against the wishes of his family, Katharine (d. 1672), daughter of Humphrey Okeover, of Okeover, Staffordshire.

Following the death of his uncle the Earl of Essex Shirley inherited half the Devereux property in England and Ireland. An ardent royalist, he confronted soldiers at the parliamentary garrison at Ashby-de-la-Zouch in 1648. In 1650 he was imprisoned in the Tower of London and his lands were sequestrated. His youth and his association with Essex led to his release and the restoration of his lands. He continued his political activity, becoming a focus of royalist opposition in the Midlands, while Staunton Harold became a refuge for displaced Laudian clerics. In 1653 he began the rebuilding of Staunton Harold church as a symbol of his political and religious beliefs. He was again arrested and sent to the Tower. While there he became the royalists' financial agent and drew up proposals for royalist reorganization on the basis of complete identification of the royal cause with the Church of England. He died in the Tower, probably of smallpox, in November 1656 and was buried at Breedon on the Hill, Leicestershire the following month, the funeral sermon being preached by Gilbert Sheldon.

Baronetage of England
Preceded by Charles Shirley	Baronet (of Staunton Harold); 1646–1656	Succeeded by Seymour Shirley
