= Robert Shirley (FRS) =

British politician and aesthete

Robert Shirley FRS (4 September 1673 – 25 February 1699 N.S.), styled Hon. Robert Shirley after 1677, was an English politician and aesthete. An unsuccessful Parliamentary candidate for Staffordshire in 1698, he was admitted to the Royal Society the next year and died shortly thereafter.

Shirley was born at Staunton Harold Hall, the eldest son of Sir Robert Shirley, 7th Baronet, later Baron Ferrers of Chartley. Initially betrothed to his first cousin Catherine Venables, who died young in 1680, he married Anne Ferrers on 27 September 1688. Her grandfather John Ferrers was the heir male of Ferrers of Groby, and Anne inherited from him Tamworth Castle and the rest of his estates. After his marriage, he mostly lived at Chartley Castle and at Staunton Harold. Shirley visited the family estate in Ireland (a moiety of the Barony of Farney, in County Monaghan) in the summer of 1698.

On his return from Ireland, he proposed himself as a candidate for Staffordshire in the 1698 election in place of the retiring John Grey. He solicited the support of Sir Walter Bagot, 3rd Baronet, who had sat for the county until 1695, and his son Edward, but this forward proposal (the Staffordshire gentry had historically met and chosen candidates by consensus, to avoid the cost of a contested election) backfired. Edward had his own designs on the seat, and he wrote to many of the local gentry to inform them of Shirley's breach of protocol, asking them not to pledge their support until a meeting could be held. As the other sitting member, Henry Paget, intended to retain his seat, local support began to coalesce around Paget and Bagot. Nonetheless, Robert's father, Lord Ferrers, and his kinsman Viscount Weymouth continued actively soliciting support for Shirley and Bagot; the support of Whigs such as Philip Foley for Paget in 1693 had made him somewhat suspect among the Tories. Lord Ferrers, though a Tory, obtained the interest of the Whig Dukes of Shrewsbury and Newcastle on Robert's behalf, suggesting a fluid political affiliation. In August 1698, on the eve of the election, John Chetwynd held a meeting between the Shirleys and the Bagots at Ingestre to try to broker a last-minute compromise, in which one of the candidates would withdraw in exchange for an unopposed candidature at the next election. The compromise failed, and the contest may have gone to a poll; if so, Shirley was unsuccessful, and Paget and Bagot were elected.

Shirley was interested in literature and science, and was admitted a Fellow of the Royal Society on 11 January 1699. However, he did not long enjoy his membership, dying of smallpox on 25 February following. His wife Anne had died of the same illness in March 1698; both were buried at Staunton Harold. He left four children:

- Robert Shirley, Viscount Tamworth (1692–1714)
- Elizabeth Shirley, 15th Baroness Ferrers of Chartley (1694–1741)
- Ferrers Shirley (5 July 1696 – 10 October 1712)
- Thomas Shirley (3 July 1697 – 1708)
