= Sir George Shirley, 1st Baronet =

Landowner

Sir George Shirley, 1st Baronet (1559–1622), was an English landowner, created a baronet in 1611. He was the son of John (1535–1570), eldest son of Francis Shirley (1515–1571) of Staunton Harold, and Jane, only daughter and heir of Thomas Lovett of Astwell, Northants. The family inclined to Roman Catholicism, and one of his sisters, Elizabeth Shirley, became a nun, but generally they maintained sufficient conformity to avoid the penalties for recusancy.

Inheriting the estate as a minor, George's wardship was granted by the queen to the courtier Mary Cheke, who sold it on to Sir John Throckmorton. George matriculated at Hart Hall, Oxford, in 1573. In 1584 he was questioned concerning his links to Sir John's son Francis in relation to the Throckmorton Plot.

The following year he made preparations to serve with the Earl of Leicester in the Netherlands, although he does not appear in the lists of Leicester's retinue. Sir John presumably intended to marry George to one of his own daughters, but instead accepted £1,500 to allow him to choose his own bride. He married Frances (1561–1595), the daughter of Henry Berkeley, 7th Baron Berkeley, and his first wife Katherine, the daughter of the Earl of Surrey. With her he had 5 children, including his heir Henry and the Catholic antiquary Sir Thomas Shirley. He subsequently married Dorothy, the widow of the diplomat Sir Henry Unton.

In 1603, as High Sheriff of Northamptonshire, he accompanied James I of England on his way through the county on his way to London.

Shirley died in 1622 and was buried at Breedon on the Hill, where he had erected a monument after the death of his first wife. At his death he owned property in Leicestershire, Northamptonshire, Huntingdonshire, Warwickshire, Derbyshire, and Staffordshire, and an income from which he was able to draw several legacies of £2000 each.

Political offices
Preceded by Robert Spencer	High Sheriff of Northamptonshire; 1602–1603	Succeeded by William Tate
Baronetage of England
New creation	Baronet of Staunton Harold; 1611–1622	Succeeded by Henry Shirley
