= Charlotte Townshend, Viscountess Townshend =

British Viscountess (1729-1770)

Charlotte Townshend, Viscountess Townshend (1729-1770), suo jure 16th Baroness Ferrers of Chartley and 7th Baroness Compton, known as Lady Charlotte Compton until 1749 and as Lady Ferrers of Chartley from 1749 to 1764, was a British peeress.

Charlotte was the only surviving child of James Compton, 5th Earl of Northampton, and his wife Elizabeth Shirley, suo jure 15th Baroness Ferrers of Chartley. The barony of Ferrers of Chartley had fallen into abeyance on her mother's death in 1741. In 1747, her eldest sister died and she was made Baroness Ferrers of Chartley, Bourchier, Louvaine and Bassett of Drayton, as well as Viscountess Tamworth. However, in 1749, the abeyance was terminated in Charlotte's favour, and she became the 16th Baroness. In 1754, she also succeeded her father in the barony of Compton.

In 1751, Charlotte married the Hon. George Townshend, later fourth Viscount Townshend and first Marquess Townshend, "a beautiful young Lady with an immense Fortune". When he succeeded in the viscountcy in 1764, she became known as Viscountess Townshend. Charlotte died in September 1770 and was succeeded in the two baronies by her eldest son George, who was created Earl of Leicester in 1784 and later succeeded as second Marquess Townshend. Her husband survived her by over 30 years and died in 1807.

== See also ==
- Marquess of Northampton
- Marquess Townshend

== Notes and references ==
Peerage of England
In abeyance Title last held by Elizabeth Compton	Baroness Ferrers of Chartley; 1749 – 1770	Succeeded by George Townshend
Preceded by James Compton	Baroness Compton; 1754 – 1770	Succeeded by George Townshend
