= Sir Henry Shirley, 2nd Baronet =

English landowner (1589–1633)

Sir Henry Shirley, 2nd Baronet (1589–1633), landowner and local politician, was born in January 1589 at Somerton, Oxfordshire, the eldest child of Sir George Shirley. According to the memoir of his younger brother Sir Thomas Shirley, he attended Oxford University, but no record of this has been found. He then travelled abroad before joining the court of Henry Frederick, Prince of Wales. In May 1615 he married Lady Dorothy Devereux, the daughter of Robert Devereux, 2nd Earl of Essex.

On his father's death Shirley entered local politics as a supporter of the Duke of Buckingham. In 1624 he was pricked as high sheriff of Leicestershire. The following year, he read the proclamation of the accession of Charles I of England in Leicester's market place. He was the most active local opponent of Leicestershire's lord lieutenant, the Earl of Huntingdon. In 1627 an absurd squabble with a gentleman of the earl's household led to his imprisonment and house arrest, ended by an embarrassing public apology. When he was subsequently accused of adultery, his wife 'both for safeguard of her honour, blemished by him scandalously, and for her alimony or maintenance (being glad to get from him) ... was forced to endure a suit in the High Commission Court'.

He subsequently boasted that he had been promised a barony as compensation, if he failed to secure a seat in the parliamentary elections, and the lieutenancy of Leicestershire. The privy council were initially lenient, but when it was widely reported that he had said he 'cared for never a Lord in England a fart, except the Lord of Hosts', he was summoned before the House of Lords and committed to the Fleet Prison. Four days later the house heard his apologies and ordered that they be published at the next assizes in Leicester.

Shirley died in February 1633 and was buried in the Shirley family chapel at Breedon on the Hill, Leicestershire. According to his brother, he died a Catholic. Two years later his widow married William Stafford (c.1604–1637) of Blatherwycke, Northamptonshire, in a Roman Catholic ceremony in the Queen's chapel at Somerset House.

Political offices
Preceded by Sir John Bale	High Sheriff of Leicestershire; 1624–1625	Succeeded by Sir Thomas Hartopp
Baronetage of England
Preceded by George Shirley	Baronet (of Staunton Harold); 1622–1633	Succeeded by Charles Shirley
