= Baron Ferrers of Chartley =

Title in the Peerage of England

The title Baron Ferrers of Chartley was created on 6 February 1299 for John de Ferrers, son of Robert de Ferrers, 6th Earl of Derby. The daughter of the 6th Baron Ferrers of Chartley, Anne, married Walter Devereux who was summoned to parliament as Lord Ferrers in her right. Their descendants became Earls of Essex and the peerage was forfeited in 1601 on the attainder of Robert Devereux, 2nd Earl of Essex, but restored to his son Robert in 1604, on whose death in 1646 the peerage fell into abeyance. The abeyance was terminated in 1677 when Robert Shirley, a grandson of one of the sisters of the 3rd Earl of Essex, was summoned as Lord Ferrers of Chartley with precedence to the original creation. In 1711, Shirley was created the 1st Earl Ferrers, but the Earldom and Barony separated at his death, the barony going to Elizabeth Shirley, the daughter of his eldest son, while the earldom went to his second son. On the 1741 death of Elizabeth Shirley, 15th Baroness Ferrers of Chartley and wife of the Earl of Northampton, the peerage again briefly fell into an abeyance that was resolved in 1749 by the death of two of the three heiresses, leaving the surviving daughter, Charlotte Compton, wife of the Marquess Townshend, as 16th Baroness Ferrers of Chartley. The barony continued, merged with the marquessate, until the death of George Ferrars Townshend, 3rd Marquess Townshend in 1855, when it again fell into abeyance between his two sisters and their heirs. It remains in abeyance.

== Origins of the Ferrers of Chartley family ==
Arms of Ferrers of Chartley: Vairy, or and gules

The Lords Ferrers of Chartley descended Henry de Ferrers, of Ferrières-Saint-Hilaire in Normandy, who participated in the Norman Conquest of England, and was richly rewarded by King William the Conqueror with the grant of 210 manors throughout England and Wales, situated mainly in Derbyshire and Leicestershire. His son Robert de Ferrers was named Earl of Derby, and this title continued in the family until Robert de Ferrers, 6th Earl of Derby was attainted in 1267 for his participation in the Second Barons' War against king Henry III. Draconian terms were set for the reacquisition of his lands, and he was only able to have the manor of Chartley, Staffordshire, restored to him, in 1275.

John de Ferrers, son and heir of the former 6th Earl, would continue his father's struggle for restoration of family lands until barred from pursuing it further by Edward I in 1301. He was summoned in 1298/9 to Parliament, thereby becoming the first Baron Ferrers of Chartley.

== Barons Ferrers of Chartley (1299) ==
- John de Ferrers, 1st Baron Ferrers of Chartley (1271–1312), son of Robert de Ferrers, 6th Earl of Derby, summoned by writ to parliament, thereby becoming Baron Ferrers of Chartley;
- John de Ferrers, 2nd Baron Ferrers of Chartley (died by 1324);
- Robert de Ferrers, 3rd Baron Ferrers of Chartley (1309–1350);
- John de Ferrers, 4th Baron Ferrers of Chartley (1329–1367);
- Robert de Ferrers, 5th Baron Ferrers of Chartley (1360–1413);
- Edmund de Ferrers, 6th Baron Ferrers of Chartley (1389–1435);
- William de Ferrers, 7th Baron Ferrers of Chartley (1412–1450);
- Anne de Ferrers, 8th Baroness Ferrers of Chartley (1438–1468), who as a female was able to succeed to a barony created by writ. Her husband Walter Devereux, Lord Ferrers of Chartley, was summoned to parliament as Lord Ferrers jure uxoris (in her right) and died 1485.
- John Devereux, 9th Baron Ferrers of Chartley (1463–1501), succeeded on his mother's death;
- Walter Devereux, 1st Viscount Hereford, 10th Baron Ferrers of Chartley (1491–1558);
- Walter Devereux, 1st Earl of Essex, 2nd Viscount Hereford, 11th Baron Ferrers of Chartley (1540–1576);
- Robert Devereux, 2nd Earl of Essex, 3rd Viscount Hereford, 12th Baron Ferrers of Chartley (1567–1601), on his death in 1601 the peerage was forfeited;
- Robert Devereux, 3rd Earl of Essex, 4th Viscount Hereford, 13th Baron Ferrers of Chartley (1591–1646), titles restored in 1604; on his death in 1646 the barony fell into abeyance.
- Robert Shirley, 1st Earl Ferrers, 14th Baron Ferrers of Chartley (1650–1717), abeyance of the barony terminated in 1677, in 1711 created 1st Earl Ferrers;
- Elizabeth Shirley, 15th Baroness Ferrers of Chartley (1694–1741), on her death in 1741 the barony again fell into abeyance.
- Charlotte Compton, 16th Baroness Ferrers of Chartley (c.1710–1770), abeyance terminated in 1749;
- George Townshend, 2nd Marquess Townshend, 17th Baron Ferrers of Chartley (1755–1811);
- George Ferrars Townshend, 3rd Marquess Townshend, 18th Baron Ferrers of Chartley (1788–1855), on his death the peerage again fell into abeyance, where it remains today.
