= William Brodrick =

William Brodrick may refer to:

- William Brodrick (1763–1819), British politician
- William John Brodrick, 7th Viscount Midleton (1798–1870), Irish peer and Anglican clergyman
- William Brodrick, 8th Viscount Midleton (1830–1907), Irish peer, landowner and politician
- St John Brodrick, 1st Earl of Midleton (1856–1942), British politician
- William Brodrick (writer) (born 1960), British novelist

== See also ==
- William Broderick (1877–1957), Irish politician and farmer
