= Viscount Midleton =

Title in the peerage of Ireland

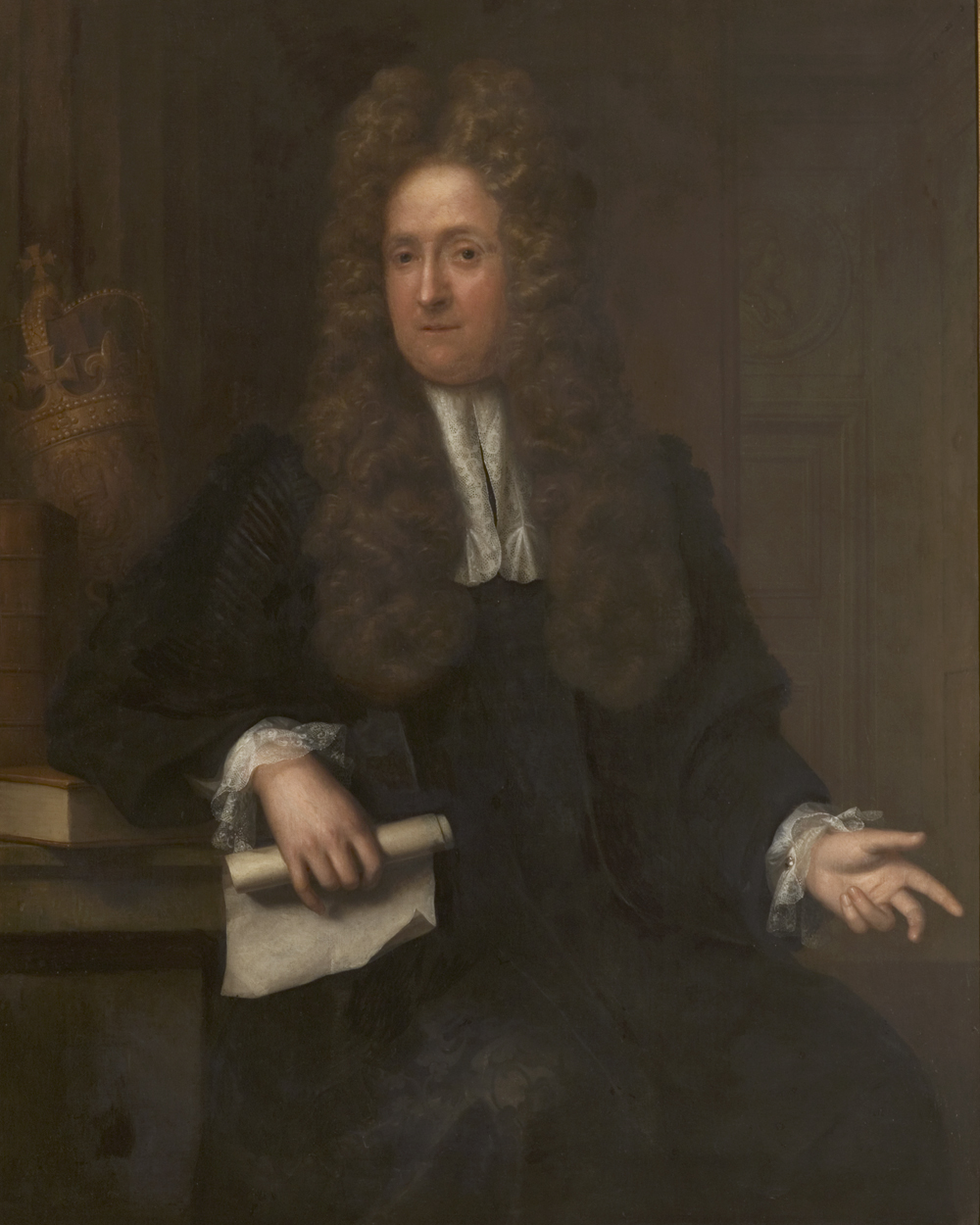
Alan Brodrick, 1st Viscount Midleton

Viscount Midleton, of Midleton in the County of Cork, is a title in the Peerage of Ireland. It was created in 1717 for Alan Brodrick, 1st Baron Brodrick, the Lord Chancellor of Ireland and former Speaker of the Irish House of Commons. He was created Baron Brodrick, of Midleton in the County of Cork, in 1715 in the same peerage. His grandson, the third Viscount, co-represented Ashburton then New Shoreham in the British House of Commons. His son, the fourth Viscount, sat similarly for Whitchurch for 22 years. In 1796 he was created Baron Brodrick, of Peper Harow in the County of Surrey, in the Peerage of Great Britain, with a special remainder to the heirs male of his father, the third Viscount. On the death of his son, the fifth Viscount, this line of the family failed.

He was succeeded by his first cousin, the sixth Viscount. He was the eldest son of Charles Brodrick, Archbishop of Cashel, fourth son of the third Viscount. His nephew, the eighth Viscount, briefly represented Mid Surrey in the House of Commons as a Conservative and served as Lord Lieutenant of Surrey between 1896 and 1905. His son, the ninth Viscount, was a prominent Conservative politician and government minister (1880-1906) and from 1910 was the nominal leader of the Irish Unionist Alliance (IUA) in Southern Ireland. Successful lobbying by him and associated Southern Unionists was instrumental in ensuring their representation in the Seanad of the Irish Free State however he failed to win some safeguards for fellow Southern Unionists in the 1921 Anglo-Irish Treaty. In 1920 he was created Earl of Midleton and Viscount Dunsford, of Dunsford in the County of Surrey, in the Peerage of the United Kingdom which titles became extinct on the death of his son, the second Earl, in 1979.

The Irish titles and barony of Brodrick passed on to his second cousin, the eleventh Viscount. He was the grandson of Reverend the Hon. Alan Brodrick, youngest son of the seventh Viscount. As of 2010 the titles are held by the eleventh Viscount's son, the twelfth Viscount, who succeeded in 1988.

The ancestral seat of the Brodrick family was Peper Harow, its final form commissioned by the third Viscount, near Godalming, Surrey. The house was sold in 1944 by the second Earl of Midleton. The family's original seat was Ballyannan Castle near Midleton in County Cork, which they occupied until c. 1728, but continued to own; it was becoming a ruin by 1837.

== Viscounts Midleton (1717) ==
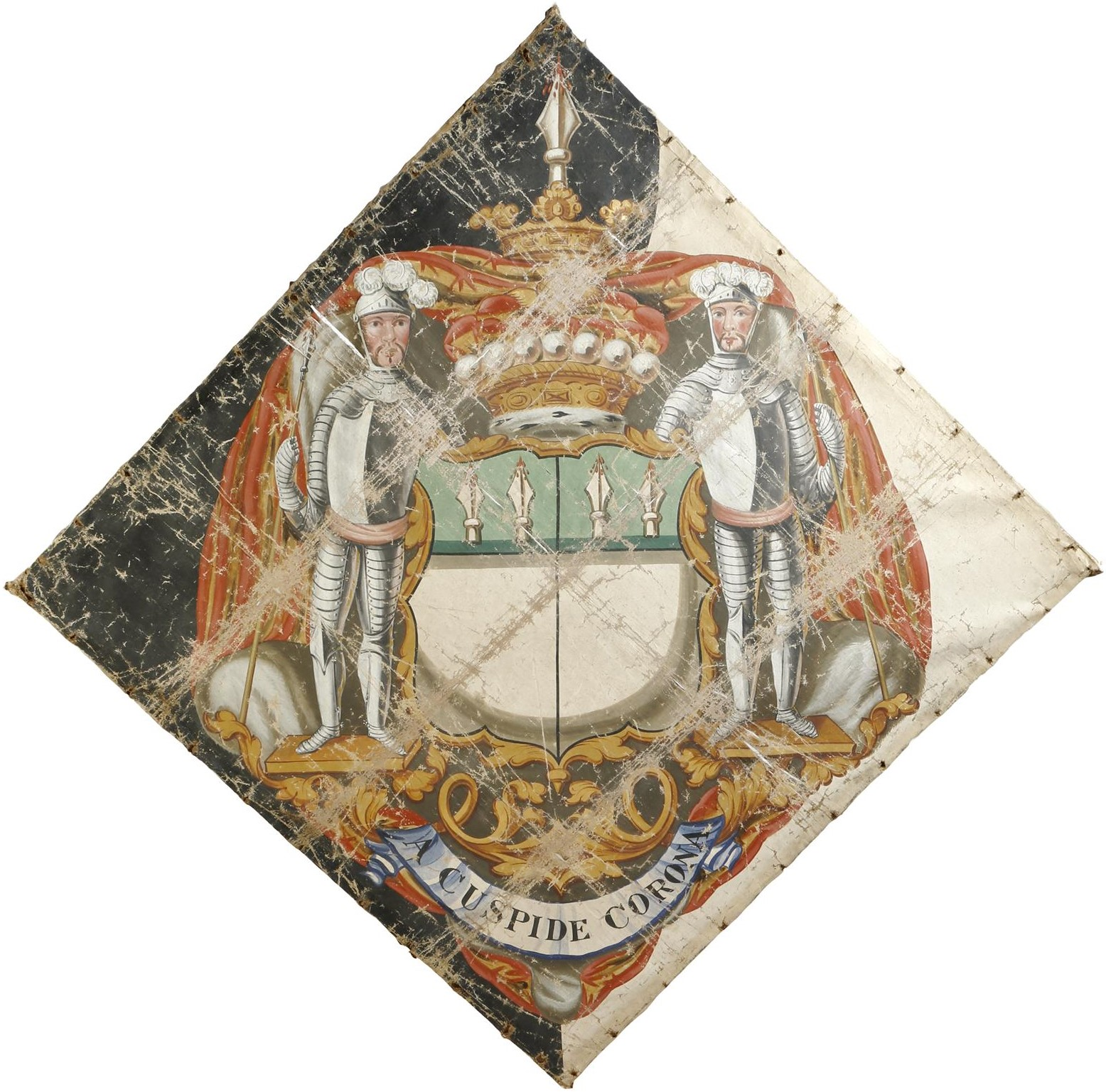
A funeral hatchment with the coat arms of William Brodrick, 7th Viscount Midleton, displaying his arms impaling the paternal arms of his second wife, Harriet Brodrick, daughter of George Brodrick, 4th Viscount Midleton. Anglo-Irish School, 1870.

- Alan Brodrick, 1st Viscount Midleton (1656–1728)
  - Hon. St John Brodrick (1685–1728)
- Alan Brodrick, 2nd Viscount Midleton (1702–1747)
- George Brodrick, 3rd Viscount Midleton (1730–1765)
- George Brodrick, 4th Viscount Midleton (1754–1836)
- George Alan Brodrick, 5th Viscount Midleton (1806–1848)
- Charles Brodrick, 6th Viscount Midleton (1791–1863)
- William John Brodrick, 7th Viscount Midleton (1798–1870)
- William Brodrick, 8th Viscount Midleton (1830–1907)
- William St John Fremantle Brodrick, 9th Viscount Midleton (1856–1942) (created Earl of Midleton in 1920)

== Earls of Midleton (1920) ==
- William St John Fremantle Brodrick, 1st Earl of Midleton (1856–1942)
- George St John Brodrick, 2nd Earl of Midleton (1888–1979)

== Viscounts Midleton (1717; reverted) ==
- Trevor Lowther Brodrick, 11th Viscount Midleton (1903–1988)
- Alan Henry Brodrick, 12th Viscount Midleton (born 1949)

The heir apparent is the present holder's son the Hon. Ashley Rupert Brodrick (born 1980).
