= George Brodrick =

George Brodrick may refer to:

- George Brodrick, 3rd Viscount Midleton (1730–1765), British nobleman
- George Brodrick, 4th Viscount Midleton (1754–1836), British politician
- George Brodrick, 5th Viscount Midleton (1806–1848), British nobleman
- George Brodrick, 2nd Earl of Midleton (1888–1979), English aristocrat
- George Charles Brodrick (1831–1903), British historian
