= 1870 Mid Surrey by-election =

UK Parliamentary by-election

The 1870 Mid Surrey by-election was fought on 17 October 1870. The by-election was fought due to the succession to a peerage of the incumbent Conservative MP William Brodrick. It was won by the unopposed Conservative candidate Richard Baggallay.
