= William Brodrick, 8th Viscount Midleton =

Irish peer, landowner and Conservative politician

The Right Honourable The Viscount Midleton
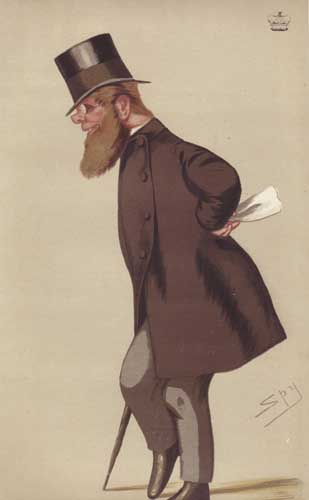
- Viscount Midleton in Vanity Fair

Lord Lieutenant of Surrey
- In office 1896–1905
- Preceded by: Hon. Francis Egerton
- Succeeded by: Hon. Henry Cubitt

Member of Parliament for Surrey Mid
- In office 1868–1870 Serving with Henry Peek
- Preceded by: New constituency
- Succeeded by: Henry Peek; Sir Richard Baggallay

Personal details
- Born: William Brodrick; 6 January 1830
- Died: 18 April 1907 (aged 77); Peper Harow House
- Spouse: Hon. Augusta Mary Fremantle (m. 1853; died 1903)
- Parent(s): William John Brodrick, 7th Viscount Midleton; Harriett Brodrick
- Education: Eton College
- Alma mater: Balliol College, Oxford

William Brodrick, 8th Viscount Midleton (6 January 1830 – 18 April 1907), was an Irish peer, landowner and Conservative politician in both Houses of Parliament, entering first the Commons for two years.

== Early life ==
Midleton was born on 6 January 1830. He was the eldest son of first cousins, Harriett Brodrick and Reverend William John Brodrick, 7th Viscount Midleton, the Dean of Exeter and Chaplain to Queen Victoria. His younger brother, the Hon. George Charles Brodrick, was for many years warden of Merton College, Oxford.

His paternal grandparents were the former Mary Woodward (a daughter of Bishop Richard Woodward) and The Right Reverend the Hon. Charles Brodrick, Archbishop of Cashel (who was the third son of the 3rd Viscount Midleton). His paternal uncle, Charles, was the 6th Viscount Midleton and his aunt, Mary, was the wife of the 2nd Earl of Bandon. His maternal grandparents were George Brodrick, 4th Viscount Midleton and the former Frances Pelham (a daughter of the 1st Earl of Chichester) and his maternal uncle, George, was the 5th Viscount Midleton.

He was educated at Eton College and Balliol College, Oxford.

== Career ==
Midleton contested the East Surrey parliamentary seat in 1865 but was unsuccessful. Midleton was returned to Parliament as one of two representatives for Surrey Mid in 1868. He served on two commissions, the Noxious Vapours Commission (1875) and the Sale of Exchange of Livings (1877) although his blindness limited his ability to do more in public life. Midleton's son later wrote of him:

My father, whose courage and self-denial were conspicuous, suffered from serious defects of sight and hearing, partly due to an accident, but mainly to his father and mother having been first cousins, from which source a disability affected several of my grandfather's family in different ways. The calamity of partial blindness came upon my father early in his married life, and deprived him of a rising practice at the Bar. Although he fought his way with splendid energy into Parliament, his infirmities robbed him of the full scope which his ability and untiring work would have commanded.

Hansard records 161 contributions, with a notable hiatus for the years 1898 to 1901.

=== Later life ===
He vacated his seat in the commons in 1905 when he succeeded his father in the viscountcy. For some time he was president of the National Protestant Church Union, and Midleton served as High Steward of Kingston-upon-Thames from 1875 to 1893 and Lord Lieutenant of Surrey between 1896 and 1905.

He made considerable improvements to Peper Harow House.

== Personal life ==
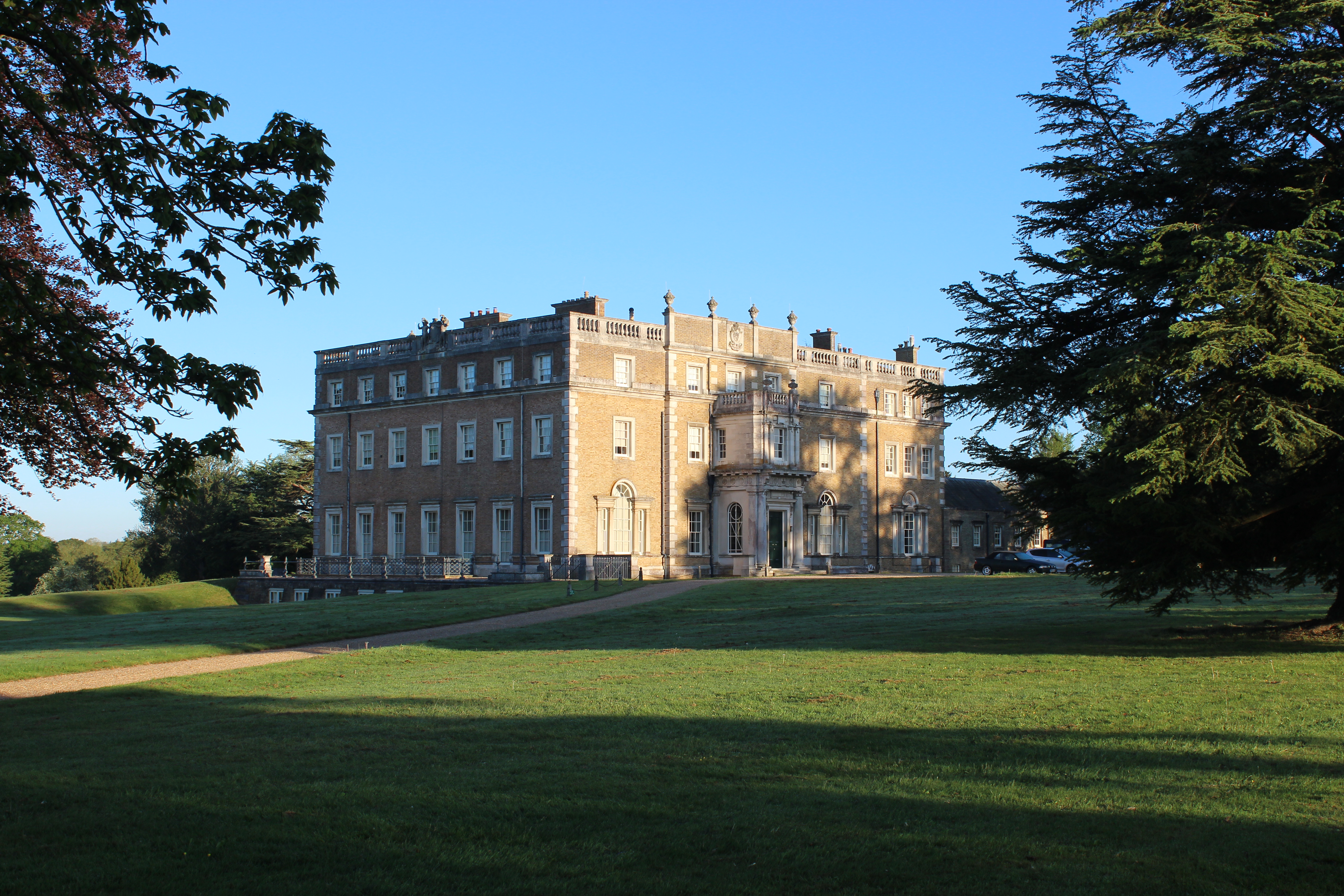
Peper Harow House

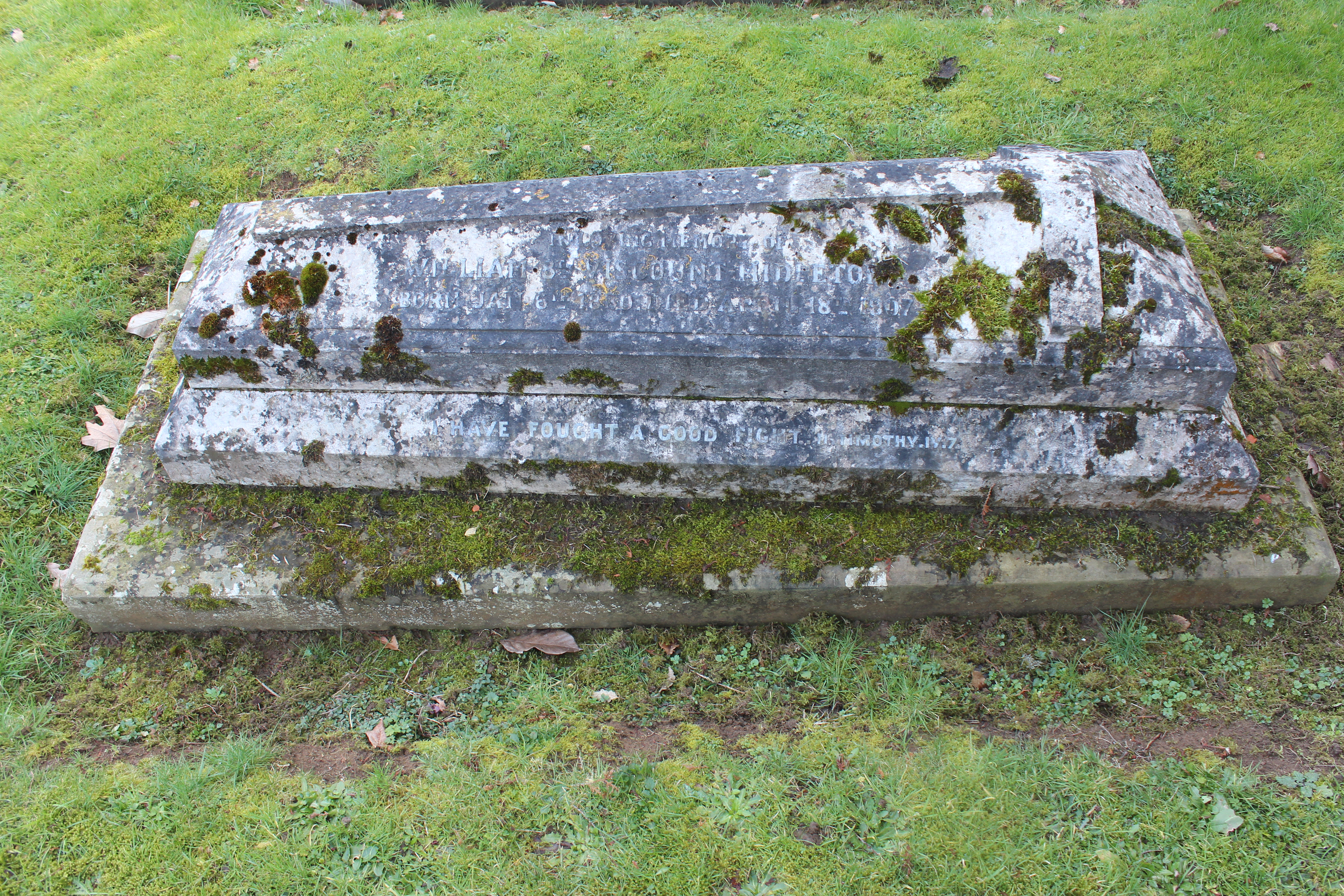
Grave in Peper Harow, Surrey

On 25 October 1853 Lord Midleton married the Hon. Augusta Mary Fremantle. She was the third daughter of Thomas Fremantle, 1st Baron Cottesloe and the former Louisa Elizabeth Nugent (the eldest daughter of Field Marshal Sir George Nugent, 1st Baronet and Maria Skinner, a descendant of the Schuyler and Van Cortlandt family of British North America). They had three sons and five daughters:

- Hon. Augusta Louisa Brodrick (d. 1934), who married Sir Cuthbert Peek, 2nd Baronet in 1884.
- Evelyn Harriet Brodrick (1855–1856), who died in infancy.
- William St John Fremantle Brodrick, 1st Earl of Midleton (1856–1942), who married Lady Hilda Charteris, a daughter of the 10th Earl of Wemyss. After her death in 1901, he married Madeleine Stanley, a daughter of the 1st Baron St Helier.
- Hon. Helen Anna Brodrick (d. 1937), who married the Rt. Rev. Archibald Ean Campbell, Bishop of Glasgow and Galloway, in 1885.
- Hon. Edith Mary Brodrick (d. 1944), who was a published author of books such as The Cloud of Witness and her autobiography Under Three Reigns. She married Philip Lyttelton Gell of Hopton Hall, in 1889.
- Hon. Albinia Lucy Brodrick, (c. 1862–1955), who assumed the name Gobnait Ní Bhruadair. She was an Irish republican and radical activist.
- Hon. Laurence Alan Brodrick (1864–1915), who married Anne Gwendolyn Lloyd Wynne in 1896. Anne, a widow of Maj. Gen. Edward William Lloyd Wynne, was a daughter of Hugh Robert Hughes.
- Lt.-Col. Hon. Arthur Grenville Brodrick (1868–1934), who married Lesley Venetia Clough-Taylor, only child of Lt.-Col. Edward Harrison Clough-Taylor of Firby Hall, in 1912. Her mother, Lady Elizabeth Campbell, was a daughter of George Campbell, 8th Duke of Argyll and Lady Elizabeth Sutherland-Leveson-Gower (eldest daughter of George Sutherland-Leveson-Gower, 2nd Duke of Sutherland).
- Hon. Marian Cecilia Brodrick (1869–1932), who married Sir James Beethom Whitehead, a diplomat, and was the mother of seven children including Sir Edgar Whitehead.

Lady Midleton died on 1 June 1903 aged 75 at Peper Harow. Lord Midleton survived her by four years and died on 18 April 1907, aged 77 at Peper Harow. He was succeeded by his eldest son, St John, who was a prominent Conservative politician and was created Earl of Midleton in 1920. His probate was resworn in 1907 at a rounded (as to shillings and pence) £78,967 (equivalent to about £10,600,000 in 2023).

Parliament of the United Kingdom
New constituency	Member of Parliament for Surrey Mid; 1868–1870; With: Henry Peek	Succeeded by Henry Peek; Sir Richard Baggallay
Honorary titles
Preceded by Hon. Francis Egerton	Lord Lieutenant of Surrey; 1896–1905	Succeeded by Hon. Henry Cubitt
Peerage of Ireland
Preceded by William John Brodrick	Viscount Midleton; 1870–1907	Succeeded by St John Brodrick
