= Peek baronets =

Baronetcy in the Baronetage of the United Kingdom

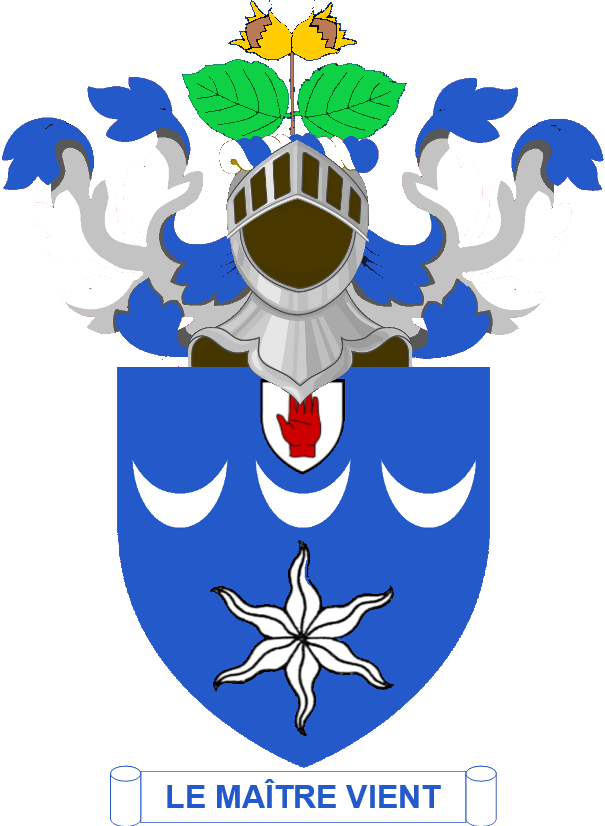
- Crest: Two hazel nuts, slipped proper.
- Shield: Azure an estoile Argent, in chief three crescents of the last.
- Motto: Le Maître Vient (The Master Comes)

The Peek Baronetcy, of Rousdon in the County of Devon, is a title in the Baronetage of the United Kingdom. It was created on 13 May 1874 for Henry Peek. He was an importer of spices, tea and other groceries, a philanthropist and Conservative Member of Parliament for Surrey Mid. The second Baronet was an astronomer and meteorologist; the third Baronet was high sheriff of Devon in 1912.

== Peek baronets, of Rousdon (1874) ==
- Sir Henry William Peek, 1st Baronet (1825–1898)
- Sir Cuthbert Edgar Peek, 2nd Baronet (1855–1901)
- Sir Wilfrid Peek, 3rd Baronet (1884–1927)
- Sir Francis Henry Grenville Peek, 4th Baronet (1915–1996)
- Sir William Grenville Peek, 5th Baronet (1919–2004)
- Sir Richard Grenville Peek, 6th Baronet (born 1955)

The heir apparent is the present holder's son Tim Peek (born 1989).
