= 1874 Mid Surrey by-election =

UK Parliamentary by-election

The 1874 Mid Surrey by-election was fought on 16 March 1874. The by-election was fought due to the incumbent Conservative MP, Richard Baggallay, becoming Solicitor General for England and Wales. It was retained by the incumbent.
