= Ronald William Graham =

British diplomat

The Right Honourable Sir Ronald William Graham GCB GCMG GCVO

British Ambassador to Italy
- In office 1921–1933
- Preceded by: George Buchanan
- Succeeded by: Sir Eric Drummond

Personal details
- Born: 24 July 1870 London, England
- Died: 26 January 1949 (aged 78) London, England
- Spouse: Lady Sybil Brodrick (m. 1912; died 1934)
- Parent: Henry John Lowndes Graham
- Education: Eton College
- Occupation: Diplomat

Sir Ronald William Graham, GCB, GCMG, GCVO, PC (24 July 1870 – 26 January 1949) was a British diplomat and the British Ambassador to Italy from 1921 to 1933.

== Early life ==
Graham was born in London 24 July 1870, the eldest son of Sir Henry John Lowndes Graham by his first wife Lady Edith Elizabeth Gathorne-Hardy (d. 1875), daughter of Lord Cranbrook. He was educated at Eton College.

== Diplomatic service ==
In 1892 Graham joined the British Diplomatic Service with his first foreign post at Paris. He was promoted to Third Secretary in 1894, In 1904, he was promoted to first secretary and worked at the Eastern Department of the Foreign Office, before moving to Cairo as a Counsellor. He was promoted to Councillor of Embassy in 1907, and to the rank of Minister Plenipotentiary in 1916.

After a period as Minister at the Hague from 1919 (and concurrently accredited to Luxembourg), he was sworn into Privy Council in 1921 and appointed Ambassador to Italy. He was the British representative during the Fascist Revolution of 1922 when Benito Mussolini came to power. Graham retired in November 1933 and became a trustee of the British Museum from 1937.

== Personal life ==
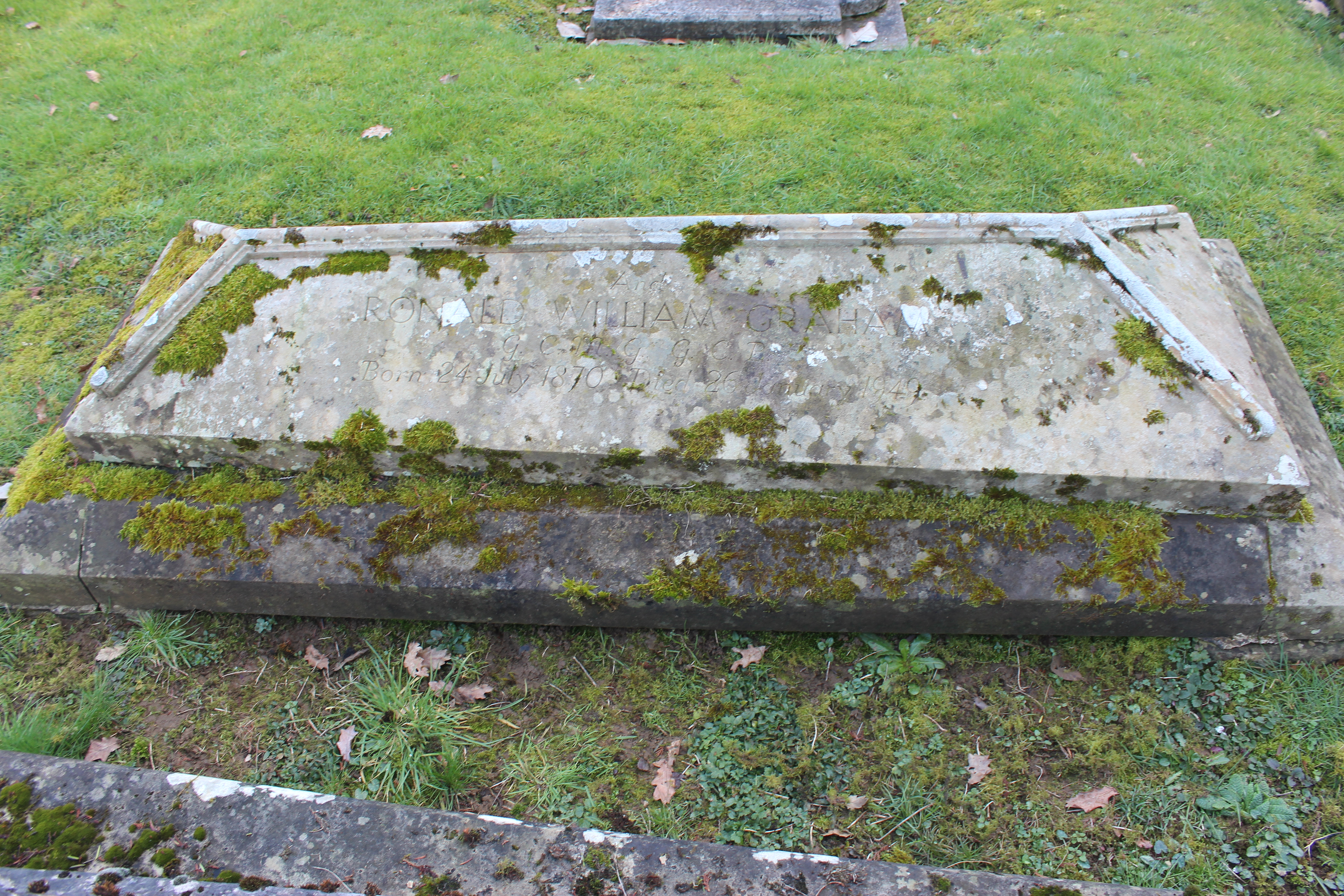
Grave in Peper Harow, Surrey

Graham married Lady Sybil Brodrick, the daughter of the Earl of Midleton in January 1912. Lady Sybil, who was Maid of honour to Queen Mary from 1911 to 1912, was the sister of George Brodrick, 2nd Earl of Midleton. She was given permission to wear the Grand Cordon of the Order of El Kemal in 1916.

His wife died six months after Graham retired and they had no children. Graham died at his home in London aged 78 in 1949.

== Honours ==
Graham was appointed a Companion of the Order of the Bath (CB) in the 1910 Birthday Honours. Graham was appointed a Knight Commander of the Order of St Michael and St George (KCMG) in 1915, while serving as an adviser to the Egyptian Ministry of the Interior. He was awarded the Grand Cordon of the Order of the Nile in the same year. He was appointed a Knight Grand Cross of the Royal Victorian Order (GCVO) in 1923, on the occasion of the King's visit to Rome, and promoted to Knight Grand Cross of the Order of St Michael and St George (GCMG) in the 1926 Birthday Honours.

He was promoted to Knight Grand Cross of the Order of the Bath (GCB) in the 1932 Birthday Honours.

Diplomatic posts
Preceded by Sir Walter Townley	Envoy Extraordinary and Minister Plenipotentiary of the United Kingdom to the Kingdom of the Netherlands; 1919–1921	Succeeded by Sir Charles Marling
Preceded by George Buchanan	British Ambassador to Italy; 1921–1933	Succeeded by Sir Eric Drummond
