= George Brodrick, 2nd Earl of Midleton =

English aristocrat, landowner and soldier

The Right Honourable The Earl of Midleton MC

Personal details
- Born: George St John Brodrick; 21 February 1888
- Died: 2 November 1979 (aged 91)
- Spouses: Margaret Rush (m. 1917; div. 1925) Guinevere Sinclair Gould (m. 1925; div. 1975) Rene Ray (m. 1975)
- Relations: William Brodrick, 8th Viscount Midleton (grandfather); Francis Richard Charteris, 10th Earl of Wemyss (grandfather)
- Parent(s): St John Brodrick, 1st Earl of Midleton; Lady Hilda Charteris
- Education: Eton College
- Alma mater: Balliol College, Oxford

George St John Brodrick, 2nd Earl of Midleton MC (21 February 1888 – 2 November 1979) was an English aristocrat, landowner and soldier.

== Early life ==
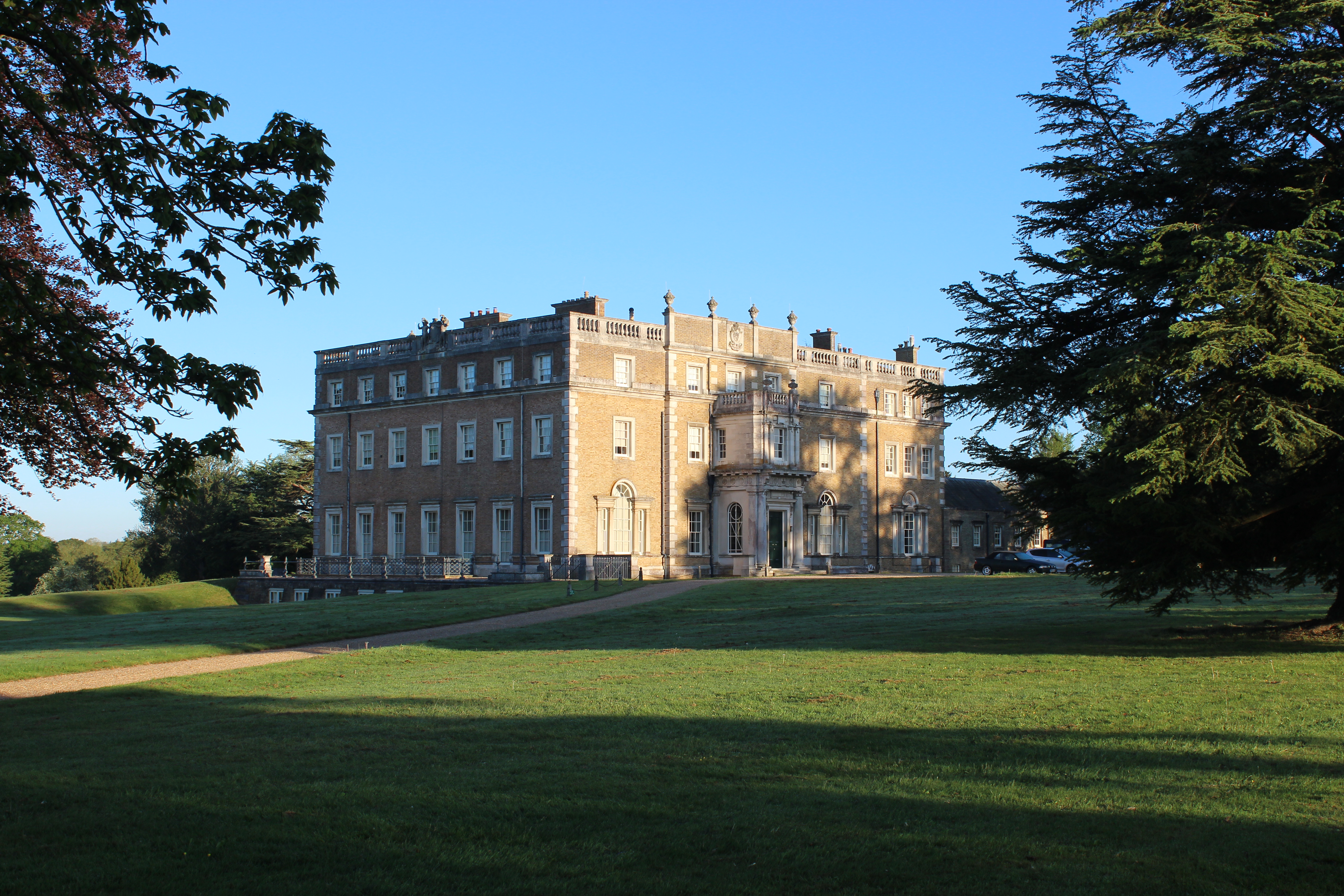
The former Brodrick family seat, Peper Harow House.

He was the eldest son of five children born to St John Brodrick, 1st Earl of Midleton by his first wife, Lady Hilda Charteris. His siblings included Lady Muriel Brodrick (wife of Dudley Marjoribanks, 3rd Baron Tweedmouth), Lady Sybil Brodrick who was Maid of honour to Queen Mary from 1911 to 1912 (wife of Sir Ronald William Graham), Lady Aileen Brodrick (wife of Charles Francis Meade), Lady Moyra Brodrick (wife of Gen. Sir Charles Loyd of Geldeston Hall) After his mother's death in 1901, his father remarried, in 1903, to Madeleine Stanley, a daughter of The Baron St Helier. From his father's second marriage, his younger-half siblings were Maj. Hon. Francis Alan Brodrick (who married Margaret Letitia Lyell, only daughter of Maj Hon Charles Henry Lyell) and Maj. Hon. Michael Victor Brodrick. Both of his brothers were killed in action in Italy in September 1943.

His paternal grandparents were William Brodrick, 8th Viscount Midleton and the former Hon. Augusta Mary Fremantle (a daughter of Thomas Fremantle, 1st Baron Cottesloe). His maternal grandparents were Francis Richard Charteris, 10th Earl of Wemyss and Lady Anne Anson (a daughter of Thomas Anson, 1st Earl of Lichfield).

He was educated at Eton and Balliol College, Oxford.

== Career ==
From 1914 to 1918, he served in World War as aide-de-camp on the personal staff of Sir Ian Hamilton in Egypt and Gallipoli. In 1918, he was Staff Officer and was awarded Military Cross. During World War II, he served as aide-de-camp to the Commander-in-Chief, Home Forces.

On 2 February 1920, his father was created Earl of Midleton and the Viscount Dunsford, of Dunsford in the County of Surrey. Thereafter, and until his father's death in 1942, he was referred to by the courtesy title of Viscount Dunsford.

He succeeded his father, who had served as Secretary of State for War and Secretary of State for India, as the Earl of Midleton in 1942. In 1944, he sold the family seat, Peper Harow House (which had been built by Sir William Chambers for George Brodrick, 3rd Viscount Midleton in 1765), and the entire village, to property developers. Both are now owned by a trust.

== Personal life ==
Lord Midleton was married three times to three actresses, but did not have any children from any of his marriages.

=== First marriage ===
His first marriage was to the stage actress Margaret "Peggy" Rush, (Note: Peggy was born in Chicago, Illinois, in around 1898. Her parents relocated to England, when she was just three months old. In 1915 she began her stage career as a member of a musical comedy chorus, that appeared at the Maxine Elliott's Theatre. A photograph of her by the Bassano studio (1923) can be found in Britain’s National Portrait Gallery. "Miss Rush had a sense of humor... She once said that she never knew whether to refer to herself as American or English. She quipped that she felt safest calling herself a Chicagoan".) a daughter of J. Rush, of Cromer, Norfolk, on 23 June 1917. They divorced in March 1925 before he succeeded to the Earldom.

=== Second marriage ===
On 28 July 1925, when he was known as Viscount Dunsford, he married Guinevere Jeanne (née Sinclair) Gould (1885–1978) at the American Presbyterian Church in Montreal. Guinevere, an actress at the Gaiety Theatre, was the widow of George Jay Gould, and a daughter of Alexander Sinclair of Dublin. (Note: Guinevere had been the mistress of George Jay Gould before the death of his first wife, fellow actress Edith Kingdon, in 1921. Sinclair married Gould on 1 May 1922 and had three children with him, George Sinclair Gould (1915–2003), Jane Sinclair Gould (1916–1948), and Guinevere Gould (1922–1968).) Her grandfather was Sir Edward Burrowes Sinclair, King's Professor of Midwifery in the School of Physic of the University of Dublin, and her cousin was Sir George McMunn, High Commissioner of Palestine. They were divorced in 1975.

=== Third marriage ===
In the 1950s he met film actress Irene Lilian Creese (1911–1993), better known by her stage name Rene Ray, who was born in London and made her London acting debut at the Savoy Theatre in 1930. Lord Midleton and Ray, whose first husband was composer George Posford, moved to Jersey together in 1963. Immediately after his 1975 divorce from his second wife, Guinevere, he married for the third, and final, time to Ray on 24 April 1975.

=== Death ===
Lord Midleton died on 2 November 1979. Upon his death, the Earldom of Midleton and the Viscountcy of Dunsford became extinct, but the Viscountcy of Midleton passed to his second cousin, Trevor Lowther Brodrick. The Countess of Midleton died in 1993.

Peerage of the United Kingdom
Preceded by William Brodrick	Earl of Midleton; 1942–1979	Extinct
Peerage of Ireland
Preceded by William Brodrick	Viscount Midleton; 1942–1979	Succeeded by Trevor Brodrick
