= Gobnait Ní Bhruadair =

Irish republican (1861 – 1955)

- Born: Hon. Albinia Lucy Brodrick; 17 December 1861; Belgrave, London, England
- Died: 16 January 1955 (aged 93); Sneem, County Kerry, Ireland

Gobnait Ní Bhruadair (born Albinia Lucy Brodrick; 17 December 1861 – 16 January 1955) was an Irish republican and lifelong radical. She campaigned passionately for causes as diverse as the reform of nursing, protection and promotion of the Irish language and the freedom of Ireland from British rule.

== Background ==
She was born the Hon. Albinia Lucy Brodrick on 17 December 1861 at 23 Chester Square, Belgrave, London, the fifth daughter of William Brodrick, 8th Viscount Midleton (1830–1907), and his wife, Augusta Mary (née Freemantle), daughter of the 1st Baron Cottesloe. She spent her early childhood in London until the family moved to their country estate in Peper Harow, Surrey in 1870. Educated privately, she travelled extensively across the continent and spoke fluent German, Italian and French, and had a reading knowledge of Latin.

Her family was an English Protestant aristocratic one which had been at the forefront of British rule in Ireland since the 17th century. In the early twentieth century it had included leaders of the Unionist campaign against Irish Home Rule. Her brother, St John Brodrick, 1st Earl of Midleton, had been nominal leader of the Irish Unionist Alliance from 1910 until 1918 when he and other Unionists outside Ulster established the Irish Unionist Anti-Partition League.

The polar opposite of Ní Bhruadair, he was, in the words of one biographer, 'consistent in his low opinion of the Irish [and] he held imperialist views that warmly embraced much of the jingoism associated with social Darwinism. The early Albinia Lucy Brodrick conformed to her familial political views on Ireland, if her authorship of the pro-Unionist song 'Irishmen stand' is an indicator. However, by the start of the twentieth century she had become a regular visitor to her father's estate in County Cork. There she began to educate herself about Ireland and began to reject the views about Ireland that she had been raised on. In 1902 she wrote about the need to develop Irish industry and around the same time she began to develop an interest in the Gaelic Revival. She began to pay regular visits to the Gaeltacht where she became fluent in Irish and horrified at the abject poverty of the people.

From this point on, her affinity with Ireland and Irish culture grew intensely. Upon her father's death in 1907 she became financially independent and in 1908 bought a home near West Cove, Caherdaniel, County Kerry. The same year she established an agricultural cooperative there to develop local industry. She organised classes educating people on diet, encouraged vegetarianism and, during the smallpox epidemic of 1910, nursed the local people. Determined to establish a hospital for local poor people, she travelled to the United States to raise funds.

There she took the opportunity to study American nursing, met leading Irish-Americans and became more politicised to Ireland's cause. Upon her return to Kerry she established a hospital in Caherdaniel later in 1910. She renamed the area Ballincoona (Baile an Chúnaimh, 'the home of help'), but it was unsuccessful and eventually closed for lack of money. She wrote on health matters for The Englishwoman and Fortnightly, among other journals, was a member of the council of the National Council of Trained Nurses and gave evidence to the royal commission on venereal disease in 1914.

== Irish War of Independence ==
Ní Bhruadair was a staunch supporter of the 1916 Rising. She joined both Cumann na mBan and Sinn Féin. She visited some of the 1,800 Irish republican internees held by the British in Frongoch internment camp in Wales, and wrote to the newspapers with practical advice for intending visitors. She canvassed for various Sinn Féin candidates during the general election of 1918 and was a Sinn Féin member on Kerry county council (1919–21), becoming one of its reserve chairpersons. During the War of Independence she sheltered IRA volunteers and consequently her home became the target for Black and Tans attacks.

Along with Dr Kathleen Lynn she worked with the Irish White Cross to distribute food to the dependents of IRA volunteers. By the end of the War of Independence she had become hardened by the suffering she had seen and was by now implacably opposed to British rule in Ireland. She became one of the most vociferous voices against the Anglo-Irish Treaty of 6 December 1921. She became a firebrand speaker at meetings in the staunchly republican West Kerry area. In April 1923 she was shot by Free State troops and arrested. She was subsequently imprisoned in the North Dublin Union, where she followed the example of other republicans and went on hunger strike. She was released two weeks later. Following the formation of Fianna Fáil by Éamon de Valera in 1926, Ní Bhruadair continued to support the more hardline Sinn Féin.

In October 1926 she represented Munster at the party's Ardfheis. She owned the party's semi-official organ, Irish Freedom, from 1926 to 1937, where she frequently contributed articles and in its later years acted as editor. Her home became the target of the Free State government forces in 1929 following an upsurge in violence from anti-Treaty republicans against the government. She and her close friend Mary MacSwiney left Cumann na mBan following the decision by its members at their 1933 convention to pursue social radicalism. The two then established an all-women's nationalist movement named Mná na Poblachta, which failed to attract many new members.

== Death ==
She continued to speak Irish and regularly attended Conradh na Gaeilge branch meetings in Tralee. Although sympathetic to Catholicism, she remained a member of the Anglican Church of Ireland, and regularly played the harmonium at Sneem's Church of Ireland services. Described by a biographer as 'a woman of frugal habits and decided opinions, she was in many ways difficult and eccentric', Gobnait Ní Bhruadair died on 16 January 1955, and was buried in the Church of Ireland graveyard in Sneem, County Kerry.

In her will she left most of her wealth (£17,000) to republicans "as they were in the years 1919 to 1921". The vagueness of her bequest led to legal wrangles for decades. Finally, in February 1979, Mr Justice Seán Gannon ruled that the bequest was void for remoteness, as it was impossible to determine which republican faction met her criteria.
