= 1875 Mid Surrey by-election =

UK Parliamentary by-election

The 1875 Mid Surrey by-election was fought on 24 November 1875 in Surrey, England. The by-election was fought due to the resignation (Justice of the Court of Appeal) of the incumbent Conservative MP, Richard Baggallay. It was won by the Conservative candidate Sir Trevor Lawrence who was unopposed.
