= Edith Mary Gell =

Writer and Christian activist (1860–1944)

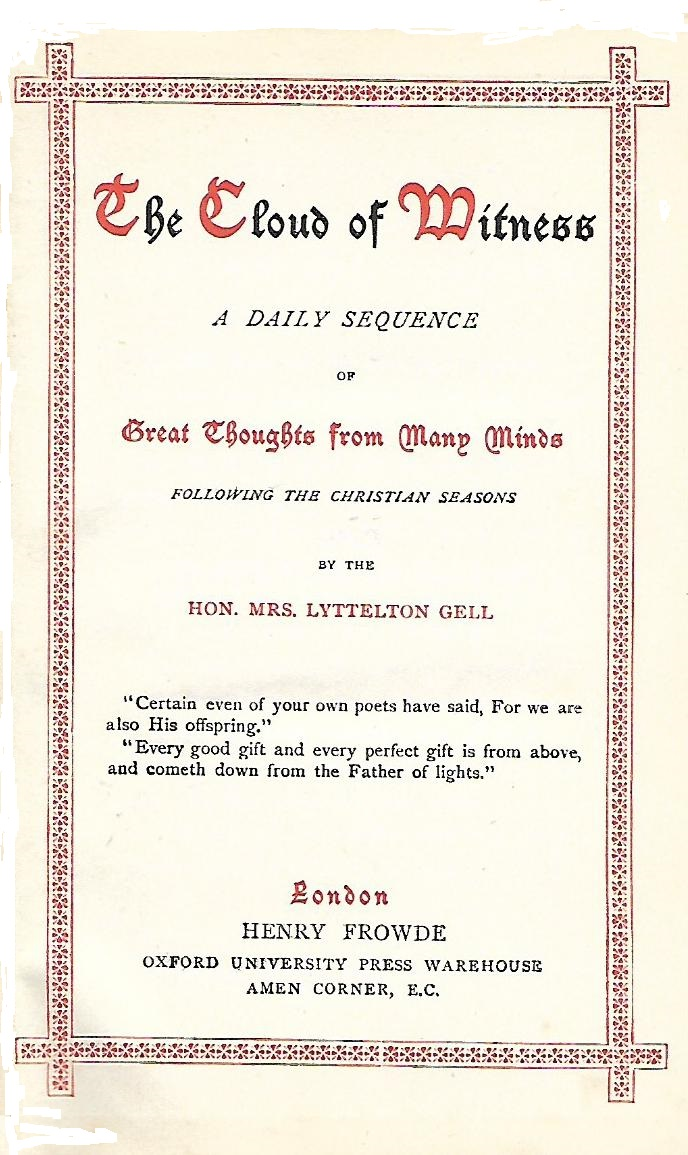
Title page of the book The Cloud of Witness, published in 1891

The Honourable Edith Mary Gell (née Brodrick; 1860–1944) was a writer and Christian activist, also known as Edith Lyttleton Gell and Edith Brodrick Gell.

== Family ==
Born in 1860, she was the fourth daughter of William Brodrick, 8th Viscount Midleton and Augusta, daughter of the 1st Baron Cottesloe. She was the sister of William St John Fremantle Brodrick, 1st Earl of Midleton (1856–1942), a distinguished politician who was Secretary of State for War from 1900 to 1903 and Secretary of State for India from 1903 to 1905. She married Philip Lyttleton Gell (1852–1926) on 25 July 1889. The marriage was without offspring. She died on 17 April 1944.

== Reputation ==
Journalist Hazel Southam has compared Gell's activities with those of characters in the television series Downton Abbey. Gell was very active in the local community and supported local families through Mothers' Union. She also ran "a Sunday morning children’s service until shortly before her death in 1944".

Gell is described in the National Archive entry for Hopton Hall as follows:

An indefatigable writer of devotional poems, hymns, and moralistic pageants and tracts, Edith Lyttelton Gell strongly supported traditional family values. She was prominent in organisations such as the Mothers' Union, the Central Church Union and the Union of Women Workers. Derbyshire church matters were another interest and she involved herself in both Carsington and Wirksworth parishes. Deeply conventional in outlook, Edith Lyttelton Gell for many years published or circulated her writings amongst her extended family and social circle. She reached a wider readership with her memoirs, 'Under Three Reigns'.

== Social connections ==
Being of the aristocracy, Edith Gell was well-connected and she gives an entertaining account of the people she knew in her autobiography: Under Three Reigns. When she was married, she was presented to Queen Victoria and describes her experience at court as follows:

The actual entry into the Throne Room was really dignified. Each lady as she entered the communicating broad corridor had her train spread out in all its glory. On your left was a great mirror which contributed to an appropriately stately carriage; the march had to be slow as the train in front occupied the ground. If you were a Peeress the Queen embraced you; if not, you kissed her hand, remembering to put your hand beneath her wrist so as to give the salute gracefully as you rose from your curtsey. If you were adroit, you got in three more to the chief Royalties, and one to the lesser lights, before your beautiful train was unceremoniously bundled over your arm by an usher, and you went out at the other end of the Presence Chamber backwards.

She and her husband were friends of the poet Alfred Tennyson and she gives the following account of him:

The poet Tennyson was a far-off neighbour, and came over occasionally to Garden Parties. He abhorred being lionised, and made a point of emitting the most commonplace remarks to fend off the gush he detested. In the tea-room he turned to my Mother, ham sandwich in hand, and [p.90] electrified her by inquiring: ”How do you cure your ham?” She replied that it was doubtless salted in the usual way. “Oh! but that is all wrong”, he exclaimed; “it should be soaked in treacle and then smoked”, adding mischievously as he saw her astonishment: “This is like eating my old boots!” He had been so pestered that he found the only method of defence was an abruptness bordering on brutality. Yet in his own home he was a different creature. Lady Tennyson was a relation of my husband’s, and after our marriage we visited them both at Farringford and at Aldworth. He had his moods, of course, like all men of genius, but once you were inside his guard all was well.

== Publications ==
As listed in her Who Was Who profile:

- 1891 – The Cloud of Witness – a collection of quotations on a Christian theme.
- 1892 – Squandered Girlhood
- 1898 – The More Excellent Way
- 1899 – The Vision of Righteousness
- 1908 – The Forces of the Spirit
- 1912 – The Menace of Secularism
- 1914 – The Happy Warrior – a book with Biblical quotes for every day of the year
- 1915 – Problems for Speakers
- 1916 – The Empire’s Honour; Influence of Women of the Early Church in Britain; Conquering and to Conquer; The Blessed Company.
- 1917 – Wedded Life; The Churchwoman’s Vote
- 1918 – The Empire’s Destiny
- 1919 – The New Girl; Womanhood and Fellowship; The Resurrection of a Nation; The Liberation of Spiritual Force; Womanhood at the Crossroads
- 1920 – The New Crusaders
- 1921 – Our Mother Earth
- 1922 – The Spirit of the Home
- 1924 – Look Before You Leap
- 1927 – Under Three Reigns: 1860-1920 - her autobiography
- 1929 – Heaven in Daily Life
- 1930 – John Franklin’s Bride; Ways and Signposts
- 1931 – The Ideal of Stillness
- 1932 – Live Gloriously
- 1933 – Build
- 1934 – Hopton Hymns
- 1935 – Jubilee Musical Masque
