= St John Brodrick, 1st Earl of Midleton =

British politician (1856–1942)

The Right Honourable The Earl of Midleton KP PC DL
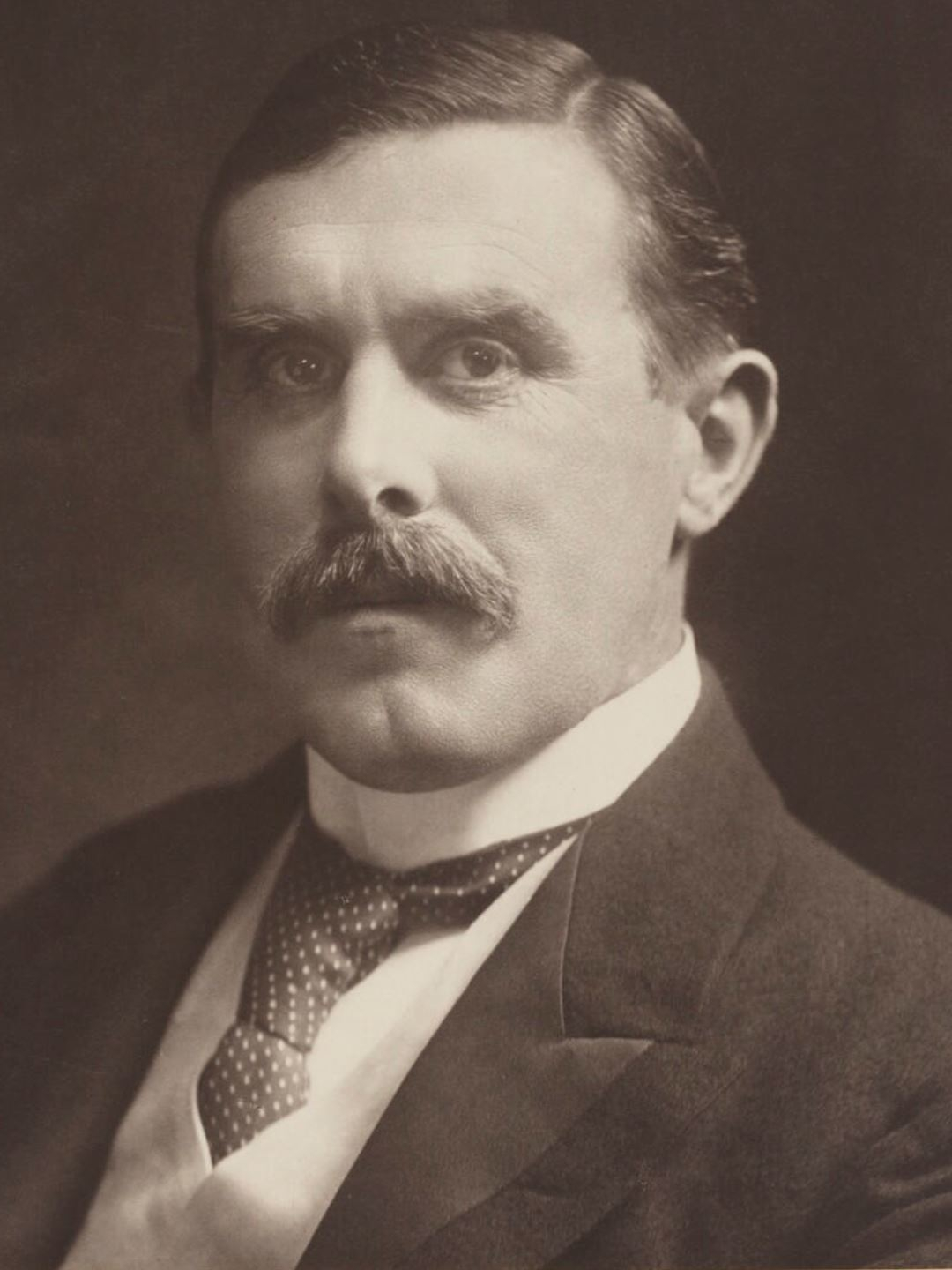

Secretary of State for War
- In office 12 November 1900 – 12 October 1903
- Monarchs: Victoria; Edward VII
- Prime Minister: The Marquess of Salisbury; Arthur Balfour
- Preceded by: The Marquess of Lansdowne
- Succeeded by: H. O. Arnold-Forster

Secretary of State for India
- In office 9 October 1903 – 4 December 1905
- Monarch: Edward VII
- Prime Minister: Arthur Balfour
- Preceded by: Lord George Hamilton
- Succeeded by: John Morley

Leader of the Irish Unionist Alliance
- In office 1910–1919
- Preceded by: Sir Edward Carson
- Succeeded by: Lord Farnham

Personal details
- Born: 14 December 1856
- Died: 13 February 1942 (aged 85)
- Party: Conservative (until 1891); Irish Unionist Alliance (1891–1919); Unionist Anti-Partition League (1919–1922)
- Spouse(s): (1) Lady Hilda Charteris (died 1901) (2) Madeleine Stanley (1876–1966)
- Children: 1 son, 4 daughters
- Parent(s): William Brodrick, 8th Viscount Midleton & Hon. Augusta Mary Fremantle
- Education: Balliol College, Oxford

William St John Fremantle Brodrick, 1st Earl of Midleton, KP, PC, DL (14 December 1856 – 13 February 1942), styled as St John Brodrick until 1907 and as Viscount Midleton between 1907 and 1920, was a British Conservative and Irish Unionist Alliance politician. He served as a Member of Parliament (MP) from 1880 to 1906, as a government minister from 1886 to 1892 and from 1895 to 1900, and as a Cabinet minister from 1900 to 1905.

== Background and education ==
Brodrick came of a mainly south-west Surrey family who in the early 17th century, in Sirs St John and Thomas Brodrick, were granted land in the south of Ireland, mainly in County Cork. The former settled at Midleton, between Cork and Youghal in 1641; and his son Alan Brodrick (1660–1728), Speaker of the Irish House of Commons and Lord Chancellor of Ireland, was created Baron Brodrick in 1715 and Viscount Midleton in 1717 in the Irish peerage.

In 1796 the title of Baron Brodrick in the Peerage of Great Britain was created. The English family seat at Peper Harow, near Godalming, Surrey, was designed by Sir William Chambers. His father The 8th Viscount Midleton was a conservative in politics, holding seats West Surrey and Guildford in the House of Commons (November 1885 – January 1906), and who was responsible in the House of Lords for carrying the Infant Life Protection Act 1872, which helped regulate the practice of baby farming. William was educated at Windlesham, Eton and Balliol College, Oxford, where he served as president of the Oxford Union. He was awarded a Doctorate of Laws (LLD) by Trinity College, Dublin. He owned, in submissions from his landowning heyday, about 5,000 acres (20 km^{2}).

He maintained three homes: Peper Harow (House); 34 Portland Place, London (telephone number on the Langham exchange); Midleton (House), Ireland. His family-settled land was probated before his widow's death in 1943 at £68,290 (equivalent to about £2,690,000 in 2025) and £55,624 in other assets in 1942.

== Political career ==
Brodrick entered Parliament as Conservative member for West Surrey in 1880. In 1883 he was appointed to a Royal Commission examining the condition of Irish prisons. He was Financial Secretary to the War Office 1886–92; Under-Secretary of State for War, 1895–1898; Parliamentary Under-Secretary of State for Foreign Affairs, 1898–1900; Secretary of State for War, 1900–1903; and Secretary of State for India, 1903–05.

He was Secretary of State for War during most of the Second Boer War (1899–1902). He thus had the responsibility of defending the British use of concentration camps in parliament. The conflict itself showed that the British army was not prepared for the guerrilla war of the Boers. He therefore initiated (though successors played a bigger part) a period of reform of the British army, which was focused on lessening the emphasis placed on mounted units in combat. In September 1902, Brodrick and Lord Roberts, the Commander-in-Chief of the army, visited Germany as guests to attend the German army maneuvers. In January 1903 he visited Malta and Gibraltar and inspected the garrisons there.

In 1904, during a crisis in British relations with Russia, he became the first member of a Cabinet since 1714 to attend a meeting of the Privy Council without being summoned to it by the monarch. At the general election of January 1906, which resulted in a Liberal win (the biggest landside except for that of the 1931 National Government's Conservatives), he lost his Parliamentary seat, at Guildford, which he had held since 1885. From March 1907 to 1913 he was an alderman of London County Council.

From 1910 he was regarded as the nominal leader of the Irish Unionist Alliance (IUA) in Southern Ireland, while Sir Edward Carson led the party in Ulster (the Ulster Unionist Council). Many Irish followers and sympathisers saw him as remote or condescending, reliant on a few intimates and suspected he was more interested in promotion in British politics. In 1916 Midleton's lobbying helped to defeat an attempt to implement immediate Home Rule with Ulster exclusion; this was supported by the Ulster leader Edward Carson and the Home Ruler John Redmond, but Midleton believed it would be disastrous for the Southern Unionist minority, and called attention to the need to protect them from discriminatory taxation.

In 1918, during the second, final year of his service on the Irish Convention, he tried to reach a compromise with Redmond which would allow Home Rule without partition subject to certain financial restrictions. This was rejected both by Redmond's followers (who saw it as too restrictive) and the hardline IUA rank-and-file, who deposed Midleton. He and his followers then formed the Unionist Anti-Partition League, an elite body mainly concerned with lobbying. It had some influence on the 1920 Government of Ireland Act, but none of the safeguards for Southern Unionist interests which it sought were included in the 1921 Anglo-Irish Treaty. Successful lobbying by Midleton and associated Southern Unionists was instrumental in ensuring their representation in the Seanad of the Irish Free State.

His speeches and/or questions in Parliament were in each year from 1880 to 1941, except 1906, when he held no seat, and 1940. They numbered 7,584, the last of which was a tribute to the passing of Lord Baden Powell.

== Honours and awards ==
Midleton was sworn into the Privy Council as of 1897. During his 1902 visit to Germany, he received the Grand Cross of the Prussian Order of the Red Eagle.

He received the Honorary Freedom and was appointed a Liveryman of the Worshipful Company of Broderers in 1902, his family having been associated with the company since the early 17th century.

He was appointed a Knight of the Order of St Patrick (KP) on 18 April 1916.

In the 1920 New Year Honours he was elevated in the British peerage system to Earl of Midleton, which became extinct with the death of his son in 1979. From 1930 he was High Steward of the Borough of Kingston upon Thames.

== Family ==
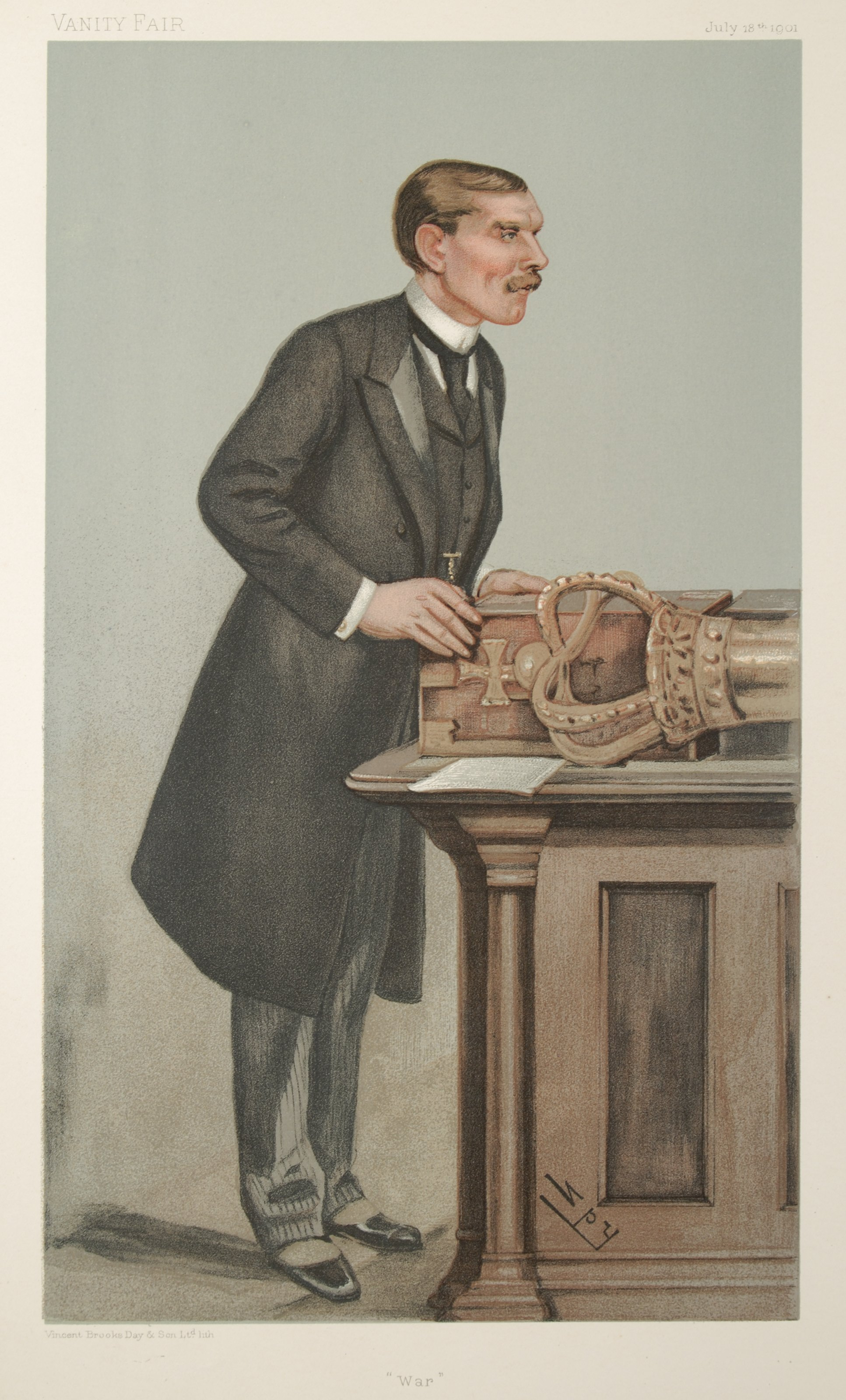
"War". Caricature by Spy published in Vanity Fair in 1901.

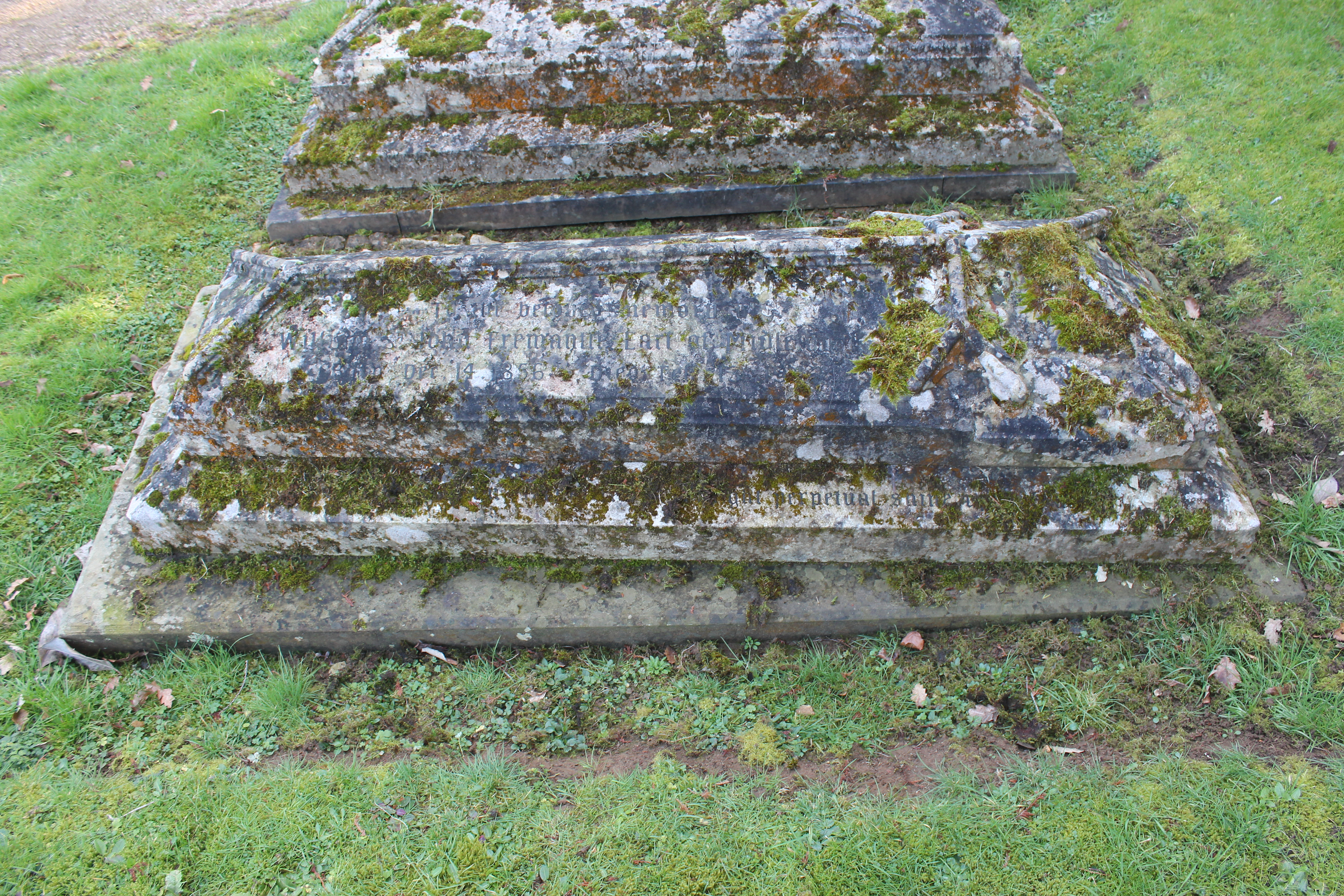
Grave in Peper Harow, Surrey

Brodrick married first, in 1880, Lady Hilda Charteris (died 1901), daughter of the 10th Earl of Wemyss, by whom he had five children:

- Lady Muriel Brodrick (1881–1966), who married in 1901 Dudley Marjoribanks, 3rd Baron Tweedmouth (1874–1935) and left two daughters.
- Lady Sybil Brodrick (1885–1935), was a maid of honour to Queen Mary 1911–1912, and married 1912 the diplomat Sir Ronald William Graham (1870–1949), no children.
- George Brodrick, 2nd Earl of Midleton (1888–1979)
- Lady Aileen Hilda Brodrick (1890–1970), who married in 1913 mountaineer and author Charles Francis Meade (1881–1975), by whom she had three daughters and a son.
- Lady Moyra Brodrick (1897–1982), who married in 1922 General Sir Henry Charles Loyd (1891–1973), by who she had a son and a daughter.

After the death of his first wife, Brodrick re-married at St George's, Hanover Square on 5 January 1903, Madeleine Cecilia Carlyle Stanley (1876–1966), daughter of Colonel Hon. John Constantine Stanley (son of the 2nd Baron Stanley of Alderley) and Mary Stewart-Mackenzie. His best man at the wedding was the Prime Minister, Arthur Balfour, and several members of the royal family attended. Madeleine Stanley′s mother had re-married the lawyer Sir Francis Jeune (later Baron St Helier), and her sister was married to the Conservative MP Augustus Henry Eden Allhusen. By this second marriage he had two sons:

- Major Hon. Francis Alan Stewart-MacKenzie of Seaforth (1910–1943) who changed his name on inheriting Brahan Castle. In 1937 he married Margaret Laetitia Lyell MBE (1912–1995) daughter of Major Hon.Charles Lyell MP. He died during the Battle of Salerno on 11 September 1943 (the day after his brother).
- Major Hon. Michael Victor Brodrick MC (1920–1943). He also died at the Battle of Salerno (the day before his brother).

His grandson Sir Julian St. John Loyd (by Lady Moyra) became land agent to Queen Elizabeth II at Sandringham. His daughter, Alexandra (Mrs Duncan Byatt), was a Lady-in-Waiting to Diana, Princess of Wales.

His sister, Hon. Marian Cecilia married Sir James Whitehead, son of the inventor Robert Whitehead. Sir James Whitehead was to become the British Ambassador to Austria, and his niece Agathe was the first wife of Georg von Trapp; the story of their children and his second wife, Maria von Trapp, was the basis of the musical The Sound of Music.

Another, Hon. Albinia, became an early supporter of Sinn Féin and became well known in Ireland under the name Gobnait Ní Bhruadair.

Another, Hon. Edith later Mrs. Lyttleton Gell was a published author of at least 24 works, such as The Cloud of Witness: A daily sequence of great thoughts from many minds and an autobiography, Under Three Reigns: 1860–1944.

== Publications ==
- Ireland, Dupe or Heroine, 1932
- Records and Reactions, 1856–1939, 1939

== Footnotes ==
Parliament of the United Kingdom
Preceded by Lee Steere; George Cubitt	Member of Parliament for West Surrey; 1880–1885; With: George Cubitt	Constituency abolished
Preceded by Denzil Onslow	Member of Parliament for Guildford; 1885–1906	Succeeded by Henry Cowan
Political offices
Preceded by The Lord Monkswell	Under-Secretary of State for War; 1895–1898	Succeeded by George Wyndham
Preceded by Hon. George Curzon	Under-Secretary of State for Foreign Affairs; 1898–1900	Succeeded by Viscount Cranborne
Preceded by The Marquess of Lansdowne	Secretary of State for War; 1900–1903	Succeeded by H. O. Arnold-Forster
Preceded by Lord George Hamilton	Secretary of State for India; 1903–1905	Succeeded by John Morley
Peerage of Ireland
Preceded by William Brodrick	Viscount Midleton; 1907–1942	Succeeded by George St John Brodrick
Peerage of the United Kingdom
New creation	Earl of Midleton; 1920–1942	Succeeded by George St John Brodrick
