= Henry Peek =

British politician and businessman

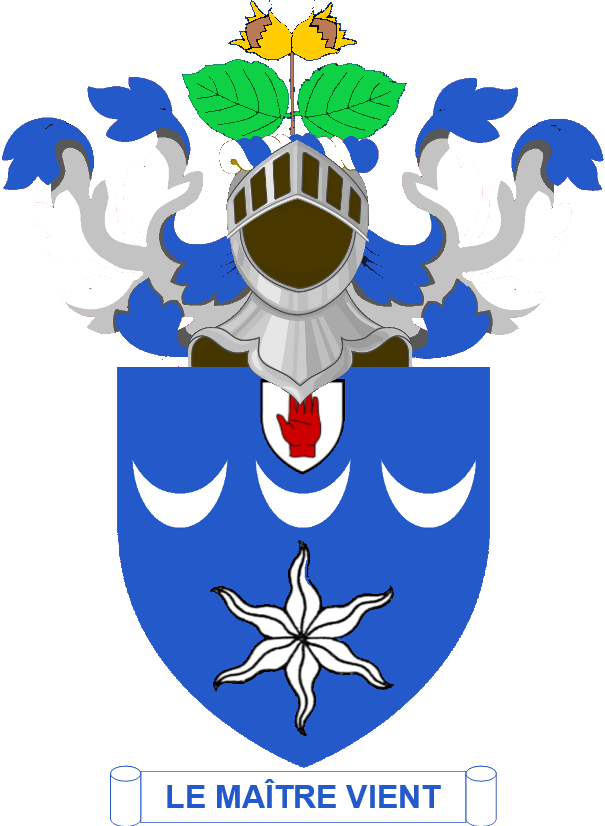
- Crest: Two hazel nuts, slipped proper.
- Shield: Azure an estoile Argent, in chief three crescents of the last.
- Motto: Le Maître Vient (The Master Comes)

Sir Henry William Peek, 1st Baronet DL (26 February 1825 – 26 August 1898) was an importer of spices, tea and other groceries, philanthropist and Conservative Member of Parliament (MP).

== Parents, marriage and residence ==
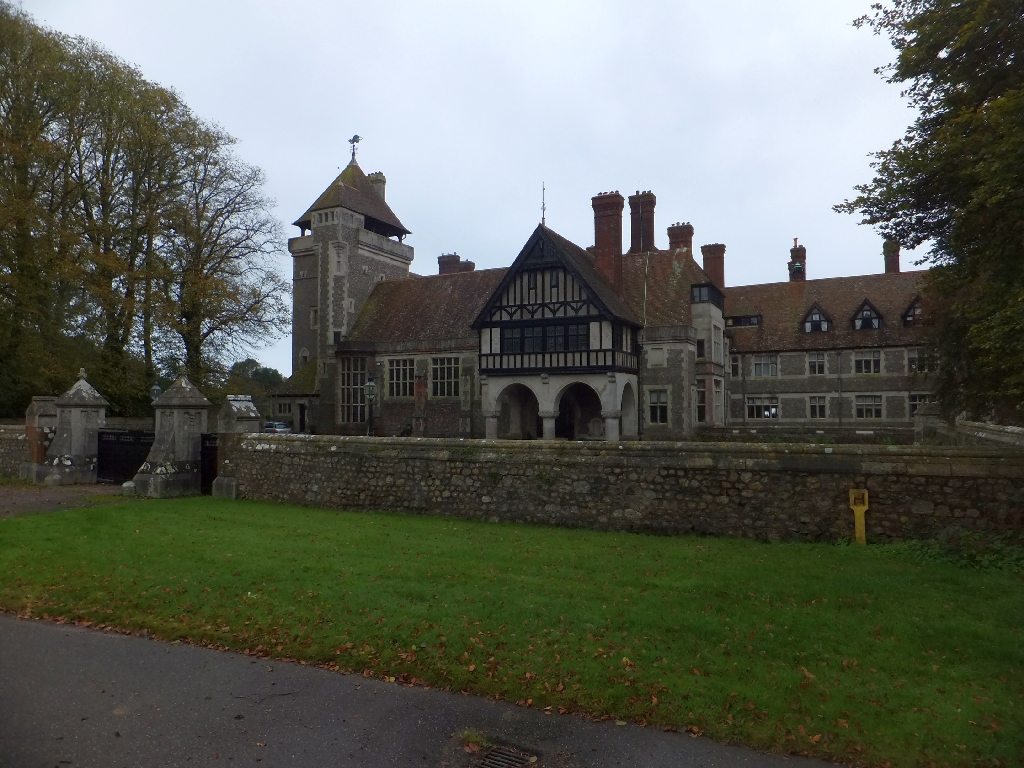
Peek House then known simply as Rousdon, as Peek created a village there in the parish of Combpyne, south-east Devon

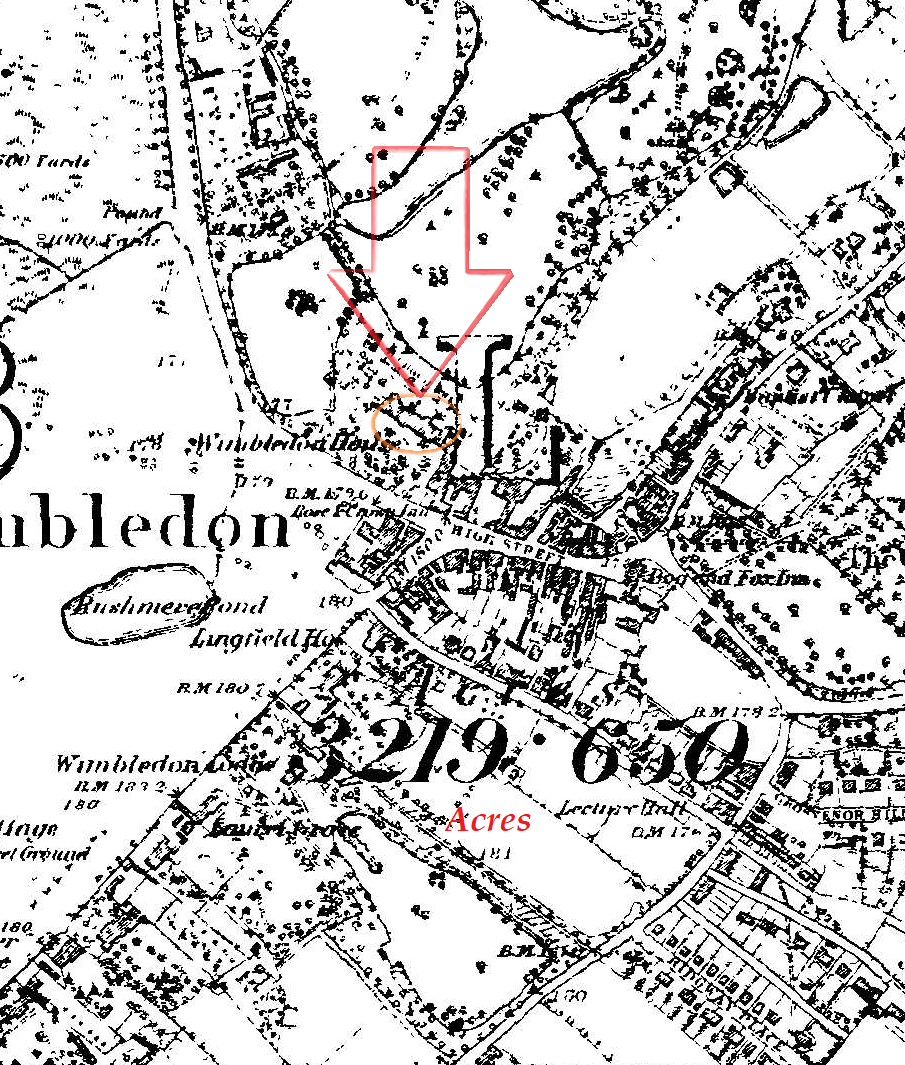
Position and size of his Georgian dominant house at the west end of its short high street and south of the extremely large Wimbledon Park, soon generally carved out around its edges into smaller mansions and the tennis venue.

Peek was born in 1825 to James Peek of Watcombe, Torquay, Devon and Elizabeth, his first wife.

He married in 1848, Margaret Maria (d 1884), second daughter of William Edgar of Clapham Common, Surrey.

Wimbledon House, Wimbledon Village stood near the west end of its short High Street, about 1/2 mile (0.80 km) west of the parish church. It was probably built about the middle of the 18th century. It housed Louis Joseph, Prince of Condé in some of his final years (died 1818), MP Joseph Marryat then after a time Peek. It was demolished about 1900-1902 passing to a building syndicate.

== Political work ==
At the 1865 general election he was an unsuccessful candidate in the Eastern division of Surrey but a new dual-member constituency was created along its western belt (Mid Surrey) under the Second Reform Act, where he was elected in 1868 MP. He was re-elected in his seat until his resignation in 1884. Hansard shows he made 93 speeches or questions in Parliament, from 1869 to 1884, contributing in each year.

== Title and legacy ==
He was made a baronet on 13 May 1874, of Rousdon in the County of Devon.

Sir Henry's probate was resworn in 1900 as leaving assets of £418,584.8 (equivalent to about £57,200,000 in 2023) and his son died the next year. His son in turn died in 1927, with assets of £172,685 and the baronetcy reached the fifth generation in 2004.

In Surrey Cranleigh's old Peek Institute was founded by Peek in memory of his late wife, namely a club, with reading and billiard rooms, and a library.

Parliament of the United Kingdom
New constituency	Member of Parliament for Mid Surrey; 1868 – 1884; With: William Brodrick to 1870; Richard Baggallay 1870–1875; Sir Trevor Lawrence, Bt from 1875	Succeeded by Sir Trevor Lawrence, Bt; Sir John Whittaker Ellis, Bt
Baronetage of the United Kingdom
New creation	Baronet (of Rousdon); 1874 – 1898	Succeeded by Cuthbert Edgar Peek
