= Redgrave v Hurd =

- Court: Court of Appeal
- Decided: 28 November 1881
- Citation: (1881) 20 Ch D 1

Court membership
- Judges sitting: Jessel MR Baggallay LJ and Lush LJ

Keywords
- Misrepresentation, rescission, reliance

Redgrave v Hurd (1881) 20 Ch D 1 is an English contract law case, concerning misrepresentation. It holds that a contract can be rescinded for innocent misrepresentation, even where the representee also had the chance to verify the false statement.

== Facts ==
Mr Redgrave, an elderly solicitor, advertised for a partner to join the business and buy the accompanying house. He said in an interview with Mr Hurd that the practice brought in £300 a year, when it was only £200 a year. Mr Redgrave showed him summaries that came to a £200 a year average income and said that the rest of the £300 figure was borne out by other papers in the office that he could check (in fact they showed no business). Mr Hurd did not inspect the papers, until he realised the truth just before completion of the agreement. He had signed the contract but he refused to go through. Mr Redgrave sued for specific performance and Mr Hurd counterclaimed for rescission based on fraudulent misrepresentation.

Fry J held that because Mr Hurd had not taken the opportunity to check through the papers, he could not be taken to have relied on them. Mr Hurd appealed.

== Judgment ==
Sir George Jessel MR held that Mr Hurd’s counterclaim for fraudulent misrepresentation failed because there was no plea that Mr Redgrave knew his statements were untrue. Therefore, there was no entitlement to damages. Nevertheless, Fry J’s decision was reversed, and the contract was rescinded on grounds of innocent misrepresentation. He held that relying on the representation was enough and there was no duty to inspect the papers. For rescission, he noted the difference of law (knowledge was necessary) and equity, where the approach was ‘A man is not to be allowed to say… that when he made it he did not know it to be false; he ought to have found that out before he made it’ and ‘no man ought to seek to take advantage of his own false statements’. If a man is induced to enter a contract by a false representation it is not a sufficient answer to him to say, ‘If you had used due diligence you would have found out that the statement was untrue. You had the means afforded you of discovering its falsity, and did not choose to avail yourself of them... If it is a material representation calculated to induce him to enter into the contract, it is an inference of law that he was induced by the representation to enter into it’ and so it is for the person alleging otherwise to show it.

Baggallay and Lush LJJ concurred.

== See also ==
- English contract law
- Misrepresentation in English law
