= Richard Laurence =

Hebraist, Anglican churchman, Irish bishop (1760–1838)

The Right Reverend and Right Honourable Richard Laurence PC (Ire), DCL
- Archbishop of Cashel
- Church: Church of Ireland
- Archdiocese: Cashel
- Appointed: 28 June 1822
- In office: 1822-1838
- Predecessor: Charles Brodrick
- Successor: Stephen Creagh Sandes

Orders
- Consecration: 21 July 1822 by Lord John Beresford

Personal details
- Born: 13 May 1760 Bath, Somerset, England
- Died: 28 December 1838 (aged 78) Dublin, County Dublin, Ireland
- Buried: Christ Church Cathedral, Dublin
- Denomination: Anglican
- Parents: Richard Laurence & Elizabeth French
- Spouse: Mary Vaughan
- Children: 1

Richard Laurence (13 May 1760 – 28 December 1838) was an English Hebraist and Anglican churchman. He was made Regius Professor of Hebrew and canon of Christ Church, Oxford, in 1814, and Archbishop of Cashel, Ireland, in 1822.

Laurence, younger brother of jurist French Laurence, was born in Bath and was educated at Bath Grammar School and at Corpus Christi College, Oxford. His chief contribution to Biblical scholarship was his study of the Ethiopic versions of certain pseudepigrapha: Ascensio Isaiæ Vatis (Oxford, 1819); Primi Ezræ Libri ... Versio Æthiopica (ib. 1820); The Book of Enoch the Prophet (ib. 1821; other ed. 1832, 1838), from a manuscript in the Bodleian Library brought from Abyssinia by James Bruce; these were all provided with Latin and English translations. Though these editions have been superseded, through the discovery of better texts and the employment of better critical methods, Laurence is entitled to the credit of having revived the study of Ethiopic, which had been neglected in England since the time of Walton. He published also The Book of Job (Dublin, 1828) — the Authorized Version, arranged in conformity with the Masoretic Text.

He died in Dublin in 1838.
