= Cuthbert Peek =

English astronomer and meteorologist

Sir Cuthbert Edgar Peek, 2nd Baronet (30 January 1855 – 6 July 1901) was an astronomer and meteorologist, and took part in activities of several learned societies.

== Life ==
Peek was born at Wimbledon, London on 30 Jan. 1855, the only child of Sir Henry William Peek, 1st Baronet, of Wimbledon House, Wimbledon, Surrey, a partner in the firm of Messrs. Peek Brothers & Co., colonial merchants, of East Cheap, and MP for East Surrey from 1868 to 1884. His mother was Margaret Maria, second daughter of William Edgar of Eagle House, Clapham Common. Cuthbert, after education at Eton College, entered Pembroke College, Cambridge, in 1876 and graduated BA in 1880, proceeding MA in 1884. A Freemason, he was initiated into Isaac Newton University Lodge while a student at Cambridge.

=== In Iceland and Australia ===
After leaving Cambridge he went through a course of astronomy and surveying, and put his knowledge to practical use in two journeys, made in 1881, into unfrequented parts of Iceland, where he took regular observations of latitude and longitude and dip of the magnetic needle (cf. his account, Geographical Society Journal, 1882, pages 129-140). On his return he set up a small observatory in the grounds of his father's house at Wimbledon, where he observed with a 3-inch equatorially mounted telescope.

In 1882 Peek spent six weeks at his own expense at Jimbour, Queensland, for the purpose of observing the transit of Venus across the sun's disc in December 1882. There, with his principal instrument, an equatorially mounted Merz telescope of 6.4 inches, he observed, in days preceding the transit, double stars and star-clusters, paying special attention to the nebula round η Argus, one of the wonders of the Southern sky, which he described in a memoir. Observations of the transit were prevented by cloud. Peek made extensive travels in Australia and New Zealand, bringing back with him many curious objects to add to his father's collection at Rousdon, Devon.

=== Scientific work ===
In 1884 he established, on his father's estate at Rousdon, a meteorological station of the second order, and in the same year he set up there an astronomical observatory to contain the 6.4 inch Merz telescope and a transit instrument with other accessories. With the aid of his assistant Charles Grover, he began a systematic observation of the variation of brightness of long-period variable stars, by Argelander's method, and on a plan consistent with that of the Harvard College Observatory.

Annual reports were sent to the Royal Astronomical Society, which Peek joined in 1884, and short sets of observations were occasionally published in pamphlet form. The complete series of the observations of 22 stars extending over sixteen years were collected at Peek's request by Professor Herbert Hall Turner of Oxford and published by him after Peek's death in Memoirs of the Royal Astronomical Society (volume 55). The introduction to the volume contains a section written by Peek in 1896 explaining his astronomical methods. With similar system regular observations were made with his meteorological instruments, and these were collected and published in annual volumes.

=== Learned societies ===
On his father's death on 26 August 1898, Peek succeeded to the baronetcy and to the estates that his father had bought in Surrey and Devon. He was elected Fellow of the Society of Antiquaries of London in 1890, was honorary secretary of the Anthropological Society of London, and often served on the council or as a vice-president of the Royal Meteorological Society between 1884 and his death. He endowed the Royal Geographical Society, of whose council he was a member, with a medal for the advancement of geographical knowledge. Interested in shooting, he presented a challenge cup and an annual prize to be shot for by members of the Cambridge University Volunteer Corps.

Peek died in Brighton on 6 July 1901 of "congestion of the brain", and was buried at Rousdon.

== Family ==
In 1884 he married Augusta Louisa Brodrick, eldest daughter of William Brodrick, 8th Viscount Midleton. She survived him with two sons and four daughters. Their elder son Wilfrid (1884–1927) succeeded to the baronetcy.

Baronetage of the United Kingdom
Preceded by Henry Peek	Baronet (of Rousdon); 1898–1901	Succeeded by Wilfrid Peek
