= Richard Woodward (bishop) =

English Protestant cleric

Bishop Woodward by Thomas Gainsborough.

Richard Woodward (1726 – 12 May 1794) was an English Protestant cleric, active in Ireland during the 18th century. Educated at the University of Oxford, he moved to Ireland and would become the author of a vigorous defence of the Protestant Ascendancy in Ireland. Woodward was made an Anglican Bishop of Cloyne in the Church of Ireland.

== Origins and education ==
Richard Woodward was the son of Francis Woodward, of Grimsbury, near Bristol. He was educated by Josiah Tucker, the Dean of Gloucester, before attending Wadham College, Oxford, where he took the degree of Bachelor of Civil Law in 1749 and Doctor of Civil Law in 1759.

== Career ==
Between 1764 and 1781 Woodward was Dean of Clogher and between 1772 and 1778 he was Chancellor of St. Patrick's Cathedral, Dublin. In May 1778 he exchanged the latter position for the rectory of Louth. In 1781 he was raised to the episcopy as Bishop of Cloyne, being consecrated on 4 February 1781 at Christ Church Cathedral, Dublin, by the Archbishop of Dublin and the Bishops of Ossory and Clonfert. He continued to serve as Bishop of Cloyne until his death on 12 May 1794.

== Works and writings ==
Richard Woodward’s best known work was The Present State of the Church of Ireland, Containing a Description of it’s [sic] Precarious Situation; and the Consequent Danger to the Public, Recommended to the Serious consideration of the Friends of the Protestant Interest, to which are Subjoined, Some Reflections on the Impracticability of a Proper Commutation of Tithes; and a General Account of the Origin and Progress of the Insurrection in Munster (Dublin: W. Sleater 1787), the subject matter of which is sufficiently delineated in its title. It proved a controversial and successful tract, running rapidly through seven editions and “evinced the force of the author’s arguments, by the violent enmity which it excited against him in all the enemies of the Church”. Both the controversy and the success may be explained in part by such sentences as: “I need not tell the Protestant proprietor of land, that the security of his title depends very much (if not entirely) on the Protestant ascendancy; or that the preservation of that ascendancy depends entirely on an indissoluble connection between the Sister Kingdoms.”

Richard Woodward could not, however, be easily dismissed as a bigot. As his memorial in his cathedral church records, “He was an eloquent and distinguished Advocate in the House of Peers for the Repeal of the Roman Catholic Penal Statutes in 1782”.

Woodward also took a keen interest in the plight of the Irish poor and, while Dean of Clogher, wrote both An Argument in support of the Right of the Poor in Ireland to a national Provision (Dublin, 1772) and An Address to the Public on the Expediency of a regular Plan for the Maintenance and Government of the Poor (Dublin, 1775). His memorial records that he planned and was in 1773 the principal Institutor of the House of Industry in Dublin.

He also published a Charge delivered to the Clergy at the Visitation in July, 1793 (Cork, 1793).

According to John Wesley, who attended a service in the church at Clogher in 1771, where “the congregation was not only large, but remarkably well-behaved”, Woodward was one of the best readers he had heard and “one of the most easy, natural preachers”.

== Family ==
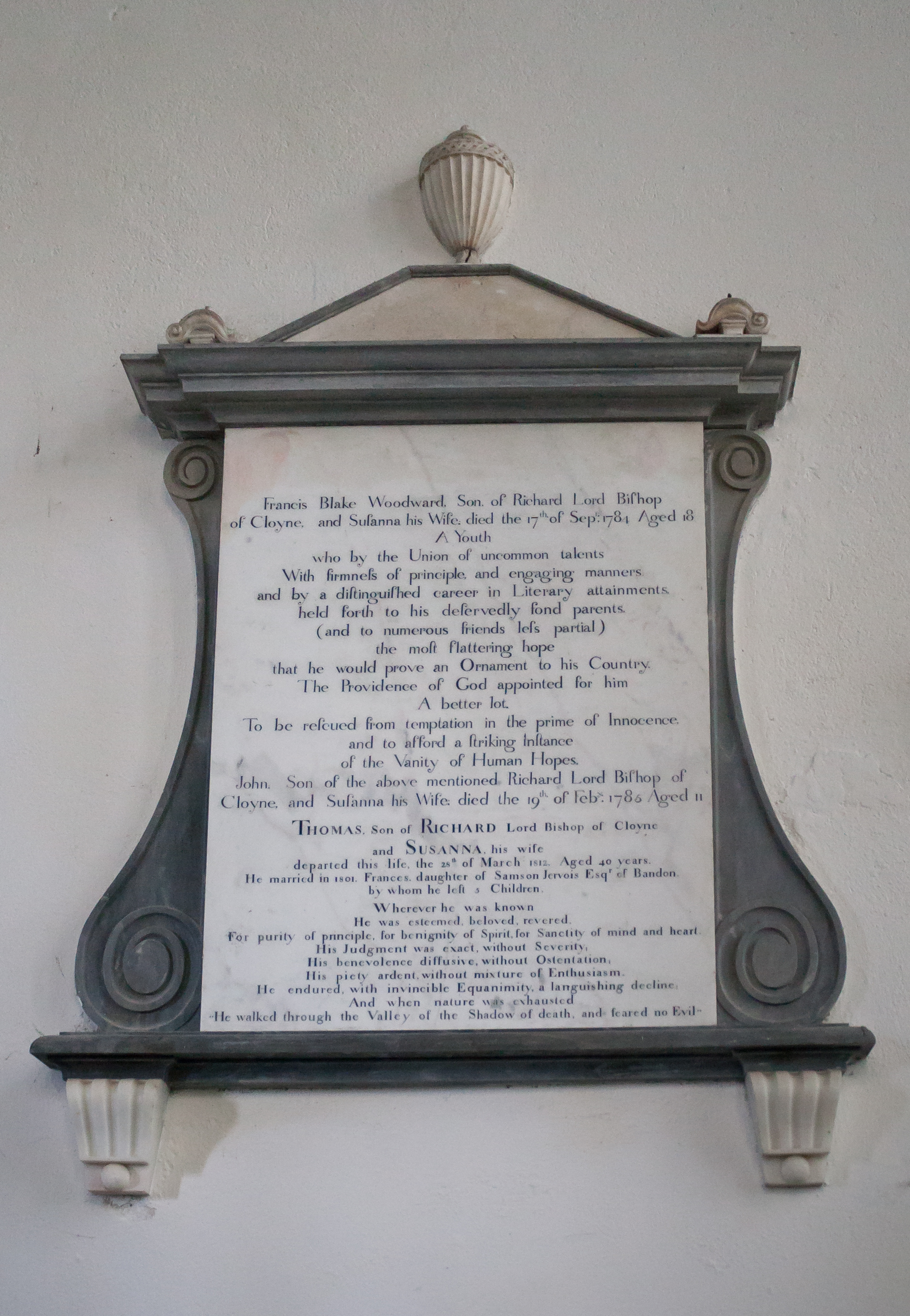
Memorial plaque in the north transept of Cloyne Cathedral dedicated to Woodwards children Francis Blake (died 1784, aged 18), John (died 1785, aged 11), and Thomas (died 1812, aged 40).

On 3 October 1763, Woodward married Susanna (d. 11 May 1795), the daughter of Richard Blake, of Bristol. Among their children, Richard (d. 1828) also entered the Church, becoming prebendary of Inniscarra in 1798, and Mary (1767–1799) married the Hon. Charles Brodrick, Archbishop of Cashel.
