= Charles Brodrick, 6th Viscount Midleton =

British nobleman

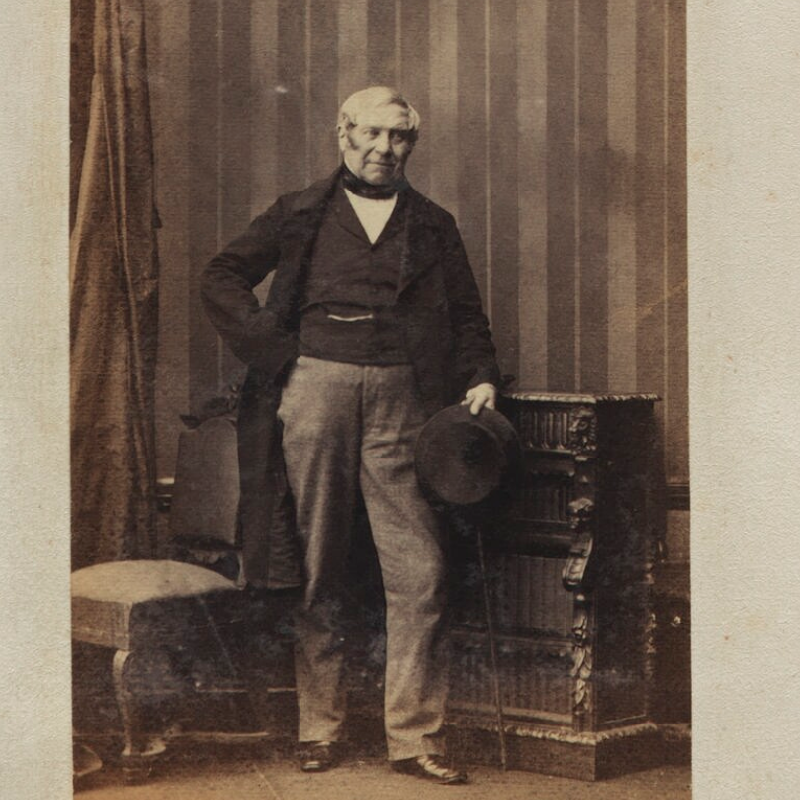
Charles Brodrick, by Camille Silvy, 14 June 1861,

Charles Brodrick, 6th Viscount Midleton (14 September 1791 – 2 December 1863) was a British nobleman.

The son of Charles Brodrick, Archbishop of Cashel, and Mary Woodward, he succeeded to the peerage on the 1 November 1848. He was educated at St John's College, Cambridge University and was admitted to Lincoln's Inn in 1813 to practice as a barrister. He married Emma Stapleton on the 5 May 1825, with whom he had two daughters: Mary Emma Brodrick (20 Feb 1826 – 25 May 1896) and Albinia Frances Brodrick (5 May 1831 – 18 Mar 1918), the latter being an ancestress of English writer/comedienne Phoebe Waller-Bridge.

Brodrick was an active member of several Anglican charities and missionary organisations, including the Society for the Propagation of the Gospel in Foreign Parts, Bath Church Missionary Society, Scripture Reader's Society for Ireland and the Society for Promoting Christianity Amongst the Jews.

Peerage of Ireland
Preceded by George Brodrick	Viscount Midleton; 1848–1863	Succeeded by William Brodrick
