= George Brodrick, 5th Viscount Midleton =

British nobleman

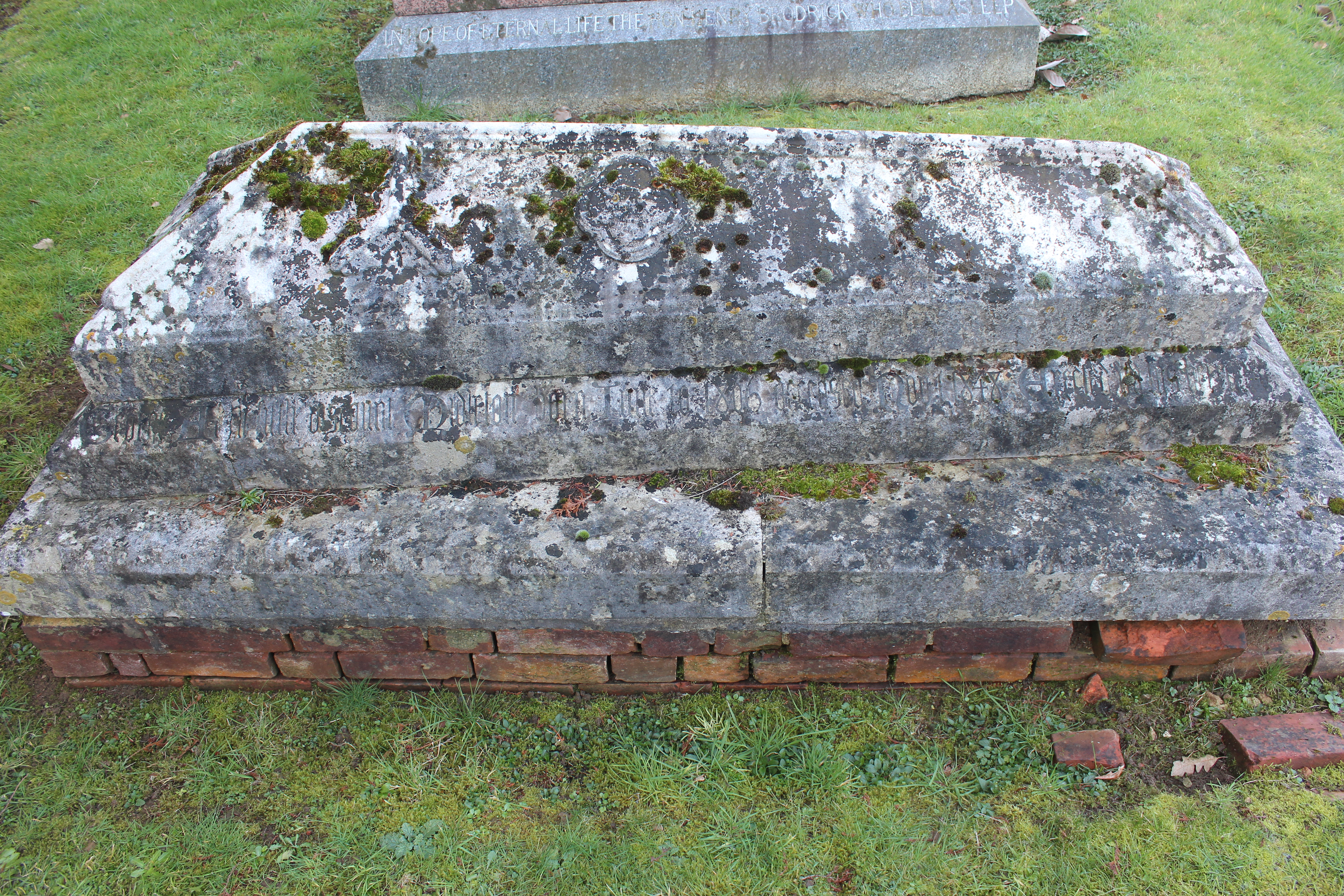
Grave in Peper Harow, Surrey

George Alan Brodrick, 5th Viscount Midleton (10 June 1806 – 1 November 1848) was a British nobleman.

The son of George Brodrick, 4th Viscount Midleton and Maria Benyon, he succeeded to the peerage in 1836. He was educated at Eton College. He married Ellen Griffiths in 1833.

He engaged the English architect, Decimus Burton, to make improvements in the streetscape of Cobh, County Cork.

His death, in November 1848, was attributed to intentional charcoal inhalation.

Peerage of Ireland
Preceded by George Brodrick	Viscount Midleton; 1836–1848	Succeeded by Charles Brodrick
