= Mid Surrey =

Former parliamentary constituency in the United Kingdom

- Former county constituency for the House of Commons
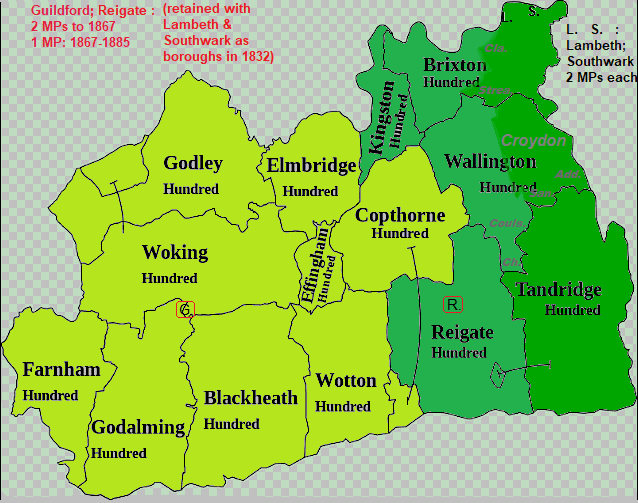
- This two-member area in turquoise green; the greens versus yellow shows the preceding, simpler, east/west division of the county.
- County: Surrey

1868–1885
- Seats: Two
- Created from: East Surrey
- Replaced by: large parts of Battersea; Wandsworth; Clapham and approximately: Epsom or (Mid-Southern); Kingston (or Mid-Northern) major parts of Wimbledon

Mid Surrey was a county constituency in Surrey, England: 1868 — 1885. It returned two Members of Parliament to the House of Commons of the UK Parliament elected by the bloc vote system.

== History ==
The constituency was created under the Second Reform Act for the 1868 general election, and abolished by the Redistribution of Seats Act 1885 for the 1885 general election.

Political history

The seat elected a brief series of Conservatives.

Successor seats

The 1885 Act took from 2 to 16 the metropolitan seats in the north-east of the county — that is the zone north-east of Wimbledon and Croydon coming from 1889 into the newly formed County of London. It also founded six single-member county constituencies (seats) to cover the rump bulk of the county, commonly referred to at the time as the non-metropolitan county. The Act thus abolished the West, Mid and East Surrey divisions double seat-areas that comprised the county. As Surrey was now split into single-representative areas this met a Chartist objective, discouraging the frequent collusion between candidates or parties which had beset multi-member constituencies (specifically plurality-at-large voting, for which "bloc(k) vote" in Britain was the term used). These six distinctly county (non-metropolitan) divisions the Act numbered, named (and detailed as summarised in outline below):

1. The North-Western or Chertsey Division (usually recorded as Chertsey, Surrey N.W. or North-West) - included Woking and Egham
2. The South-Western or Guildford Division (as style shown above) - included Godalming, Farnham and surrounds
3. The South-Eastern or Reigate Division (as style shown above) - included Dorking sessional division save for two parishes in No. 4.
4. The Mid or Epsom Division (as style shown above) - included Kingston's southern and eastern sessional division components
5. The Kingston Division (invariably Kingston or Kingston-upon-Thames) - included Richmond
6. The North-Eastern or Wimbledon Division (as style shown above) - included sessional division of Croydon except its core and north in the Metropolis; plus Caterham, Chelsham, Farley, Warlingham.

== Boundaries ==
1868–1885: The Hundreds of Kingston, Reigate and so much of that of Wallington as lay to the west of the parishes of Croydon and Sanderstead, and so much of the Hundred of Brixton as lay to the west of the parishes of Streatham, Clapham and Lambeth.

== Members of Parliament ==
Election	1st Member	1st Party	Main home	2nd Member	2nd Party	Main home
1868	Sir Henry Peek	Conservative	Wimbledon House, High Street, Wimbledon and Rousdon, Devon	William Brodrick	Conservative	Peper Harow House, Peper Harow
1870 by-election	Sir Henry Peek	Conservative	Wimbledon House, High Street, Wimbledon and Rousdon, Devon	Richard Baggallay	Conservative	55 Queen's Gate, South Kensington
1875 by-election	Sir Henry Peek	Conservative	Wimbledon House, High Street, Wimbledon and Rousdon, Devon	Sir Trevor Lawrence, Bt.	Conservative	Burford Lodge (in part since renamed Burford Bridge Hotel), Dorking
1884 by-election	Sir John Whittaker Ellis, Bt.	Conservative	Petersham Place, Byfleet	Sir Trevor Lawrence, Bt.	Conservative	Burford Lodge (in part since renamed Burford Bridge Hotel), Dorking
1885	constituency abolished					

== Election results ==
=== Elections in the 1860s ===
General election 1868: Mid Surrey
Party	Candidate	Votes	%	±%
Conservative	Henry Peek	4,487	29.6	
Conservative	William Brodrick	4,412	29.1	
Liberal	Julian Goldsmid	3,152	20.8	
Liberal	Charles Henry Robarts	3,090	20.4	
Independent Liberal	Thomas Marsh Nelson	7	0.1	
Majority		1,260	8.3	
Turnout		7,574 (est)	71.7 (est)	
Registered electors		10,565		
Conservative win (new seat)				
Conservative win (new seat)				

=== Elections in the 1870s ===
Brodrick succeeded to the peerage, becoming Viscount Midleton and causing a by-election.

By-election, 17 Oct 1870: Mid Surrey
Party	Candidate	Votes	%	±%
Conservative	Richard Baggallay	Unopposed		
Conservative hold				

General election 1874: Mid Surrey
Party	Candidate	Votes	%	±%
Conservative	Richard Baggallay	Unopposed		
Conservative	Henry Peek	Unopposed		
Registered electors		14,645		
Conservative hold				
Conservative hold				

Baggallay was appointed Solicitor General for England and Wales, requiring a by-election.

By-election, 16 Mar 1874: Mid Surrey
Party	Candidate	Votes	%	±%
Conservative	Richard Baggallay	Unopposed		
Conservative hold				

Baggallay was appointed a Judge of The Court of Appeal, and resigned.

By-election, 24 Nov 1875: Mid Surrey
Party	Candidate	Votes	%	±%
Conservative	Trevor Lawrence	Unopposed		
Conservative hold				

=== Elections in the 1880s ===
General election 1880: Mid Surrey
Party	Candidate	Votes	%	±%
Conservative	Henry Peek	8,475	30.0	N/A
Conservative	Trevor Lawrence	8,303	29.4	N/A
Liberal	Sydney Stern	5,770	20.4	New
Liberal	Joseph Napier Higgins	5,727	20.3	New
Majority		2,533	9.0	N/A
Turnout		14,138	69.2	N/A
Registered electors		20,433		
Conservative hold		Swing	N/A	
Conservative hold		Swing	N/A	

Peek's resignation caused a by-election.

By-election, 23 Jun 1884: Mid Surrey
Party	Candidate	Votes	%	±%
Conservative	John Whittaker Ellis	7,645	60.7	+1.3
Liberal	Sydney Stern	4,949	39.3	−1.4
Majority		2,696	21.4	+12.4
Turnout		12,594	47.0	−22.2
Registered electors		26,804		
Conservative hold		Swing	+1.4	
