= Charles Brodrick =

Irish clergyman

The Right Reverend and Right Honourable Charles Brodrick PC (Ire), D.D.
- Archbishop of Cashel
- Church: Church of Ireland
- Archdiocese: Cashel
- Appointed: 9 December 1801
- In office: 1801–1822
- Predecessor: Charles Agar
- Successor: Richard Laurence
- Previous posts: Bishop of Clonfert and Kilmacduagh (1795–1796); Bishop of Kilmore (1796–1801)

Orders
- Ordination: 9 December 1787 by Richard Woodward
- Consecration: 22 March 1795 by William Beresford

Personal details
- Born: May 3, 1761
- Died: May 6, 1822 (aged 61)
- Buried: Midleton, County Cork
- Denomination: Anglican
- Parents: George Brodrick & Albinia Townshend
- Spouse: Mary Woodward
- Children: 5

Charles Brodrick (3 May 1761 – 6 May 1822) was a reforming Irish clergyman and Archbishop of Cashel in the Church of Ireland.

== Origins and education ==
Brodrick was the third son of the 3rd Viscount Midleton and Albinia Townshend, sister of Viscount Sydney. He was educated, like his maternal uncle, at Clare Hall, Cambridge. His brothers included George Brodrick, 4th Viscount Midleton and General John Brodrick.

In 1787, he was ordained in Cloyne by the Bishop, his father-in-law, Richard Woodward, first deacon (24 August) and then priest (9 December). He was appointed Rector of Dingindonovan (or Dangan) and Prebendary of Killenemer, and established a reputation for himself by choosing to live in his remote parish "at a period when very lax notions prevailed respecting clerical residence". For a brief period in 1789, he was Prebendary of Donoughmore, before being appointed in June 1789 the Treasurer of Cloyne, where he served until 1795.

In 1795, Brodrick was consecrated as Bishop of Clonfert and Kilmacduagh, whence he was translated to Kilmore in 1796. In 1801, following the preferment of Charles Agar to Dublin, Brodrick was appointed Archbishop of Cashel and Emly (and Primate of Munster) in his place and remained in that post until his death in 1822, when he was succeeded by Richard Laurence. From 1811 until 1820, he also took on the administration of the diocese and province of Dublin, as a result of the mental incapacity of the Archbishop, Euseby Cleaver.

== Assessment ==
Brodrick was a committed ecclesiastical reformer. One obituary following his death described him as "a prelate of distinguished piety, and of the most exemplary attention to the duties of his high station, as evinced by his increasing vigilance in enforcing the residence of the clergy, and by his disinterested appointments to the vacant livings" in his diocese.

== Family and descendants ==
On 8 December 1786, Brodrick married Mary, the daughter of Richard Woodward, Bishop of Cloyne. Of their children, Charles and William succeeded eventually as, respectively, the 6th Viscount Midleton and 7th Viscount Midleton (the latter being also Dean of Exeter), while Mary married the Earl of Bandon and Albinia married James Ashley Maude.

== Sources ==
Nigel Yates, The Religious Condition of Ireland, 1770–1850 (Oxford University Press, 2006)

Church of Ireland titles
Preceded by Richard Marley	Bishop of Clonfert and Kilmacduagh; 1795–1796	Succeeded by Hugh Hamilton
Preceded by William Foster	Bishop of Kilmore; 1796–1801	Succeeded by George de la Poer Beresford
Preceded by Charles Agar	Archbishop of Cashel; 1801–1822	Succeeded by Richard Laurence
