= William Brodrick, 7th Viscount Midleton =

Irish peer and Anglican clergyman

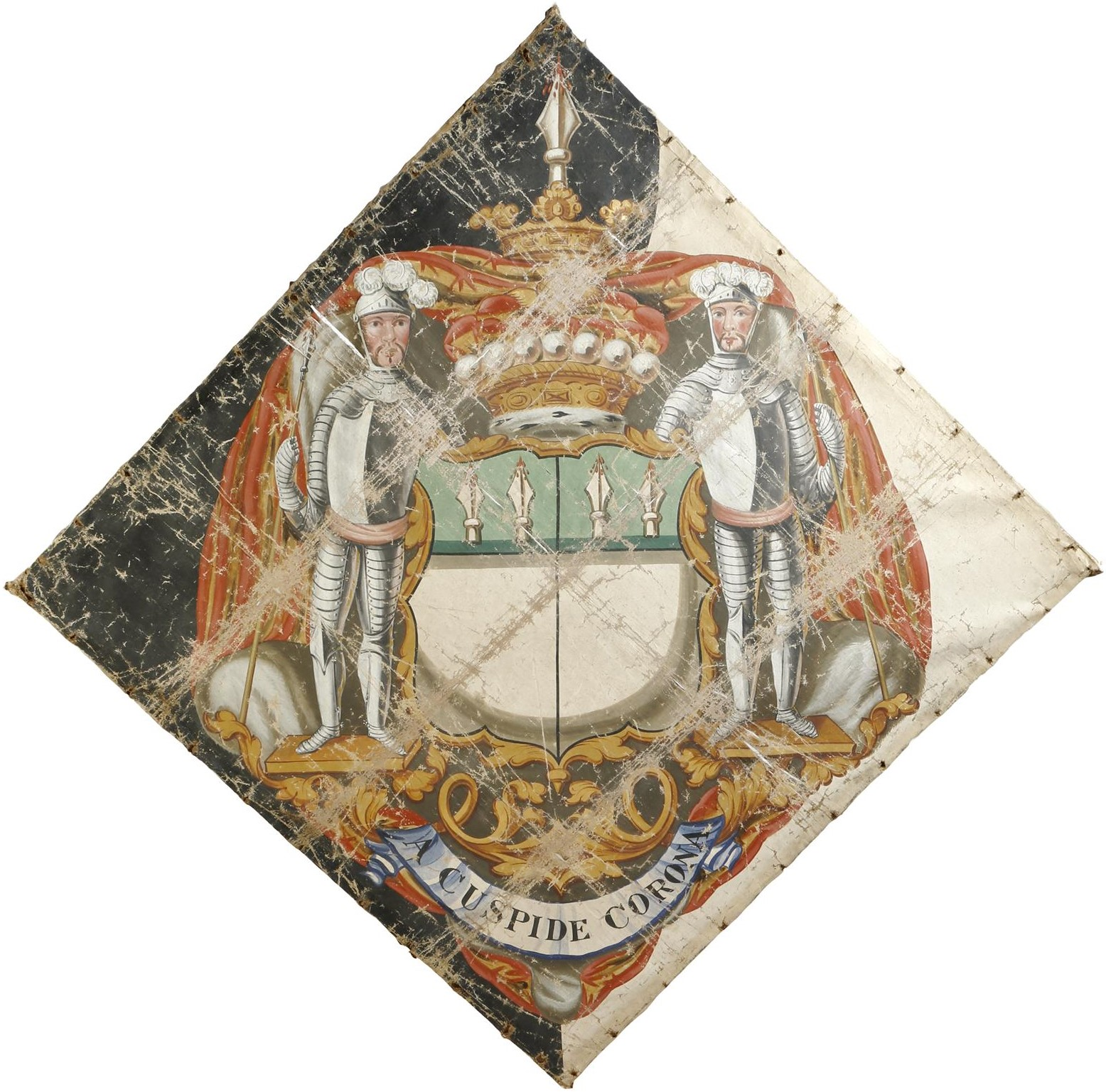
A funeral hatchment with the coat arms of William Brodrick, 7th Viscount Midleton, displaying his arms impaling the paternal arms of his second wife Harriet Brodrick, daughter of George Brodrick, 4th Viscount Midleton

William John Brodrick, 7th Viscount Midleton (8 July 1798 – 29 August 1870) was an Irish peer and Anglican clergyman, styled Hon. William John Brodrick from 1849 to 1863. Brodrick was the second son of Charles Brodrick, Archbishop of Cashel, and was educated at Balliol College, Oxford. Lord Midleton was the Dean of Exeter in the Church of England from 1863 to 1867 and an Honorary Chaplain to the Queen.

Just a few months before her death, William was married to his first wife Lady Elizabeth Anne Brudenell (6 Mar 1795 – 21 Nov 1824) on 16 March 1824, the daughter of the 6th Earl of Cardigan. He later married his cousin Harriet Brodrick (10 Aug 1804 – 13 Aug 1893) on 31 March 1829 with whom he had children.

Church of England titles
Preceded by Charles John Ellicott	Dean of Exeter; 1863–1867	Succeeded by Archibald Boyd
Peerage of Ireland
Preceded by Charles Brodrick	Viscount Midleton; 1863–1870	Succeeded by William Brodrick
