= Richard Baggallay =

British politician

The Right Honourable Sir Richard Baggallay
- Sir Richard Baggallay, 1876.

Attorney General for England and Wales
- In office 20 April 1874 – 25 November 1875
- Monarch: Victoria
- Prime Minister: Benjamin Disraeli
- Preceded by: Sir John Burgess Karslake
- Succeeded by: Sir John Holker

Lord Justice of Appeal
- In office 5 November 1875 – 28 November 1885

Personal details
- Pronunciation: /ˈbæɡəliˌ-ɡli/
- Born: 13 May 1816 Lambeth, Surrey, England (now London)
- Died: 13 November 1888 (aged 72) Hove, Sussex, England
- Resting place: West Norwood Cemetery
- Party: Conservative
- Spouse: Marianne Lacy
- Education: Gonville and Caius College, Cambridge
- Baptism: 15 June 1816; St-Mary-at-Lambeth

Sir Richard Baggallay PC (1816 – 1888) was a British barrister, politician, and judge. After serving as Attorney-General under Benjamin Disraeli from 1874 to 1875, Baggallay was appointed a Lord Justice of Appeal in Chancery (Lord Justice of Appeal from 1877), serving until his resignation in 1885.

== Background and education ==
Baggallay was one of the sons of Richard Baggallay, of Stockwell, a member of the Merchant Taylors' Company and a significant warehouseman of the City of London (d.1870, will sworn at under £30,000). He attended Gonville and Caius College, Cambridge where he graduated with a BA in 1839 followed by an MA in 1842. He was called to the Bar, Lincoln's Inn, in 1843.

== Political and legal career ==
Bagallay sat as a Conservative Party Member of Parliament (MP) for Hereford from 1865 to 1868. He was knighted on 14 December 1868 after losing his seat, but was re-elected in 1870 as MP for Mid Surrey, holding the seat until 1875. He served briefly as Solicitor-General under Benjamin Disraeli in 1868 and again in 1874, and as Attorney-General under Disraeli from 1874 to 1875. In 1875, he was sworn of the Privy Council and appointed to the newly established Court of Appeal, where he served until his resignation in 1885. He thereafter occasionally sat in the Privy Council until his death in 1888.

=== Judgments ===
- Parker v South Eastern Railway [1877] 2 CPD 416 - English contract law on exclusion clauses holding that an individual cannot escape a contractual term by failing to read the contract, but that a party wanting to rely on an exclusion clause must take reasonable steps to bring it to the attention of the customer.
- The Household Fire and Carriage Accident Insurance Company (Limited) v Grant (1878–79) 4 Ex D 216 - Contract law concerning the "postal rule", and containing an important dissent by Bramwell LJ, who wished to dispose of it.
- Tamplin v James (1880) 15 Ch D 215 (CA), upholding a decision of Baggallay in the first instance; contract law concerning the availability of specific performance for a breach of contract induced by mistake.
- Re Hallett's Estate (1880) 13 Ch D 696 - English trusts law concerning asset tracing, Baggallay LJ concurring with Fry LJ.
- Redgrave v Hurd (1881) 20 Ch D 1 - Contract law - misrepresentation, holding that a contract can be rescinded for innocent misrepresentation, even where the represent(ee) had the chance to verify the false statement; Baggallay concurring with Jessel MR.
- Hutton v West Cork Rly Co (1883) 23 Ch D 654 - UK company law case concerning the limits of a director's discretion to spend company funds for the (clear) benefit of non-shareholders without a shareholder vote; Baggallay dissenting from the decision of Cotton LJ and Bowen LJ.
- Smith v Land and House Property Corp (1884) 28 Ch D 7 - Contract law case - misrepresentation, holding that a statement of opinion can represent that one knows certain facts, and can amount to misrepresentation; Baggallay LJ concurring with Bowen LJ

== Personal life ==
He married, on 25 February 1847, Marianne, youngest daughter of Henry Charles Lacy of Withdean Hall, Sussex, by whom he left children.

In later years Baggallay suffered from poor health and died while convalescing at 10 Brunswick Square, Hove, Sussex. He was buried at South Metropolitan Cemetery at Norwood.

== Legacy ==
Aside from certain of his judicial co-decisions and occasional dissents which proved to be of long importance - decisions of the Court of Appeal have binding authority unless and until reshaped at that level, above or by statute - his probate was re-sworn in 1890 leaving assets of £65,491 (equivalent to about £7,300,000 in 2025). He left executors as his widow at 55 Queens Gate, South Kensington and three sons, who lived at their houses in Elm Park Road, Chelsea and Onslow Square.

== Arms ==
Coat of arms of Richard Baggallay
| Crest A goat’s head erased Argent charged on the neck with three fleur-de-lis Azure. Escutcheon Per chevron Gules and Azure on a chevron Or between three goats’ heads erased Argent as many fleur-de-lis Azure. Motto Stemmata Quid Faciunt |

== Sources ==
- Obituary, The Times, 14 November 1888

Parliament of the United Kingdom
| Preceded by Henry Morgan-Clifford; George Clive | Member of Parliament for Hereford; 1865 – 1868; With: George Clive | Succeeded by John Wyllie; George Clive |
| Preceded by William Brodrick; Sir Henry Peek, Bt | Member of Parliament for Mid Surrey; 1870–1875; With: Sir Henry Peek, Bt | Succeeded by Sir Trevor Lawrence, Bt; Sir Henry Peek, Bt |
Legal offices
| Preceded by Sir William Baliol Brett | Solicitor General for England and Wales; September–December 1868 | Succeeded by Sir John Coleridge |
| Preceded by Sir William Vernon Harcourt | Solicitor General for England and Wales; 1874 | Succeeded by Sir John Holker |
| Preceded by Sir John Burgess Karslake | Attorney General for England and Wales; 1874–1875 | Succeeded by Sir John Holker |
