= Peper Harow =

Village and parish in Surrey, England

Coordinates: 51.191750°N 0.666885°W

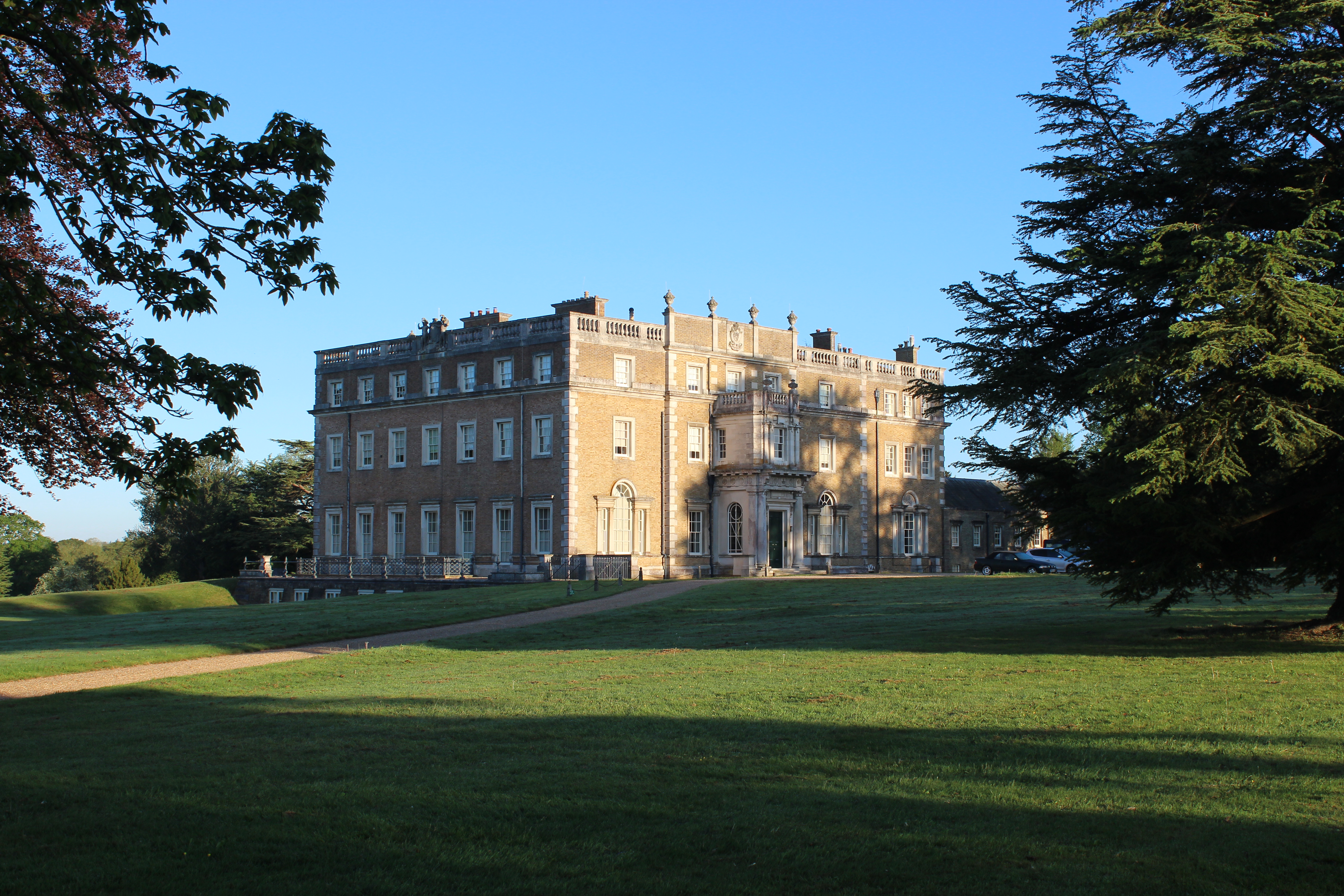
- Peper Harow House

- Location within Surrey
- Area: 5.34 km^{2} (2.06 sq mi)
- Population: 185 (Civil Parish 2011)
  - Density: 35/km^{2} (91/sq mi)
- OS grid reference: SU932444
- Civil parish: Peper Harow
- District: Waverley
- Shire county: Surrey
- Region: South East
- Country: England
- Sovereign state: United Kingdom
- Post town: Godalming
- Postcode district: GU8
- Dialling code: 01483
- Police: Surrey
- Fire: Surrey
- Ambulance: South East Coast
- UK Parliament: Godalming and Ash

Peper Harow is a rural village and civil parish in southwest Surrey close to the town of Godalming. It was a noted early cricket venue. Its easternmost fields are in part given up to the A3 trunk road.

== Location and history ==
The name "Peper Harow" is unusual and comes from Old English Pipers Hear(g) perhaps meaning, approximately "The pagan stone altar of the pipers"; however, hearg can also be haeg meaning more prosaically hedged enclosure (of the pipers), or even hay meadow. Pipers might mean musicians, or sandpipers (the green sandpiper and wood sandpiper are migrants to marsh and swampy ground – as this is).

There is also a possibility that the name Peper Harow is derived from the Saxon piþa har hleow, meaning the old pith refuge pith being used for making tallow lights. The Burghal Hideage records 'Eashing' as one of the forts, however the forts are not necessarily in the locations recorded or the locations have moved. The most likely location for this fort is at Warren Hill in the parish of Peper Harow, and its size fits the expected size of this fort.

Peper Harow appears in the Domesday Book of 1086 as Pipereherge. It was held by Girard (Gerard) from Walter, son of Othere. Its domesday assets were: 3 hides. It had 3 ploughs, 1 mill worth 15s, 7 acres (2.8 ha) of meadow. It rendered £5 per year to its feudal overlords. Later documented forms are: Pipereherge (11th century); Piperinges (13th century); Pyperhaghe (14th century).

In the graveyard of St. Nicholas's Church (dating to 1301) is an ancient yew tree which has been dated to being 800 years old which could stand on the site of an old pagan site. Close to Peper Harow at Bonville Hanger Wood is a Holy well called Bonfield Spring that is also thought to have held pre-Christian religious significance.

Descent of the manor

Denzil Holles (who had no issue) died in 1694, and the manor reverted to John, Duke of Newcastle, his male heir who sold it in February 1699 – 1700 to Philip Frowde, who in 1713 sold it to Alan Brodrick, who was elevated to the Viscountcy of Midleton.

In 1725, this Viscount Midleton was 'expected to reside [in the manor] shortly, and was patron (sponsor) of the church, whose son died 1747. In the son's time his first cousin Vice-Admiral Thomas Brodrick also lived at the estate. George Brodrick, the third viscount died holding it in 1765. He was succeeded by his son George, created Baron Brodrick of Peper Harow in the Peerage of the United Kingdom, who died 1836. His son George Alan was succeeded in 1848 by his cousin Charles, grandson of the third viscount, who died in 1863. The manor passed to his brother, the Very Rev. W J Brodrick, who dying in 1870 was succeeded by his son William, appointed (for the year term) Lord Lieutenant of Surrey. This Viscount Midleton died in 1907, and was succeeded by his eldest son. George Broderick, (who married Rene Ray), was the eldest son of five children born to St John Brodrick, 1st Earl of Midleton by his first wife, Lady Hilda Charteris.

21st-century history

St. Nicholas's church was almost destroyed by fire in December 2007. The yew was unharmed and the church has been restored. Parts of the village are privately owned with restricted access.

== Cricket ==
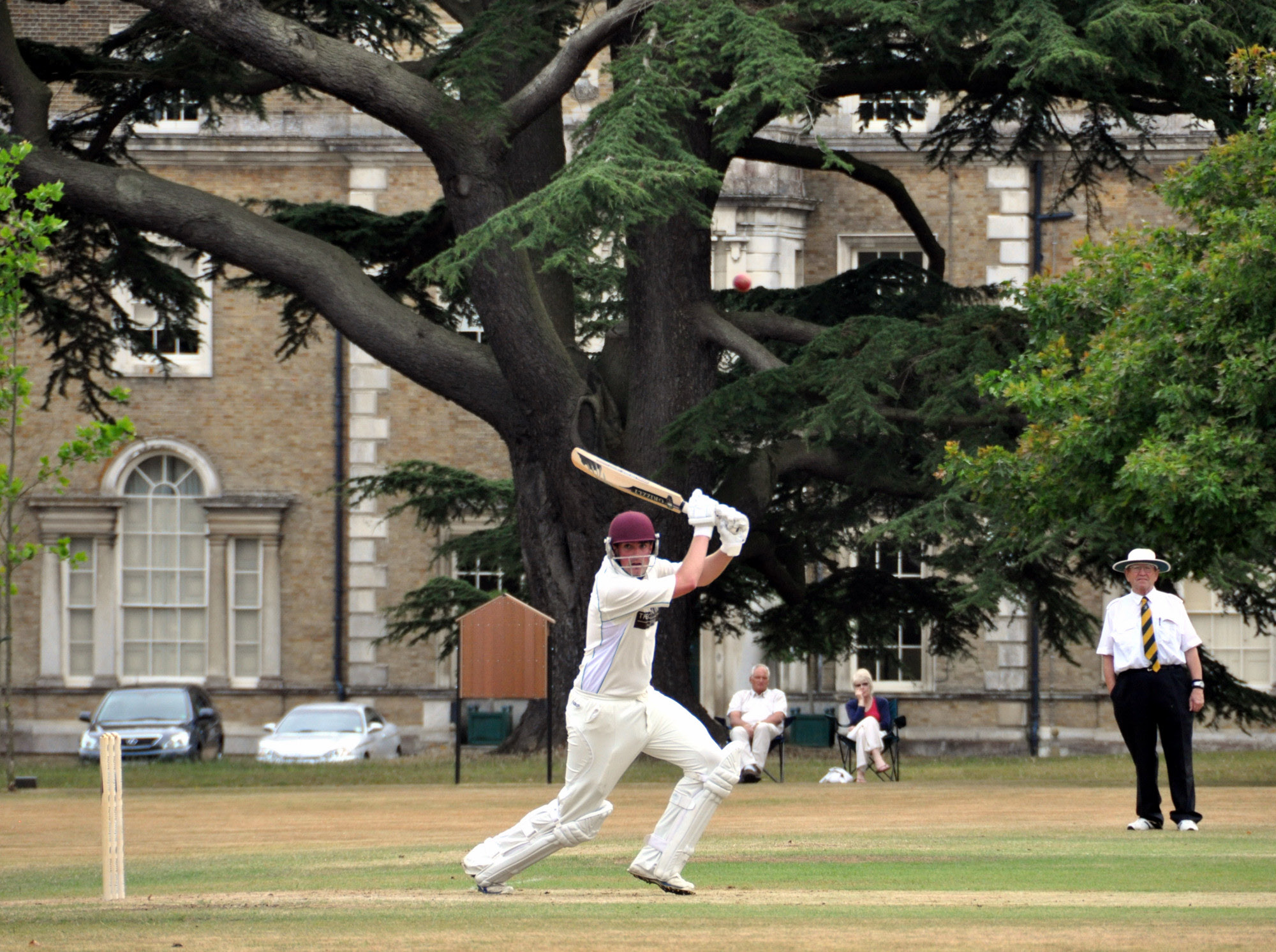
Playing cricket at Peper Harow

Cricket has long been played here, with evidence of rules and matches dating to 1727. Alan Brodrick, 2nd Viscount Midleton was a cricket patron and one match against a team organised by Charles Lennox, 2nd Duke of Richmond is believed to have taken place at Peper Harow in the 1727 English cricket season.

== Other activities ==
During the Second World War, Peper Harow was used as a holding area for Canadian Forces. Part of the park not in the parish is used annually for point-to-point horse racing.

== Peper Harow House ==
Peper Harow House was built by Sir William Chambers for George Brodrick, 3rd Viscount Midleton in 1765. Still incomplete when the 3rd Viscount died (in 1765), it was completed by his son after he came of age. It is a Grade I listed building. Lancelot 'Capability' Brown landscaped the park in 1762–3, and many fine trees remain from this time. Particularly notable are the Lebanon Cedar. According to 'A History of the County of Surrey' published in 1911, the park and grounds at Peper Harow contained some fine timber at that time, notably the cedars of Lebanon, which were put in as seedlings from pots in 1735.

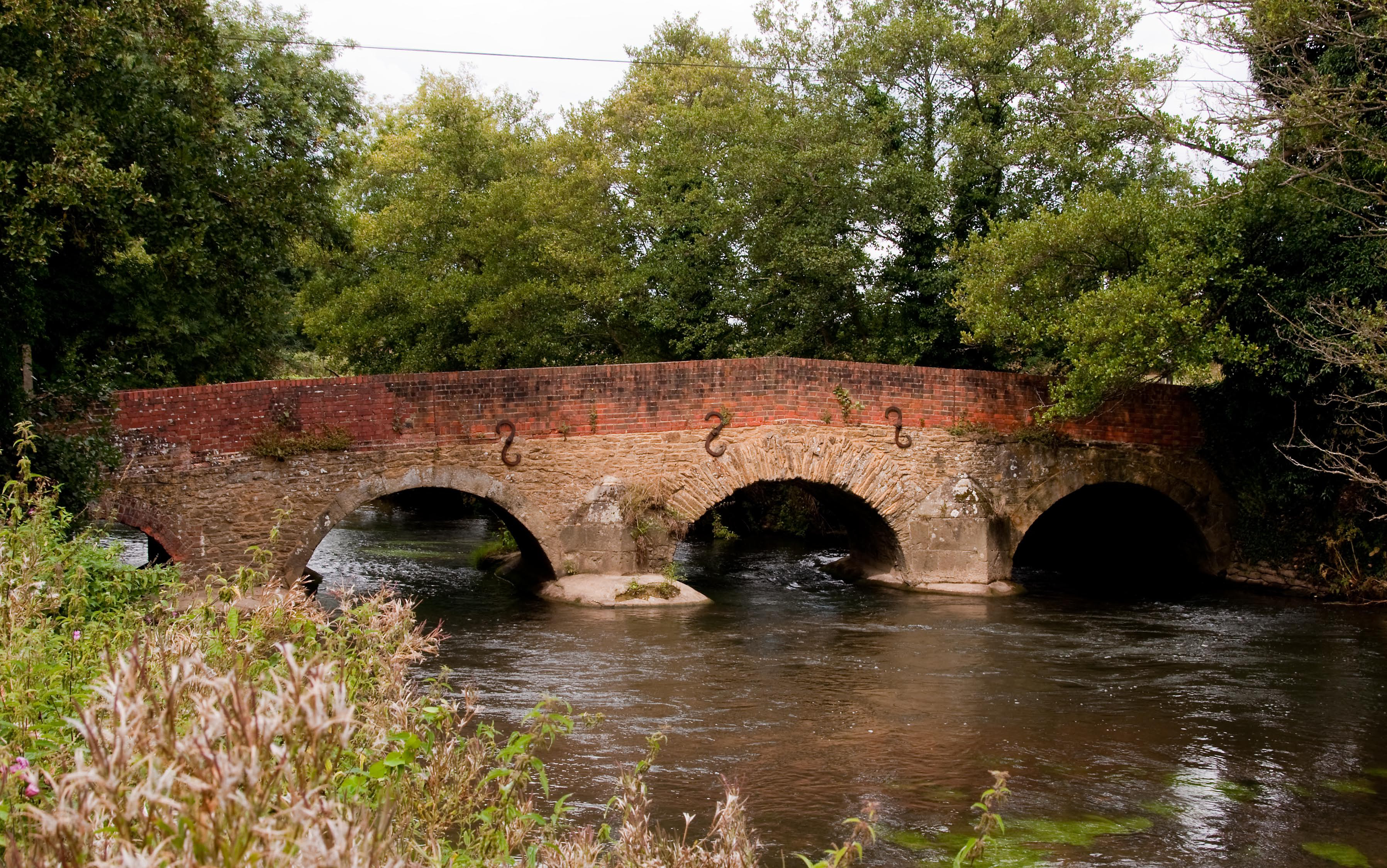
Somerset Bridge

The ancient Somerset Bridge crosses the River Wey and connects Peper Harow with nearby Elstead.

The house was owned by the Midleton family until 1944 when it was sold to property developers. It, and the entire village, is now owned by a trust.

== Demography and housing ==
2011 Census Homes
| Output area | Detached | Semi-detached | Terraced | Flats and apartments | Caravans/temporary/mobile homes | shared between households |
|---|---|---|---|---|---|---|
| (Civil Parish) | 31 | 24 | 8 | 4 | 0 | 0 |

The average level of accommodation in the region composed of detached houses was 28%, the average that was apartments was 22.6%.

2011 Census Key Statistics
| Output area | Population | Households | % Owned outright | % Owned with a loan | hectares |
|---|---|---|---|---|---|
| (Civil Parish) | 185 | 67 | 43.3% | 37.3% | 534 |

The proportion of households in the civil parish who owned their home outright compares to the regional average of 35.1%. The proportion who owned their home with a loan compares to the regional average of 32.5%. The remaining % is made up of rented dwellings (plus a negligible % of households living rent-free).

== Bibliography ==
- Birley, Derek (1999). A Social History of English Cricket. Aurum.
- McCann, Tim (2004). Sussex Cricket in the Eighteenth Century. Sussex Record Society.
- Marshall, John (1961). The Duke who was Cricket. Muller.
