= John Townshend, 2nd Viscount Sydney =

British peer and Member of Parliament

The Right Honourable The Viscount Sydney of St Leonards

Member of Parliament for Whitchurch
- In office 1790–1800 Serving with The Viscount Midleton; William Brodrick
- Preceded by: William Selwyn
- Succeeded by: William Townshend

Member of Parliament for Newport, Isle of Wight
- In office 1786–1790 Serving with Edward Rushworth
- Preceded by: Lord Hugh Seymour
- Succeeded by: George Byng

Personal details
- Born: 21 February 1764
- Died: 20 January 1831 (aged 66)
- Spouses: Hon. Sophia Southwell (m. 1790; died 1795) Lady Caroline Clements (m. 1802; died 1805)
- Children: 3, including Mary and John
- Parent(s): Thomas Townshend, 1st Viscount Sydney; Elizabeth Powys
- Education: Eton School; Clare College, Cambridge

John Thomas Townshend, 2nd Viscount Sydney of St Leonards (21 February 1764 – 20 January 1831) was a British peer and Member of Parliament.

== Early life ==
Townshend was born on 21 February 1764. He was the eldest son of twelve children born to Thomas Townshend, 1st Viscount Sydney of St Leonards and the former Elizabeth Powys (1736–1826). His mother was a Lady of the Bedchamber to Queen Charlotte. Two of his brothers were also Members of Parliament, the Hon. Horatio George Powys Townshend and the Hon. William Augustus Townshend. Among his siblings were Hon Mary Elizabeth Townshend, who married John Pitt, 2nd Earl of Chatham; Hon. Frances Townshend, who married George Rice, 3rd Baron Dynevor; Hon Harriet Katherine Townshend, who married their second cousin Charles Montagu-Scott, 4th Duke of Buccleuch.

His paternal grandparents were Hon. Thomas Townshend MP (the second son of Charles Townshend, 2nd Viscount Townshend and Hon. Elizabeth Pelham, the only surviving daughter and heiress of Thomas Pelham, 1st Baron Pelham) and the former Albinia Selwyn (daughter and heiress of Col. John Selwyn MP). His maternal grandparents were Richard Powys MP, of Hintlesham Hall, and the former Lady Mary Brudenell (the second daughter of George Brudenell, 3rd Earl of Cardigan).

From 1775 to 1781, he was educated at Eton School, followed by Clare College, Cambridge. He went on the Grand Tour in 1785.

== Career ==
In 1786, he was elected to the Parliament of the United Kingdom as the Hon. John Townshend for Newport, Isle of Wight, sitting from 1786 to 1790. He then sat for Whitchurch from 1790 to 1800, where he was listed among opponents of repeal of the Test Act in Scotland in 1791. Townshend supported Pitt's administration, voting for his assessed taxes on 4 January 1798, and acting as ministerial teller on 20 June 1798. During his tenure, "he is not known to have uttered a syllable in the House." From 1784 to 1789, he served as the Under-Secretary of State for Home Affairs followed by a Lord of the Admiralty from 1789 to 1793. From 1793 to 1800, he was a Lord of the Treasury.

Upon the death of his father in 1800, he inherited his peerage and became a courtier. From 1800 to 1810, he was a Lord of the Bedchamber to George III, while also serving as a Ranger of Hyde Park and Ranger of St James's Park from 1807 to his death.

== Personal life ==
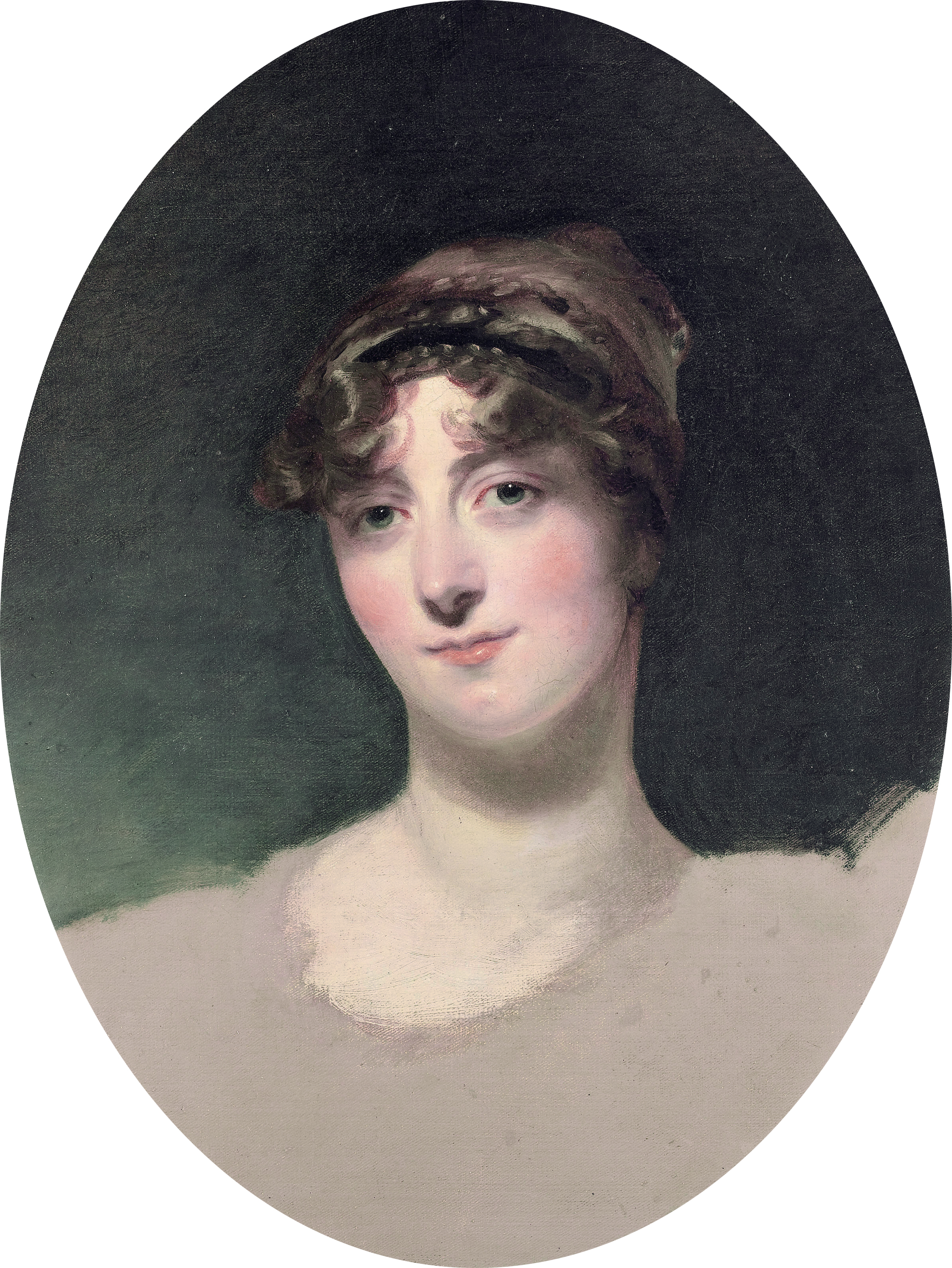
Lady Caroline, Viscountess Sydney, by Thomas Lawrence.

He was twice married and both of his wives died in childbirth. His first marriage took place on 13 April 1790 to the Hon. Sophia Southwell, daughter of Sophia (née Campbell) Southwell and Edward Southwell, 20th Baron de Clifford. Before her death on 9 November 1795, they were the parents of two children together:

- Hon. Sophia Mary Townshend (d. 1852), who married John Russell, third son of Lord William Russell (himself the third son of Francis Russell, Marquess of Tavistock), and was the mother of Edward Russell, 23rd Baron de Clifford, a Member of Parliament for Tavistock.
- Mary Elizabeth Sydney (1794–1847), who married George James Cholmondeley (1752–1830), the son of Mary Woffington. After his death, she married Charles Marsham, 2nd Earl of Romney.

He married a second time, to Lady Caroline Elizabeth Letitia Clements on 27 Mat 1802. Lady Caroline was the third daughter of Robert Clements, 1st Earl of Leitrim and the former Lady Elizabeth Skeffington (the eldest daughter, by his second wife, of Clotworthy Skeffington, 1st Earl of Massereene). Before her death on 9 August 1805, they were the parents of one child together:

- John Robert Townshend, 1st Earl Sydney (1805–1890), who married Lady Emily Paget (1810–1893), eldest daughter of Henry Paget, 1st Marquess of Anglesey.

Sydney died on 20 January 1831. His death was viewed by the family "as a great release from hopeless suffering". His titles and estate was inherited by his only son, John, who was created the first Earl Sydney, of Scadbury in the County of Kent on 27 February 1874. As John and his wife had no children, the Earldom, Viscountcy and Barony of Sydney became extinct on his death on 14 February 1890.

Parliament of Great Britain
Preceded by William Selwyn	Member of Parliament for Whitchurch; 1790–1800; With: The Viscount Midleton; William Brodrick	Succeeded by William Townshend
Preceded by Lord Hugh Seymour	Member of Parliament for Newport, Isle of Wight; 1786–1790; With: Edward Rushworth	Succeeded by George Byng
Peerage of Great Britain
Preceded by Thomas Townshend	Viscount Sydney; 1800–1831	Succeeded by John Robert Townshend
