= George Brodrick, 4th Viscount Midleton =

British politician

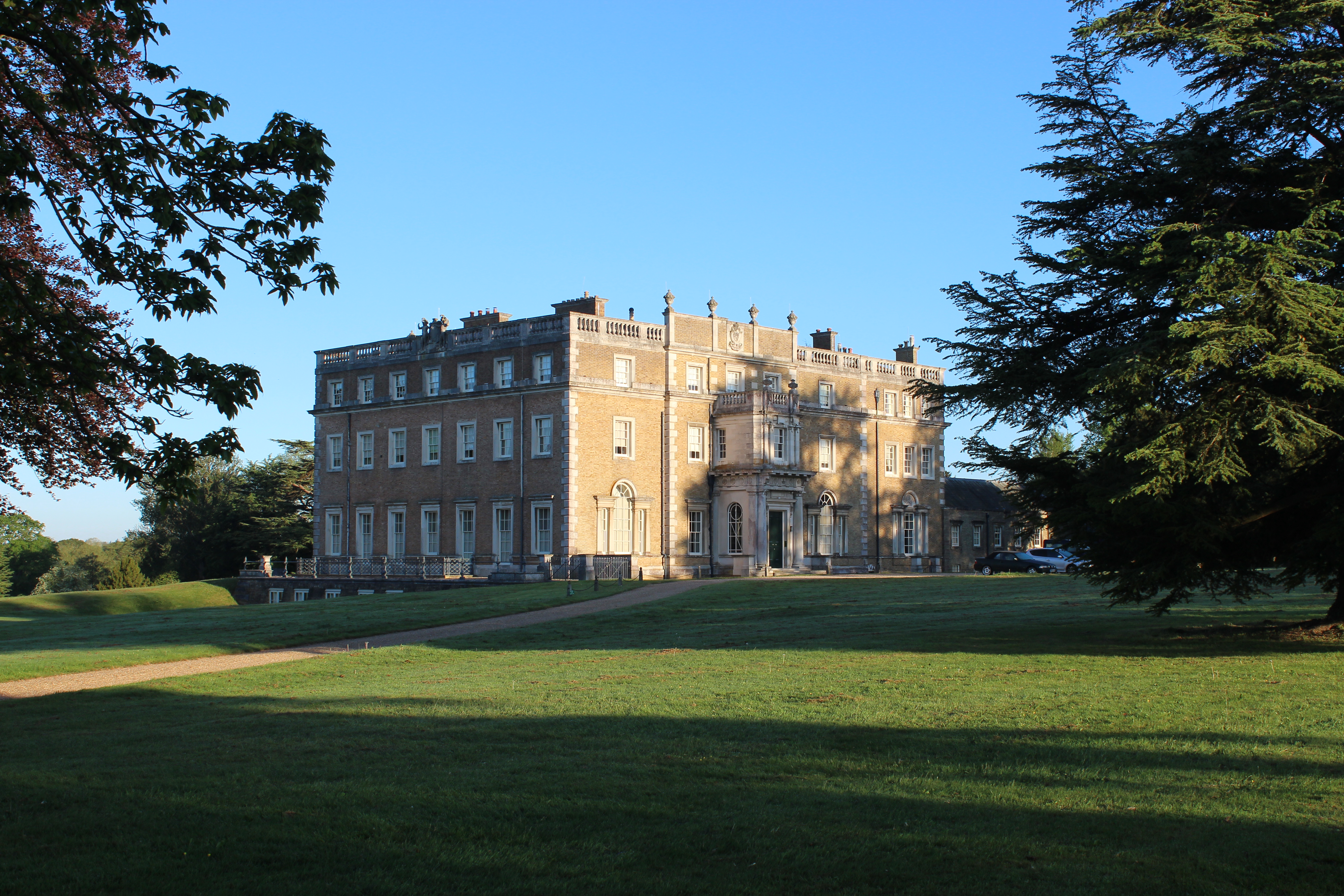
Peper Harow House

George Brodrick, 4th Viscount Midleton (1 November 1754 – 12 August 1836) was an Anglo-Irish politician who sat in the House of Commons from 1774 to 1796, when he was raised to the peerage of Great Britain as Baron Brodrick to allow him to sit in the House of Lords.

== Origins ==
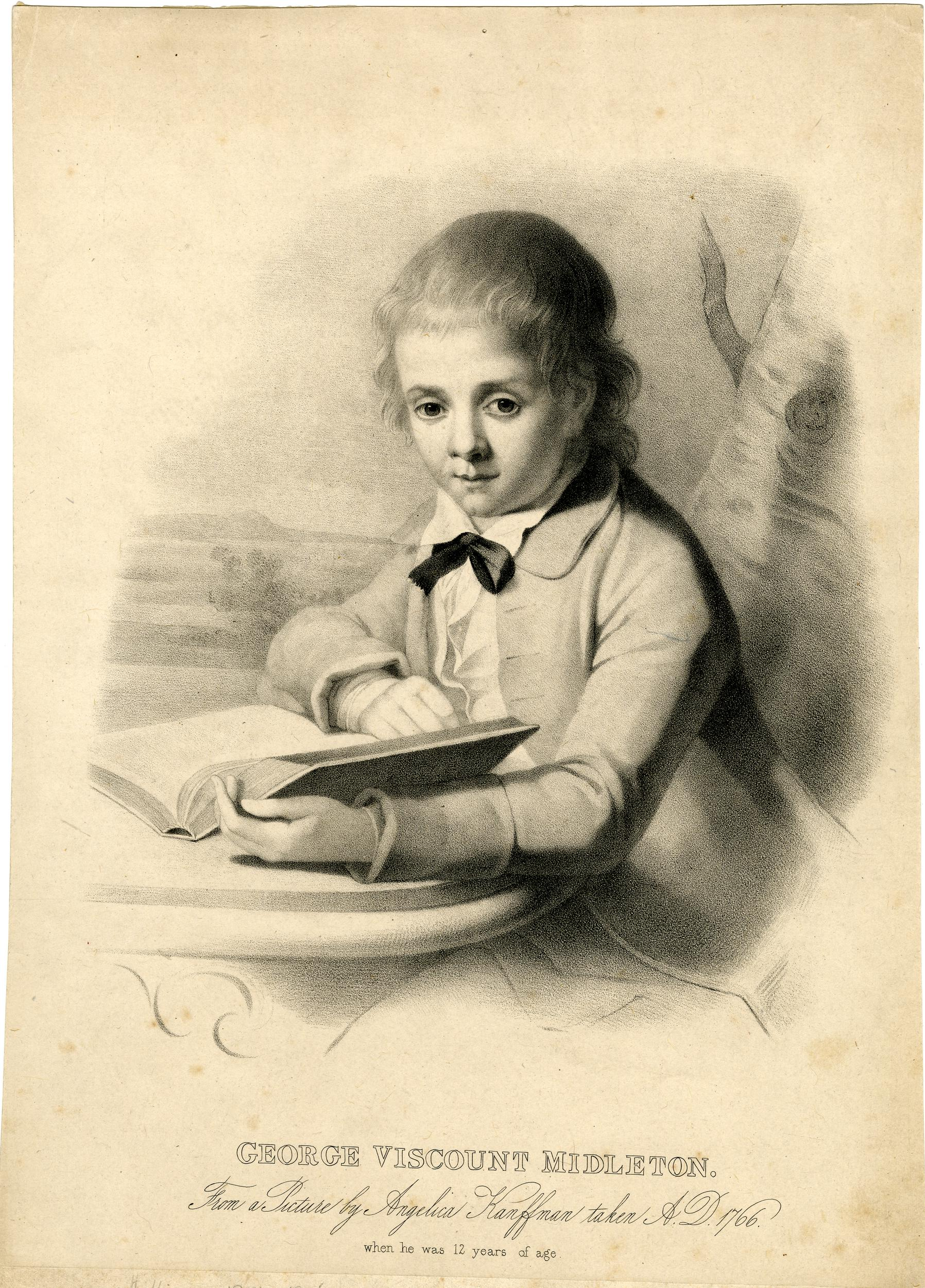
Portrait, aged 12

Brodrick was the eldest son and heir of George Brodrick, 3rd Viscount Midleton (died 22 August 1765) and Albinia, the daughter of the Hon Thomas Townshend. The Brodricks were an English family that had settled in Ireland in the mid-17th century. He was educated at Eton College from 1766 to 1771, and was admitted to St. John's College, Cambridge in 1772.

He succeeded his father in 1765, inheriting his Irish Viscouncy and the Peper Harow estate in Surrey with its new but incomplete mansion, which he completed once he came of age. It is now a Grade I listed building.

== Career ==
From 1774 to 1796 Midleton was able as an Irish peer to sit as one of the two MPs for Whitchurch, the seat being in the gift of his mother's brother, Thomas Townshend, 1st Viscount Sydney.

On 11 June 1796, Midleton was created Baron Brodrick of Peper Harrow, in the county of Surrey.

Midleton died at Peper Harrow (his principal ancestral estate in England) on 12 August 1836, and was buried at Wandsworth.

== Family ==
Midleton married first (4 December 1778) Frances Pelham, the second daughter of Thomas Pelham, 1st Earl of Chichester by Anne, daughter of Frederick Meinhardt Frankland. By her, who died on 28 June 1783, he had a daughter:

- Hon. Frances Anne Brodick (died 19 February 1828), who married Inigo Thomas (formerly Inigo Freeman), grandson of Sir George Thomas, 1st Baronet, on 24 August 1803, and had nine children

Midleton married secondly (13 June 1797) Maria Benyon, second daughter of Richard Benyon MP and his wife Hannah Hulse daughter of Sir Edward Hulse of Breamore House, Hampshire. Maria survived him, dying on 22 January 1852. They had six children:

- Hon. Maria Brodrick (28 March 1799 – 11 April 1893), died unmarried
- Hon. Charlotte Brodrick (18 February 1801 – 12 April 1863), died unmarried
- Hon. Harriet Brodrick (10 August 1804 – 13 August 1893) who married her cousin, Very Rev. William John Brodrick, 7th Viscount Midleton
- George Alan Brodrick, 5th Viscount Midleton (10 June 1806 – 1 November 1848)
- Hon. Emma Brodrick (13 August 1807 – 5 April 1894), died unmarried
- Hon. Lucy Brodrick (3 July 1809 – 31 December 1895), died unmarried

Parliament of Great Britain
Preceded by Hon. Henry Wallop; Thomas Townshend	Member of Parliament for Whitchurch; 1774–1796; With: Thomas Townshend 1774–1783; William Selwyn 1783–1790; Hon. John Townshend 1790–1796	Succeeded by Hon. William Brodrick; Hon. William Townshend
Honorary titles
Preceded by The Earl of Onslow	Lord Lieutenant of Surrey; 1814–1830	Succeeded by The Lord Arden
Peerage of Ireland
Preceded by George Brodrick	Viscount Midleton; 1765–1836	Succeeded by George Alan Brodrick
Peerage of Great Britain
New creation	Baron Brodrick; 1796–1836	Succeeded by George Alan Brodrick
