= Mary Pitt, Countess of Chatham =

Mary Elizabeth Pitt, Countess of Chatham (2 September 1762 – 21 May 1821), formerly Mary Elizabeth Townshend, was an English noblewoman and political campaigner. Her husband was John Pitt, 2nd Earl of Chatham.

Mary was the daughter of Thomas Townshend, 1st Viscount Sydney, and his wife, the former Elizabeth Powys. Her younger sister Frances (1772–1854) married George Rice, 3rd Baron Dynevor. Another sister, Harriet (1773–1814), married Charles Montagu-Scott, 4th Duke of Buccleuch.

She married the earl on 9 July 1783, at St George's, Hanover Square. Her brother-in-law, William Pitt the Younger, became prime minister later the same year, and Mary's father, a political ally, became Home Secretary in 1784. In 1799 her husband, the earl, became First Lord of the Admiralty. In 1800, the countess's eldest brother, John, an MP since 1786, inherited the viscountcy on their father's death.

Although by nature shy, and often in poor health, the countess was obliged to campaign on behalf of her husband and father and the Pitt government. Soon after her marriage, she had begun suffering from rheumatism, which confined her to bed for a long period and later often forced her to use a wheelchair. After the death of her brother-in-law in 1806, she began suffering bouts of mental illness, which frequently incapacitated her. In October 1807, she made a suicide attempt, which resulted in her being kept out of the public eye for several years, and she never fully returned to public life.

She died, possibly of liver failure, at the couple's London home in Hill Street, Mayfair. She was buried in the Pitt family vault in Westminster Abbey. Her marriage was childless and the earldom became extinct on her husband's death in 1835.
