= Britford =

Village in Wiltshire, England

Coordinates: 51.053°N 1.773°W

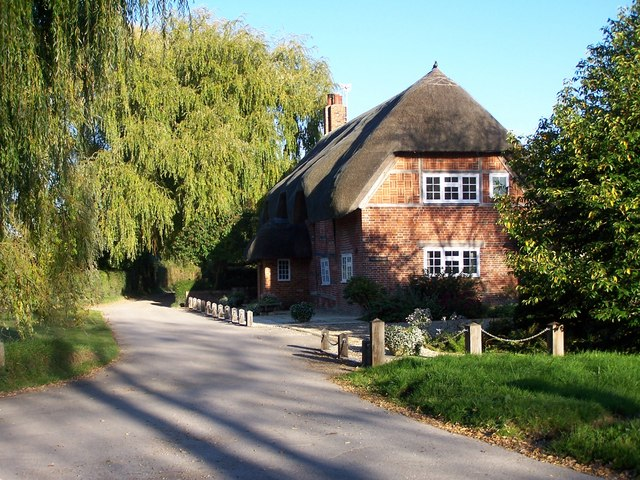
- The Old Bakery, Britford

- Location within Wiltshire
- Population: 592 (2011 Census)
- OS grid reference: SU160282
- Civil parish: Britford
- Unitary authority: Wiltshire
- Ceremonial county: Wiltshire
- Region: South West
- Country: England
- Sovereign state: United Kingdom
- Post town: Salisbury
- Postcode district: SP5
- Dialling code: 01722
- Police: Wiltshire
- Fire: Dorset and Wiltshire
- Ambulance: South Western
- UK Parliament: Salisbury
- Website: Parish Council

Britford is a village and civil parish beside the River Avon about 1.5 miles (2.4 km) south-east of Salisbury in Wiltshire, England. The village is just off the A338 Salisbury-Bournemouth road. The 2011 Census recorded a parish population of 592.

== Geography ==
Britford village lies towards the east of the parish, about 1.3 miles (2.1 km) south-east of Salisbury Cathedral. East of the village are water meadows created by the Avon. The parish extends some 3 miles (4.8 km) westward across agricultural land, with no named settlements; in this area, about 1 mile south-west of the village, a hospital begun in the Second World War has expanded into the large Salisbury District Hospital which serves a wide area.

== Archaeology ==
Little Woodbury, 0.5 miles (800 m) south-west of the village, is the site of an Iron Age settlement. Excavations in 1938–39 revealed the sites of granaries, storage pits and a circular house nearly 50 feet (15 m) in diameter.

Great Woodbury, 1 mile (1.6 km) from the village, is the remains of an Iron Age hill fort.

== History ==
The place-name 'Britford' is first attested in a Saxon charter of circa 670, where it appears as Brytfordingea. It appears as Bretford and Bredford in the Domesday Book of 1086, and as Brideford in the Curia Regis Rolls of 1203. The name means "brides' ford", and has the same etymology as Bridford in Devon.

Domesday Book recorded 48 households, two mills and a church. In the second quarter of the 13th century, Britford had an anchoress called Joan. In 1215 King John granted her an income of one penny per day. She received royal gifts of oaks in 1226, 1231 and 1245. In 1237 the sheriff of Salisbury was ordered to ensure that the courtyard around her house was securely enclosed with a wall.

The manor of Britford, together with that of Bramshaw nearby in Hampshire, appears to have been granted by one of the Norman kings to the de Lacy family sometime during the 12th century. Bramshaw church belonged to Britford from an early date until 1158. By the 16th century the manor was owned by George Hastings, 1st Earl of Huntingdon, whose wife was Anne Stafford, daughter of Henry Stafford, 2nd Duke of Buckingham.

In 1538 the earl sold the manor to a London mercer named Jervoise or Jervys. Descendants include Thomas Jervoise (died 1654), MP for Whitchurch, Hampshire. He was married at age 14 to Lucy Powlet, daughter of Sir Richard Powlet of Herriard and Freefolk, Hampshire, and after her sister died he added the Herriard estate to his family's substantial landholdings in Wiltshire, Worcestershire and Shropshire. Thomas's sons Richard (born 1615) and Thomas (died 1693), and grandson Thomas (1667–1743) were also MPs.

Moat House, south-west of St Peter's, was owned by the Jervoise family from 1542; the present 17th-century house is surrounded by a moat. The house was remodelled in 1766 and again in the 19th century, so that externally it looks early 19th century Georgian. It is now divided into two houses. Another addition in the 1760s was a pigeon house or dovecote in the garden, its ogee-headed windows matching those added to the house.

Rectory Farmhouse, north-west of St Peter's, is a 17th-century house with a symmetrical front of three bays. At the front the two ground-floor windows have four lights and a transom; the first floor windows have ovolo-moulded mullions. It is a Grade II* listed building.

There are Georgian cottages on the main A338 road, built for the Longford Castle estate.

=== Avon navigation ===
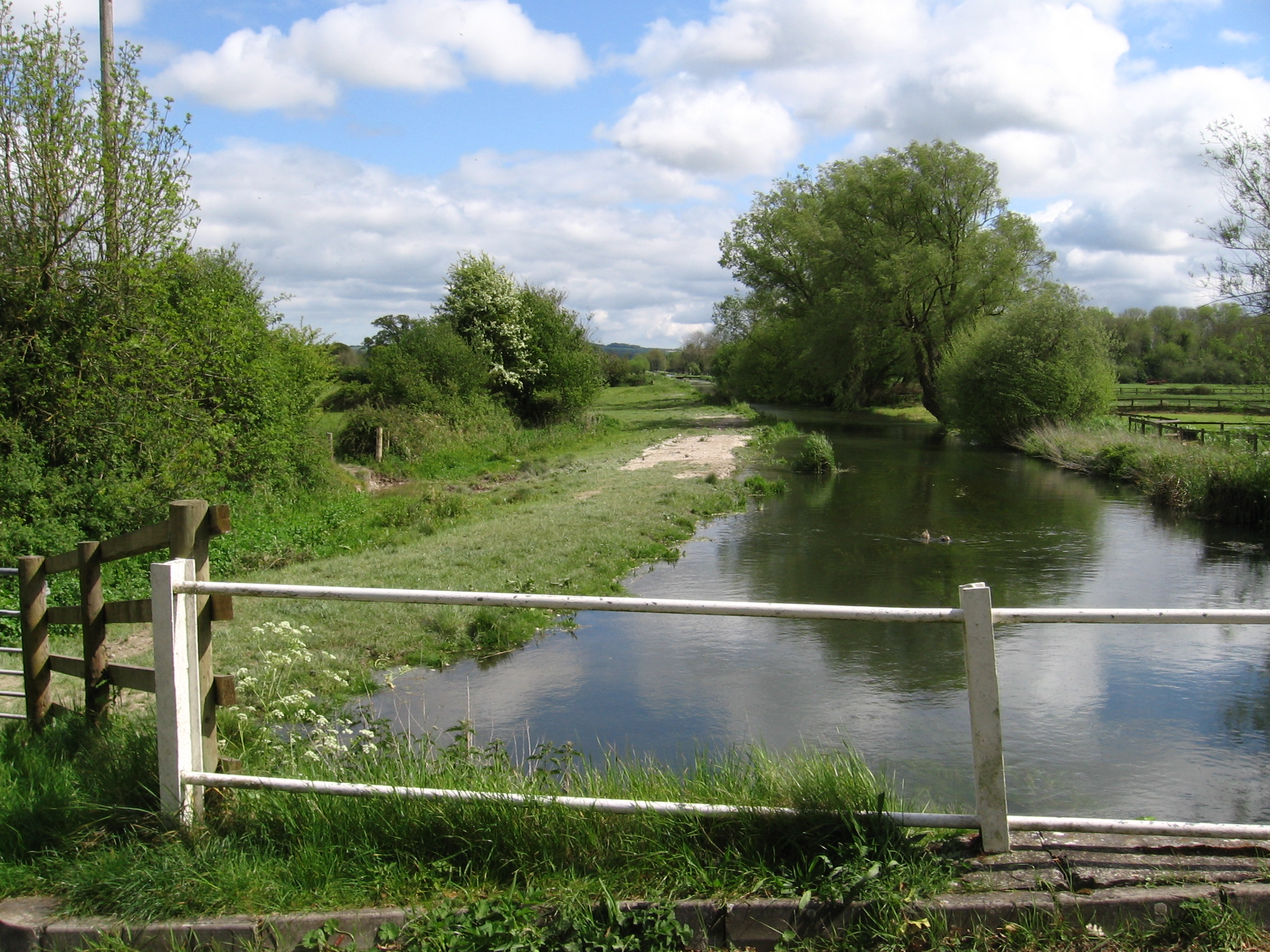
The 17th-century navigation channel on the edge of the water meadows near Britford

In 1664 an Act of Parliament authorised the conversion of the River Avon into a navigation between Salisbury and the English Channel at Christchurch. Canalised channels were dug to straighten sections of the river, including one about a 1 mile (1.6 km) long through Britford parish, leaving the watermeadows just downstream from the cathedral and rejoining the river near Longford Castle, south-east of the village. Work began in 1675 and the route was completed in 1684, but it fell out of use around 1715. The only surviving lock on the defunct waterway is near Longford Castle, and was rebuilt in brick as a pound lock soon after the original flash lock was damaged by flooding c.1700. Nearby is a footbridge over the navigation, built c.1748 after the abandonment.

=== East Harnham ===
East Harnham, upstream of Britford, was a tithing of Britford parish until All Saints' church was built there in 1854, and a district chapelry created for it the next year. East Harnham remained within Britford civil parish until 1896 when it was made a separate civil parish, which was abolished in 1904 in an expansion of Salisbury parish; at the same time some of its area was transferred to Britford. Further expansion of the city boundary in 1954 took from Britford the built-up areas north and south of the river, including the Petersfinger area on the Southampton road.

== Parish church ==
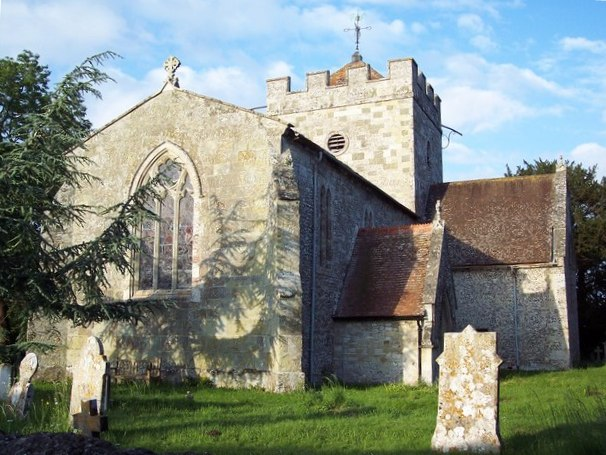
St Peter's Church

The Church of England parish church of Saint Peter stands near the riverbank, with Rectory Farm alongside, north-west of the present village. The tall nave survives from a substantial Saxon church of the 8th or 9th century, although it has been rebuilt except for the lower parts of the north and south walls.

On each side of the nave there is a round-headed Saxon arch into a porticus (small space for a side-chapel). The arch to the south porticus is plain, but that to the north porticus is supported by decorated stone slabs. The carving on one slab seems to be developed from the style of decoration of the Bewcastle and Ruthwell crosses at the beginning of the 8th century; the style of the other seems to be 9th century. Both arches contain re-used Roman brick. Julian Orbach, extending Nikolaus Pevsner's description of the church, calls the arches the "sensation of the interior" and notes Rosemary Cramp's suggestion that there was a royal tomb here. The arches were walled up, although visible from outside, until they were uncovered by Street in the 1870s.

In the 14th century the chancel and north and south transepts were added, making the church the cruciform building it is today. Each transept is next to the Saxon porticus on its corresponding side and includes the east wall of that porticus. The arches where the transepts meet the nave are Decorated Gothic, as is the east window of the chancel. A tomb-chest in the chancel, under a 14th-century arch, is supposed to be that of Henry Stafford, 2nd Duke of Buckingham who was executed in Salisbury in 1483. Also 15th-century is a small, iron-bound wooden chest in the north transept. Other memorials include a marble book listing the descent of the Jervoise family (by John Bacon the Younger, 1820) and in the mausoleum a bronze heraldic achievement for the 5th Earl of Radnor (died 1900). The finely carved pulpit is late 17th century although its stone base is Victorian.

The west wall of the nave was rebuilt in 1764. Over the crossing is a central tower, which was refaced or rebuilt in 1764 or 1767. John Robartes of Longford Castle, later 1st Earl of Radnor, paid for the 1764 work and had a family mausoleum added to the north-west corner of the north transept in 1764 or 1777. Box pews in the south transept are from the same century. The building was restored in 1872–3 to the designs of George Edmund Street: the work included changes to the windows and moving the entrance from the west end to the re-opened Saxon south doorway. He had the Radnor mausoleum Gothicised, reduced in height, and shortened to make room for a north-east vestry. Street also designed the Chilmark stone font. The renovation of 1873 was overseen by the Rev. Arthur Phillip Morres. The west window of the nave has stained glass made by Ward and Hughes of London in 1882. The tower was reconstructed in 1903. The church and mausoleum were designated as Grade I listed in 1960.

St Peter's has a ring of six bells: five including the tenor were cast in 1765 by Robert Wells I of Aldbourne; the treble was cast in 1899 by Thomas Blackbourn of Salisbury. Monuments in the churchyard include chest tombs from the 18th and 19th centuries, and a carved stone cross commemorating John Wordsworth (bishop of Salisbury until his death in 1911) and his first wife Susan.

The parish is now one of 13 in the Chalke Valley benefice.

== Local government ==
The civil parish elects a parish council. It is in the area of Wiltshire Council unitary authority, which performs all significant local government functions.

The ancient parish of Britford included the tithing of East Harnham, which became a separate ecclesiastical parish in 1855 after a church was built there in the previous year. East Harnham continued as part of Britford civil parish until 1896, when it became a separate parish; in 1904 it joined the borough of Salisbury and is now part of Harnham suburb.

== Amenities ==
Britford has a Church of England primary school, built in 1959 to replace a National School which opened in 1853. On 1 April 2010 it merged with the primary school in Odstock to form Longford C of E Primary School, named after the Longford estate. Both sets of buildings remain in use: the Britford site teaches Key Stage 1 and the Odstock site teaches Key Stage 2.

Salisbury District Hospital is in the parish about 1 mile (1.6 km) southwest of the village.

A Park and Ride bus service for journeys to Salisbury operates from a site on the A338 near the village.

Britford Water Meadows is a biological Site of Special Scientific Interest.

== Sources ==
- Cross, Donald Alfred Edgar (1970). "The Salisbury Avon Navigation". Industrial Archaeology. VII (2). David & Charles: 121–135.
- Pevsner, Nikolaus; Cherry, Bridget (revision) (1975) [1963]. Wiltshire. The Buildings of England (revised ed.). Harmondsworth: Penguin Books. pp. 142–144. ISBN 0-14-0710-26-4.
