= Henry Wallop (disambiguation) =

Sir Henry Wallop (died 1599) was an English statesman.

Henry Wallop may also refer to these English politicians:

- Henry Wallop (died 1642)
- Henry Wallop (died 1794)
