= William Brodrick (1763–1819) =

British politician

The Hon. William Brodrick (14 February 1763 – 29 April 1819) was a British Member of Parliament and Government official.

He was born the 5th son of George Brodrick, 3rd Viscount Midleton and younger brother of George Brodrick, 4th Viscount Midleton. He was educated at Eton College (1775–1780), St. John’s College, Cambridge (1780–1783) and Lincoln's Inn (1782).

He was appointed Secretary to the Board of Control from 1793 to 1803, which involved serving as the chief official in London responsible for Indian affairs. He succeeded his brother George as MP for Whitchurch, sitting from 1796 to 1818 in both the Parliament of Great Britain and then the Parliament of the United Kingdom. In the administration of Henry Addington he served as one of the Lords Commissioners of the Treasury from 1802 to 1803.

He was married to Mary Preston of County Meath but died childless of failing health in Nice.

Parliament of Great Britain
Preceded by George Brodrick, 4th Viscount Midleton; John Townshend, 2nd Viscount Sydney	Member of Parliament for Whitchurch; 1796–1800; With: John Townshend, 2nd Viscount Sydney	Succeeded by Parliament of the United Kingdom
Parliament of the United Kingdom
Preceded by Parliament of Great Britain	Member of Parliament for Whitchurch; 1800–1816; With: Hon. William Townshend 1800–1816; Horatio George Powys Townshend 1816–1818	Succeeded by Sir Samuel Scott; Horatio George Powys Townshend
