= Horatio Townshend (1780–1843) =

British military officer and politician (1780–1843)

Colonel The Honourable Sir Horatio Townshend KCH
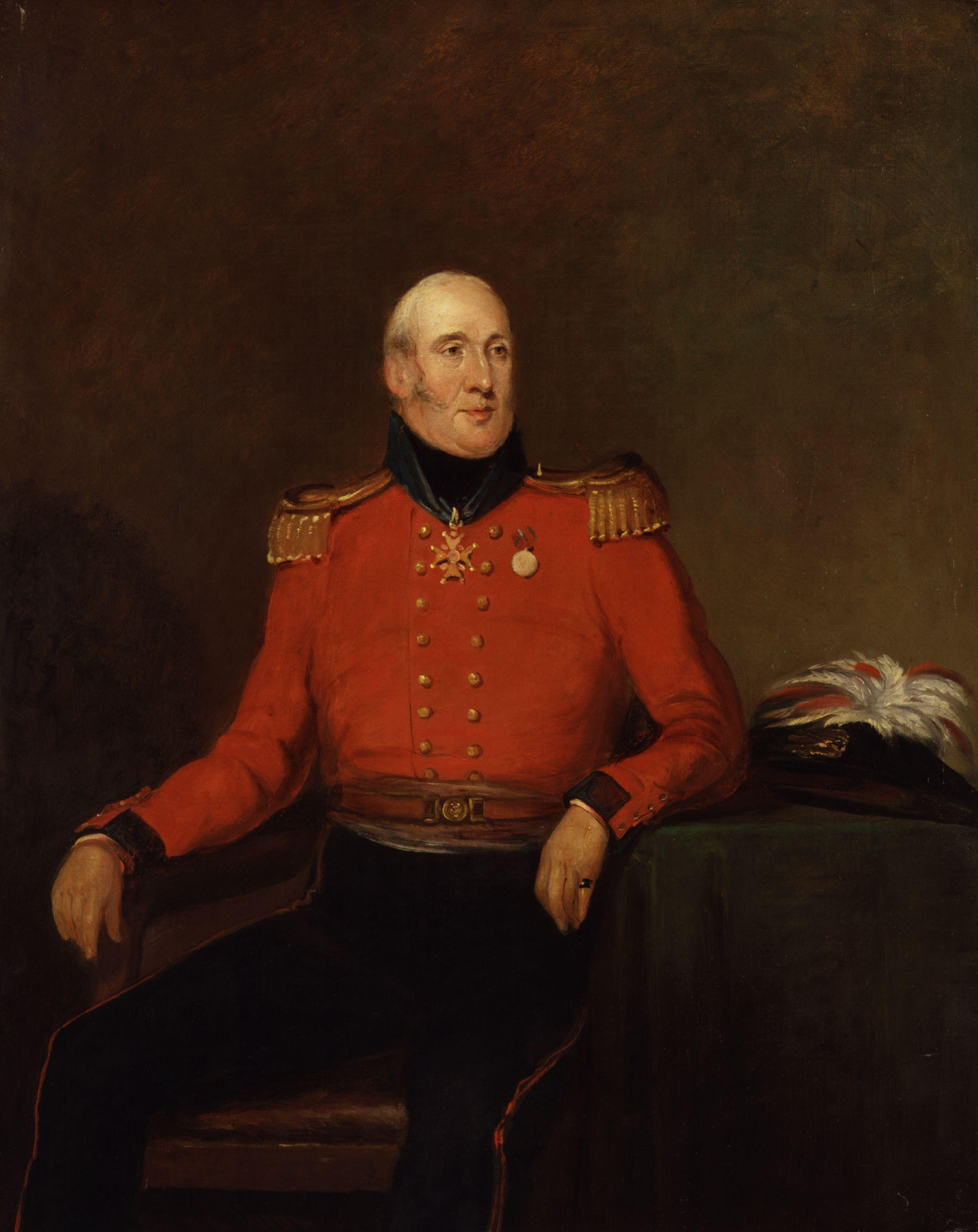

Member of Parliament for Whitchurch
- In office 25 February 1831 – 3 December 1832
- Preceded by: John Townshend
- Succeeded by: Constituency abolished
- In office 13 August 1816 – 2 June 1826
- Preceded by: William Townshend
- Succeeded by: John Townshend

Personal details
- Born: Horatio George Powys Townshend; 6 February 1780
- Died: 25 May 1843 (aged 63) Bolton Street, London, England
- Party: Tory
- Parent(s): Thomas Townshend, 1st Viscount Sydney; Elizabeth Powys
- Education: Eton College

Military service
- Allegiance: Great Britain (1795–1800); United Kingdom (1801–1830)
- Branch/service: Grenadier Guards
- Years of service: 1795–1830
- Rank: Colonel
- Battles/wars: War of the Second Coalition; Anglo-Russian invasion of Holland; War of the Third Coalition; Battle of Maida; Peninsular War; Battle of Corunna; Battle of Barrosa; Battle of the Bidassoa; Battle of Bayonne; War of the Fifth Coalition; Walcheren Campaign; Hundred Days; Battle of Quatre Bras; Battle of Waterloo

Sir Horatio George Powys Townshend (6 February 1780 – 25 May 1843) was a British politician and military officer who served as Member of Parliament (MP) for Whitchurch from 1816 to 1826 and 1831 to 1832. He commanded the Grenadier Guards from 1821 to 1830.

== Early life and education ==
Horatio George Powys Townshend was born on 6 February 1780, the youngest son of Thomas Townshend, 1st Viscount Sydney and Elizabeth Townshend, Viscountess Sydney. His father was a politician who had previously served as Home Secretary and had been the MP for Whitchurch.

Townshend was educated at Eton College from 1787 to 1791.

== Career ==
After his education at Eton, Townshend began his career in the Royal Navy in 1792, but left due to health problems and then entered the Grenadier Guards as an Ensign on 23 September 1795. He became Lieutenant and Captain in 1799; Captain and Lieutenant Colonel in 1809; and Brevet Colonel in 1819. He becamd Lieutenant Colonel Commander in 1821 and served until he was placed on Half-pay in 1830 due to ill health from his wounds and service. Townshend embarked with the Grenadier Guards at the Anglo-Russian invasion of Holland in 1799 and accompanied it to Sicily in 1806 and fought at the Battle of Maida. He went with it to Portugal in 1808 and was in retreat at the Battle of Corunna in 1809. In the same year, he fought in the Walcheren Campaign, and in 1811 at the Battle of Barrosa he had a horse shot under him and was hit twice. He then joined the Army in the North of Spain and entered France in 1813 and was taken prisoner at the Sortie from the Battle of Bayonne in 1814. Following the resumption of the war in 1815, he proceeded with his battalion to the Netherlands. The same year, he was severely wounded at the Battle of Quatre Bras, and fought at the Battle of Waterloo.

Townshend became the MP for Whitchurch in 1816, and was reelected at the 1820 general election. At the 1826 general election, he stood down and made way for his nephew, John Townshend, but after his nephew's accession to a peerage, he returned at the 1831 general election. His parliamentary career ended following the abolishment of the Whitchurch constituency at the 1832 general election.

Townshend was the Deputy Ranger for St. James's, Green and Hyde Parks from 1823 to 1831. In 1836, Townshend was appointed Lieutenant Governor of the Round Tower at Windsor Castle by King William IV as a reward for his services and held the position until his death.

== Death and funeral ==
Townshend died after a lengthy illness on 25 May 1843 at the age of 63 at his home in Bolton Street. At his request, his burial pall was dressed in the ceremonial colours of the Grenadier Guards, and his remains were carried to the family vault in Chiselhurst by regimental survivors of Waterloo.

== Honours ==
- On 25 September 1835, Townshend became a Knight Commander of the Royal Guelphic Order

== See also ==
- List of knights commander of the Royal Guelphic Order
