= William Selwyn (MP for Whitchurch) =

English barrister and Member of Parliament

William Selwyn (14 June 1732 – 21 August 1817) was an English barrister and Member of Parliament.

== Life ==
He was the second son of Henry Selwyn of Westminster and his wife Ruth Compton, daughter of Anthony Compton of Gainslow near Berwick-on-Tweed. This made him first cousin to George Augustus Selwyn. He was educated at Westminster School and graduated from Trinity College, Cambridge in 1749. He entered Lincoln's Inn in 1749 and was called to the bar five years later. On 15 September 1763 he married Frances Elizabeth Dodd, daughter of John Dodd of Woodford, Essex, with whom he had three sons and three daughters. In 1780 he was made King's Counsel and a bencher at Lincoln's Inn.

In 1783 he was returned for the constituency of Whitchurch when a seat there fell vacant after Thomas Townshend was elevated to the peerage. He followed the same political line as Townshend, backing William Pitt the Younger and voting against the Fox-North coalition. He is only reported in Hansard as having made one speech - this was on 30 April 1783, drawing on his legal experience to back the necessity of a bill for arresting those found carrying housebreaking tools at night. Townshend's son John was returned for Whitchurch in 1790 and so Selwyn did not stand again, though he was made treasurer of Lincoln's Inn in 1793.

== Sources ==
- "SELWYN, William (1732-1817), of Boxley, Kent". History of Parliament Online. Archived from the original on 19 May 2018.

Parliament of the United Kingdom
Preceded by The Viscount Midleton; Thomas Townshend	Member of Parliament for Whitchurch; 1783–1790; With: The Viscount Midleton	Succeeded by The Viscount Midleton; Hon. John Townshend
