= Moat House, Britford =

Moat House
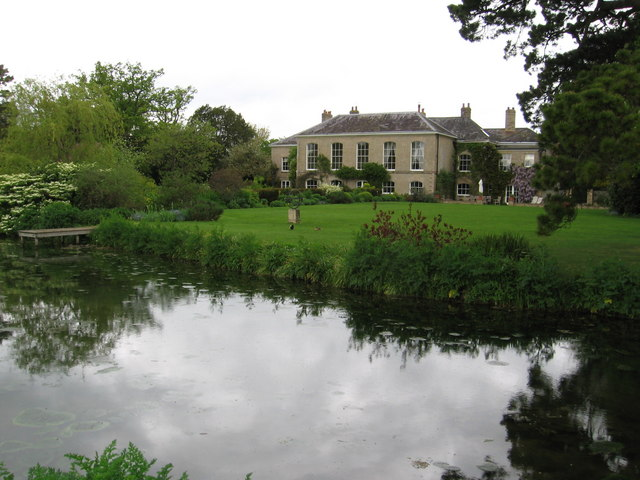
- Moat House, Britford, 2009

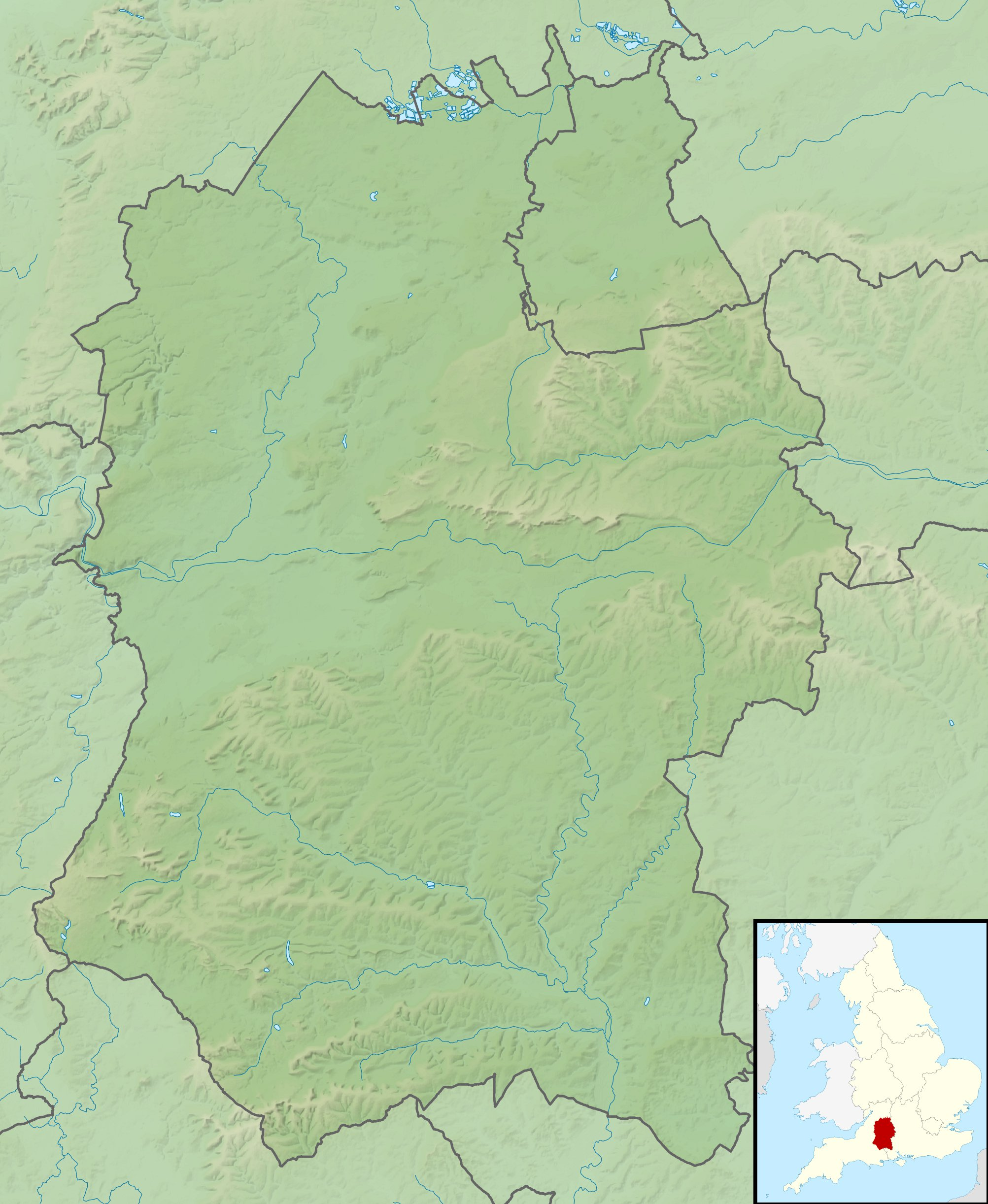
- Location within Wiltshire
- 51.0539°N 1.7714°W
- Type: House
- Location: Britford, Wiltshire, England

History
- Built: 17th century

Listed Building – Grade II
- Official name: Moat House, 1 and 2, Church Lane
- Designated: 23 March 1960
- Reference no.: 1023794

Moat House, a Grade II listed building in Britford, Wiltshire, England, is a 17th-century building with 18th and 19th century remodelling, surrounded by a moat. It is now divided into two houses.

== History ==
The property on Church Lane was owned by the Jervoise family from 1542; the present 17th-century house is surrounded by a moat. The wide Georgian Gothic front was added in 1766, and the south (garden) range in c.1830–1840. It is now divided into two houses.

It is possible that the large square moat is an 18th-century remodelling of an earlier one. Another addition in the 1760s was a pigeon house or dovecote in the garden, its ogee-headed windows matching those added to the house.
