= William Augustus Townshend =

British politician (1776–1816)

William Augustus Townshend (10 March 1776 – 3 July 1816) was a British politician and soldier. He sat as MP for Whitchurch from 15 July 1800 till his death on 3 July 1816.

He served as ensign of the 1st Foot Regiment of Foot Guards in 1792; he was promoted to lieutenant and captain in 1794; he was promoted to lieutenant in the West Kent Yemomanry Cavalry in 1800 but retired upon succeeding to his elder brother's seat.

He was the second son of Thomas Townshend, 1st Viscount Sydney and the brother of Horatio Townshend and Lord John Townshend. He was educated at Eton in 1783. He died unmarried.
