= Thomas Hussey (MP for Whitchurch) =

English politician

Thomas Hussey (1597 - December 1657) of Hungerford Park was an English politician who sat in the House of Commons at various times between 1645 and 1657.

Thomas Hussey of Hungerford purchased a lease of Hungerford Park from John Herbert.

In 1645, Hussey was elected Member of Parliament for Whitchurch in the Long Parliament and remained until 1653. In 1650 he purchased a part of Kintbury from Henry Marten. In 1656 he was elected MP for Andover in the Second Protectorate Parliament.

Hussey died in 1657 and left Hungerford Park to his wife Catherine for her life with remainder to his eldest son Thomas Hussey.

== Confusion of identities ==
Thomas Hussey of Hungerford is confused by A.B. Beavan with Thomas Hussey Sr. of Shere and Abinger in Surrey (died 1655), a citizen of London of the Worshipful Company of Grocers, who became alderman of the City of London for Vintry ward on 17 Jul 1645, and was father of Thomas Hussey Jr. (died 1671), citizen and Grocer, of Hampstead, alderman from 1661.

Parliament of England
Preceded by Sir Thomas Jervoise; Richard Jervoise	Member of Parliament for Whitchurch; 1645–1653; With: Sir Thomas Jervoise	Succeeded by Not represented in Barebones Parliament
Preceded by John Duns	Member of Parliament for Andover; 1656	Succeeded by Gabriel Beck; Robert Gough
