= Richard Jervoise =

Richard Jervoise (born 1615) was an English politician who sat in the House of Commons between 1640 and 1645.

Jervoise was the son of Sir Thomas Jervoise of Britford and Herriard, and his wife Lucy Powlet, daughter of Sir Richard Powlet of Herriard.

In April 1640, Jervoise was elected Member of Parliament for Whitchurch in the Short Parliament together with his father. Father and son were re-elected MPs for Whitchurch for the Long Parliament in November 1640. Jervoise died sometime before 1645.

Jervoise married Frances Croke, daughter of Sir George Croke and had two daughters. His widow remarried after his death.

Parliament of England
Vacant Parliament suspended since 1629	Member of Parliament for Whitchurch; 1640–1645; With: Sir Thomas Jervoise	Succeeded by Sir Thomas Jervoise; Thomas Hussey
