= Britford Water Meadows =

Protected area in Wiltshire, England

Coordinates: 51.04571°N 1.76458°W

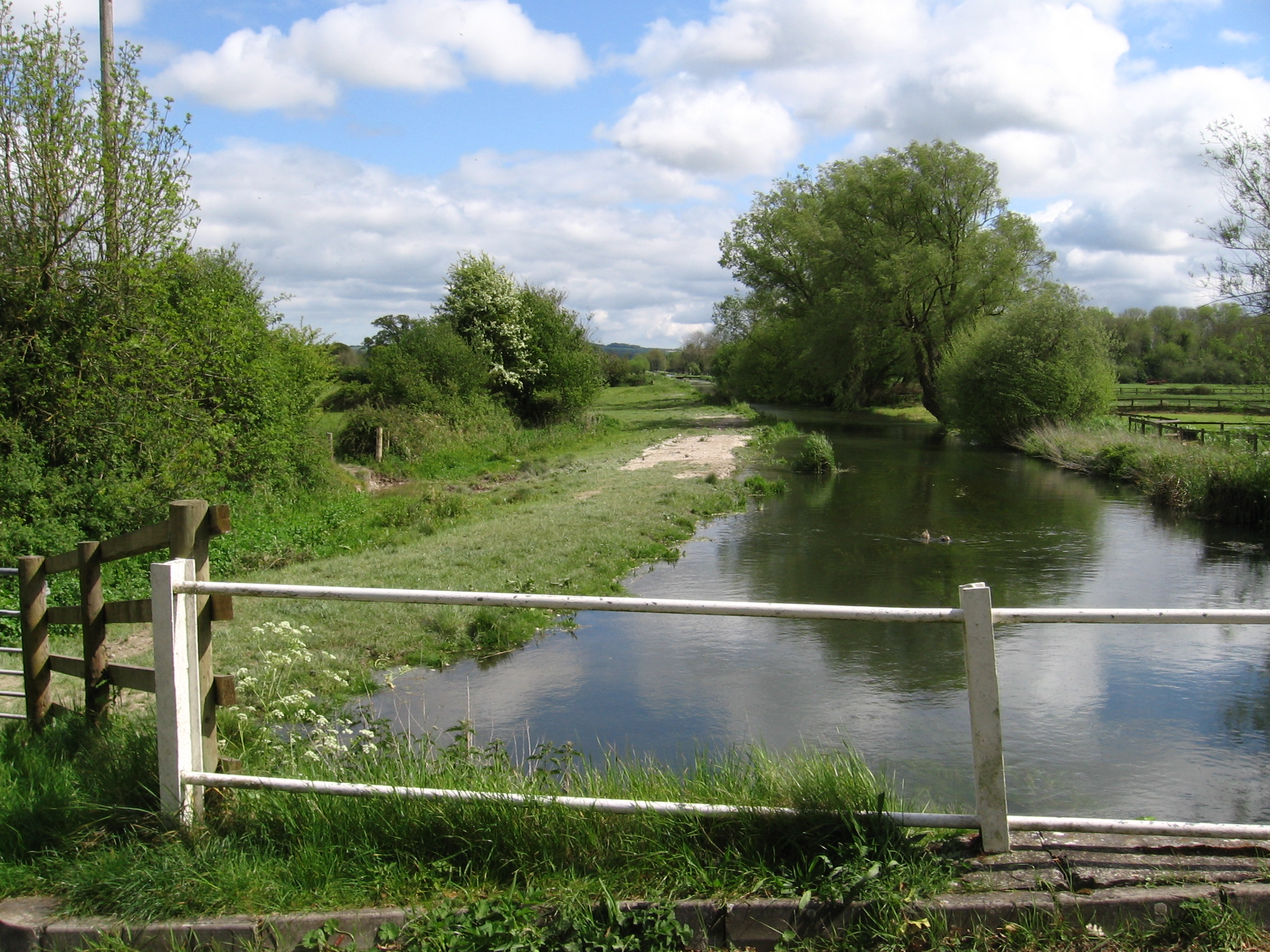
Britford Water Meadows

Britford Water Meadows (grid reference SU166274) is a biological Site of Special Scientific Interest at Britford, south of Salisbury in Wiltshire. It has an area of 45 acres (18 ha) and was notified in 1975.

== Sources ==
- Natural England citation sheet for the site (accessed 22 March 2022)
