= Thomas Jervoise (died 1654) =

English politician (1587–1654)

Sir Thomas Jervoise (11 June 1587 – 20 October 1654) was an English politician who sat in the House of Commons variously between 1621 and 1653. He was a staunch supporter of the Parliamentary side during the English Civil War.

Jervoise was a member of the Jervoise family of Britford, Wiltshire. He received his knighthood from James I at Sarum on 20 August 1607.

In 1621 Jervoise was elected Member of Parliament for Whitchurch and held the seat until 1625. He was re-elected in 1628 and sat until 1629, when King Charles decided to rule without parliament. Jervoise was re-elected MP for Whitchurch in April 1640 for the Short Parliament, and again in November 1640 for the Long Parliament.

He was a puritan and a strong supporter of the parliamentary cause. On the outbreak of the Civil War Jervoise was Colonel of one of the regiments of Hampshire Trained Bands and four companies of his regiment served alongside Sir William Waller's Parliamentarian Southern Association Army at the Siege of Portsmouth.

He survived Pride's Purge and was a member of the Rump Parliament until 1653.

In July 1601, aged 14, Jervoise married Lucy Powlet, daughter of Sir Richard Powlet of Herriard and Freefolk, Hampshire, and thereby acquired the Herriard estate and influence in Hampshire, to add to his family's substantial estates in Wiltshire, Worcestershire and Shropshire. Lucy died in 1641, and within two years Jervoise married Frances, daughter of Thomas Jay of Foscott, Buckinghamshire. He had four sons (one predeceased) and two daughters by his first wife, and two sons by his second.

His son Richard Jervoise was MP with him at Whitchurch, and his eldest son Thomas Jervoise was later MP for Hampshire.

Jervoise died at the age of 67 at Weoley Castle.

Parliament of England
Preceded by Sir Edward Barrett; Sir Richard Paulet	Member of Parliament for Whitchurch; 1620–1629; With: Robert Oxenbridge 1620–1624; Henry Wallop 1624–1625; Robert Oxenbridge 1625–1628; Sir John Jephson 1628–1829	Parliament suspended until 1640
Parliament suspended since 1629	Member of Parliament for Whitchurch; 1640–1653; With: Richard Jervoise 1640-c1645 Thomas Hussey 1645–1653	Not represented in Barebones Parliament
