= Whitchurch (constituency) =

Former parliamentary constituency in the United Kingdom

- Former borough constituency for the House of Commons

1586–1832
- Seats: Two

Whitchurch was a parliamentary borough in the English County of Hampshire, which elected two Members of Parliament (MPs) to the Unreformed House of Commons from 1586 until 1832, when the borough was abolished by the Great Reform Act.

== History ==
Whitchurch was one of a number of new boroughs created in the south of England by Queen Elizabeth I. The borough consisted of most of the town of Whitchurch in northern Hampshire, a market town which by the 19th century had shrunk to insignificance. In 1831, the population of the borough was approximately 1,673, and the town contained 261 houses of which 214 were within the borough.

Following a House of Commons decision in 1708, the right to vote was exercised by the freeholders of any tenements which had not been divided since the time of William III (or by their husbands if the freeholder was a woman). Whitchurch was therefore in effect a "burgage" borough (one where the vote was tied to ownership of specific properties). There were still competitive elections around the turn of the 18th century when no one influence was entirely predominant, and it is recorded that in 1685 it was one of the constituencies that King James II thought worth visiting on an electioneering tour soon after his accession. But by 1700 the Duke of Bolton, as the most powerful local landowner, could generally see his preferred candidates elected, and by the middle of the century, as in other burgage boroughs, a majority of the burgages were concentrated in the hands of two owners and Whitchurch had become an utterly secure pocket borough.

By the time of the Great Reform Act the number of "voters" was estimated to be about 84, but there had been no contested election since 1721; only 13 of the burgages were not owned by one of the two patrons, according to Oldfield, writing in 1816. Of course, had there been an election the two proprietors themselves could not have voted more than once; but they would have been able to simply make a temporary conveyance of each property to a reliable deputy, as frequently happened elsewhere, to ensure that their majority share of the ownership was reflected in the voting.

In the 1740s, these "patrons" were John Wallop, 1st Earl of Portsmouth and John Selwyn, who chose one MP each; Selwyn invariably made use of the seat for himself. After Selwyn's death in 1751 his share was inherited by his son-in-law, Thomas Townshend, who used the seat for his son, a rising minister. By the 1770s the former Portsmouth share of the representation was also in Townshend hands, and was used to find a seat for another relative, George Brodrick, 4th Viscount Midleton.

Whitchurch was abolished as a separate constituency by the Reform Act, the town being included in the Northern division of Hampshire thereafter.

== Members of Parliament ==
=== 1584-1640 ===
Parliament	First member	Second member
1584	John Cooper	Henry Audley
1586	John Cooper	Henry Audley
1588	Richard Fiennes	Henry Audley
1593	Robert West	Richard Theakston
1597	Thomas Henshaw	Richard Carey
1601	Thomas Henshaw	Thomas Crompton
1604	Thomas Brookes	Sir Richard Paulet
1614	Sir Edward Barrett	Sir Richard Paulet
1621-1622	Sir Thomas Jervoise	Sir Robert Oxenbridge
1624	Sir Henry Wallop	Sir Thomas Jervoise
1625	Sir Thomas Jervoise	Sir Robert Oxenbridge
1626	Sir Thomas Jervoise	Sir Robert Oxenbridge
1628	Sir Thomas Jervoise	Sir John Jephson
1629–1640	No Parliaments summoned	

=== 1640-1832 ===
Year	First member	First party	Second member	Second party
April 1640	Sir Thomas Jervoise		Richard Jervoise	Parliamentarian
November 1640	Sir Thomas Jervoise		Richard Jervoise	Parliamentarian
1645	Sir Thomas Jervoise		Thomas Hussey	
1653	Whitchurch was unrepresented in the Barebones Parliament and the First and Second Parliaments of the Protectorate			
January 1659	Sir Henry Vane		Robert Reynolds	
May 1659	Not represented in the restored Rump			
April 1660	Robert Wallop		Giles Hungerford	
June 1660	Henry Wallop		Giles Hungerford	
1674	Richard Ayliffe		Giles Hungerford	
1679	Richard Ayliffe		Henry Wallop	
1685	Lord James Russell		Henry Wallop	
1692	Lord James Russell		Christopher Stokes	
1698	Lord James Russell		Richard Wollaston	
1701	Major-General John Shrimpton		Richard Wollaston	
January 1708	Frederick Tylney (see biog. under Richard Child, 1st Earl Tylney)		Richard Wollaston	
February 1708	Charles Wither		Richard Wollaston	
May 1708	Thomas Lewis		Frederick Tylney	
December 1708	Richard Wollaston		George William Brydges	
1710	Frederick Tylney		Thomas Vernon	
1715	General George Carpenter		Thomas Vernon	
May 1721	General George Carpenter		Frederick Tylney	
June 1721	General George Carpenter		John Conduitt	Government Whig
1722	Thomas Vernon		John Conduitt	Government Whig
February 1727	Thomas Farrington		John Conduitt	Government Whig
August 1727	John Selwyn		John Conduitt	Government Whig
1734	John Selwyn, junior		John Conduitt	Government Whig
1735	John Selwyn, junior		Colonel John Mordaunt	Government Whig
1741	John Selwyn, junior		John Wallop	Government Whig
1742	John Selwyn, junior		William Sloper	
January 1743	John Selwyn, junior		Charles Clarke	
February 1743	John Selwyn, junior		Brigadier Thomas Wentworth	
1747	John Selwyn, junior		Charles Wallop	
1751	Lord Robert Bertie		Charles Wallop	
1754	William Powlett		Thomas Townshend	Whig
1757	George Jennings		Thomas Townshend	Whig
1768	Hon. Henry Wallop		Thomas Townshend	Whig
1774	The Viscount Midleton		Thomas Townshend	Whig
1783	The Viscount Midleton		William Selwyn	
1790	The Viscount Midleton		Hon. John Townshend	
1796	Hon. William Brodrick		Hon. John Townshend	
1800	Hon. William Brodrick		Hon. William Townshend	
1816	Hon. William Brodrick		Horatio George Powys Townshend	Tory
1818	Sir Samuel Scott	Tory	Horatio George Powys Townshend	Tory
1826	Sir Samuel Scott	Tory	Hon. John Robert Townshend	Tory
1831	Sir Samuel Scott	Tory	Horatio George Powys Townshend	Tory
1832	Constituency abolished			
