= Elizabeth Townshend, Viscountess Sydney =

British noble (1736-1826)

Elizabeth Townshend, Viscountess Sydney (7 April 1736 – 1 May 1826) was the wife of Thomas Townshend, 1st Viscount Sydney.

She was the daughter of Richard Powys, MP, and his wife, the former Lady Mary Brudenell, daughter of George Brudenell, 3rd Earl of Cardigan. Elizabeth's sister Mary married James Stopford, 2nd Earl of Courtown. Following their father's death in 1743, their mother remarried, her second husband being Thomas Bowlby, MP.

Elizabeth herself married the viscount on 19 May 1760. They had twelve children in all, several of whom died in infancy. They included:

- Hon. Georgiana Townshend (1761-1835)
- Hon. Mary Elizabeth Townshend (1762-1821), who married General John Pitt, 2nd Earl of Chatham
- John Thomas Townshend, 2nd Viscount Sydney of St. Leonards (1764-1831)
- Albinia Ann (1765-1770)
- Horatio George Townshend (1766-1773)
- Frederick Roger (1770-1782)
- Hon. Frances Townshend (1772-1854)
- Hon. Henrietta Catherine Townshend (1773-1814) who married Charles Montagu-Scott, 4th Duke of Buccleuch, and had children
- Sophia Charlotte (1777)
- William Augustus Townshend (1776-1816)

From 1791 to 1818, she was a Lady of the Bedchamber to Charlotte of Mecklenburg-Strelitz, queen consort of King George III of the United Kingdom.

The viscount died in June 1800, aged 67, and was succeeded in his titles by his son, John Thomas. Viscountess Sydney died in May 1826, aged 90.
