= Henry Wallop (died 1794) =

British soldier and politician

Henry Wallop (1743? – August 1794) was a British soldier and politician, the second son of John Wallop, Viscount Lymington.

Wallop was commissioned as a lieutenant and captain in the 3rd Regiment of Foot Guards in 1762. On the death of Henry Bilson-Legge, Member of Parliament for Hampshire in 1764, Wallop's elder brother, John Wallop, 2nd Earl of Portsmouth, agreed not to use his interest in the by-election in exchange for the post of groom of the bedchamber to the Duke of Cumberland for Henry. George Grenville recommended him to King George, but the King declined to interfere with his brother's appointments to that office. However, on 24 August 1765, Wallop was appointed a Royal Groom of the Bedchamber in place of Henry Seymour, an office he held until 1771.

On 29 March 1768, he was promoted to a captaincy in the 41st Regiment of Foot. In the 1768 election, he was returned for Whitchurch by his brother, who had inherited an electoral interest there from their mother. He had little recorded Parliamentary activity, although he was set down as favoring the Royal Marriages Act 1772 (but absent for the vote) and in favor of the North Ministry before the 1774 election. However, he did not stand for Parliament again and died a bachelor in August 1794.

Parliament of Great Britain
Preceded by Thomas Townshend; George Jennings	Member of Parliament for Whitchurch; 1768–1774; With: Thomas Townshend	Succeeded by Thomas Townshend; The Viscount Midleton
