= Samuel Scott, 2nd Baronet of Lytchet Minster =

Sir Samuel Scott, 2nd Baronet of Lytchet Minster

MP for Malmesbury
- In office 1802–1806

MP for Camelford
- In office 1812–1818

MP for Whitchurch
- In office 1818–1832

Personal details
- Born: 29 April 1772
- Died: 30 September 1849 (aged 77)
- Party: Tory
- Parent: Claude Scott (father)

Sir Samuel Scott, 2nd Baronet of Lytchet Minster (29 April 1772 – 30 September 1849) was an English politician. He was member of parliament for Malmesbury, Camelford and Whitchurch.
