= Thomas Townshend, 1st Viscount Sydney =

British politician (1733–1800)

The Right Honourable The Viscount Sydney PC
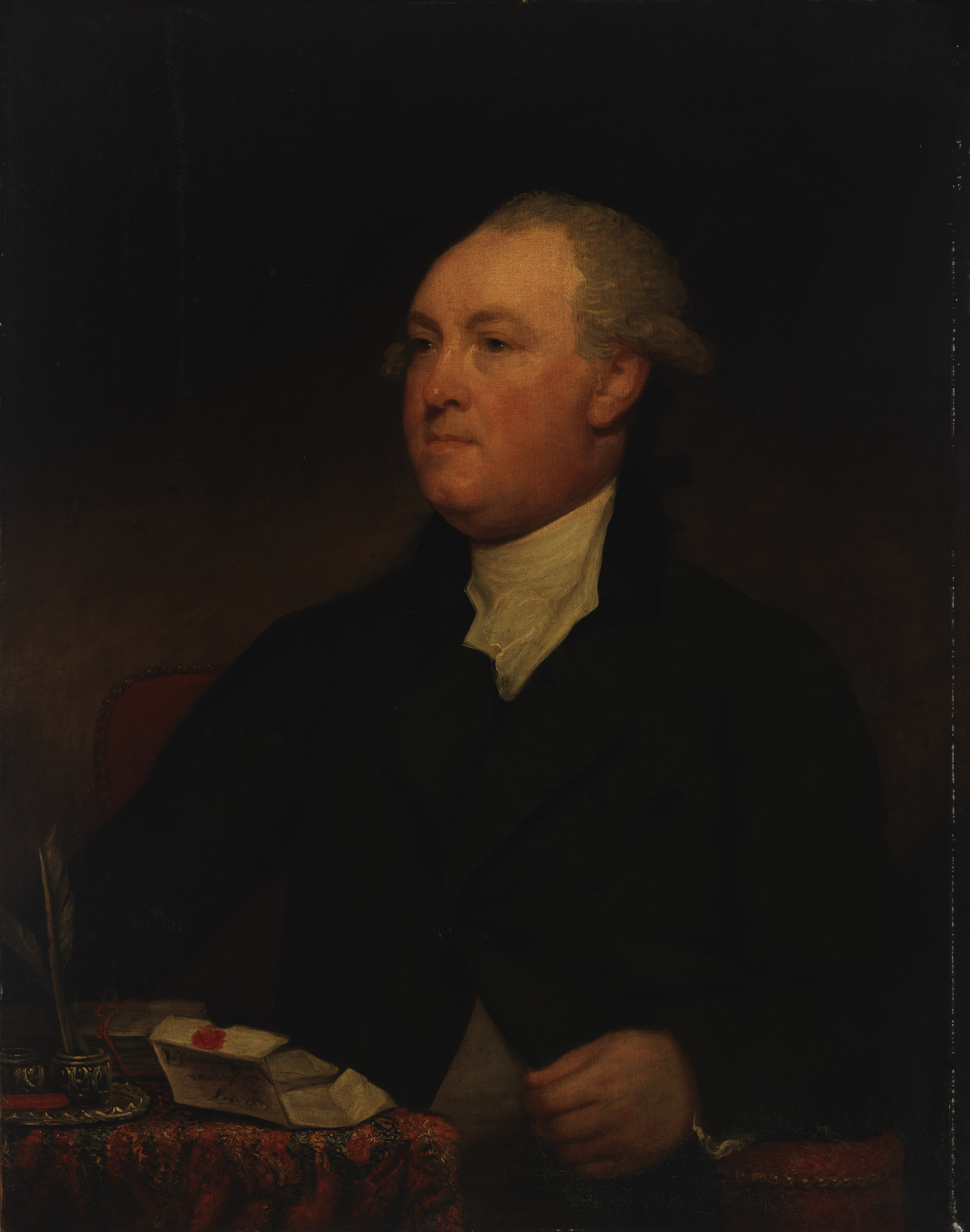
- c. 1785 portrait of Sydney attributed to Gilbert Stuart

Home Secretary
- In office 23 December 1783 – 5 June 1789
- Monarch: George III
- Prime Minister: William Pitt the Younger
- Preceded by: The Earl Temple
- Succeeded by: The Lord Grenville
- In office 10 July 1782 – 2 April 1783
- Monarch: George III
- Prime Minister: The Earl of Shelburne
- Preceded by: The Earl of Shelburne
- Succeeded by: Lord North

Justice in Eyre south of the Trent
- In office 19 June 1789 – 30 June 1800
- Preceded by: Fletcher Norton, 1st Baron Grantley
- Succeeded by: Thomas Grenville

President of the Board of Control
- In office 4 September 1784 – 6 March 1790
- Prime Minister: William Pitt the Younger
- Preceded by: New Office
- Succeeded by: William Grenville, 1st Baron Grenville

Leader of the House of Lords
- In office December 1783 – June 1789
- Prime Minister: William Pitt the Younger
- Preceded by: George Nugent-Temple-Grenville, 1st Marquess of Buckingham
- Succeeded by: Francis Osborne, 5th Duke of Leeds

President of the Committee on Trade and Foreign Plantations
- In office 5 March 1784 – 23 August 1786
- Monarch: George III
- Prime Minister: William Pitt the Younger
- Preceded by: The Lord Grantham (First Lord of Trade)
- Succeeded by: The Earl of Liverpool (President of the Board of Trade)

Leader of the House of Commons
- In office 10 July 1782 – 6 March 1783
- Prime Minister: William Petty, 2nd Earl of Shelburne
- Preceded by: Charles James Fox
- Succeeded by: Charles James Fox

Secretary at War
- In office 1782–1782
- Prime Minister: Charles Watson-Wentworth, 2nd Marquess of Rockingham
- Preceded by: Charles Jenkinson
- Succeeded by: George Yonge

Paymaster of the Forces
- In office 9 December 1767 – 17 June 1768
- Monarch: George III of the United Kingdom
- Preceded by: Frederick North, Lord North; George Cooke (died 1768)
- Succeeded by: Richard Rigby

Member of Parliament for Whitchurch
- In office 1754–1783
- Preceded by: Charles Wallop; Lord Robert Bertie
- Succeeded by: George Brodrick, 4th Viscount Midleton; William Selwyn (MP for Whitchurch)

Personal details
- Born: 24 February 1733 Sidcup, Kent, England
- Died: 30 June 1800 (aged 67) Sidcup, Kent, England
- Party: Whig
- Spouse: Elizabeth Powys (1736–1826)
- Children: Mary; John
- Parent(s): Thomas Townshend; Albinia Selwyn
- Education: Clare College, Cambridge

Thomas Townshend, 1st Viscount Sydney, PC (24 February 1733 – 30 June 1800) was a British politician who sat in the House of Commons from 1754 to 1783 when he was raised to the peerage as Baron Sydney. He held several important Cabinet posts in the second half of the 18th century. The cities of Sydney in Nova Scotia, Canada, and Sydney in New South Wales, Australia were named in his honour, in 1785 and 1788, respectively.

== Background and education ==
Townshend was born in Frognal House, Sidcup, Kent, the son of the Hon. Thomas Townshend, who was the second son of Charles Townshend, 2nd Viscount Townshend, also known as "Turnip" Townshend for his agricultural innovations. Thomas Townshend the younger's mother was Albinia, daughter of John Selwyn. He was educated at Clare College, Cambridge.

== Political career ==
Townshend was elected to the House of Commons in 1754 as Whig member for Whitchurch in Hampshire, and held that seat till his elevation to the peerage in 1783. He initially aligned himself with his great-uncle the Duke of Newcastle, but later joined William Pitt the Elder in opposition to George Grenville.

He held the offices of Clerk of the Household to the Prince of Wales (1756–1760) and Clerk of the Green Cloth from 1761 to 1762. In 1765 he was also made a Lord of the Treasury in the first Rockingham ministry and continued in that office in the Pitt (then Lord Chatham) administration until December 1767, when he became a member of the Privy Council and joint-Paymaster of the Forces. During the ministry of Lord Chatham and the Duke of Grafton he supported the position his cousin Charles Townshend was in with regard to the American revenue program. Townshend was forced out of office in June 1768 by Grafton who wanted Rigby as Paymaster of the Forces to gain favour with the Duke of Bedford.

Townshend remained in opposition until the end of Lord North's ministry and spoke frequently in the House of Commons against the American Revolutionary War. Although he had no close party connection, he was inclined toward the Chathamites. He took office again as secretary at war in the second Rockingham ministry. When Lord Shelburne became Prime Minister in July 1782, Townshend succeeded him as Home Secretary and became Leader of the House of Commons.

Among the matters requiring attention that he inherited from Shelburne was a scheme for attacking the Spanish possessions in South America. A memorandum which Shelburne wrote to him at this time listing matters requiring his urgent attention said: "Preparations and Plans for W. India [Spanish America]. Expeditions require to be set forward—Major Dalrymple has a Plan against the Spanish Settlements". For assistance in planning the expedition, Townshend turned to Captain Arthur Phillip. The plan drawn up by Phillip and approved by Townshend in September 1782 was for a squadron of three ships of the line and a frigate to mount a raid on Buenos Aires and Monte Video, from there to proceed to the coasts of Chile, Peru and Mexico to maraud, and ultimately to cross the Pacific to join the British East Indian squadron for an attack on Manila, the capital of the Spanish Philippines. The expedition sailed on 16 January 1783, under the command of Commodore Sir Robert Kingsmill. Phillip was given command of one of the ships of the line, the 64-gun HMS Europa, or Europe. Shortly after sailing an armistice was concluded between Great Britain and Spain. Phillip took the Europe to India to join the British East Indian squadron, but after his return to England in April 1784, remained in close contact with Townshend (now Lord Sydney) and the Home Office Under Secretary, Evan Nepean. From October 1784 to September 1786 he was employed by Nepean, who was in charge of the Secret Service relating to the Bourbon Powers, France and Spain, to spy on the French naval arsenals at Toulon and other ports.

Townshend was created Baron Sydney of Chislehurst and entered the House of Lords on 6 March 1783. He originally proposed his title to be Baron Sidney, in honour of his kinsman, the renowned opponent of royal tyranny, Algernon Sidney, however he was worried that other members of his family might have claims on it and then suggested Sydenham, the name of a village near his home in Kent, before settling on Sydney. He opposed the Fox-North coalition and returned to political office with Pitt, serving as Home Secretary from 1783 to 1789.

In Canada, Sydney, Nova Scotia on Cape Breton Island (now the province of Nova Scotia), was founded by British Col. Joseph Frederick Wallet DesBarres in 1785, and named in honour of Thomas Townshend, 1st Viscount Sydney (Home Secretary in the British cabinet at the time). Lord Sydney appointed Col. DesBarres governor of the new colony of Cape Breton Island.

Following the loss of the Thirteen Colonies, Sydney, as Home Secretary in the Pitt Government, was given responsibility for devising a plan to settle convicts at Botany Bay. His choice of Arthur Phillip as Governor was inspired, and Phillip's leadership was instrumental in ensuring the penal colony survived the early years of struggle and famine. On 26 January 1788, Phillip named Sydney Cove in honour of Sydney and the settlement became known as Sydney Town. In 1789 Townshend was created Viscount Sydney.

Although the colonisation of New South Wales was just one among many responsibilities of the Secretary of State, Sydney was recognised as the "Originator of the Plan of Colonization for New South Wales" by David Collins, who dedicated his Account of the English Colony in New South Wales with these words. Collins wrote that Sydney's "benevolent Mind" had led him "to conceive this Method of redeeming many Lives that might be forfeit to the offended Laws; but which, being preserved under salutary Regulations, might afterward become useful to Society"; and to Sydney's "Patriotism the Plan presented a Prospect of commercial and political Advantage". In choosing the name "Sydney" when he was raised to the peerage in 1783, Thomas Townshend demonstrated his pride in descent from the Sidney family, who had been eminent opponents of Stuart absolutism. Sydney thought of himself as a Whig, by which he meant he was opposed to any increase in the power and authority of the Royal prerogative. The name "Sydney" (with special reference to Algernon Sydney, d.1683) was a synonym in the eighteenth century political lexicon for opposition to tyranny and absolutism. It is probable that Sydney was aware of his distinguished ancestor, Algernon Sidney's characterisation of the founders of imperial Rome: “Thus we find a few Men assembling together upon the Banks of the Tiber, resolv’d to build a City, and set up a Government among themselves”. Sydney was responsible for giving the new colony a constitution and judicial system suitable for a colony of free citizens rather than a prison. Phillip's second commission of 2 April 1787 made him governor of a colony with a civil government, not of a penal settlement with a military government. The Governor's commission, together with the colony's charter of justice establishing the legal regime, brought into existence in New South Wales a colony whose inhabitants enjoyed all the rights and duties of English law, where slavery was illegal.

== Personal life ==
Sydney married Elizabeth, daughter of Richard Powys, MP, in 1760. He died in June 1800, aged 67, and was succeeded in his titles by his son, John. Sydney was buried in the Scadbury chapel in the parish church of St Nicholas's in Chislehurst in southeast London, where a large memorial tablet to him may be seen. The Viscountess Sydney died in May 1826, aged 90.

Their daughter, Mary (died 1821), married John Pitt, 2nd Earl of Chatham, but had no children. Another daughter, Henrietta, married Charles Montagu-Scott, 4th Duke of Buccleuch.

== Reputation ==
Sydney's reputation has suffered at the hands of the nationalist school of Australian historians, such as Manning Clark. In his influential A History of Australia (Melbourne University Press 1961) Clark wrote: "Mr Thomas Townshend, commonly denominated Tommy Townshend, owed his political career to a very independent fortune and a considerable parliamentary interest, which contributed to his personal no less than his political elevation, for his abilities, though respectable, scarcely rose above mediocrity." Other writers have portrayed Sydney as a cruel monster for dispatching the unfortunate convicts to the far side of the earth.

Frognal House by George Shepherd appears in Thomas Ireland's History of Kent published c. 1830.

Sydney can be described, by the standards of his time, as an enlightened and progressive politician. He did not support the American Revolution but was a strong opponent of the war which he thought was pointless and needlessly prolonged during Lord North's ministry. As Home Secretary and Foreign Secretary he was heavily involved in the development of Canada and the settling of fleeing refugees from the intolerant rebels. The city of Sydney in Nova Scotia is named after him in memory of his efforts on behalf of the loyalist settlers of Canada. In a parallel situation for the Royal Townships of the yet-to-be-formed colony of Upper Canada the thoroughfares of the United Empire Loyalist settlement of Cornwall, Ontario were, in 1784, named Pitt Street and Sydney Street in honour of the prime minister and his foreign secretary.

In 1986, preceding celebrations of the Australian Bicentenary, Sydney was honoured on a postage stamp issued by Australia Post depicting his portrait. In 1992, a monument in bronze and marble commemorating both the First Fleet and Viscount Sydney was unveiled in Sydney Square, outside Sydney Town Hall by Queen Elizabeth II.

More recently Sydney's reputation has been revisited by Australian historians. Alan Atkinson wrote in The Europeans in Australia (Oxford University Press, 1997): "Townshend was an anomaly in the British Cabinet, and his ideas were in some ways old-fashioned... He had long been interested in the way in which the empire might be a medium for British liberties, traditionally understood." He took the view that convicts should be given the chance to redeem themselves through self-government in penal colonies such as New South Wales. Governor Phillip's well-known statement that "There will be no slavery in a new country and hence no slaves" is an accurate reflection of Sydney's philosophy. Sydney's papers are held by the William L. Clements Library at the University of Michigan.

== Timeline ==
- 1733, 24 February: Born
- 1754: Entered the House of Commons as MP for Whitchurch, for 29 years until 1783
- 1756: Clerk of the household of the Prince of Wales
- 1760, 19 May: married Elizabeth Powys (b.1736 d.1826), later served as Lady of the Bedchamber to Queen Charlotte
- 1761, 21 March: one of the clerks of the board of green cloth until he resigned in Dec. 1762
- 1765, 12 July: 4th Lord of the Treasury, under Lord John Cavendish, under William Dowdeswell (Chancellor of the Exchequer), under 2nd Marquess of Rockingham (1st Lord of the Treasury and Prime minister)
- 1766, 2 August: 3rd Lord of the Treasury, under Charles Townshend (Chancellor of the Exchequer), under Duke of Grafton (1st Lord of the Treasury)
- 1767, 23 December: Paymaster of the Forces under William Pitt (The Elder), until 1768 (June)
- 1767, 23 December: became a member of the Privy Council
- 1782, 30 March: Secretary at War under Rockingham's 2nd ministry, until 10 July 1782.
- 1782, 10 July: Leader of the House of Commons, under the Earl of Shelburne's ministry, until 2 April 1783.
- 1782, 10 July: Home Secretary (and Colonial Secretary), under Shelburne ministry, until 2 April 1783
- 1783, 6 March: Created Baron Sydney and entered the House of Lords.
- 1783, 23 December: Home Secretary (and Colonial Secretary) under William Pitt (The Younger), until 5 June 1789
- 1783: Leader of the House of Lords under Pitt (The Younger), until 1789
- 1784: First President of the Board of Control over the British East India Company, until 1790
- 1784: 5 March: President of the Committee on Trade and Foreign Plantations (equiv. to Secretary of State for Trade and Industry), until 1786 (23 Aug.)
- 1785: Sydney in (Cape Breton) Nova Scotia was named after him by Col J.F.W. DesBarres.
- 1788, 26 January: Sydney Cove in NSW, Australia named after him by Governor Arthur Philip
- 1789: Elevated to 1st Viscount Sydney of Chislehurst, Kent
- 1793: Deputy Lieutenant of Kent
- During some period Thomas Townshend was also a governor of the Charter House.
- 1800, 30 June: Died at home, Frognal House

== Notes ==
Parliament of the United Kingdom
Preceded by Charles Wallop; Lord Bertie	Member of Parliament for Whitchurch; 1754–1783; With: William Powlett 1754–1757; George Jennings 1757–1768; Henry Wallop 1768–1774; The Viscount Midleton 1774–1783	Succeeded by The Viscount Midleton; William Selwyn
Political offices
Preceded by Lord North; George Cooke	Paymaster of the Forces; 1767–1768; With: George Cooke	Succeeded by Richard Rigby
Preceded by Charles Jenkinson	Secretary at War; 1782	Succeeded by Sir George Yonge
Preceded by The Earl of Shelburne	Home Secretary; 1782–1783	Succeeded by Lord North
Preceded by Charles James Fox	Leader of the House of Commons; 1782–1783	Succeeded by Lord North; Charles James Fox
Preceded by The Earl Temple	Home Secretary; 1783–1789	Succeeded by The Lord Grenville
Preceded by The Earl Temple	Leader of the House of Lords; 1783–1789	Succeeded by The Duke of Leeds
Preceded by The Lord Grantham as First Lord of Trade	President of the Committee on Trade and Foreign Plantations; 1784–1786	Succeeded by The Lord Hawkesbury as President of the Board of Trade
New office	President of the Board of Control; 1784–1790	Succeeded by The Lord Grenville
Legal offices
Preceded by The Lord Grantley	Justice in Eyre south of the Trent; 1789–1800	Succeeded by Thomas Grenville
Peerage of Great Britain
New creation	Viscount Sydney; 1789–1800	Succeeded by John Townshend
New creation	Baron Sydney; 1783–1800	Succeeded by John Townshend
