= John Pitt, 2nd Earl of Chatham =

British Army officer and politician

General The Right Honourable The Earl of Chatham KG PC
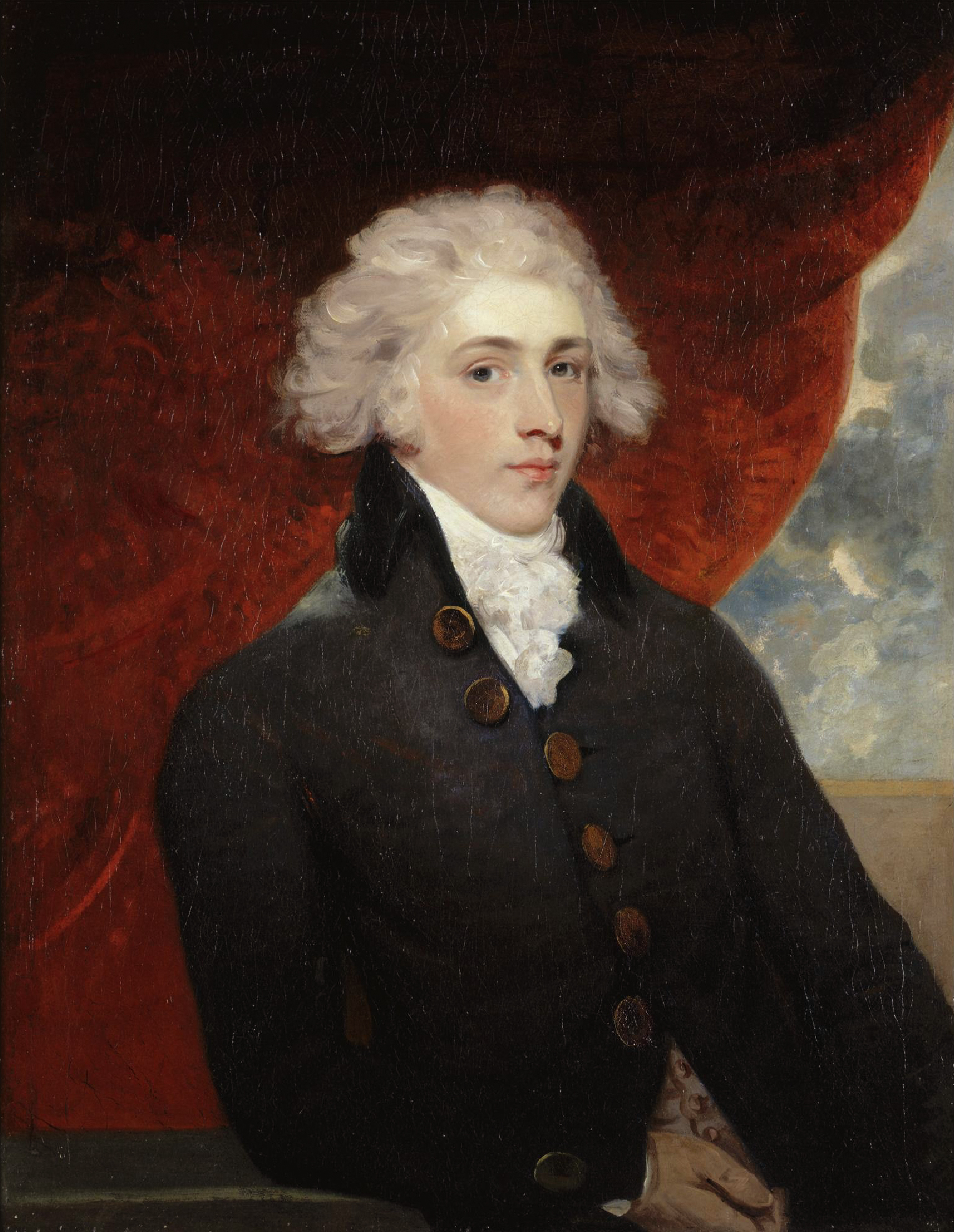
- Portrait by Martin Archer Shee, c. 1794–1795

Governor of Gibraltar
- In office 29 January 1820 – 24 February 1835
- Monarchs: George IV; William IV
- Preceded by: The Duke of Kent
- Succeeded by: Sir Alexander Woodford

Master-General of the Ordnance
- In office April 1807 – May 1810
- Prime Minister: The Duke of Portland; Spencer Perceval
- Preceded by: The Earl of Moira
- Succeeded by: The Earl of Mulgrave
- In office June 1801 – February 1806
- Prime Minister: William Pitt the Younger; Henry Addington
- Preceded by: The Marquess Cornwallis
- Succeeded by: The Earl of Moira

Lord President of the Council
- In office 21 September 1796 – 30 July 1801
- Prime Minister: William Pitt the Younger
- Preceded by: The Earl of Mansfield
- Succeeded by: The Duke of Portland

Lord Privy Seal
- In office 16 July 1794 – 14 February 1798
- Prime Minister: William Pitt the Younger
- Preceded by: The Earl Spencer
- Succeeded by: The Earl of Westmorland

First Lord of the Admiralty
- In office July 1788 – December 1794
- Prime Minister: William Pitt the Younger
- Preceded by: The Earl Howe
- Succeeded by: The Earl Spencer

Personal details
- Born: 9 October 1756 Hayes, Kent
- Died: 24 September 1835 (aged 78) London, England
- Party: Tory
- Spouse: Mary Elizabeth Townshend (m. 1783; died 1821)
- Parents: William Pitt, 1st Earl of Chatham; Hester Grenville
- Relatives: Pitt family
- Awards: Order of the Garter

Military service
- Allegiance: Great Britain; United Kingdom
- Branch/service: British Army
- Years of service: 1774–1835
- Rank: General
- Battles/wars: American Revolutionary War; French Revolutionary Wars; Anglo-Russian invasion of Holland; Napoleonic Wars; Walcheren Campaign

General John Pitt, 2nd Earl of Chatham (9 October 1756 – 24 September 1835) was a British Army officer and politician. He spent a lengthy period in the cabinet but is best known for commanding the disastrous Walcheren Campaign of 1809.

Chatham was the eldest son of William Pitt, 1st Earl of Chatham. He was two and a half years older than his famous brother William Pitt the Younger, the future prime minister. After serving as a junior officer in the American War of Independence, he succeeded his father as Earl of Chatham in 1778. Politically he was a close supporter of his brother during the following decade, leading to his appointment as First Lord of the Admiralty in 1788. Despite overseeing the Royal Navy's victory at the Glorious First of June in 1794, he faced criticism for his handling of the Admiralty and was demoted to the comparatively unimportant post of Lord Privy Seal. Although he continued to serve in William's cabinet, the relationship between the two brothers never fully recovered after this point.

After serving in the 1799 Helder Campaign, he was promoted to be Master General of the Ordnance in 1801. This became a key role in the next few years when a French invasion appeared imminent, and he helped oversee Britain's defences including the construction of a series of martello towers. He grew increasingly independent from his brother and did not resign from the cabinet when William Pitt left office in 1801. He held this post under Henry Addington and when his brother returned to office again in 1804. Following his brother's death in 1806, he briefly went into opposition against the Ministry of All the Talents before returning as Master General in the new Tory government of 1807. He also continued his military career, being promoted to lieutenant general and appointed to several commands in charge of home defence.

Considered on at least two occasions as a possible prime minister, Chatham rejected these approaches due to poor health of his wife. He also turned down the prospect of commanding British troops in Portugal in 1808 at the beginning of the Peninsular War, a command that instead went to Arthur Wellesley. In 1809 he did accept command of an expedition to the island of Walcheren, as part of a plan to strike at a French fleet being assembled in nearby Antwerp. Despite overseeing the largest force Britain had despatched abroad during the war, the expedition became bogged down on the island and began suffering heavy casualty rates due to disease. Chatham was recalled and was subject to an inquiry that largely placed the blame on him.

After a number of years in the political wilderness, in 1820 Chatham was made Governor of Gibraltar. Although Europe was at peace by this time, Gibraltar remained a key strategic post, and he oversaw improvements to the defences while also dealing with a difficult diplomatic relationship with neighbouring Spain which was going through a period of political turbulence.

== Early life ==
John Pitt was born on 9 October 1756 at Hayes Place in Kent, the home of his father William Pitt. He was the second child and eldest son of Pitt and his wife Hester Grenville. In his early years, his father was Secretary of State at the height of the Seven Years' War, winning great popularity with the public due to a string of victories over the French – particularly during the Annus Mirabilis of 1759 – until his dramatic resignation in 1761. At the age of five, John became heir to a peerage when his mother was made Baroness Chatham. In 1766 his father returned to office as Prime Minister, taking the title of Earl of Chatham which John also became heir to styled as Viscount Pitt.

As a child he was often in poor health, suffering frequent fevers. His parents chose not to send him to Eton, which his father had hated. Instead, he was educated at the family homes in Hayes and Burton Pynsent in Somerset by a tutor. By 1761 he had four siblings, two sisters Hester and Harriet and two brothers William and James. He was emotionally very close to his brothers and disliked whenever he was separated from them. He grew up to be something of a dandy in his dress and greatly enjoyed hunting. Already, however, despite his natural intelligence, he was beginning to show signs of laziness that were later to be sharply criticised during his political career. To the delight of his father, Pitt began showing interest in pursuing a military career.

== Early career ==
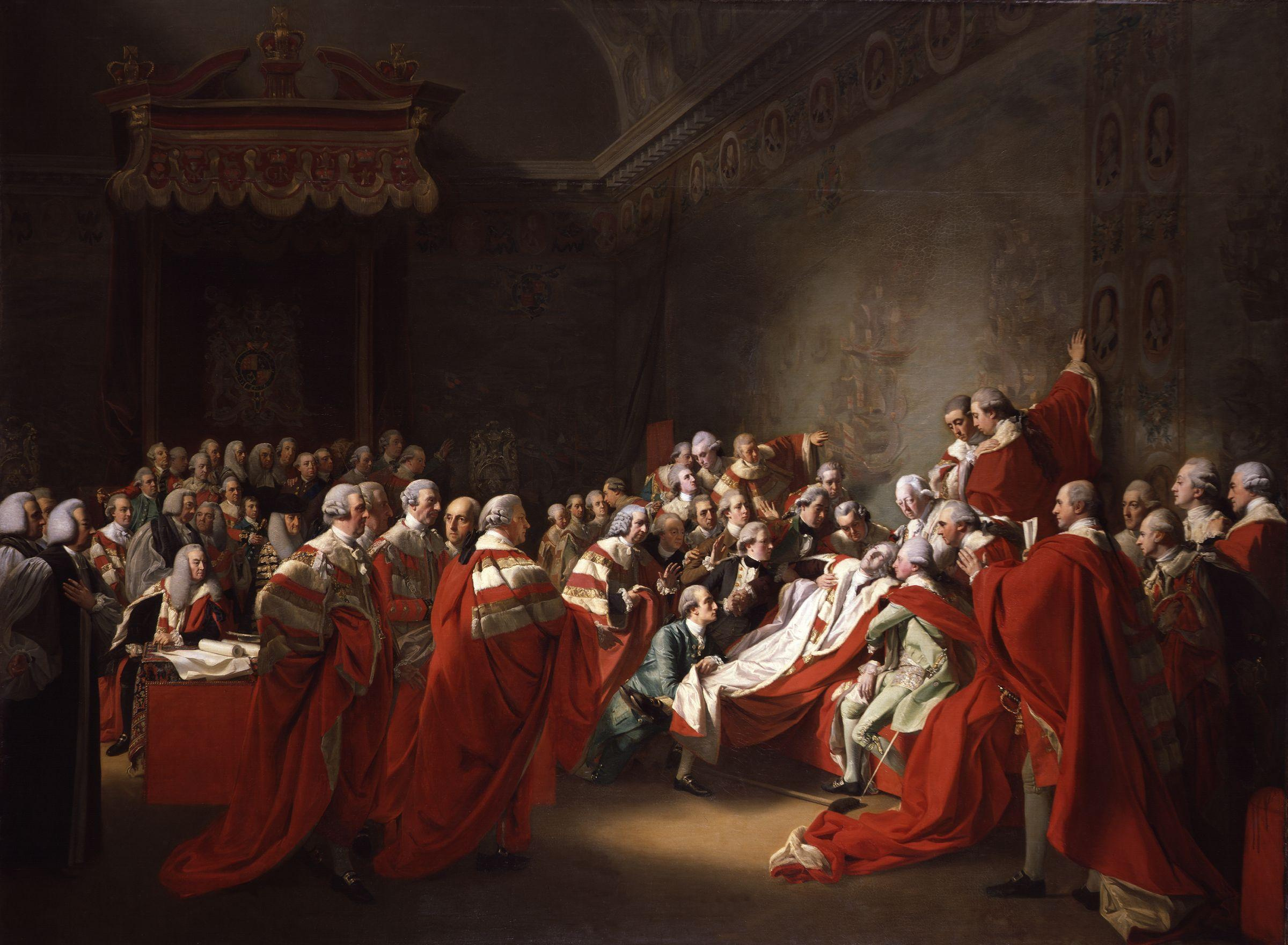
The Death of the Earl of Chatham; Pitt is shown in military uniform to his father's left.

Chatham joined the British Army as an ensign in the 47th Regiment of Foot on 14 March 1774. He served as aide-de-camp to General Guy Carleton in Quebec, where they made preparations to resist a planned invasion by American forces. In October 1775 he departed for London carrying dispatches, missing the Battle of Quebec that took place at the end of the year where Carleton successfully defended the city.

Back in Britain, under strong family pressure, Pitt resigned his commission in early 1776 in protest against the war with America, to which his father was vehemently opposed. He became effective head of the family due to his father's ill health, and took an increasing interest in politics. It was rumoured, at one point, that he might stand for Parliament for Westminster.

He only returned to the army in March 1778, this time as a lieutenant in the 39th Foot. France had entered the American War of Independence the previous month, meaning that he was now able to serve without fighting against the Americans. He was due to sail to Gibraltar as aide-de-camp to the lieutenant governor, Colonel Robert Boyd. On 7 April he and his younger brothers were in attendance when their father rose in the House of Lords to give a speech, in which he called for defiance against the French. Shortly after finishing his speech, their father collapsed and died a few weeks later. In John Singleton Copley's painting The Death of the Earl of Chatham, Pitt is portrayed in military uniform at his father's side. His father's last words at Hayes were reputedly "Leave your dying father, and go to the defence of your country".

Having succeeded to the Earldom, Chatham spent the following year in Gibraltar before transferring to the West Indies with a newly raised regiment, the 86th Foot. By the end of 1781 he was back in Britain and in 1782 obtained a Captaincy in the London-based 3rd Regiment of Foot Guards. Although he was appointed colonel in October 1793 and major general in February 1795, Chatham does not appear to have undertaken any military duties for nearly fifteen years after the end of the War of American Independence in 1783.

== Political career ==
=== Member of Parliament ===
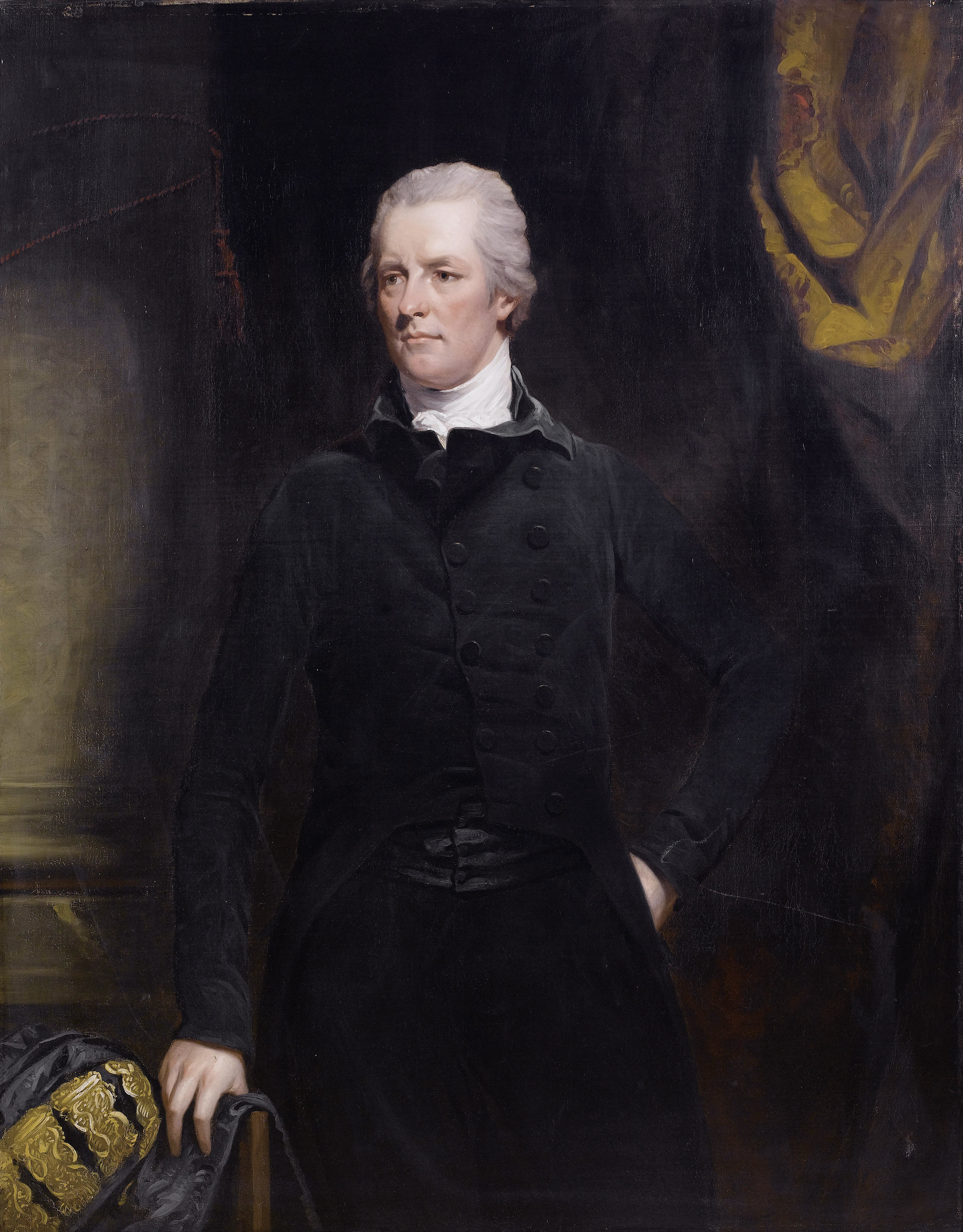
Chatham's younger brother William Pitt the Younger, whose political career eclipsed him

For much of the 1780s and 1790s Chatham focused on a political career. As heir to his father, he was poised to be a natural leader of his political supporters, the Chathamites. However, during the years that Chatham had devoted to his military career these followers were led by Lord Shelburne and then, increasingly, by Chatham's younger brother. Known as William Pitt the Younger, to distinguish him from his father, he had entered Parliament in 1781 and the following year became Chancellor of the Exchequer. By the time Chatham returned permanently to Britain, his brother was already the dominant political figure in the family. Their youngest brother James, a Royal Navy officer, died from fever in Antigua in 1780.

Already Chatham was struggling with debt, despite his inheritance, due both to his own overspending and the poor state their father had left the family finances in. Chatham often gambled and became involved in horsebreeding and racing, which turned into expensive pursuits for him. In July 1783, he married Mary, the second daughter of Thomas Townshend who had been a political ally of his father. It was a love match, rather than an arranged marriage. Mary was known as attractive and very fashionable in society, although she was to suffer from physical and mental illness throughout their marriage.

Chatham joined with Pitt and Shelburne to oppose the Fox–North coalition of 1783 but generally kept a low profile during these years. Pitt became prime minister in December 1783. Chatham supported his brother in the Lords but did not take office. In February 1784 on the way back from an event in the City of London, the brothers were attacked by a mob likely organised by supporters of their rival Charles James Fox. In the subsequent 1784 general election Pitt won a decisive victory, securing his government's future. Due to his wife's severe illness, Chatham did not consider himself able to join his brother's government for the next few years, despite rumours linking him to various posts.

=== First Lord of the Admiralty ===
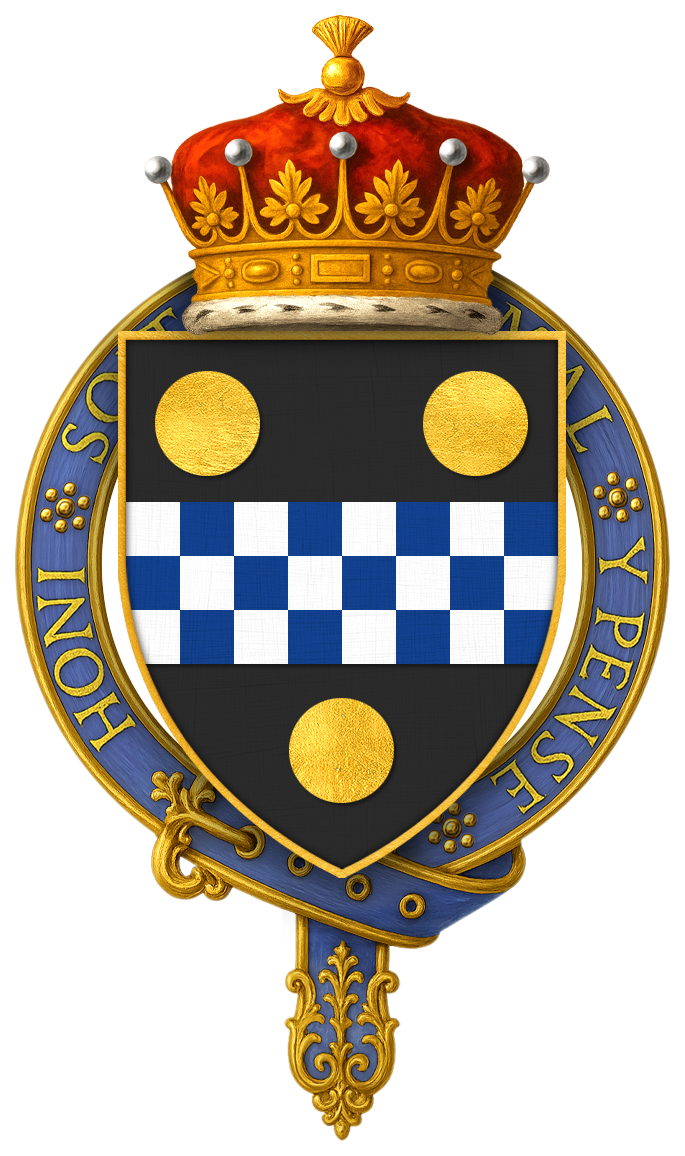
Chatham's coat of arms

In July 1788 William offered Chatham the cabinet post of First Lord of the Admiralty. 'I have had my doubts whether the public may not think this too much like monopoly,' Pitt confessed, 'but that doubt is not sufficient to counterbalance the personal comfort which will result from it and the general advantage to the whole of our system'.

Pitt's cousin, William Wyndham Grenville, explained the reason for the appointment in more detail: Chatham would connect 'the department of the Admiralty with the rest of the administration, which has never yet been the case under Pitt's government, even in the smallest degree'.

In 1790, Chatham oversaw the mobilisation of the navy during the Nookta Sound Crisis with Spain. In gratitude for the successful resolution of the crisis in Britain's favour, George III wanted to award the Order of the Garter to the Prime Minister. Pitt declined the offer but suggested it be awarded to his brother instead. Chatham accepted the honour, and was immensely proud of it, incorporating the image into the design of his crest, which featured on his carriage and cutlery.

Generally, Chatham's tenure as First Lord of the Admiralty was not especially distinguished. Important reforms were shelved and Chatham soon acquired a reputation for disorganisation and laziness. Contemporaries noted 'the inconvenience attending his laying in bed till the day is advanced, as officers &c were kept waiting'.

During the first major campaign of the French Revolutionary Wars Chatham's Admiralty was blamed in part for the failure of the Siege of Dunkirk in 1793. Due to miscommunication between the Board of Ordnance and the Admiralty, the ships carrying siege weaponry and supplies for the besieging forces arrived two weeks late. Although in this instance Chatham does not seem to have been guilty of any neglect, his reputation was fatally compromised. A further disappointment took place during the Siege of Toulon, in which the Allies suffered a defeat. It was around this time that he earned his nickname of 'the late Lord Chatham' due to his unpunctuality.

The Admiralty was also criticised in the national press for the failure of the Royal Navy to engage in a major fleet engagement against the French during the opening months of the war until the Glorious First of June in 1794. Even this was an ambivalent victory for Chatham, as the victorious British had been unable to prevent a major convoy arriving in France from West Indies, undermining the blockade. Chatham had grown increasingly frustrated by the interference at the Admiralty by colleagues, particularly Henry Dundas.

=== Demotion ===
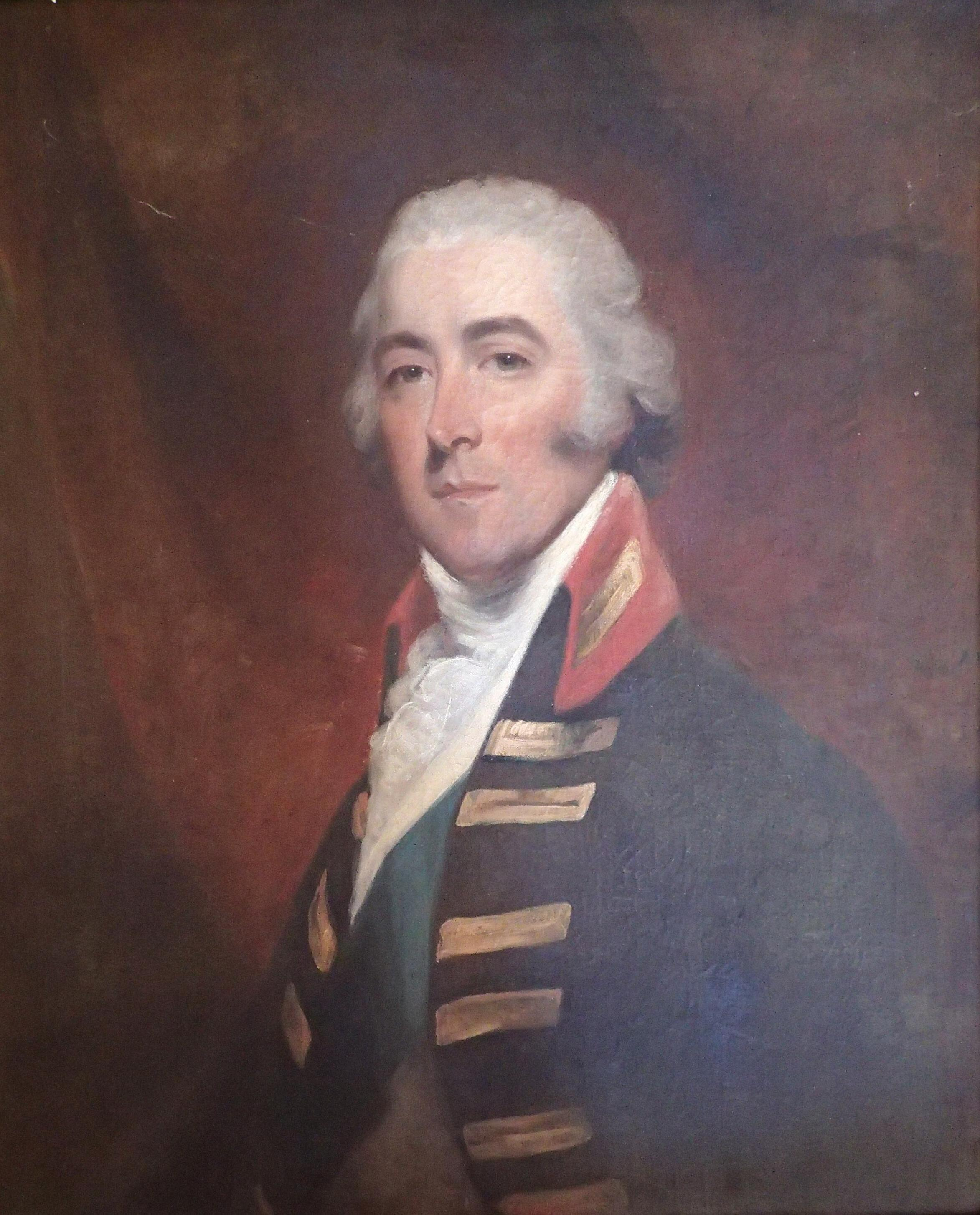
c. 1799 portrait of Chatham by the studio of John Hoppner

Chatham had become a magnet for criticism of the government, something which his relationship to the Prime Minister did not help. After a further disagreement between Chatham and Dundas, Pitt was forced to choose between them. Dundas has become a trusted ally and advisor, and the Prime Minister chose to back him rather than his brother. In December 1794 Pitt finally responded to pressure and moved his brother to the less responsible post of Lord Privy Seal. He chose to demote Chatham by letter rather than in person as this "must be unnecessarily distressing to us both". Chatham was furious about his dismissal and demanded to see Pitt in person, which eventually the Prime Minister reluctantly agreed to. Their meeting was not productive and Chatham considered refusing his new office, shattering the image of unity in the cabinet that Pitt wanted to project. Eventually, Pitt persuaded the King to make the offer directly which Chatham reluctantly accepted. He believed that it would be thought that he had been removed from the Admiralty because the government had no confidence in his management of it. He was replaced by Lord Spencer. As he feared, almost immediately the opposition did launch attacks in the Commons on his alleged mismanagement.

After losing the Admiralty, Chatham's relationship with his brother never fully recovered. Two years later Chatham was promoted to Lord President of the Council. Although he was tempted to reject the offer, he accepted what was intended as an olive branch by Pitt. The two publicly reconciled and Chatham visited Pitt at Holwood. Nonetheless, there was a lack of the old warmth between them, and Chatham increasingly took an independent line in the cabinet where he had previously been a close supporter of Pitt.

=== Defence of Britain ===
Here he stayed, remaining in office after Pitt's resignation under Henry Addington, until a cabinet reshuffle in June 1801 moved him to the post of Master-General of the Ordnance. He continued in this post until May 1810, with only a short interval out of office in 1806–1807. He became the General Officer in Command of the Eastern District in 1806. Following the breakdown of the Peace of Amiens in 1803, the prospect of a French invasion of Britain by Napoleon's Grande Armée seemed imminent. Chatham was closely involved in preparing Britain's defences, particularly at likely landing points along the south coast of England.

A major defensive innovation of the period was the Martello tower, which British troops had first encountered in Corsica.

== Later military career ==
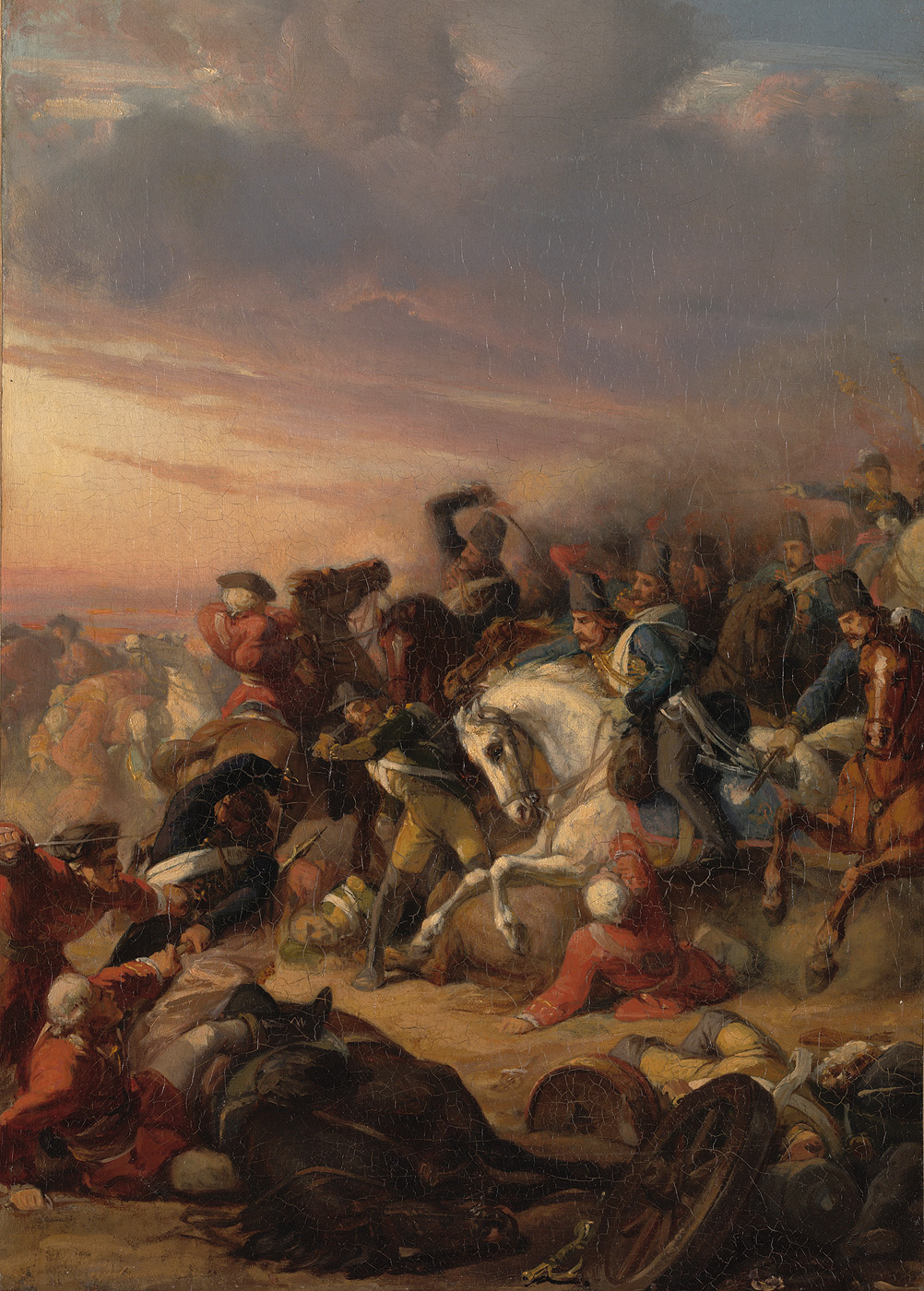
The Battle of Castricum, where Chatham was wounded

In 1798 Chatham returned to the army. He was appointed to command a brigade in the Helder campaign in 1799. This was an expedition sent by Britain to the Batavian Republic, one of several attempts by Britain to liberate the Low Countries during the war. Commanded by the Duke of York, a younger son of the King, the British struggled to co-operate with their Russian allies and faced unexpectedly heavy French resistance. He was wounded by a spent ball at the Battle of Castricum on 6 October. The Allied forces were evacuated following the Convention of Alkmaar. After this he served as commander of various military districts, but for some reason was passed over in favour of Arthur Wellesley for a command in the Peninsular War.

== Walcheren ==
=== Campaign ===
In May 1809 the Secretary of State for War, Lord Castlereagh, offered Chatham the command of an amphibious assault aimed at destroying the French fleet and fortifications around Antwerp and the island of Walcheren. Chatham commanded the largest expeditionary force Britain had yet fielded in the war. Despite early success in taking the town of Flushing, the campaign was an unmitigated disaster. The army made slow headway and the French immediately withdrew their fleet to Antwerp, a tactic that should have been foreseen by the politicians, admirals and generals planning the campaign from the start. While Chatham quarrelled with the naval commander, Sir Richard Strachan, as many as 8,000 British troops succumbed to malaria and other diseases.

=== Inquiry ===
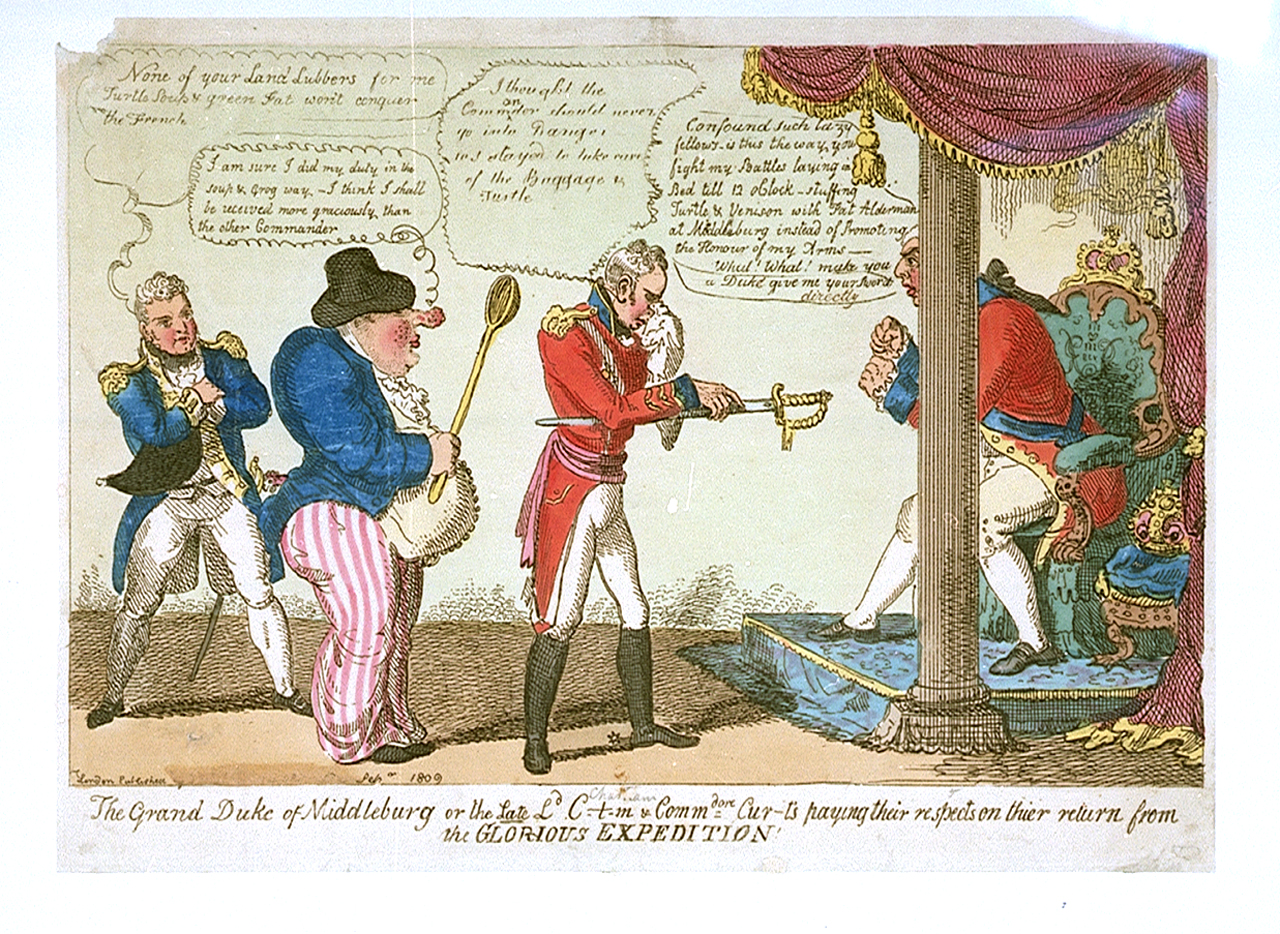
Cartoon mocking the Walcheren Campaign's failure; Chatham is shown crying and handing his sword to George III

Chatham was recalled in disgrace. His appearance before a parliamentary enquiry did him no favours, particularly when it emerged that he had presented the King with a private memorandum which ought to have gone to the Secretary of State for War first. Spencer Perceval's government withdrew its support from Chatham and he was forced to resign from the Ordnance in May 1810.

Chatham's political and military reputation was ruined. A poem circulated making fun of his inactivity and the lack of co-operation between the army and navy:

The Earl of Chatham, with his sword drawn,
Stood waiting for Sir Richard Strachan;
Sir Richard, longing to be at 'em,
Stood waiting for the Earl of Chatham.

== Later life ==
Chatham did not serve actively again but was promoted to full General in January 1812. He continued to hold various ceremonial positions such as Lieutenant Governor of Jersey and High Steward of Colchester to which he had been appointed back in 1807. He prepared a dossier, outlining a defence of his actions during the Walcheren campaign.

During these years Arthur Wellesley made a great success of the command that Chatham had turned down, leading Allied forces to victory in the Peninsular War and invading southern France. Rewarded with a Dukedom, he became Britain's premier military commander and oversaw the Allied victory at the Battle of Waterloo in 1815, with Chatham playing no part in any of these campaigns.

=== Gibraltar ===
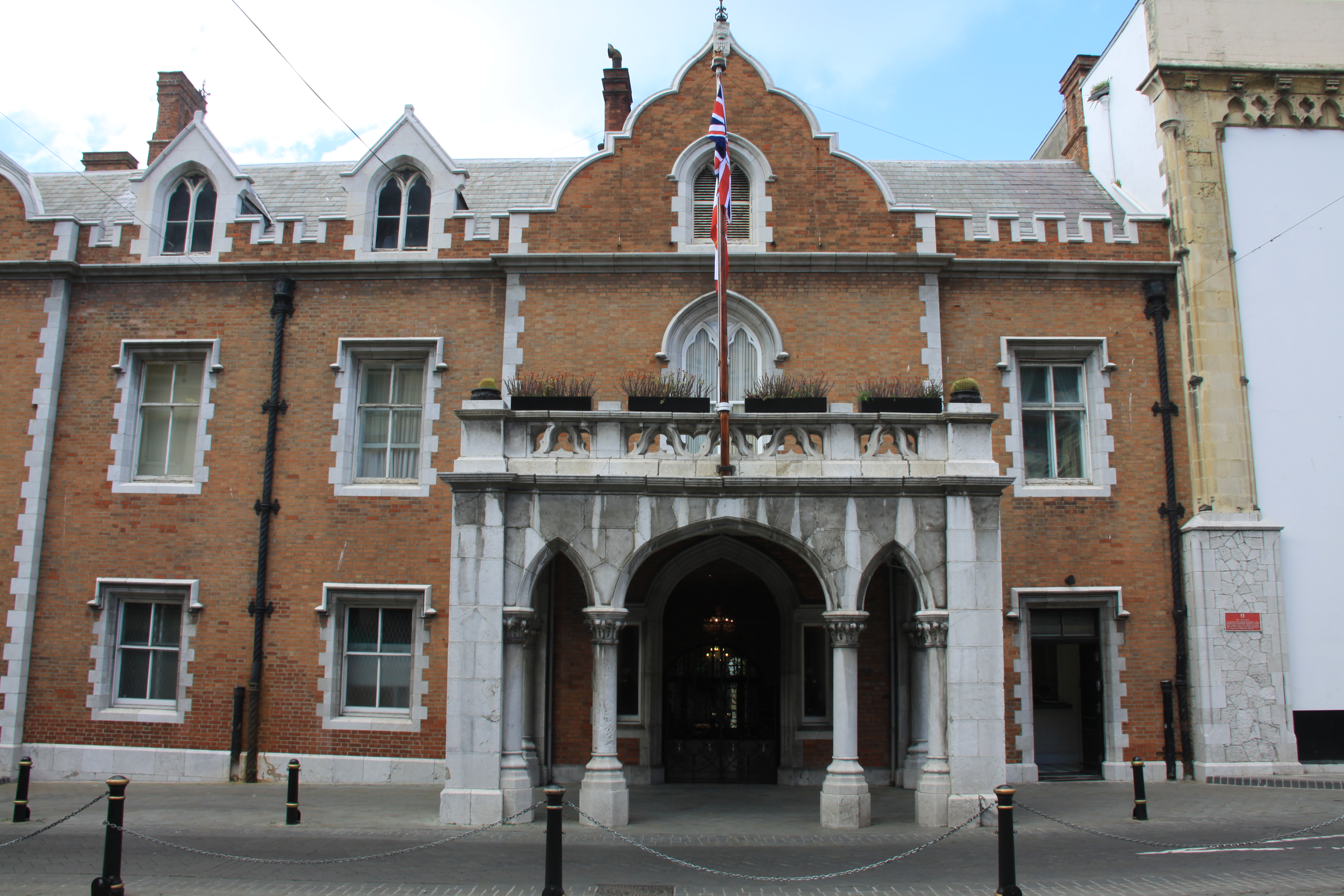
The Convent, Gibraltar, the governor's official residence. In 1820 Chatham's career was revived when he was made governor, formally holding the position until 1835.

In 1820 he succeeded Duke of Kent as Governor of Gibraltar. His predecessor, the father of the future Queen Victoria, had not been on the Rock since a mutiny among his troops in 1803 and a series of acting Governors had performed duties on his behalf. Since 1814 this role had been performed by Sir George Don. Chatham initially intended to also hold the post in absence, but following political pressure from the opposition he agreed to take personal command in Gibraltar. After a long illness his wife died in May 1821, and he finally sailed for the Mediterranean that October.

It was more than forty years since Chatham had last visited Gibraltar as a junior officer. During that time it had survived a major Franco-Spanish siege and the civilian population had grown rapidly to over 13,000 living alongside a 4,000-strong garrison. Sir George Don, who had been acting command of the garrison for seven years, continued to serve as lieutenant governor under Chatham, and the two men enjoyed a good relationship. He took over his post at a time when neighbouring Spain was undergoing severe turbulence as Ferdinand VII was challenged by Spanish Liberal opponents.

He died at his house in Charles Street, London, on 24 September 1835, aged 78.

== Family ==
Chatham married The Hon. Mary Elizabeth Townshend, daughter of the 1st Baron Sydney, on 10 July 1783. The couple had no children. Lady Chatham died on 21 May 1821. Chatham did not remarry and on his death the Earldom of Chatham became extinct.

== Legacy ==
John Pitt was the namesake of Lord Chatham Island in the Galapagos, now San Cristobal. The name was bestowed by Captain James Colnett in 1793 while Pitt was still first lord of the Admiralty.

== Arms ==
Coat of arms of John Pitt, 2nd Earl of Chatham
Crest A stork proper beaked and membered or, resting the dexter claw on an anchor erect cabled or. Escutcheon Sable, a fess chequy argent and azure between three bezants. Supporters Dexter, A lion rampant guardant proper charged on the shoulder with an acorn or, slipped and leaved vert. Sinister, A buck proper attired, collared and chained or. Motto Benigno numine (By Divine Providence) Orders The Most Noble Order of the Garter - Knight Companion (KG).

Political offices
Preceded by The Viscount Howe	First Lord of the Admiralty; 1788–1794	Succeeded by The Earl Spencer
Preceded by The Earl Spencer	Lord Privy Seal; 1794–1798	Succeeded by The Earl of Westmorland
Preceded by The Earl of Mansfield	Lord President of the Council; 1796–1801	Succeeded by The Duke of Portland
Military offices
Preceded by The Marquess Cornwallis	Master-General of the Ordnance; 1801–1806	Succeeded by The Earl of Moira
Preceded by Lord George Lennox	Governor of Plymouth; 1805–1807	Succeeded by The Viscount Lake
Preceded by The Earl of Moira	Master-General of the Ordnance; 1807–1810	Succeeded by The Lord Mulgrave
Preceded by George Morrison	Colonel of the 4th (The King's Own) Regiment of Foot; 1799–1835	Succeeded by John Hodgson
Government offices
Preceded by The Marquess Townshend	Governor of Jersey; 1807–1821	Succeeded by The Viscount Beresford
Preceded by Sir George Don (acting)	Governor of Gibraltar; 1820–1825	Succeeded by Sir George Don (acting)
Peerage of Great Britain
Preceded by William Pitt	Earl of Chatham; 1778–1835	Extinct
Preceded by Hester Pitt	Baron Chatham; 1803–1835	Extinct
