= Henry Somerset, 1st Marquess of Worcester =

English aristocrat

The Most Honourable The Marquess of Worcester
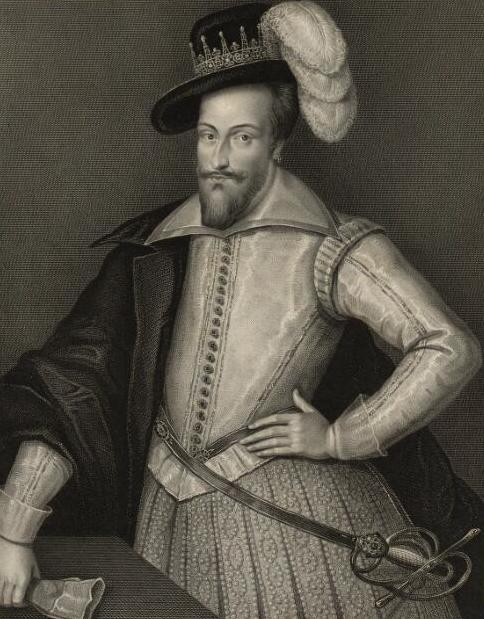
- Born: 1577
- Died: 18 December 1646 (aged 68–69)
- Noble family: House of Somerset
- Spouse: Hon. Anne Russell
- Issue: Edward Somerset, 2nd Marquess of Worcester
- Father: Edward Somerset, 4th Earl of Worcester
- Mother: Elizabeth Hastings, Countess of Worcester

Henry Somerset, 1st Marquess of Worcester (1577 – 18 December 1646) was an English aristocrat, a prominent and financially important Royalist during the early years of the English Civil War.

== Life ==
He was the son of Edward Somerset, 4th Earl of Worcester and Elizabeth Hastings. On 3 March 1628, he succeeded his father and became the 5th Earl of Worcester.

Brought up a Protestant, he converted to Catholicism as a young man. He was considered an outstandingly wealthy peer, with an income, by the contemporary estimate of Richard Symonds, of £24,000 per annum. By good management, as well as by inheritance and marriage, he built up major holdings in property. When war came, he claimed to have expended and lent over £900,000 to the royalist cause.

Charles I asked him to keep a low profile in public life. Some noted recusants, such as Gwilym Puw and his chaplain Thomas Bayly, gathered around him at Raglan Castle. His local support was increased by the fact that he was not identified as a courtier. For his financial support of King Charles I at the outset of the First English Civil War, he was created 1st Marquess of Worcester, on 2 November 1642.

After the battle of Naseby, King Charles sought refuge at Raglan, in the period June to September 1645. The next year, the Marquess was forced to surrender Raglan Castle to the forces of Sir Thomas Morgan, 1st Baronet, late in 1646, marking the effective end of the Civil War in Wales. He was taken into custody by the Parliamentary forces, and died in Covent Garden, on 18 December 1646.

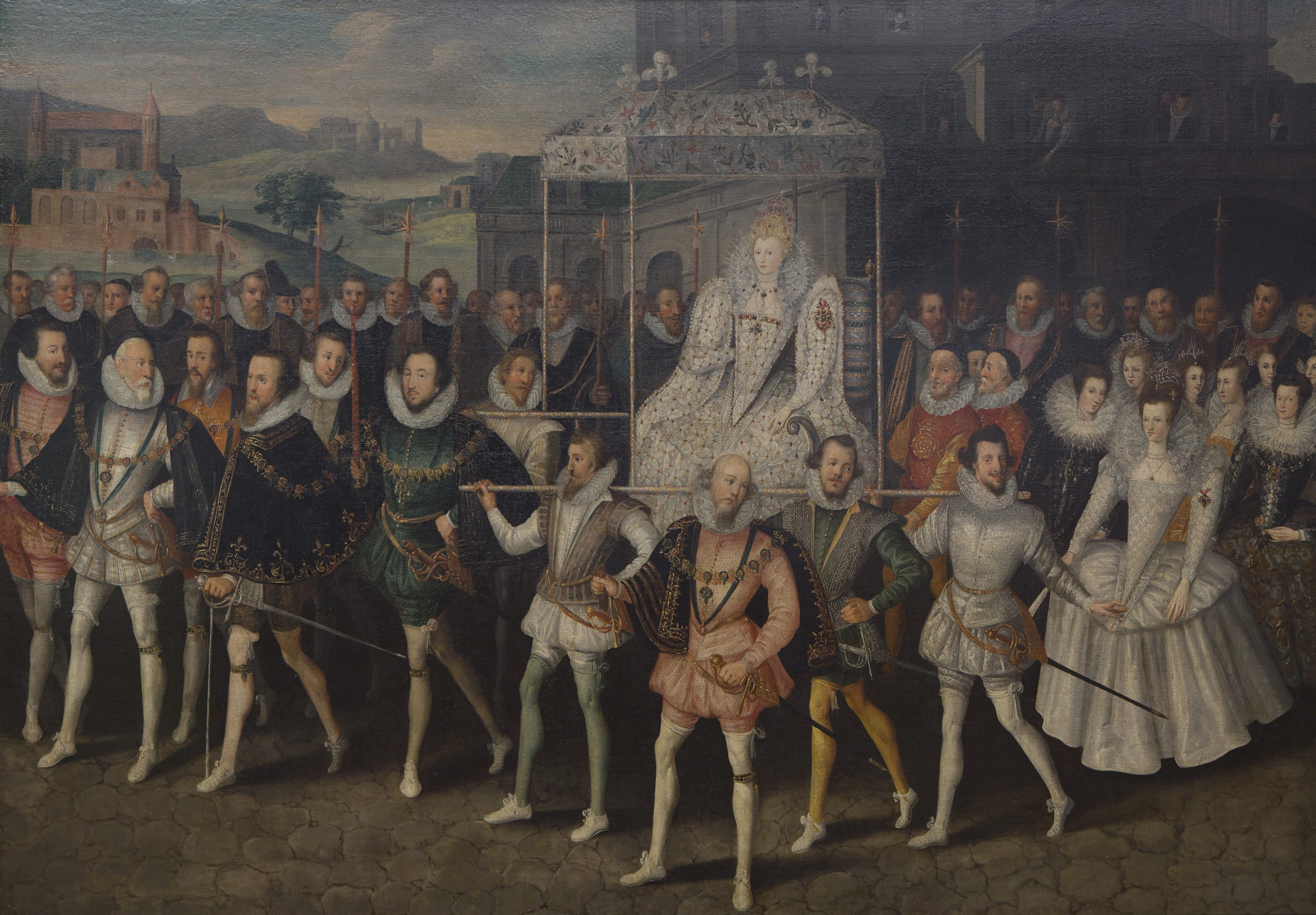
Queen Elizabeth in procession to Blackfriars on her way to the wedding of Anne Russell and Lord Herbert at Blackfriars, by Robert Peake the Elder circa. 1600

== Family ==
On 16 June 1600 he married Anne Russell, a daughter of John Russell, Baron Russell (eldest son and heir apparent of Francis Russell, 2nd Earl of Bedford) by his wife Elizabeth Cooke. The wedding procession with Queen Elizabeth I in a litter is depicted in a painting by Robert Peake the Elder. Afterwards there was a feast and a masque, a 'strange dance newly invented' performed by eight women dressed in silver skirts and gold waistcoats led by Mary Fitton. The others masque dancers were "Lady Dougherty" (Dorothy Hastings), Mistress Carey, Mistress Onslow, Mistress Southwell, Bess Russell, Mistress Darcy, and Blanche Somerset. The queen herself joined the dance.

Anne's paternal grandparents were Francis Russell, 2nd Earl of Bedford and his wife Margaret St. John. Anne's maternal grandparents were Sir Anthony Cooke and his wife Anne FitzWilliam. A splendid portrait of Anne Russell painted shortly after her marriage sold for 297,000 GBP at Sotheby's London on 2 May 2018. Anne, Countess of Worcester, died at Worcester House on the Strand on 8 April 1639. She was buried at Raglan.

With his wife, he had nine sons and four daughters including, Edward Somerset, 2nd Marquess of Worcester, his heir and successor, and Thomas Somerset, his second son, who became a Catholic priest in Rome before joining the Oratory of St Philip Neri in Perugia before Pope Clement IX sent him to England as his internuncio. Fr Thomas died in exile in Dunkirk on 30 August 1678. Another son was Sir John Somerset, of Pauntley, Gloucestershire, who married Mary Arundell, a daughter of the 1st Baron Arundell of Wardour, co. Wiltshire by his second wife. His youngest daughter, Elizabeth, married Francis Browne, 3rd Viscount Montagu.

== Ancestry ==
Ancestors of Henry Somerset, 1st Marquess of Worcester

8. Henry Somerset, 2nd Earl of Worcester
4. William Somerset, 3rd Earl of Worcester
9. Elizabeth Browne
2. Edward Somerset, 4th Earl of Worcester
10. Edward North, 1st Baron North
5. Christian North
11. Alice Squire
1. Henry Somerset, 1st Marquess of Worcester
12. George Hastings, 1st Earl of Huntingdon
6. Francis Hastings, 2nd Earl of Huntingdon
13. Anne Stafford
3. Elizabeth Hastings
14. Henry Pole, 11th Baron Montacute
7. Catherine Pole
15. Jane Neville

== Notes ==
Political offices
Preceded by The Earl of Worcester	Lord Lieutenant of Glamorgan and Monmouthshire jointly with The Earl of Worcester 1626–1628; 1626–1629	Succeeded by The Earl of Northampton
Peerage of England
New creation	Marquess of Worcester; 1642–1646	Succeeded by Edward Somerset
Preceded by Edward Somerset	Earl of Worcester; 1628–1646	Succeeded by Edward Somerset
Preceded by Edward Somerset	Baron Herbert (writ in acceleration); 1604–1646	Succeeded by Edward Somerset
