= Richard Devereux (died 1547) =

English noble

- Born: c. 1513
- Died: 1547
- Spouse: Dorothea Hastings
- Issue: Walter Devereux, 1st Earl of Essex; Elizabeth Devereux; Sir George Devereux; Ann Devereux
- Father: Walter Devereux, 1st Viscount Hereford
- Mother: Mary Grey

Sir Richard Devereux was a rising political figure during the reign of Henry VIII and Edward VI when his career was cut short by his sudden death during the life of his father. His son would complete the family's ascendency when he was created Earl of Essex.

== Family ==
He was born by 1513, the son of Walter Devereux, 1st Viscount Hereford and Mary Grey (1491-22 February 1538).

His paternal grandparents were John Devereux, 9th Baron Ferrers of Chartley and Cecily Bourchier. His maternal grandparents were Thomas Grey, 1st Marquess of Dorset and his second wife Cecily Bonville, Baroness Harington and Bonville.

== Career ==
Richard Devereux lived in Carmarthen, Wales where he was Bailiff from 1534 to 1535, and Mayor in 1536 to 1537. He was Commissioner for the tenths of spiritualities for St. David's diocese in 1535. He later came out strongly for the canons in their dispute with Bishop Barlow of St. David's. In 1542 he was a candidate for election to Parliament, and noted for enlivening the town of Carmarthen by his encouragement of unruly behaviour and resort to force, which prompted his adversary to lodge a complaint. Later in 1546 Devereux would be examined by the Privy Council for comments on religious practices he thought were superstitious.

He was Deputy steward of the lordships of Arwystli and Cyfeiliog in Montgomeryshire in 1537. He supported his father in his dispute with the 2nd Earl of Worcester, and the borough of New Carmarthen.

In 1543 he served under Sir John Wallop when he led a small force to help the Emperor Charles V in his invasion of France. He was mentioned in a dispatch on this campaign.

Devereux was Deputy justice and chamberlain of South Wales during the reign of Henry VIII. He was justice of peace for Cardiff and Pembrokeshire in 1543, and Gloucester and Monmouthshire in 1547. He was Custos Rotulorum of Carmarthenshire from 1543 until his death in 1547.

Richard Devereux was created a Knight of the Bath on 20 February 1547 at the coronation of Edward VI. Later that year he was made a member of the council in the marches of Wales.

== Parliament ==
He was elected to Parliament for Carmarthenshire in 1545, and again just prior to his death in 1547.

== Marriage and Children ==
He married Dorothea Hastings on 1 July 1536, a daughter of George Hastings, 1st Earl of Huntingdon and Anne Stafford.

They had children:

- Walter Devereux, 1st Earl of Essex
- Elizabeth Devereux. She married Sir John Vernon of Hodnet; maternal grandparents of Thomas Wriothesley, 4th Earl of Southampton.
- Sir George Devereux
- Ann Devereux. She married Henry Clifford.

== Death ==
He died on 13 October 1547. He was buried in the parish church of St. Olave Hart Street, London under the inscription 'Richarde Deuereux, sonne and Heyre to the lord Ferrers of Chartley'. His inquisition post-mortem in July 1548 showed possession of Lamphey which was to be held by his wife in her widowhood, and then to his son, George, for life with remainder to his other son, Walter. He also was possessed of the ancestral Devereux manor of Bodenham, Herefordshire.

== General Biographical References ==
- Brydges, Egerton. Collins's Peerage of England, Genealogical, Biographical, and Historical in 9 Volumes. (London: Rivington, 1812). Volume 1, Page 6 & 7
- Cokayne, G.C. Complete Baronetage. (New York; St. Martin's Press, 1984). Volume V, page 326 to 333, Ferrers
- Devereux, Walter Bourchier. “Lives and Letters of the Devereux, Earls of Essex.” (London:J Murray, 1853)
- Edwards, P.S. Devereux, Richard (by 1513–47), of Carmarthen, Carm. And Lamphey, Pemb. The History of Parliament, British Political, Social & Local History. . Retrieved 21 July 2014.
- Doyle, James E. "The Official Baronage of England." (London: Longmans, Green, and Co, 1886). Volume 1, page 167.
- Mosely, Charles (editor). Burke’s Peerage & Baronetage, 106th Edition. (Switzerland: Burke’s Peerage Genealogical Books, 1999). Volume 1, page 1378
