= William Devereux (MP) =

Sir William Devereux (c. 1525-1579) was an English landowner and MP.

== Biography ==
William was the younger son of Walter Devereux, 1st Viscount Hereford and his first wife Mary Grey. He was probably born at Ludlow, where his father was steward of Princess Mary's household, or at one of his father's properties in South Wales.

As a result of his family's local standing, he was chosen to sit for Cardiganshire in the parliament of 1547. During this parliament his father granted him an interest in the house and site of Merevale Abbey, leading him to establish himself in Warwickshire.

He sat for Staffordshire in the parliament of March 1553, apparently following a contested election.

Following the execution of his maternal uncle Henry Grey, Duke of Suffolk, he purchased from the Crown his forfeited manor of Atherstone, Warws.

He was knighted at Kenilworth Castle on 21 August 1565, during the royal progress.

He sat for Warwickshire in the parliament of 1572, but is not recorded as having sat on any committees. In 1573 the Free Grammar School at Atherstone, for which he had obtained the licence and helped to endow, was established. He died in September 1579.

He married Jane, daughter of John Scudamore of Holme Lacy, Herefordshire. and widow of John Warnecombe (d. 1552) of Lugwardine, Herefordshire. They had 2 daughters:

- Margaret married Edward, eldest son of Edward Littleton of Pillaton Hall.
- Barbara married 1) Edward, eldest son of Brian Cave of Ingarsby, Leics.; 2) Edward Hastings, a younger son of Francis, earl of Huntingdon
