= Mary Hastings =

English noblewoman (c. 1552 – 1589)

Lady Mary Hastings
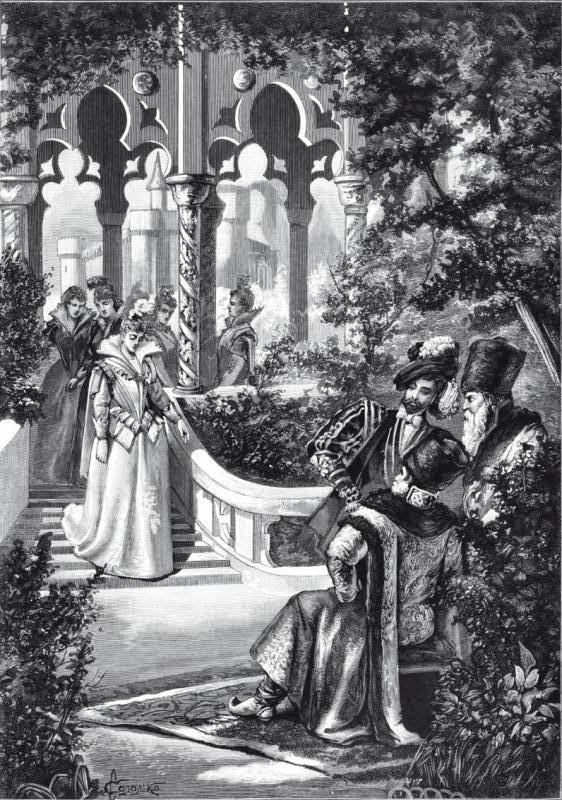
- 19th-century engraving
- Born: c. 1552
- Died: c. 1589
- Other names: "Empress of Muscovia" "Princess of Houtinski"
- Occupation: Courtier
- Parents: Francis Hastings, 2nd Earl of Huntingdon (father); Katherine Pole (mother)

Lady Mary Hastings (c. 1552 – c. 1589) was a courtier at the court of Queen Elizabeth I of England. It was suggested that she would be married to the Russian tsar, Ivan the Terrible, and she was known by the courtesy title of "Empress of Muscovia" despite never marrying him. She died before 1589.

== Biography ==
Mary Hastings was born c. 1552. She was the youngest daughter of Francis Hastings, 2nd Earl of Huntingdon and Katherine Pole. In her youth, her brother Henry Hastings negotiated with John de Vere, 16th Earl of Oxford for Mary or her sister Elizabeth to be betrothed to Edward de Vere, Lord Bulbeck with a dowry of 1,000 marks and a jointure of £1,000. However, the Earl died before Hastings came of age and Edward's new guardian William Cecil, Lord Bughley arranged for him to marry his daughter Ann Cecil instead of one of the Hastings sisters.

By her late 20s, Mary Hastings had joined the court of Queen Elizabeth I. In 1581, Dr Robert Jacobi, an English doctor living in Moscow, suggested that Hastings would make a suitable eighth wife for the Russian tsar, Ivan the Terrible. Hastings was deemed suitable for the marriage as she was a descendant of the House of Plantagenet and was thus of royal blood. The Russian ambassador to England, Fyodor Pisemsky, was ordered by Ivan to report on her appearance and to obtain a portrait for him. Pisemsky was also required to inquire about Mary's potential dowry and, in doing so, to find out "whose daughter she is, of what appanage prince [...] and does she have a brother or sister?"

Elizabeth was in trade negotiations with Russia but delayed seeing Pisemsky in relation to Hastings. When Pisemsky and Elizabeth finally met in 1582, the latter claimed that Hastings had smallpox and that it would be intrusive for her to sit for a portrait. A later meeting in 1583 involved Elizabeth enquiring as to what status the marriage would give Hastings. Pisemsky answered that she would have her own court if she converted to Orthodoxy and that any children they had would be treated as holding equal sovereign status as Ivan's son Fyodor. Eventually, Pisemsky and his interpreter were granted an audience with Hastings at a garden party later in the year by Elizabeth. Jerome Horsey recorded the encounter as such:

Her Majesty caused that lady to be attended on with divers great ladies and maids of honour and young noblemen, the number of each appointed, to be seen by the said Ambassador in York House garden. She put on a stately countenance accordingly. The Ambassador, attended with divers other noblemen and others, was brought before her Ladyship; cast down his countenance; fell prostrate to her feet, rose, ran back from her, his face still towards her, she and the rest admiring at his manner. Said by an interpreter it did suffice him to behold the angel he hoped should be his master’s spouse; commended her angelical countenance, state, and admirable beauty. She after was called by her familiar friends in court the Empress of Muscovia.

Pisemsky obtained the portrait to return to Russia despite Hastings stating she did not want to marry Ivan due to her ill-health and also due to his bigamy. Ivan had stated he would divorce his wife Maria Nagaya in order to marry Hastings.

A month after Pisemsky had left, Elizabeth sent Jerome Bowes as the English ambassador to Russia to persuade them that Hastings had ill-health and could not marry the Ivan. Reportedly when Pisemsky showed the portrait of Hastings, whom he referred to as the "Princess of Hountinski", (Note: Russian: княжна Хантинская, romanized: knyazhna Khatinskaya.) to Ivan, he stated: "She has but lately had smallpox and our painter has been obliged to depict her with a red face, deeply pitted". As a result of this, Ivan declined to continue his intent to marry Hastings. However, according to the account of Bowes, he broke the news to Ivan, telling him: "the Princess Mary is the most distant of all the Queen's relatives, moreover she is sickly and her face is not the most attractive, but the Queen has more than one female relative and there are some ten maids who are closer kin than her." Ivan expressed his intention of sending another envoy, and according to Bowes, Ivan told him that if Elizabeth did not send a bride to his liking, he would go to England himself along with his entire treasury. According to the historian Ruslan Skrynnikov: "Bowes might well be suspected of making great exaggerations in his account; but there can be no doubting Ivan’s fascination with this 'English business.'"

Despite the marriage not occurring, she was referred to by the courtesy title of "Empress of Muscovia" until Ivan's death in 1584. She would remain unmarried until her death in the late 1580s.

== Sources ==
- "Гастингс, Мария" . Brockhaus and Efron Encyclopedic Dictionary (in Russian). 1906.
- Bushkovitch, Paul (2021). Succession to the Throne in Early Modern Russia: The Transfer of Power 1450–1725. Cambridge University Press. p. 105. ISBN 9781108479349.
- Paranque, Estelle (2016). "Mary Hastings (ca. 1552–ca. 1584)". In Levin, Carol (ed.). A Biographical Encyclopedia of Early Modern Englishwomen: Exemplary Lives and Memorable Acts, 1500-1650. Taylor and Francis. pp. 510–511. ISBN 9781315440712.
- Skrynnikov, Ruslan G. (20 October 2015). Reign of Terror: Ivan IV. BRILL. ISBN 978-90-04-30401-7.
- Wilson, Francesca (31 May 2023). Muscovy: Russia through Foreign Eyes 1553-1900. Taylor & Francis. ISBN 978-1-000-90675-2.
