= Katherine Hastings, Countess of Huntingdon =

English noblewoman (d. 1620)

Katherine Hastings
- Countess of Huntingdon
- Born: c. 1538 or 1543–1545; England
- Died: 14 August 1620 (aged 75-82); Chelsea, London, England
- Buried: Chelsea Old Church
- Noble family: Dudley
- Spouse: Henry Hastings, 3rd Earl of Huntingdon
- Father: John Dudley, 1st Duke of Northumberland
- Mother: Jane Guildford

Katherine Hastings (née Dudley), Countess of Huntingdon (c. 1538 or 1543–1545 – 14 August 1620) was an English noblewoman.

She was the youngest surviving daughter of John Dudley, 1st Duke of Northumberland and his wife, Jane Guildford, and a sister of Robert Dudley, Earl of Leicester, Elizabeth I's favourite.

== Marriage ==
Katherine Dudley was betrothed or married on 25 May 1553 at a very young age to Henry Hastings, the heir of Francis Hastings, 2nd Earl of Huntingdon. From her mother's will it appears that she was still under 12 years of age in January 1555, and a clause regarding her marriage implies that the match could still be dissolved: "if it so chance that my Lord Hastings do refuse her or she him".

By the spring of 1559 Katherine Hastings was definitely married, and on the death of her father-in-law in 1560 became Countess of Huntingdon. She remained childless, though she may have suffered a miscarriage in the spring of 1566.

== Frog jewel ==
The Countess of Huntingdon gave Elizabeth I a jewel in the form of a frog set with emeralds as a New Year's Day gift in 1581. The jewel seems to have been an allusion to the Anjou courtship (Elizabeth called Anjou her frog), and attests to the friendly relationship between Katherine and the queen at this time. Similarly, Francis Drake gave Elizabeth a diamond-set frog jewel when she visited his ship the Golden Hind at Deptford in April 1581.

== Career as an educator ==
For many years she lived with her husband in the English Midlands and Yorkshire, where she dedicated herself to the education of young women of the nobility and gentry. Among her pupils were the diarist Margaret Hoby, memoirist Dionys Fitzherbert, and her brother Robert's stepdaughters, the sisters Penelope and Dorothy Devereux. Like her husband, the Countess was a convinced Protestant with Puritan leanings.

== Courtier ==
After the Earl of Huntingdon died at York in December 1595, she lived at court and became one of the closest friends of the old Queen. When young, she had suffered from Elizabeth's distrust of her husband's loyalty, which was nourished by his descent from the House of Plantagenet. She was in debt by £2400 and asked the Queen to help realise her jointure property in March 1597. She was attending the queen privately twice a day in February 1598. Her differences with the new earl, George Hastings, 4th Earl of Huntingdon, over her jointure and her husband's debts were settled on 15 February, and he would have the Savoy House.

== Death ==
Katherine, Countess of Huntingdon died at Chelsea, London on 14 August 1620, and was buried in her mother's tomb at Chelsea Old Church.

== Ancestry ==
Ancestors of Katherine Hastings, Countess of Huntingdon

8. Sir John Dudley of Atherington
4. Edmund Dudley
9. Elizabeth Bramshott
2. John Dudley, 1st Duke of Northumberland
10. Edward Grey, 1st Viscount Lisle
5. Elizabeth Grey, 6th Baroness Lisle
11. Elizabeth Talbot, 3rd Baroness Lisle
1. Katherine Dudley
12. Sir Richard Guildford
6. Sir Edward Guildford
13. Anne Pimpe
3. Jane Guildford
14. Thomas West, 8th Baron De La Warr
7. Eleanor West
15. Elizabeth Mortimer
