= Elizabeth Somerset, Countess of Worcester (1546–1621) =

British noble

The Right Honourable The Countess of Worcester
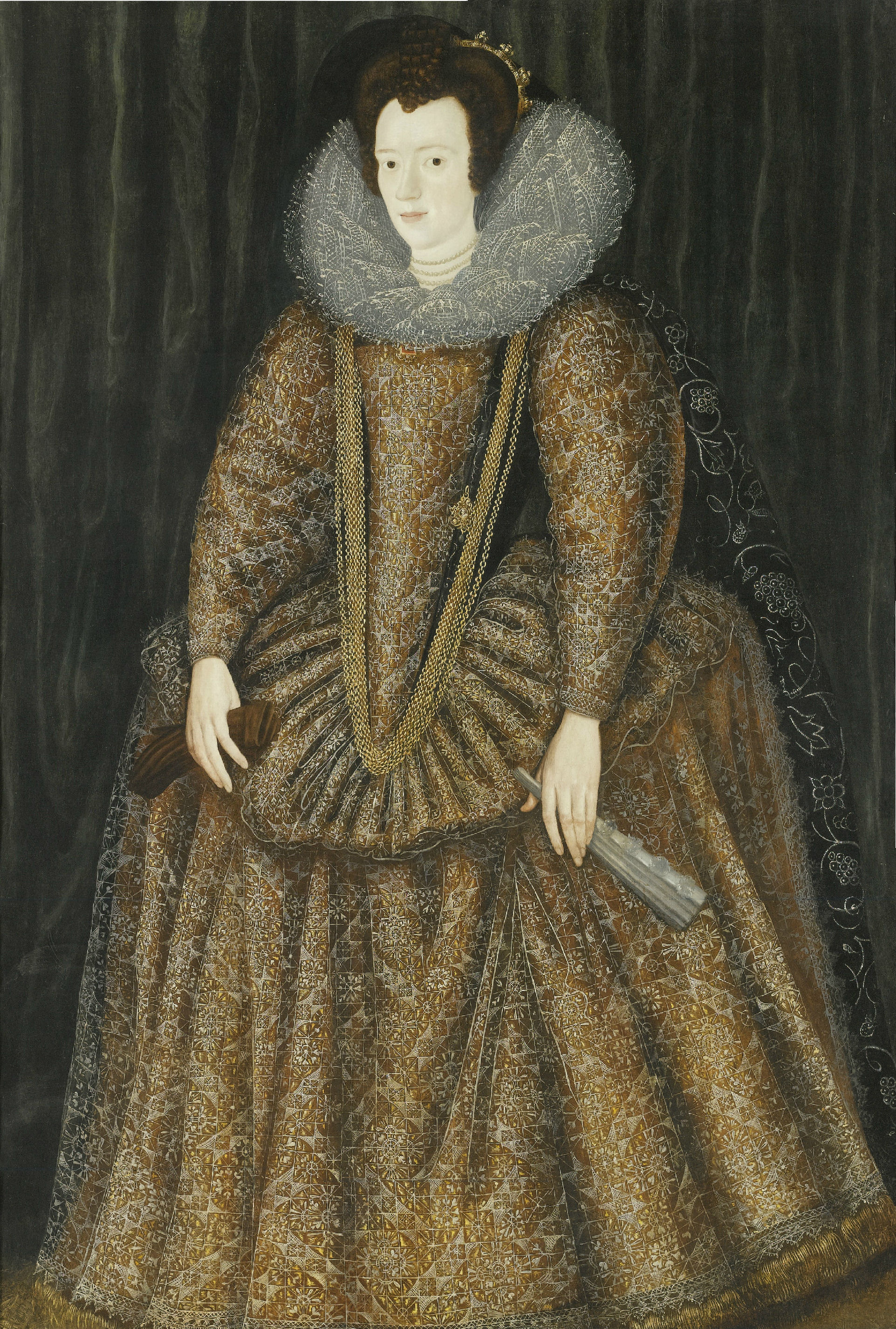
- Elizabeth Somerset, Countess of Worcester, attributed to William Segar
- Tenure: 1571—1621
- Born: Lady Elizabeth Hastings; 1546; Scotland
- Died: 24 August 1621
- Spouse: Edward Somerset, 4th Earl of Worcester (m. 1571)
- Issue: 15, including: Henry Somerset, 1st Marquess of Worcester; Thomas Somerset, 1st Viscount Somerset; Lady Blanche Somerset
- Parents: Francis Hastings, 2nd Earl of Huntingdon; Catherine Pole

Elizabeth Somerset, Countess of Worcester (née Lady Elizabeth Hastings; 1546 – 24 August 1621) was a Scottish-born noblewoman. She was the daughter of Francis Hastings, 2nd Earl of Huntingdon, and Catherine Pole.

On 16 December 1571, at Whitehall Palace, she married Sir Edward Somerset in a triple wedding with Edward de Vere, 17th Earl of Oxford and bride, Anne Cecil, and Edward Sutton, 4th Baron Dudley and bride, Mary Howard. Sir Edward was the son of son of William Somerset, 3rd Earl of Worcester and Christian North. He succeeded as the 4th Earl of Worcester in 1589.

In 1603, Lady Elizabeth travelled to Berwick upon Tweed with other courtiers in an official party to welcome Anne of Denmark. These were chosen by the Privy Council, following the order of King James of 15 April 1603. The group consisted of two countesses, Frances Howard, Countess of Kildare, Lady Elizabeth, Countess of Worcester; two baronesses Philadelphia, Lady Scrope and Penelope, Lady Rich; and two ladies Anne Herbert, a daughter of Henry Herbert, 2nd Earl of Pembroke, and Audrey Walsingham. A Venetian diplomat, Giovanni Carlo Scaramelli, wrote that the six great ladies were escorted by 200 horsemen. They welcomed the new queen into England on 3 June 1603.

== Children ==
The Worcesters had fifteen children (eight sons and seven daughters).

1. Katherine Somerset (born c. 1575) – 30 October 1624) married William Petre
2. William Somerset (born c. 1576)
3. Henry Somerset, 1st Marquess of Worcester (born c. 1576 – 18 December 1646) married Anne Russell
4. Sir Thomas Somerset, 1st Viscount Somerset (born c. 1578) – died 1650) married Helen Barry
5. Robert Somerset (born c. 1580), married Elizabeth Powell, daughter of Sir William Powell.
6. Francis Somerset (born c. 1582, Died as an infant)
7. Lady Blanche Somerset (born c. 1583 – 28 October 1649) married Thomas Arundell, 2nd Baron Arundell of Wardour
8. Sir Charles Somerset (born c. 1584) married Elizabeth Powell
9. Margaret Somerset (born c. 1585) married Thomas Windsor, 6th Baron Windsor.
10. George Somerset (born c. 1586)
11. Edward Somerset (born c. 1588)
12. Elizabeth Somerset (born c. 1590) married Sir Henry Guilford
13. Anne Somerset married Sir Edward Wynter (c. 1560(?)-1619) of Lydney on 11 August 1595.
14. Frances Somerset (born c. 1596) married William Morgan, son of the 1st baronet of Llantarnam.
15. Mary Somerset (born c. 1598)

Lady Elizabeth is buried next to her husband in the Somerset family chapel in the Church of St Cadoc, Raglan, Monmouthshire.

== Ancestry ==
Ancestors of Elizabeth Somerset, Countess of Worcester (1546–1621)

16. William Hastings, 1st Baron Hastings
8. Edward Hastings, 2nd Baron Hastings
17. Katherine Neville, Baroness Hastings
4. George Hastings, 1st Earl of Huntingdon
18. Thomas Hungerford
9. Mary Hungerford
19. Anne Percy
2. Francis Hastings, 2nd Earl of Huntingdon
20. Humphrey Stafford, Earl of Stafford
10. Henry Stafford, 2nd Duke of Buckingham
21. Margaret Beaufort, Countess of Stafford
5. Anne Stafford
22. Richard Woodville, 1st Earl Rivers
11. Catherine Woodville (sister of 31)
23. Jacquetta of Luxembourg
1. Elizabeth Hastings, Countess of Worcester
24. Sir Geoffrey Pole of Worrell and of Wythurn
12. Sir Richard Pole
25. Edith St John
6. Henry Pole, 1st Baron Montagu
26. George Plantagenet, 1st Duke of Clarence
13. Margaret of York & Clarence
27. Isabella Neville
3. Catherine Pole
28. George Nevill, 4th Baron Bergavenny
14. George Nevill, 5th Baron Bergavenny
29. Margaret Fenn
7. Jane Neville
30. Thomas FitzAlan, 17th Earl of Arundel
15. Joan FitzAlan
31. Margaret Woodville (sister of 11)

== Sources ==
- Profile, thepeerage.com. Accessed 16 March 2008
- Profile, familysearch.org. Accessed 18 July 2009
- Richardson, Douglas, Kimball G. Everingham, and David Faris. Plantagenet Ancestry: A Study in Colonial and Medieval Families. Royal ancestry series. (p. 667) Baltimore, Md: Genealogical Pub. Co, 2004. googlebooks Retrieved 16 March 2008
