= Walter Devereux, 1st Earl of Essex =

English noble and general (1541-1576)

The Right Honorable The Earl of Essex KG
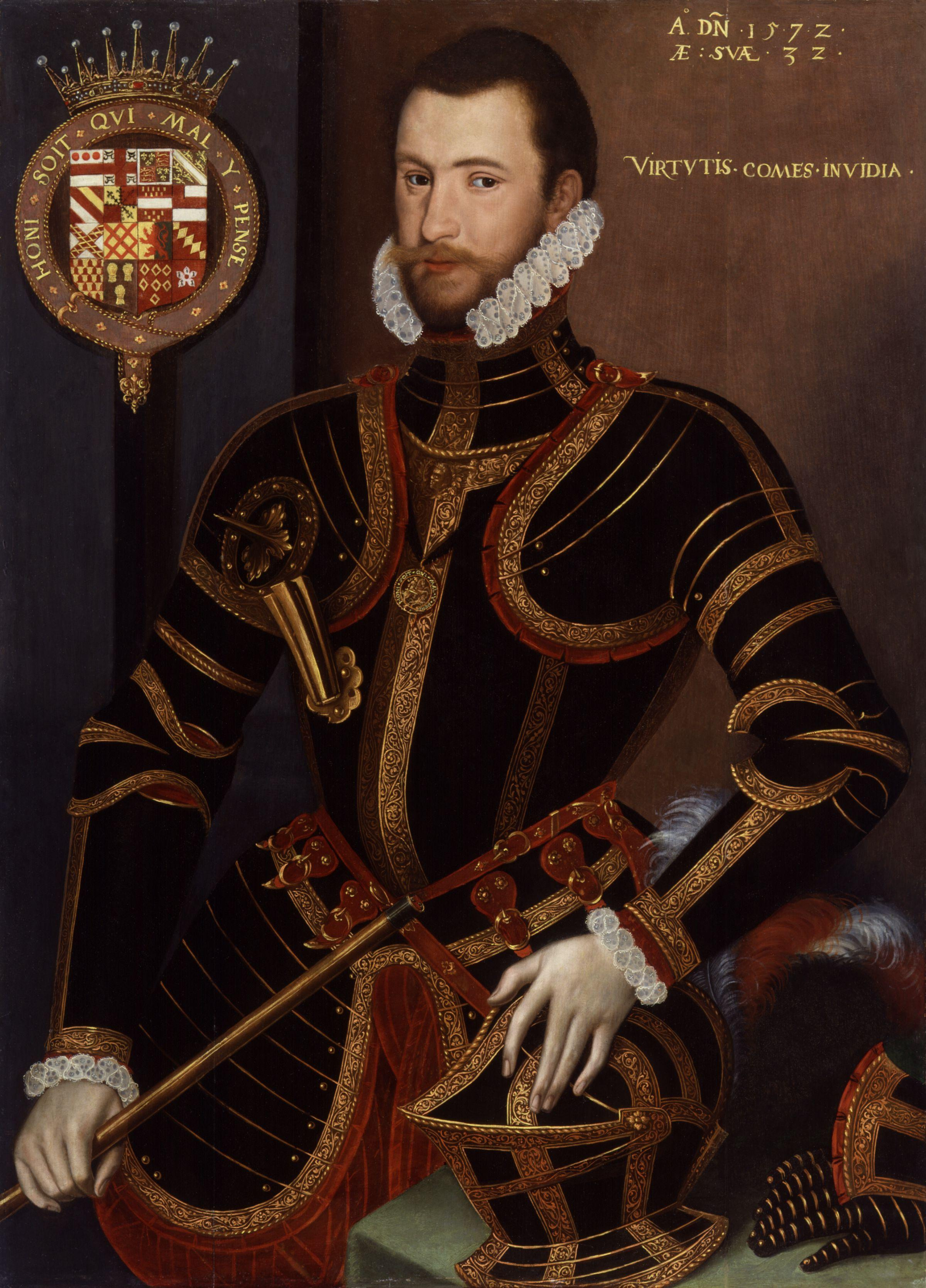
- Walter Devereux, 1st Earl of Essex, as Earl Marshal of England, 1575
- Tenure: 1572–1576
- Successor: Robert Devereux, 2nd Earl of Essex
- Other titles: Viscount Hereford
- Known for: Soldier and courtier
- Born: 16 September 1539; Carmarthen, Wales
- Died: 22 September 1576 (aged 37); Dublin Castle, Ireland
- Buried: Carmarthen, Wales
- Wars and battles: Plantations of Ireland
- Offices: Earl Marshal
- Spouse: Lettice Knollys
- Issue: Penelope Devereux; Dorothy Devereux; Robert Devereux, 2nd Earl of Essex; Walter Devereux; Francis Devereux
- Parents: Sir Richard Devereux; Dorothy Hastings

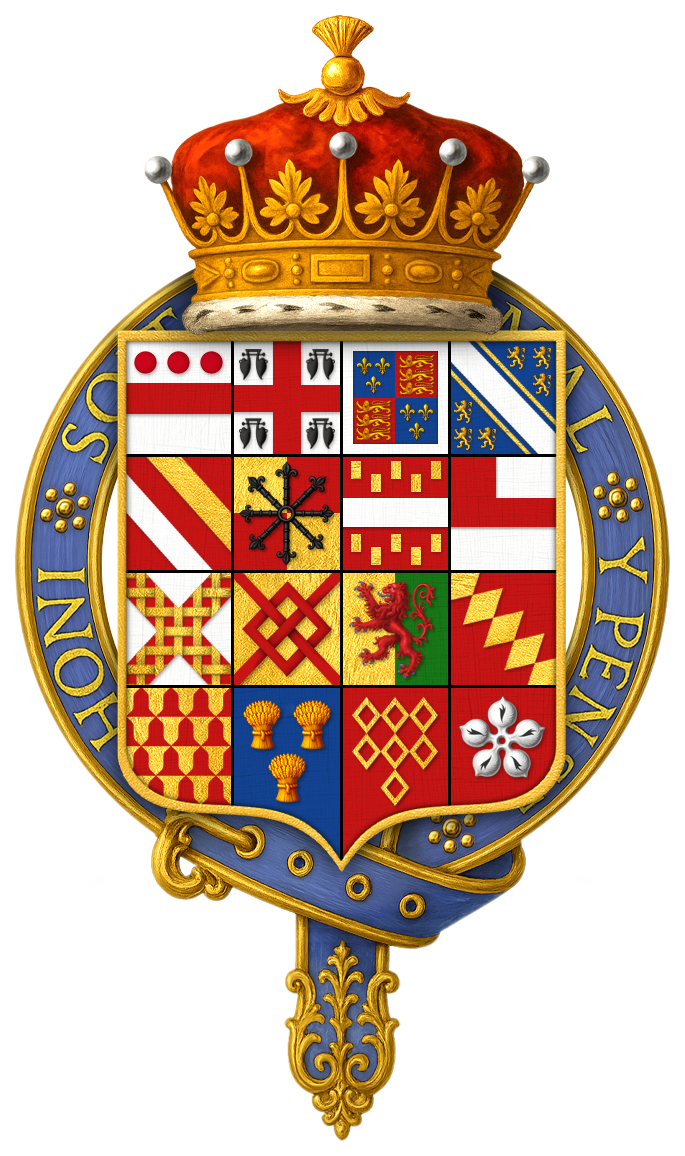
Garter-encircled, quartered arms of Sir Walter Devereux, 1st Earl of Essex, KG

Walter Devereux, 1st Earl of Essex (16 September 1539 – 22 September 1576), was an English nobleman and general. From 1573 until his death he fought in Ireland in connection with the Plantations of Ireland, most notably the Rathlin Island massacre. He was the father of Robert, 2nd Earl of Essex, who was Elizabeth I's favourite during her later years.

== Family ==
Walter Devereux was born on 16 September 1539 at Carmarthen Castle in Carmarthen, Wales. He was the eldest son of Sir Richard Devereux, who was created a knight of the Bath on 20 February 1547 and died that same year, in the lifetime of his father, the 1st Viscount Hereford. Walter Devereux's mother was Lady Dorothy Hastings, daughter of the 1st Earl of Huntingdon and Anne Stafford, said to have been a mistress of King Henry VIII. Through his paternal ancestry he was related to the Bourchier family, to which previous earls of Essex had belonged: (Note: The Bourchier Earldom of Essex and Viscountcy of Bourchier became extinct with the death of Henry Bourchier in 1540. Henry’s daughter, Anne Bourchier, was repudiated by her husband, William Parr, on 17 April 1543 and her children declared bastards and incapable of inheriting. William Parr was created Earl of Essex on 23 December 1543 “with the same place and voice in Parliament as his wife’s [Anne Bourchier’s] father had in his lifetime.” Parr was attainted in 1553 whereby the Earldom of Essex and all his other honours were forfeited. William Parr died on 28 October 1570 and Anne Bourchier on 28 January 1570/1, and both lacked legitimate heirs causing these titles to become extinct.) John Devereux, son of Walter Devereux who died at the Battle of Bosworth, married Cecily Bourchier, sister of Henry Bourchier, 2nd Earl of Essex.

== Career ==
On his grandfather's death, Devereux became on 27 September 1558 The 2nd Viscount Hereford and 11th Baron Ferrers of Chartley. He was entrusted with joint custody of Mary, Queen of Scots, in 1568, and appointed Lord Lieutenant of Staffordshire in 1569 (which he held through the end of his life). Lord Hereford, as he was now, provided signal service in suppressing the Northern Rebellion of 1569, serving as high marshal of the field under The 3rd Earl of Warwick and Lord Clinton. For his zeal in the service of Queen Elizabeth I on this and other occasions, he was made a Knight of the Garter on 17 June 1572 and was created Earl of Essex and Ewe, and Viscount Bourchier, on 4 May 1572. (Note: The titles assumed by the 1st Earl of the Devereux family are attributed to his son in the act of restoration, which recites that “the said Robert, late Earl of Essex, before his said attainder, was lawfully and rightly invested … with the name, state, place, and dignity of Earl of Essex and Ewe, Viscount Hereford and Bourchier, Lord Ferrers of Chartley, and Lord Bourchier and Louvaine.”)

Eager to give proof of "his good devotion to employ himself in the service of her Majesty," Lord Essex, as he was now, offered on certain conditions to subdue or colonise, at his own expense, a portion of the Irish province of Ulster. At that time, Ulster, in the north of Ireland, was completely under the dominion of the O'Neills, led by Sir Brian MacPhelim and Sir Turlough Luineach, and of the Scots led by Sorley Boy MacDonnell. His offer, with certain modifications, was accepted. He set sail for Ireland from Liverpool in August 1573, accompanied by a number of earls, knights and gentlemen, and with a force of about 1,200 men.

His enterprise had an inauspicious beginning; a storm dispersed his fleet and drove some of his vessels as far as Cork and the Isle of Man. His forces did not all reach the place of rendezvous till late in the autumn, and he was compelled to entrench himself at Belfast for the winter. Here his troops were diminished by sickness, famine and desertion to not much more than 200 men.

Intrigues of various sorts and fighting of a guerilla type followed, and Essex had difficulties both with his deputy Fitzwilliam and with the Queen. He was in dire straits, and his offensive movements in the east of Ulster took the form of raids and brutal massacres among the O'Neills. In October 1574, he treacherously captured MacPhelim at a conference and feast in Belfast Castle, and after slaughtering his attendants there, had MacPhelim, his wife and brother executed at Dublin. He arrested William Piers, who had been active in driving the Scots out of Ulster, and accused him of passing military intelligence to Sir Brian mac Phelim O'Neill. Essex ordered Piers's arrest and detention in Carrickfergus Castle in December 1574, but Piers was freed and he successfully executed Sir Brian mac Phelim O'Neill for treason.

After encouraging Lord Essex to prepare to attack the Irish chief Sir Turlough Luineach O'Neill, apparently at the instigation of The 1st Earl of Leicester, the Queen suddenly commanded him to "break off his enterprise." However, she left him a certain discretionary power, and he took advantage of that to defeat Sir Turlough Luineach and chastise County Antrim. He also massacred several hundreds of Sorley Boy's following, chiefly women and children, who had hidden in the caves of Rathlin Island in the face of an amphibious assault led by Francis Drake and Sir John Norreys.

He returned to England at the end of 1575, resolved "to live henceforth an untroubled life." He was, however, persuaded to accept the offer of the Queen to make him Earl Marshal of Ireland. He arrived in Dublin in September 1576, but fell ill at the banquet given in his honour at Dublin Castle, and died three weeks later, probably of dysentery. It was suspected that he had been poisoned at the behest of Lord Leicester, who married his widow two years later. A post-mortem was carried out and concluded that Essex had died of natural causes (Alice Draycott, daughter of the prominent judge Henry Draycott, who drank from the same cup as Essex at the banquet, also died soon afterwards). He was succeeded in the Earldom of Essex by his son Robert.

== Marriage and issue ==
In 1561 or 1562, Lord Hereford, as he was at the time, married Lettice Knollys, daughter of Sir Francis Knollys and Catherine Carey. Lord and Lady Hereford, later Earl and Countess of Essex, had the following children:

- Robert Devereux, 2nd Earl of Essex. Married Frances Walsingham
- Sir Walter Devereux. Married Margaret, daughter of Arthur Dakyns. He was killed at the siege of Rouen in 1591.
- Penelope Devereux. Married The 3rd Baron Rich
- Dorothy Devereux. Married The 9th Earl of Northumberland
- Francis Devereux (died in infancy)
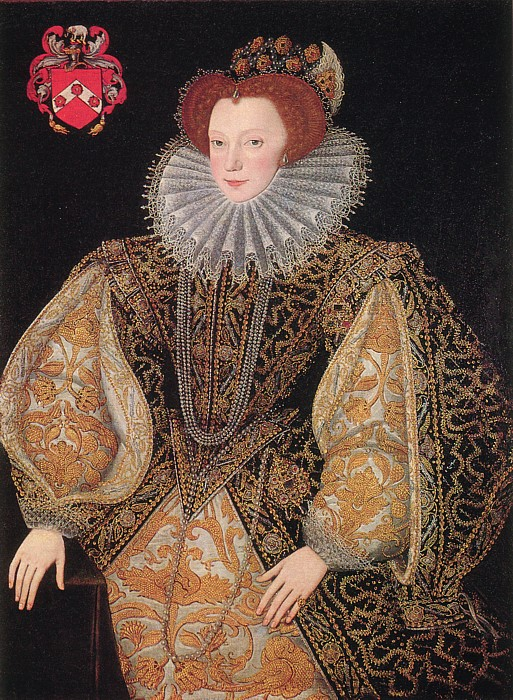
Lettice Knollys

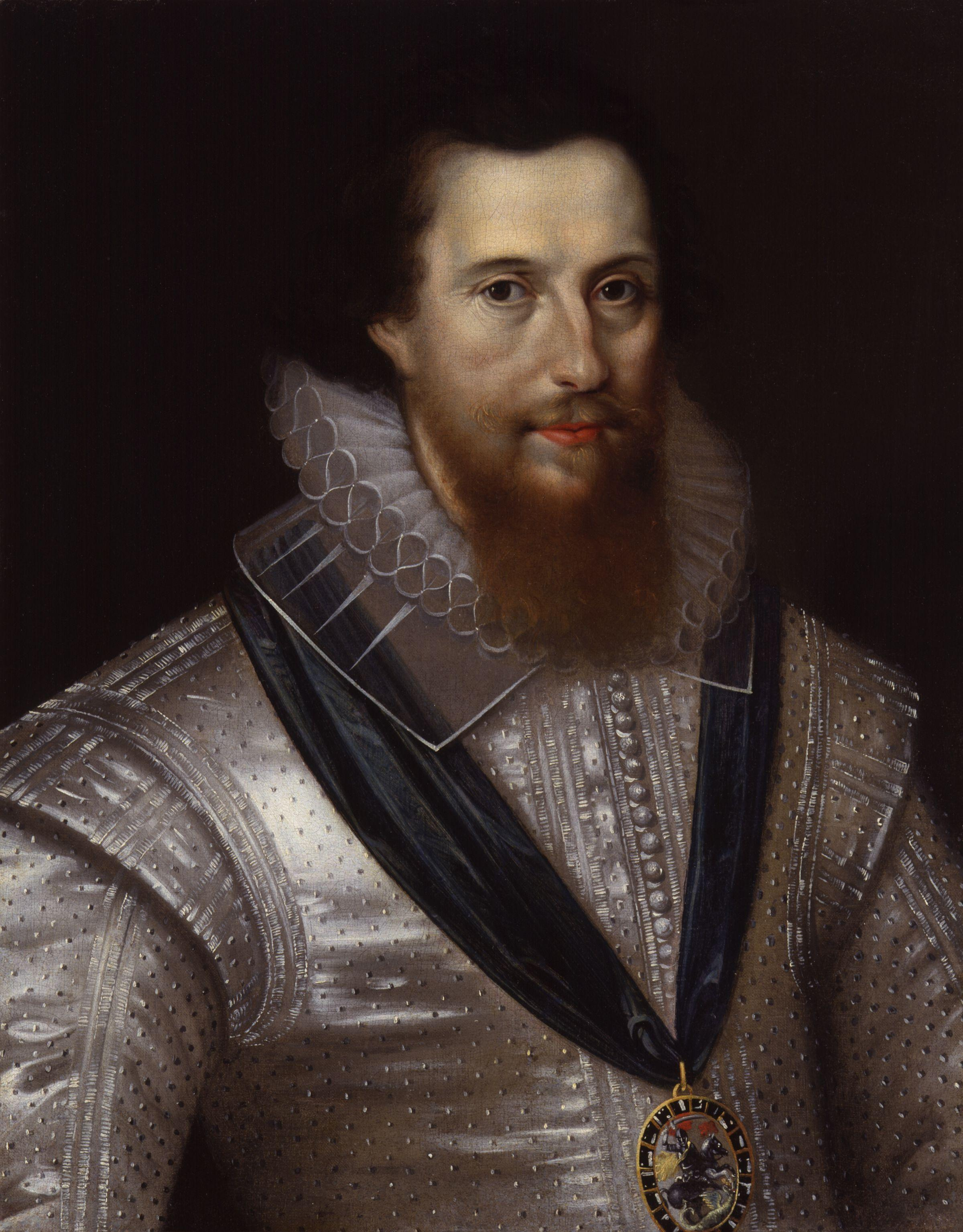
Robert Devereux, 2nd Earl of Essex

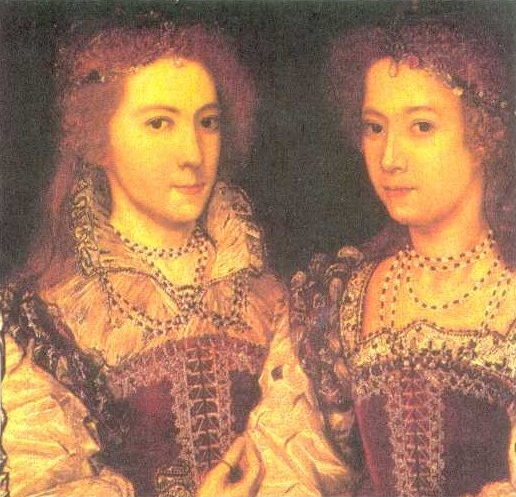
Dorothy and Penelope Devereux

== See also ==
- Betrayal of Clannabuidhe
- Rathlin Island Massacre

== Notes ==
Honorary titles
Preceded by The Lord Paget	Custos Rotulorum of Staffordshire; 1569–1576	Succeeded by Thomas Trentham
Peerage of England
New creation	Earl of Essex; 8th creation 1572–1576	Succeeded by Robert Devereux
Preceded by Walter Devereux	Viscount Hereford; 1558–1576	Succeeded by Robert Devereux
Preceded by Anne Bourchier	Baron Bourchier; 1571–1576	Succeeded by Robert Devereux
