= Francis Hastings, 2nd Earl of Huntingdon =

English nobleman (1514–1561)

The Right Honourable Francis Hastings KG
- Earl of Huntingdon
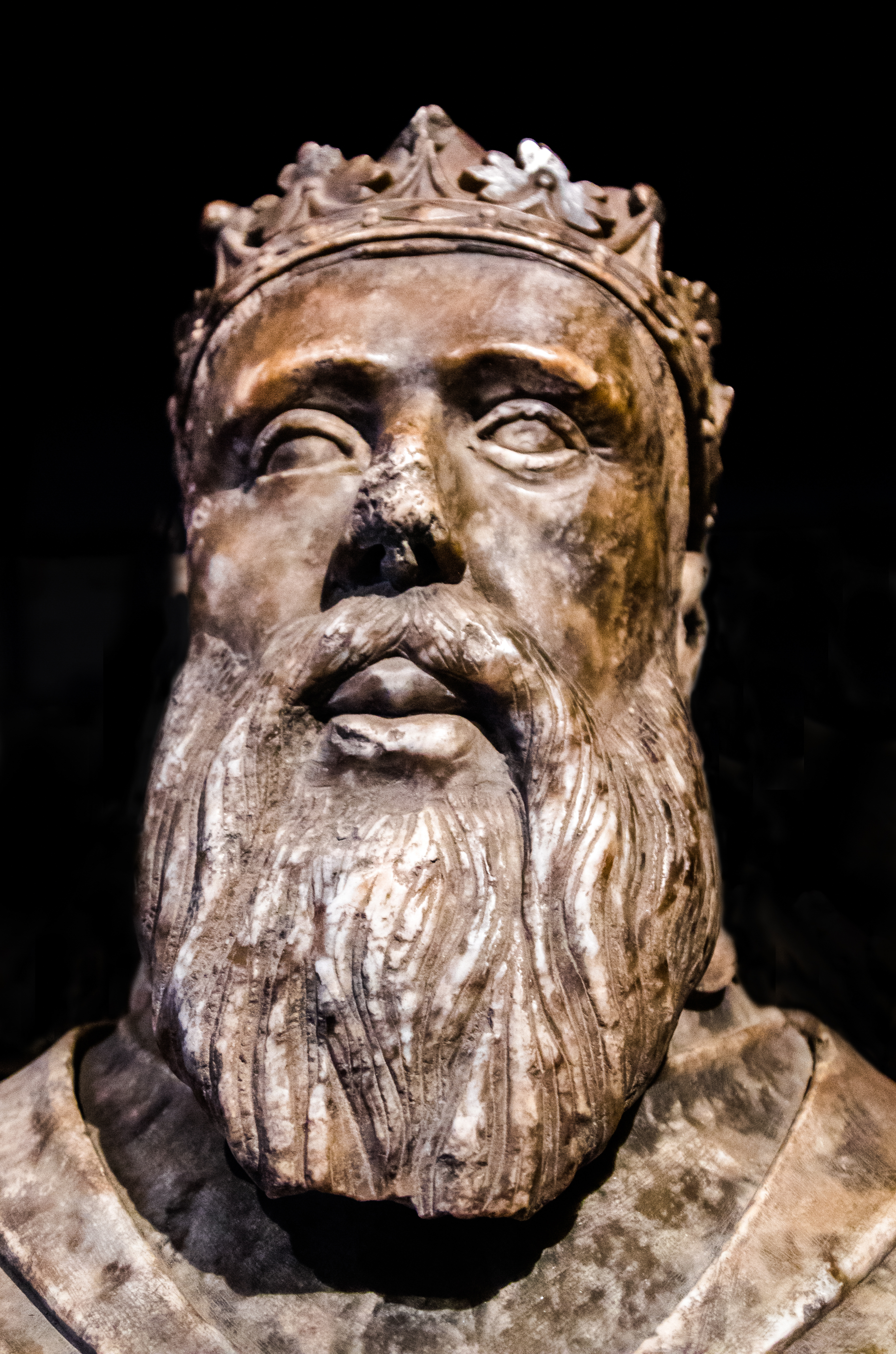
- Effigy of Francis Hastings, 2nd Earl of Huntingdon, on his tomb

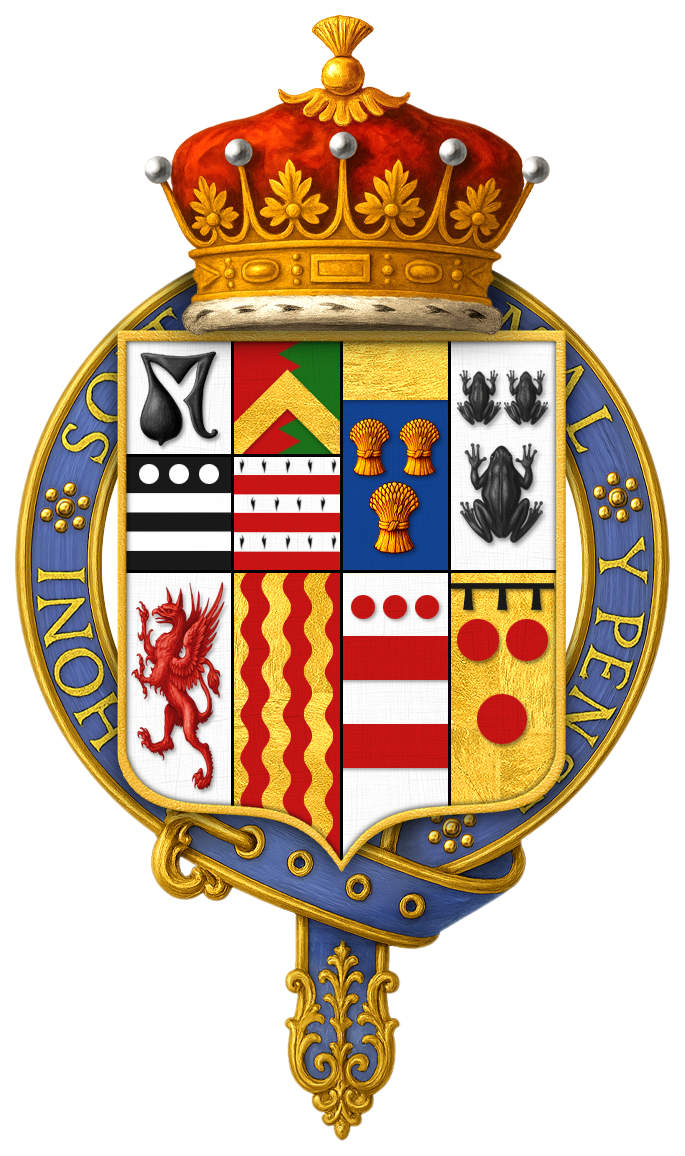
- Coat of arms
- Tenure: 1544–1560
- Predecessor: George Hastings, 1st Earl of Huntingdon
- Successor: Henry Hastings, 3rd Earl of Huntingdon
- Other titles: Baron Hastings; Baron of Botreaux
- Born: 1514; Ashby-de-la-Zouch
- Died: 20 June 1560 (aged 45–46)
- Buried: St Helen's Church, Ashby-de-la-Zouch
- Spouse: Katherine Pole (m. 1532)
- Issue: Lady Frances Anne Hastings; Henry Hastings, 3rd Earl of Huntingdon; Hon. William Hastings; George Hastings, 4th Earl of Huntingdon; Hon. Sir Edward Hastings; Lady Catherine Hastings; Hon. Walter Hastings; Lady Elizabeth Hastings; Lady Anne Hastings; Hon. Sir Francis Hastings; Lady Mary Hastings
- Father: George Hastings, 1st Earl of Huntingdon
- Mother: Lady Anne Stafford

Francis Hastings, 2nd Earl of Huntingdon KG (1514 – 20 June 1560) was the eldest son of George Hastings, 1st Earl of Huntingdon and Anne Stafford, Countess of Huntingdon, the ex-mistress of Henry VIII.

His maternal first cousins included Henry Stafford, 1st Baron Stafford and Henry Radclyffe, 2nd Earl of Sussex.

He was born in Ashby-de-la-Zouch, Leicestershire. He was tutored by John Leland during his youth. His mother, Anne Stafford, Countess of Huntingdon had an affair with Henry VIII in 1510, the discovery of which led her husband to remove her to a convent and her brother to leave court in a rage, refusing to stay under Henry's roof.

As late as 1513, Anne was the courtier who received the second most expensive New Year's gift from Henry, indicating that their relationship continued until then. However, there are no contemporary references to the possibility of Francis being an illegitimate son of the Tudor monarch. His father was created the first Earl of Huntingdon by Henry VIII on 3 November 1529. He was awarded stewardship over two abbeys in 1530.

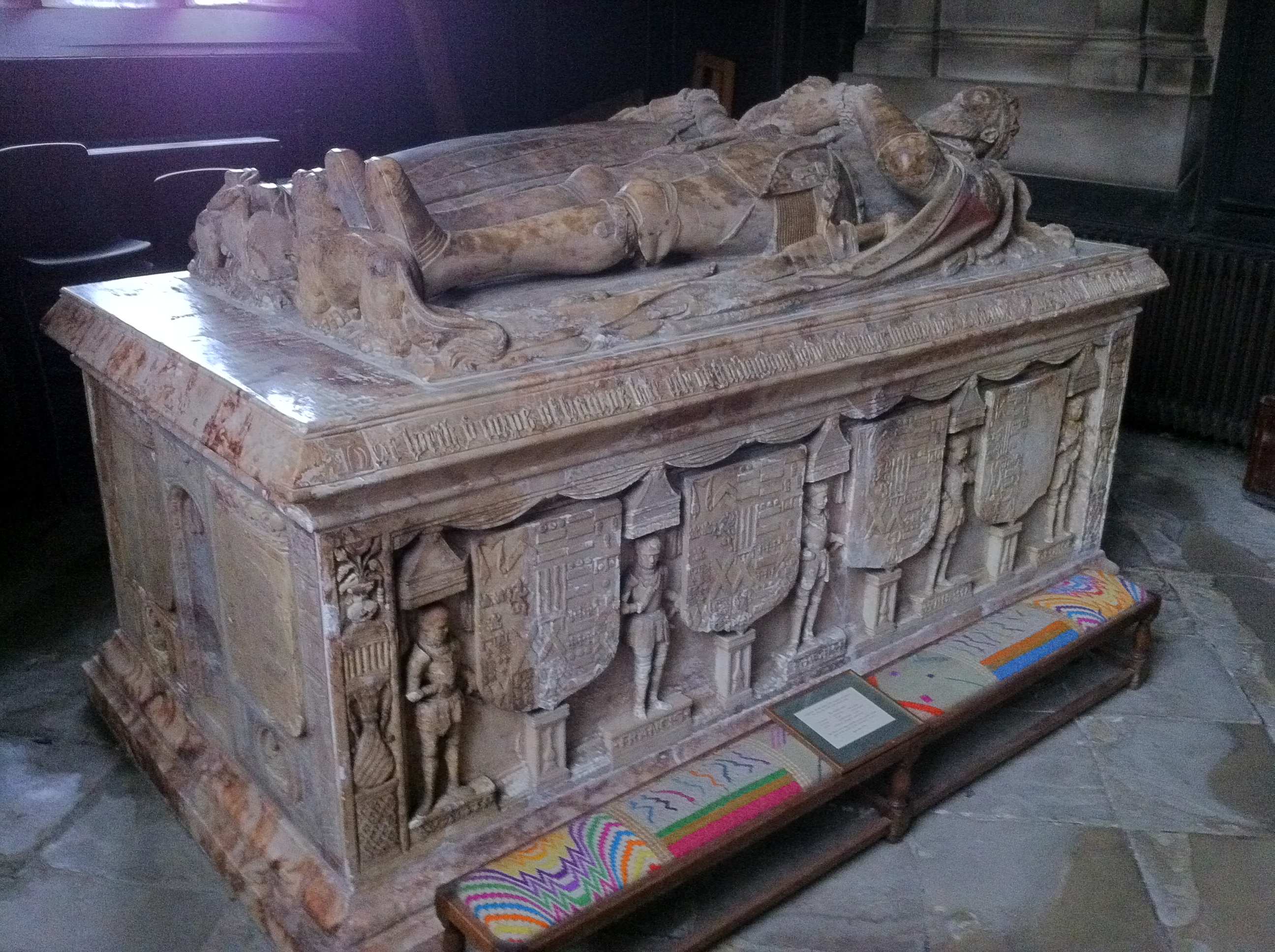
Alabaster tomb of Francis Hastings, 2nd Earl of Huntingdon in St Helen's Church, Ashby-de-la-Zouch

== Marriage and children ==
Francis married Katherine Pole (1519 – 23 September 1576) on 25 June 1532. She was a daughter of Henry Pole, 1st Baron Montagu and Jane Neville. Henry Pole was the oldest son of Sir Richard Pole and Lady Margaret Pole, 8th Countess of Salisbury, daughter of George of York, Duke of Clarence and his wife Lady Isabel, Duchess of Clarence. Jane was in turn a daughter of George Neville, 5th Baron Bergavenny and Margaret, daughter of Hugh Fenn. They had eleven children:

- Frances Anne Hastings (1533–1574). Married Henry Compton, 1st Baron Compton and was mother of William Compton, 1st Earl of Northampton.
- Henry Hastings, 3rd Earl of Huntingdon (1536 – 14 December 1595).
- William Hastings (born 1537).
- George Hastings, 4th Earl of Huntingdon (1540 – 3 December 1604).
- Sir Edward Hastings (1541–1603?). Married Barbara Devereux, daughter of Sir William Devereux and Jane Scudamore. Her paternal grandfather was Walter Devereux, 1st Viscount Hereford. She was the sole heir of both her father and her previous husband Edward Cave. Her considerable inheritance included Leicester Abbey. Hans Francis Hastings, 12th Earl of Huntingdon and all subsequent Earls of Huntingdon are descended in the paternal line from Edward.
- Catherine Hastings (11 August 1542 – 22 September 1576). Married Henry Clinton, 2nd Earl of Lincoln and was mother of Thomas Clinton, 3rd Earl of Lincoln.
- Walter Hastings (1544 – 20 August 1616). Married Joyce Roper.
- Elizabeth Hastings (c. 1546 – 24 August 1621). Married Edward Somerset, 4th Earl of Worcester.
- Anne Hastings (born 1548).
- Francis Hastings (c. 1550 – 26 September 1610). Married Maud Longford.
- Mary Hastings (born 1552) (ru) – Ivan the Terrible's potential bride. The 1583 Russian Embassy to discuss the marriage was unsuccessful.

== Political career ==
He seems to have gained some favour and was created a Knight of the Bath in 1533. His father died on 24 March 1544 and Francis succeeded as the 2nd Earl of Huntingdon. At the coronation of Edward VI on 20 February 1547, Huntingdon carried St. Edward's staff and took a prominent part in the jousting competition held in celebration of the event.

He was a political supporter of John Dudley, 1st Duke of Northumberland during the protectorate of Edward Seymour, 1st Duke of Somerset. He was the one to lead Somerset to the Tower of London for his imprisonment on 13 October 1549. He was rewarded with a creation as a Knight of the Garter before the end of that day, alongside George Brooke, 9th Baron Cobham, Thomas West, 9th Baron De La Warr and William Herbert, 1st Earl of Pembroke.

The Kingdom of England was at this point at war with Scotland and France, under Mary, Queen of Scots and King Henri II, respectively. Huntingdon was named Lieutenant General of the army and Chief Captain of the fleet in a campaign against Boulogne-sur-Mer. His complaining about the lack of sufficient funding and equipment for his campaign was probably justified. The campaign led however to the signing of the Peace of Boulogne. According to its terms, all English claims were forfeit in exchange for 400,000 crowns. The British forces accordingly withdrew from Boulogne and all hostilities ceased for a time.

After this reasonable success for Huntingdon, Northumberland was able to provide his supporter with a membership in the Privy council. He accompanied Edward VI in 1552 and Northumberland in 1553 during their respective travels in English territory away from London. He probably enjoyed the trust of both at the time. In 1553, Huntingdon was further awarded with several estates in Leicestershire which were previously held by John Beaumont. Beaumont had been attainted and was by then deceased. Huntingdon generously allowed the widow of Beaumont to keep their family manor in Grace-Dieu where further members of this family would survive.

On 21 May 1553, his eldest son Henry married Katherine Dudley, the youngest daughter of their ally Northumberland. Huntingdon was among the nobles who signed the document proclaiming Lady Jane Grey heir of Edward VI. Jane was married to Lord Guildford Dudley, son to Northumberland and brother-in-law of Henry Hastings. Huntingdon probably held high hopes for his son under the new reign.

He was among the supporters of Jane in her brief reign (10 – 19 July 1553) but this reign ended in revolt in favour of her cousin Mary I of England. Huntingdon was arrested and incarcerated in the Tower of London. He was released in January 1554 and immediately assigned to locate and arrest the rebellious Henry Grey, 1st Duke of Suffolk, father of Jane Grey. He was successful and led Suffolk to the Tower for his incarceration. He was present for the execution of Thomas Wyatt the younger (on 11 April 1554).

Hastings was a nephew by marriage of Cardinal Reginald Pole who was a favourite of Mary I and briefly Archbishop of Canterbury (1554–1558). This connection allowed him to avoid persecution for his Protestantism. Mary died in 1558 and was succeeded by the Protestant Elizabeth I.

He died in June 1560 and was buried in St Helen's Church, Ashby-de-la-Zouch where his alabaster monument still exists in the Hastings Chapel. He was succeeded by his eldest surviving son Henry.

Political offices
Preceded by The Marquess of Dorset	Lord Lieutenant of Leicestershire; 1551–1552	Succeeded by The Duke of Suffolk
Preceded by The Duke of Suffolk	Lord Lieutenant of Leicestershire jointly with Lord Hastings 1559–1561; 1554–1561	Succeeded by The Earl of Huntingdon
Peerage of England
Preceded by George Hastings	Earl of Huntingdon; 1544–1561	Succeeded by Henry Hastings
Preceded by George Hastings	Baron Hastings; 1544–1559	Succeeded by Henry Hastings
