= Edward Somerset, 4th Earl of Worcester =

English aristocrat (c.1550–1628)

Edward Somerset
- Earl of Worcester
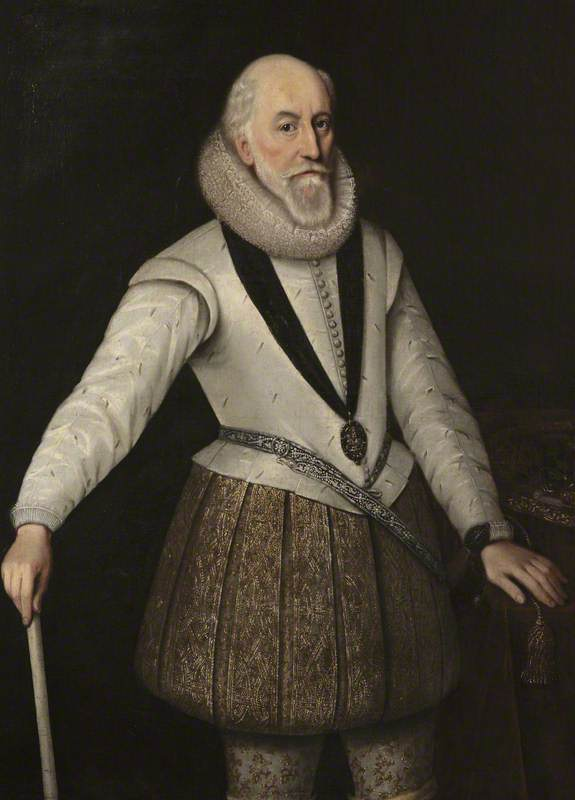
- Portrait by Gilbert Jackson

Lord Privy Seal
- Tenure: 1616 - 1625
- Predecessor: Robert Carr, 1st Earl of Somerset
- Successor: Sir John Coke
- Born: circa 1550
- Died: 3 March 1628
- Noble family: House of Beaufort
- Spouse: Elizabeth Hastings, Countess of Worcester
- Issue: Henry Somerset, 5th Earl of Worcester; Thomas Somerset, 1st Viscount Somerset; Catherine Somerset; Blanche Somerset; Frances Somerset
- Father: William Somerset, 3rd Earl of Worcester
- Mother: Christiana North

Quartered arms of Sir Edward Somerset, 4th Earl of Worcester

Edward Somerset, 4th Earl of Worcester, KG, Earl Marshal (c. 1550 – 3 March 1628) was an English aristocrat. He was an important advisor to King James I (James VI of Scots), serving as Lord Privy Seal.

== Career ==
He was the only son of three children born to the 3rd Earl of Worcester and Christiana North, daughter of Edward North, 1st Baron North. On 21 February 1589, he succeeded his father as Earl of Worcester.

In June 1590, Worcester travelled to Edinburgh to congratulate James VI of Scotland on his safe return from Denmark and marriage to Anne of Denmark, and gave notice that the king was to join the Order of the Garter. His allowance was £5 per day. The Earl discussed with James rumours that English ships had lain in wait for his return. At first, he was not able to see Anne of Denmark who had toothache, and he joked that in England this would be interpreted as a sign she was pregnant. Worcester had an audience with Anne, and took her letter to Elizabeth. He was accompanied by Lord Compton who watched 'pastimes' or hunting on the sands of Leith.

In 1593 he was made a Knight of the Garter. In a letter of September 1602 he mentions that Queen Elizabeth was entertained in the Privy Chamber with country dances and Irish tunes.

The Earl of Worcester was Master of the Horse to Elizabeth I, and Master of Anne of Denmark's household. He wrote a letter describing the formation of the queen's household in 1604 which is frequently quoted by historians. In 1606 he was appointed Keeper of the Great Park, a park created for hunting by Henry VIII around Nonsuch Palace, of which Worcester Park was a part. The residence Worcester Park House was built in 1607.

== Family ==
He married Lady Elizabeth Hastings on 16 December 1571 at Whitehall Palace in a triple wedding with Edward de Vere, 17th Earl of Oxford and bride, Anne Cecil, and Edward Sutton, 4th Baron Dudley and bride, Mary Howard. She was a daughter of Francis Hastings, 2nd Earl of Huntingdon and Catherine Pole. Catherine was a daughter of Henry Pole, 1st Baron Montagu and Jane Neville. Jane was in turn a daughter of George Nevill, 4th Baron Bergavenny and his wife Margaret, daughter of Hugh Fenn. They had fifteen children among whom were:

- William Somerset, born before 20 Apr 1576, died 1597/98. Edward's eldest son, preceded his father unmarried and without issue.
- Henry Somerset, 5th Earl of Worcester, his heir and successor, who was later created the 1st Marquess of Worcester;
- Thomas Somerset, 1st Viscount Somerset (Peerage of Ireland), who was born in 1579, died in 1649; he was created Viscount Somerset on 8 December 1626; in 1616 he married Helen Barry – her third marriage -, with whom he had one daughter:
  - Elizabeth Somerset, who might have died young, but that is unsure;
- Lady Anne Somerset, who married Sir Edward Wynter (als Wyntour) of Lydney, Gloucestershire, on 11 August 1595.
- Lady Catherine or Katherine Somerset, who died on 6 November 1654 and, before 14 January 1607, married Thomas Windsor, 6th Baron Windsor, with whom she had no issue.
- Lady Blanche Somerset, who died 28 October 1649, and married Thomas Arundell, 2nd Baron Arundell of Wardour, with whom she had one son and two daughters, his only children; the settlement for this marriage was on 11 May 1607.
- Lady Frances Somerset, wife of William Morgan of Llantarnam and mother of Edward Morgan (c. 1612 – 24 June 1653), who was the great-great-grandfather of Daniel Boone.
- Sir Charles Somerset (1587/8 – 1665), traveller and writer, Knight of the Bath, who married Elizabeth Powell in February 1609.
- Lady Elizabeth Somerset, married Sir Henry Guildford.
- Lady Katherine Somerset (1575–1624), married William Petre, 2nd Baron Petre.

Four of his daughters danced as the rivers of Monmouthshire in the court masque Tethys' Festival on 5 June 1610; Lady Catherine Windsor as the "Nymph of Usk"; Lady Katherine Petre as the "Nymph of Olwy"; Lady Elizabeth Guildford as the "Nymph of Dulesse"; and Lady Mary Wintour as the "Nymph of Wye".

Somerset is buried in the family chapel in the Church of St Cadoc, Raglan, Monmouthshire

== Ancestry ==
Ancestors of Edward Somerset, 4th Earl of Worcester

8. Charles Somerset, 1st Earl of Worcester
4. Henry Somerset, 2nd Earl of Worcester
9. Elizabeth Herbert, 3rd Baroness Herbert
2. William Somerset, 3rd Earl of Worcester
10. Sir Anthony Browne
5. Elizabeth Browne
11. Lucy Neville
1. Edward Somerset, 4th Earl of Worcester
12. Roger North
6. Edward North, 1st Baron North
13. Christian Warcup
3. Christian North
14. Oliver Squier
7. Alice Squier
15. Elizabeth Murfyn

Political offices
| Preceded by The Earl of Essex | Master of the Horse; 1601–1616 | Succeeded by Sir George Villiers |
| Preceded by The 2nd Earl of Pembroke | Custos Rotulorum of Monmouthshire; 1601–1628 | Succeeded by The 3rd Earl of Pembroke |
| Preceded by The 2nd Earl of Pembroke | Lord Lieutenant of Glamorgan and Monmouthshire jointly with Henry Somerset 1626–1628; 1602–1628 | Succeeded by The Earl of Worcester |
| Preceded by In Commission | Earl Marshal; 1603 | Succeeded by In Commission |
| Preceded by The Earl of Somerset | Lord Privy Seal; 1616–1625 | Succeeded by Sir John Coke |
Peerage of England
| Preceded by William Somerset | Earl of Worcester; 1589–1628 | Succeeded by Henry Somerset |
| Preceded by William Somerset | Baron Herbert (descended by acceleration); 1589–1604 | Succeeded by Henry Somerset |
