= Edward Hastings (died 1603) =

English politician

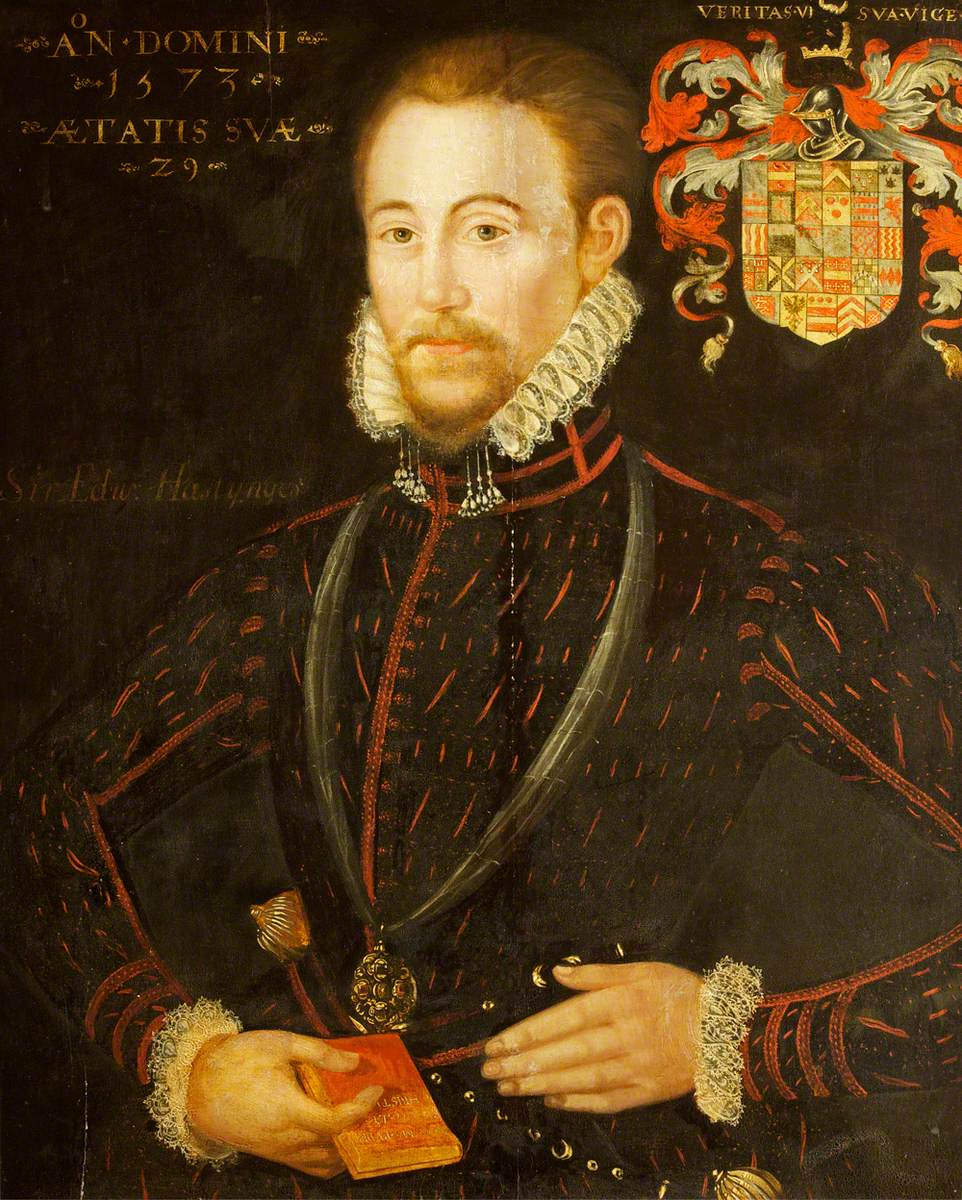
Image of Sir Edward Hastings

Sir Edward Hastings (died possibly 1603) was an English politician. He was a Member (MP) of the Parliament of England for Tregony in 1571, and Leicestershire in 1597–98. He was knighted by Thomas Radclyffe, 3rd Earl of Sussex, in 1570.

== Family ==
He was the fourth son of the Francis Hastings, 2nd Earl of Huntingdon and purchased the estate of Leicester Abbey from his brother, Henry Hastings, 3rd Earl of Huntingdon. He was married to Barbara Devereux (second daughter of Sir William Devereux and Jane Scudamore); they had four sons and one daughter.
