= George Hastings, 1st Earl of Huntingdon =

English nobleman

The Right Honourable George Hastings KB
- Earl of Huntingdon
- Coat of arms
- Tenure: 1529–1544 (Earl of Huntingdon); 1520–1544 (Baron Botreaux, Baron Hungerford, and Baron de Moleyns); 1506–1544 (Baron Hastings)
- Predecessor: New creation (Earl of Huntingdon); Mary Hungerford (Baron Botreaux, Baron Hungerford, and Baron de Moleyns); Edward Hastings, 2nd Baron Hastings (Baron Hastings)
- Successor: Francis Hastings, 2nd Earl of Huntingdon
- Born: 1488; Ashby-de-la-Zouch
- Died: 24 March 1544 (aged 55–56)
- Spouse: Lady Anne Stafford (m. 1509; died 1544)
- Issue: Francis Hastings, 2nd Earl of Huntingdon; Hon. Sir Thomas Hastings; Edward Hastings, 1st Baron Hastings of Loughborough; Hon. Henry Hastings; Hon. William Hastings; Lady Dorothy Hastings; Lady Mary Hastings; Lady Katherine Hastings
- Father: Edward Hastings, 2nd Baron Hastings
- Mother: Mary Hungerford

George Hastings, 1st Earl of Huntingdon, KB (1488 – 24 March 1544) was an English nobleman.

== Family ==
George Hastings, born in 1488 at Ashby-de-la-Zouch, was the son of Edward Hastings, 2nd Baron Hastings, and Mary Hungerford, daughter and heiress of Sir Thomas Hungerford of Rowden, Wiltshire, by Anne Percy, granddaughter of Henry Percy, 2nd Earl of Northumberland, and Eleanor Neville, daughter of Ralph Neville, 1st Earl of Westmorland.

== Career ==
Hastings was created a Knight of the Bath in November 1501, and succeeded to his father's title between 4 and 15 November 1506. In 1513 he served with King Henry VIII's army in France, and was present when both Therouanne and Tournai were taken by the English forces. He was present at the 1520 meeting between Henry VIII and Francis I of France, now known as the Field of the Cloth of Gold and when Charles V, Holy Roman Emperor, visited England in 1522.

He was created Earl of Huntingdon on 8 December 1529. On the same day his eldest son, Francis, gained a seat at the so-called Reformation Parliament. In 1536 he held a command in the forces which put down the rebellion called the Pilgrimage of Grace.

Huntingdon was a close friend of the King. His wife, Anne, was the King's mistress in 1510, and possibly until 1513; she later had a close relationship with another of her husband's friends, the courtier and soldier William Compton.

== Marriage and issue ==
George Hastings married, about December 1509, Anne Stafford, widow of Sir Walter Herbert (died 16 December 1507). She was the daughter of Henry Stafford, 2nd Duke of Buckingham, and Katherine Woodville, the daughter of Richard Woodville, 1st Earl Rivers, by Jacquetta of Luxembourg, daughter of Pierre de Luxembourg, Count of St. Pol.

George Hastings and Anne Stafford had five sons and three daughters:

- Francis Hastings, 2nd Earl of Huntingdon (1514 – 25 January 1569). Father of both Henry Hastings, 3rd Earl of Huntingdon and George Hastings, 4th Earl of Huntingdon.
- Sir Thomas Hastings. Married Winifred Pole, daughter of Henry Pole, 1st Baron Montagu and Jane Neville. Jane was a daughter of George Nevill, 5th Baron Bergavenny and his wife Margaret, daughter of Hugh Fenn; no issue.
- Edward Hastings, 1st Baron Hastings of Loughborough (c.1521 – 1572)
- Henry Hastings.
- William Hastings.
- Dorothy Hastings, who married Sir Richard Devereux, a son of Walter Devereux, 1st Viscount Hereford. They were parents of Walter Devereux, 1st Earl of Essex.
- Mary Hastings, who married Thomas Berkeley, 6th Baron Berkeley.
- Katherine Hastings.

== Ancestry ==
Ancestors of George Hastings, 1st Earl of Huntingdon

16. Ralph Hastings
8. Sir Leonard Hastings
17. Maud Sutton
4. William Hastings, 1st Baron Hastings
18. Thomas de Camoys, 1st Baron Camoys
9. Alice Camoys
19. Lady Elizabeth Mortimer
2. Edward Hastings, 2nd Baron Hastings
20. Ralph de Neville, 1st Earl of Westmorland
10. Richard Neville, 5th Earl of Salisbury
21. Joan Beaufort
5. Katherine Neville
22. Thomas Montacute, 4th Earl of Salisbury
11. Alice Montacute
23. Lady Eleanor Holland
1. George Hastings, 1st Earl of Huntingdon
24. Robert Hungerford, 2nd Baron Hungerford
12. Robert Hungerford, 3rd Baron Hungerford
25. Margaret de Botreaux
6. Thomas Hungerford of Rowden
26. Sir William Moleyns
13. Elizabeth Moleyns
27. Anne Whalesborough
3. Mary Hungerford
28. Henry Percy, 2nd Earl of Northumberland
14. Henry Percy, 3rd Earl of Northumberland
29. Lady Eleanor Nevill
7. Anne Percy
30. Sir Richard de Poynings
15. Eleanor de Poynings
31. Jean Seamer

== Notes ==
Peerage of England
| New title | Earl of Huntingdon; 1529–1544 | Succeeded by Francis Hastings |
| Preceded by Edward Hastings | Baron Hastings; 1506–1544 | Succeeded by Francis Hastings |
| Preceded by Mary Hungerford | Baron Botreaux; Baron Hungerford; Baron de Moleyns; 1520–1544 | Succeeded by Francis Hastings |
