= Anne Stafford, Countess of Huntingdon =

English noblewoman (c. 1483–1544)

The Right Honourable The Countess of Huntingdon
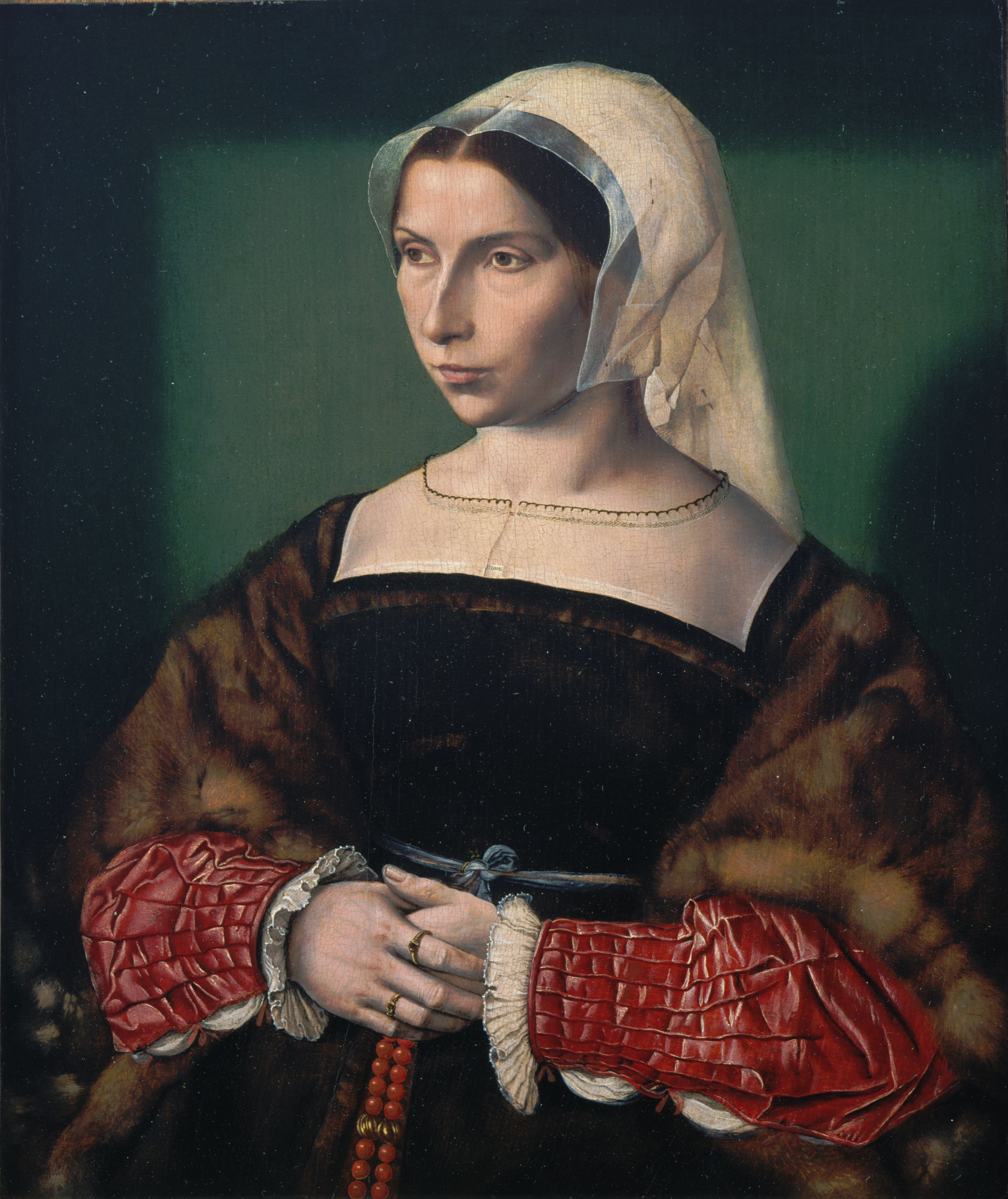
- Anne Stafford, c. 1535, by Ambrosius Benson
- Born: c. 1483
- Died: 1544 (aged 60–61); Buried at Stoke Poges, Buckinghamshire
- Noble family: Stafford (by birth); Huntingdon (by marriage)
- Spouses: Sir Walter Herbert (m. 1503; died 1507) George Hastings, 1st Earl of Huntingdon (m. 1509; died 1544)
- Issue: Francis Hastings, 2nd Earl of Huntingdon; Hon. Sir Thomas Hastings; Edward Hastings, 1st Baron Hastings of Loughborough; Hon. Henry Hastings; Hon. William Hastings; Lady Dorothy Hastings; Lady Mary Hastings; Lady Katherine Hastings
- Father: Henry Stafford, 2nd Duke of Buckingham
- Mother: Catherine Woodville

Anne Hastings, Countess of Huntingdon (née Anne Stafford) (c. 1483–1544) was an English noble. She was the daughter of Henry Stafford, 2nd Duke of Buckingham, and Catherine Woodville, sister of queen consort Elizabeth Woodville. She was first the wife of Sir Walter Herbert and then George Hastings, 1st Earl of Huntingdon, and served in the household of King Henry VIII's daughter, the future Queen Mary I.

== Life ==
Born around 1483, Anne Stafford was the daughter of Henry Stafford, 2nd Duke of Buckingham, and Catherine Woodville. Catherine was a sister of Elizabeth Woodville, Consort of Edward IV, making Anne a first cousin of Elizabeth of York. Anne had two brothers, Edward Stafford, 3rd Duke of Buckingham, and Henry Stafford, 1st Earl of Wiltshire; and a sister, Elizabeth Stafford, Countess of Sussex.

In 1483, Richard III executed her father for treason, following his part in the uprisings which became known as Buckingham's rebellion. Anne's mother remarried in 1485 to Jasper Tudor, later Duke of Bedford.

In 1503, Anne married Sir Walter Herbert. After Herbert died in 1507, Anne gave control of her jointure, which included Raglan Castle in Wales, to her brother, Edward. Anne went to live in her brother's household at Thornbury, Gloucestershire, until her second marriage to George Hastings in 1509.

In 1510, Anne was the subject of a sex scandal. Her brother had heard rumours that Anne was having an affair with Sir William Compton, who was close to Henry VIII; she had been one of Henry's mistresses. On one occasion, Stafford found Compton in Anne's room. Compton was forced to take the sacrament to prove that he had not committed adultery. Hastings sent Anne to live in a convent 60 miles (100 km) away from the royal court. There is no evidence that Anne and Compton committed adultery, nor that she was Henry VIII's mistress, aside from the illogical notion that Compton met her to hand her a message from the King, which he could easily have handed to her in a less scandalous way. However, in 1523 Compton took the unusual step of bequeathing land to Anne in his will, and directing his executors to include her in the prayers for his kin for which he had made provision in his will.

Despite this scandal, Anne and Hastings apparently enjoyed a close, loving relationship. This was evidenced by a letter written to Anne by Hastings in 1525 which has been described as 'one of the most affectionate and charming letters of the period'.

== Marriages and children ==
Anne Stafford married firstly, in 1503, Sir Walter Herbert (d. 16 September 1507), an illegitimate son of William Herbert, 1st Earl of Pembroke. The marriage was childless.

She married secondly, in December 1509, George Hastings, 1st Earl of Huntingdon. They had five sons and three daughters:

- Francis Hastings, 2nd Earl of Huntingdon, who married Katherine Pole (d. 23 September 1576), elder daughter of Henry Pole, 1st Baron Montagu, and by her had six sons, including Henry Hastings, 3rd Earl of Huntingdon, and George Hastings, 4th Earl of Huntingdon, and five daughters, including Frances, wife of Henry Compton, 1st Baron Compton.
- Sir Thomas Hastings, who married, before October 1553, Winifred Pole (d. 22 February 1602), daughter of Henry Pole, 1st Baron Montagu, and Jane Neville, daughter of George Neville, 5th Baron Bergavenny. There was no issue of the marriage. After Sir Thomas Hastings' death, Winifred Pole married Sir Thomas Barrington (d.1581).
- Edward Hastings, 1st Baron Hastings of Loughborough.
- Henry Hastings.
- William Hastings.
- Dorothy Hastings, who married Sir Richard Devereux (d.1548), second son of Walter Devereux, 1st Viscount Hereford, and Mary Grey, the daughter of Thomas Grey, 1st Marquess of Dorset. The eldest son of Walter Devereux, 1st Viscount Hereford, predeceased him, as did his second son, Sir Richard Devereux (d.1548). However Sir Richard Devereux and Dorothy Hastings had a son, Walter Devereux, 1st Earl of Essex, who was his grandfather's heir.
- Mary Hastings, who married Thomas Berkeley, 6th Baron Berkeley.
- Katherine Hastings.

== Fictional portrayals ==
- Anne is the protagonist of At the King's Pleasure by Kate Emerson.
- In two 2007 episodes of the Showtime television series, The Tudors, Anne, portrayed by Anna Brewster, is presented as the 3rd Duke of Buckingham's daughter (she was his sister), and is involved not with Henry VIII but with a fictionalised version of the King's future brother-in-law, Charles Brandon, 1st Duke of Suffolk. Several episodes later, a "Mistress Hastings" portrayed by Rachel Kavanagh is shown as dying of the same sweating sickness that killed William Compton. It is uncertain if both characters are an amalgamation of historical Anne Stafford.
- In the second season of the Starz TV series The Spanish Princess, Anne is played by actress Tessa Bonham Jones.
- Anne is a character in the Philippa Gregory novel, The Constant Princess.
