= Walter Devereux, 1st Viscount Hereford =

English courtier

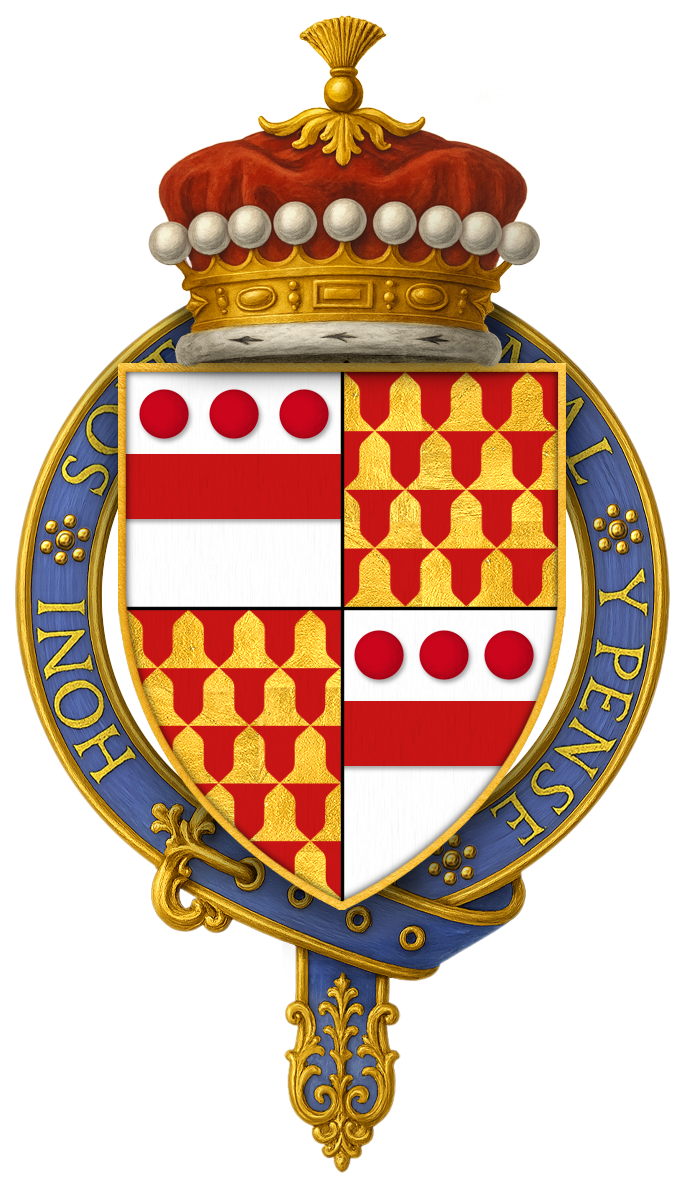
Arms of the 1st Viscount Hereford, KG

Walter Devereux, 10th Baron Ferrers of Chartley, created 1st Viscount Hereford (1488 – 17 September 1558) was an English courtier and parliamentarian.

== Baron Ferrers ==
Walter was the son and heir of John Devereux, 9th Baron Ferrers and Cecily Bourchier. In May 1501, his father died and Sir Walter succeeded him as the 10th Baron Ferrers, and succeeded to his father's lands in 1509.

He was appointed High Steward of Tamworth in 1510, and joint Constable of Warwick Castle along with Sir Edward Belknap in 1511. He was also Joint Steward of the manor, or borough of Warwick. In 1513, he was appointed Keeper of Netherwood Park and Councillor and Royal Commissioner of Wales and the Marches, and High Steward of Hereford the following year.

He served in the War of the League of Cambrai (1508–1516) and the Italian War of 1521-1526. He was Captain of the English Army against France from 24 August 1523. For his gallantry in the sea battle off Le Conquet (Brittany) he was rewarded on 13 July 1523 by being created a Knight of the Garter by Henry VIII of England.

In 1525, he was appointed High Steward of Sutton Coldfield and Buellt, Steward of the Household and Counsellor to Mary, Princess of Wales, Chief Justice of South Wales, and in 1526, Chamberlain of South Wales, Carmarthen and Cardigan. This last brought him, in the late 1520s, into increasing conflict with Welsh magnate Rhys ap Gruffydd, coming to a head when Rhys, accompanied by a gang of armed supporters, threatened Ferrers with a knife in 1529. The two men were allowed to air their grievances, but Rhys's family continued to stir up trouble. Eventually Rhys was charged with treason, convicted and executed. The consolidation of Devereux's position in Wales helped prepare the way for the Reformation.

Devereux served as Custos Rotulorum of Cardiganshire from 1543 to his death. He was with King Henry VIII when Boulogne was taken on 18 September 1544.

Created Viscount Hereford on 2 February 1550, as well as sworn of the Privy Council, he would also be appointed Vice-Lord Justice and Lieutenant of Stafford in 1551 and Justice of the Peace for Stafford, Worcester and Salop in 1554.

Lord Hereford died on 17 September 1558, and is buried at St. John's Church, Stowe, Staffordshire, being succeeded by his grandson, Walter Devereux, later Earl of Essex

== Marriages and children ==
Devereux was first married in May 1501 to Lady Mary Grey (1491- 22 February 1538), later being pardoned for having married in his father's lifetime and when under age. She was a daughter of Thomas Grey, 1st Marquess of Dorset and his second wife Cecily, suo jure Baroness Harington and Bonville.

Lord and Lady Ferrers had three children:

1. Sir Richard Devereux, who died before his father. He married Lady Dorothea Hastings, daughter of the 1st Earl of Huntingdon and Lady Anne née Stafford. They were parents to Walter Devereux, 1st Earl of Essex.
2. Sir William Devereux, of Merevale Abbey, married Jane Scudamore, daughter of John Scudamore MP.
3. Henry Devereux, died unmarried.

Either in 1539 or 1540–1, Walter married secondly to Margaret Garneys, daughter of Sir John Garneys, of Kenton. They had two children:

1. Sir Edward Devereux, of Castle Bromwich, married Catherine Arden. They were parents of Walter Devereux, 5th Viscount Hereford, ancestors of the present Viscount Hereford.
2. Katherine Devereux, married Sir James Baskerville.

Ancestors of Walter Devereux, 1st Viscount Hereford

8. Sir Walter Devereux
4. Walter Devereux, 8th Baron Ferrers of Chartley
9. Elizabeth Merbury
2. John Devereux, 9th Baron Ferrers of Chartley
10. William de Ferrers, 7th Baron Ferrers of Chartley
5. Anne Ferrers
11. Elizabeth Ferrers
1. Walter Devereux, 1st Viscount Hereford
12. Henry Bourchier, 1st Earl of Essex
6. William Bourchier, Viscount Bourchier
13. Isabel of Cambridge, Countess of Essex
3. Cecily Bourchier
14. Richard Woodville, 1st Earl Rivers
7. Anne Woodville
15. Jacquetta of Luxembourg

Honorary titles
Preceded by Uncertain	Custos Rotulorum of Cardiganshire; 1543–1558	Succeeded by John Price
Peerage of England
New creation	Viscount Hereford; 1550–1558	Succeeded by Walter Devereux
Preceded by John Devereux	Baron Ferrers of Chartley; 1501–1558	Succeeded by Walter Devereux
