= John Devereux, 9th Baron Ferrers of Chartley =

English Baron

- Baron Ferrers of Chartley
- Tenure: 22 August 1485 – 3 or 7 May 1501
- Predecessor: Walter Devereux, Lord Ferrers of Chartley
- Successor: Walter Devereux, 1st Viscount Hereford
- Born: c. 1464; Chartley, Staffordshire, England
- Died: 3 or 7 May 1501; Chartley, Staffordshire, England
- Residence: Chartley Castle
- Spouse(s): Cecily Bourchier; Elizabeth Langham
- Issue: Walter Devereux, 1st Viscount Hereford; Anne
- Parents: Walter Devereux, Lord Ferrers of Chartley; Anne Ferrers

John Devereux, 9th Baron Ferrers of Chartley (c. 1464 – 3 or 7 May 1501) was an English peer.

== Family ==
He was born about 1464, the eldest son and heir of Walter Devereux, Lord Ferrers of Chartley, by Anne Ferrers, heiress of the earlier Barons Ferrers of Chartley. His father died at the Battle of Bosworth on 22 August 1485, fighting for King Richard III of England under John Howard, 1st Duke of Norfolk. King Richard III was killed in the battle and his opponent succeeded him as King Henry VII of England, causing Walter to be attainted, his lands forfeited.

== Career ==
In 1486, John succeeded to his mother's properties, which had been held for life by his father. He was summoned to Parliament on 1 September 1487 as Baron Ferrers, and there he petitioned for the reversal of the attainder of his father, which was granted, allowing him in 1489 to succeed to his father's lands, excepting those still held for life by his father's widow. He would remain loyal to Henry VII for the rest of his life.

== Family ==
John was first married to Cecily Bourchier. She was a daughter of William Bourchier, Viscount Bourchier and Lady Anne Woodville.

The Baron and his first wife had two children:

- Walter Devereux, 1st Viscount Hereford (1488 – 17 September 1558)
- Anne Devereux (born c. 1490), married (1st) Sir David (or Davy) Owen, (2nd) Nicholas Gaynesford and (3rd) John Harman.

His first wife died before June 1493, being buried in St. Michael Paternoster Royal Churchyard in London, and John married secondly to Elizabeth Langham, daughter of Robert Langham.

John died on either 3 or 7 May 1501, and was succeeded by his son Walter.

Peerage of England
Preceded by Walter Devereux	Baron Ferrers of Chartley; 1485–1501	Succeeded by Walter Devereux
