= George Hastings, 4th Earl of Huntingdon =

English nobleman (1540–1604)

The Right Honourable George Hastings
- The Earl of Huntingdon
- Coat of arms
- Tenure: 1595–1604
- Predecessor: Henry Hastings, 3rd Earl of Huntingdon
- Successor: Henry Hastings, 5th Earl of Huntingdon
- Born: 1540
- Died: 30 December 1604 (aged 63–64)
- Spouse: Dorothy Port
- Issue: Francis Hastings, Lord Hastings; Hon. Henry Hastings; Hon. Sir Edward Hastings; Lady Catherine Hastings; Lady Dorothy Hastings
- Father: Francis Hastings, 2nd Earl of Huntingdon
- Mother: Catherine Pole

George Hastings, 4th Earl of Huntingdon (1540 – 30 December 1604) was an English nobleman.

He was a son of Francis Hastings, 2nd Earl of Huntingdon and Catherine Pole, daughter of Henry Pole, 1st Baron Montagu and Jane Neville. He was a younger brother of Henry Hastings, 3rd Earl of Huntingdon, and older brother of Francis Hastings. He succeeded Henry as the 4th Earl.

He was High Sheriff of Leicestershire in 1571 and knight of the shire (MP) for Derbyshire in 1562 and Leicestershire in 1584–1587. He was invested as a knight in 1565. They lived at Gopsall and then Loughborough, both in Leicestershire.

He hosted Anne of Denmark and her children Prince Henry and Princess Elizabeth at Ashby-de-la-Zouch on 22 June 1603. Huntingdon was anxious for the queen to visit and enlisted the Earl of Shrewsbury's steward Richard Bainbrigg and others to make his case that the royal party should come to Ashby Castle from Wollaton Hall.

He was succeeded by his grandson Henry Hastings, 5th Earl of Huntingdon.

He died in 1604.

== Marriage ==
George married Dorothy Port, daughter and co-heiress of Sir John Port of Etwall, Derbyshire. They had five children:

- Francis Hastings, Baron Hastings (1560–1595), who was father to Henry Hastings, 5th Earl of Huntingdon.
- Henry Hastings (1562 – 5 October 1650).
- Sir Edward Hastings.
- Catherine Hastings. Married first Sir Walter Chetwynd and secondly Sir Edward Unton. Her second husband was a son of Edward Unton and Anne Seymour. Anne was a daughter of Edward Seymour, 1st Duke of Somerset, and Anne Stanhope.
- Dorothy Hastings, was a Maid of Honour at court. She married a Scottish courtier, James Stewart, a son of Walter Stewart of Blantyre. Her second husband was Robert Dillon, 2nd Earl of Roscommon.

Political offices
Preceded by The Earl of Huntingdon	Custos Rotulorum of Leicestershire; 1595–1604	Succeeded by Sir Henry Beaumont
Preceded by The Earl of Huntingdon	Lord Lieutenant of Leicestershire; 1596–1604	Vacant Title next held by The Earl of Huntingdon
Preceded by The Earl of Huntingdon	Lord Lieutenant of Rutland; 1596–1604	Vacant Title next held by The Lord Harington of Exton
New creation	Member of Parliament for Derbyshire; 1562	Succeeded by Sir William de Loe
Peerage of England
Preceded by Henry Hastings	Earl of Huntingdon; 1595–1604	Succeeded by Henry Hastings
