= Henry Hastings, 3rd Earl of Huntingdon =

English noble (1535–1595)

- Earl of Huntingdon
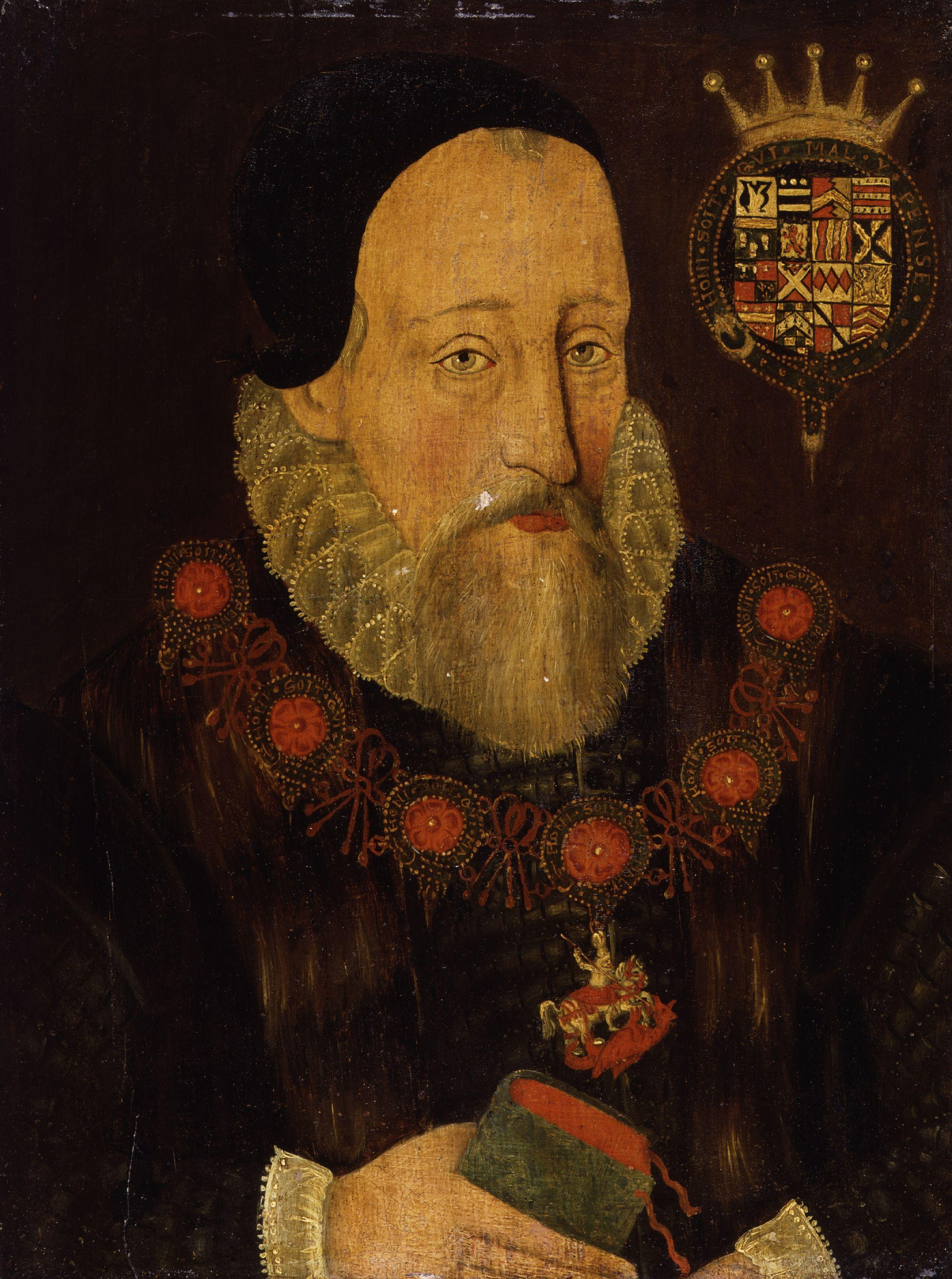
- The Earl of Huntingdon
- Successor: George Hastings, 4th Earl of Huntingdon
- Other titles: Baron Hastings
- Born: 1535; Ashby-de-la-Zouch, Leicestershire, England
- Died: 14 December 1595 (aged 59/60); York, England
- Buried: St Helen's Church, Ashby-de-la-Zouch
- Spouse: Lady Katherine Dudley
- Parents: Francis Hastings, 2nd Earl of Huntingdon; Catherine Pole
- Occupation: Administrator, diplomat, and military commander

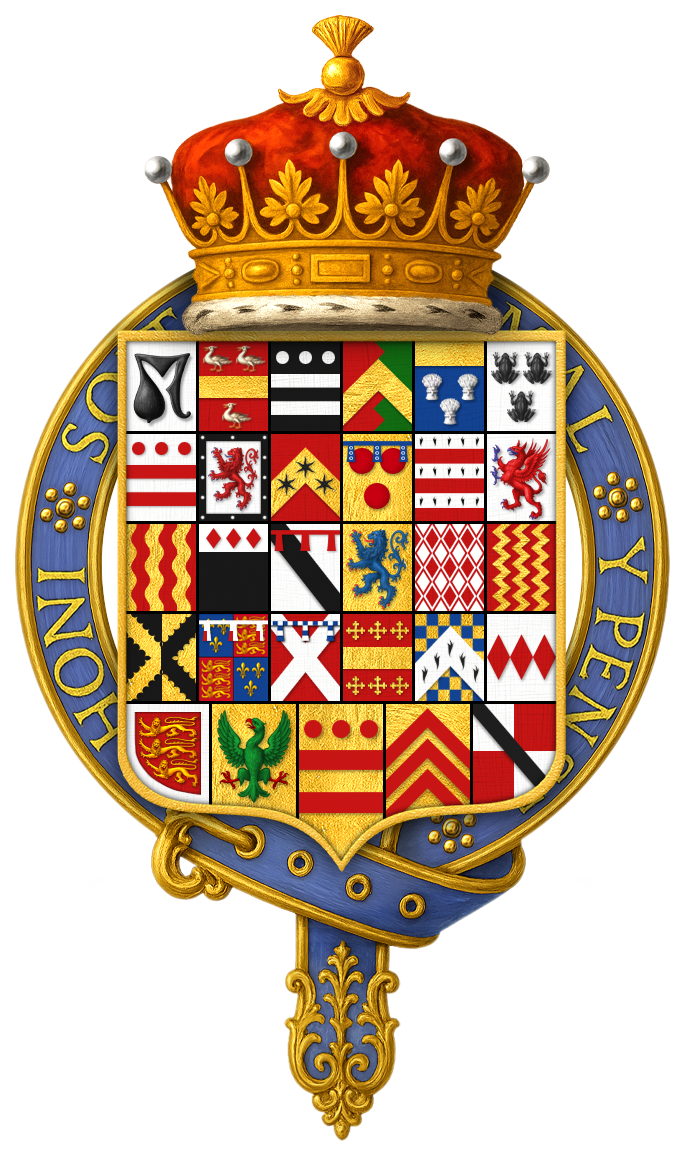
Quartered arms of the 3rd Earl of Huntingdon, as displayed on his Garter stallplate in St. George's Chapel.

Henry Hastings, 3rd Earl of Huntingdon (c. 1535 – 14 December 1595) was an English Puritan nobleman. Educated alongside the future Edward VI, he was briefly imprisoned by Mary I, and later considered by some as a potential successor to Elizabeth I. He hotly opposed the scheme to marry Mary, Queen of Scots, to the Duke of Norfolk, and was entrusted by Elizabeth to see that the Scottish queen did not escape at the time of the threatened uprising in 1569. He served as President of the Council of the North from 1572 until his death in 1595.

== Early life ==
=== Education ===
Hastings was born in Ashby-de-la-Zouch, Leicestershire, the eldest son of Francis Hastings, 2nd Earl of Huntingdon, and Catherine Pole in 1535 or 1536. Through his mother, he was descended from George Plantagenet, 1st Duke of Clarence, who was a brother of King Edward IV. This gave him some claim to the throne. Hastings was educated at first by private tutors at his family manor. A year or so senior to Edward VI, Hastings joined the young prince at his studies at the king's invitation. He was tutored under Richard Cox, John Cheke and Jean Belmain. They provided both youths with an education based on a Protestant version of the principles of Renaissance Humanism. In 1548 he spent a brief period at Queens' College, Cambridge, profoundly influenced by the evangelical Protestantism he encountered at court and at the university.

=== Marriage and imprisonment in the Tower of London ===
His father was a political ally of John Dudley, 1st Duke of Northumberland, and to further their alliance the two elder politicians arranged the marriage of their children. On 21 May 1553, Henry was wed to Katherine Dudley, daughter of Northumberland by Jane Guildford.

In 1553, Edward VI was dying and his appointed heir was his cousin Lady Jane Grey, Northumberland's daughter-in-law. Jane's reign lasted only from 10 to 19 July 1553 until her cousin Mary I of England prevailed. Due to his marital alliance, Henry backed Northumberland in his attempt to divert the succession in favour of Lady Jane Grey in July 1553, and on Mary Tudor's triumph he found himself incarcerated in the Tower of London. Mary attempted to reconcile with the Hastings family and soon they were free again and by oath loyal to her.

Henry entered the household of his great-uncle Cardinal Reginald Pole and followed him in his visits to Calais, Flanders and the monasteries of Smithfield, London. The two men also escorted the later Philip II of Spain from the Seventeen Provinces to the Kingdom of England for his marriage to Mary. Despite his personal loyalty to Mary and his great-uncle, Hastings practised Calvinism and showed little financial restraint in supporting his puritan beliefs. Among those notables who benefited from his family's friendship and patronage were John Brinsley the elder, Arthur Hildersham, Thomas Cartwright, Lawrence Humphrey, Thomas Sampson, Anthony Gilby, John King, and William Chaderton.

== Political career ==
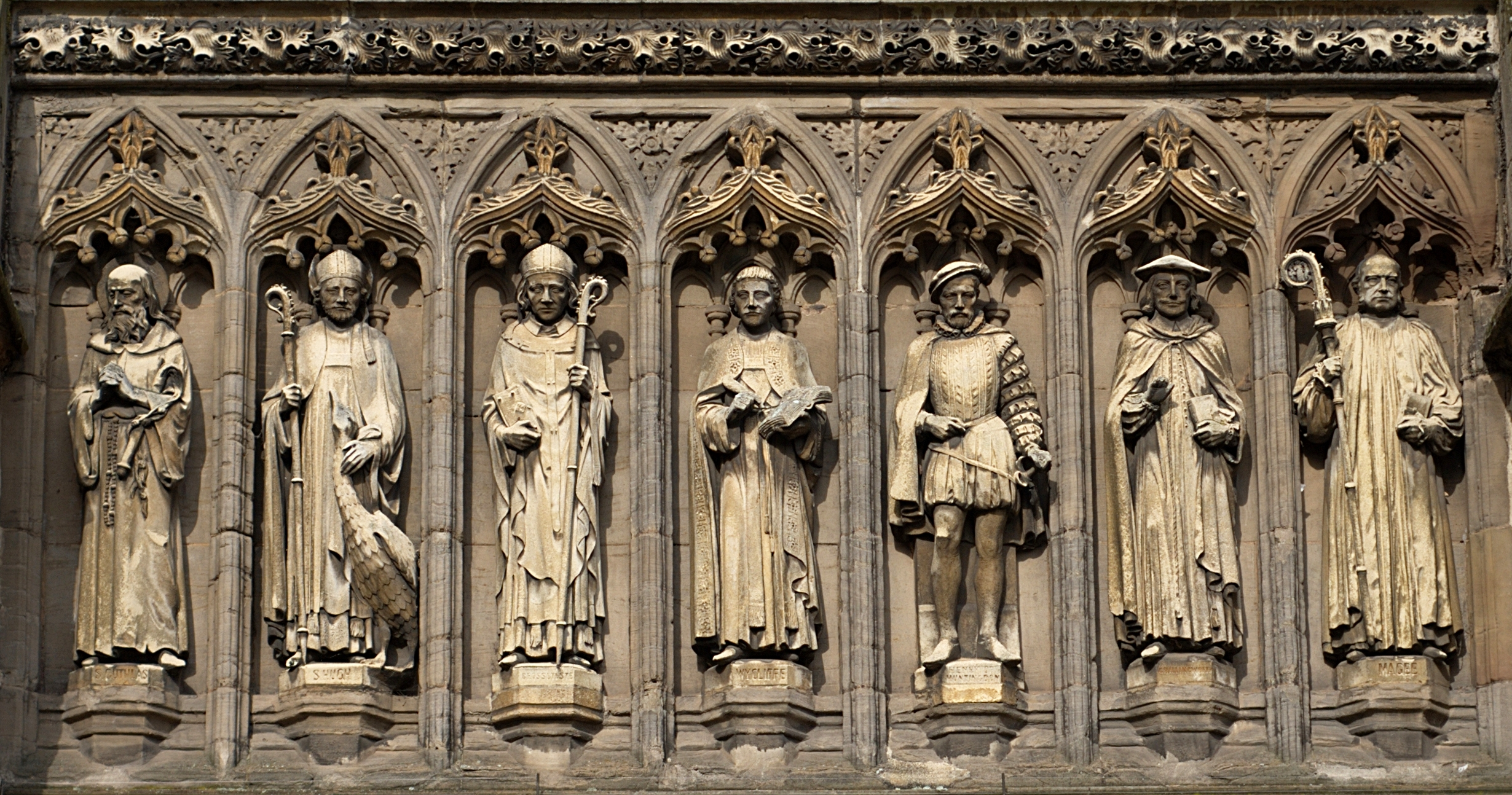
Detail from the Vaughan Porch of Leicester Cathedral. The Earl of Huntingdon is 3rd from the right

He had been loyal to Edward VI, Jane and Mary I during their respective reigns and his father remained an influential politician. When Mary I died childless and was succeeded by her younger half-sister Elizabeth I in 1558, the new queen also counted on the reliable Hastings family among her supporters. Together with the second earl, Lord Hastings received a summons to the Lords in the first parliament of Elizabeth, and attended assiduously, being present (among much else) at the passage of the Acts of Supremacy and Uniformity in the spring of 1559. Henry was named a Knight of the Bath by the new queen regnant.

His father died on 25 January 1560 and Henry became the third Earl of Huntingdon. He thus assumed responsibility for his widowed mother and his ten siblings.

=== Stunted rise to power ===
With his humanist education, experience of court life, and a brother-in-law, Robert Dudley, high in the new queen's favour, Huntingdon might well have expected early advancement. However, at the time few members of the Tudor dynasty remained alive and several descendants of the previous English royal house of Plantagenet were seen as possible heirs to the throne. Huntingdon was among these possible heirs and won a certain amount of support, especially from the Protestants and the enemies of another claimant Mary, Queen of Scots. Huntingdon soon discovered that his Yorkist ancestry barred his way. Indeed, when Elizabeth fell ill with smallpox in October 1562, the Protestant group put him forward as a potential successor and, though he subsequently did all in his power to convince her of his loyalty, the queen proved very slow thereafter to employ him outside his native county of Leicestershire.

=== President of the Council of the North ===
However, he was still useful to her. It was doubtless felt that the earl's own title to the crown was a pledge that he would show scant sympathy with the advocates of Mary's claim. For three months during the northern uprising in the autumn of 1569, he assisted George Talbot, 6th Earl of Shrewsbury to remove the Scottish queen from Wingfield Manor to Tutbury. He is often mentioned - negatively - in coded letters from Mary, Queen of Scots, to the French ambassador. He was later one of the peers at her trial in 1586.

Elizabeth formally recognised his service by creating him a Knight of the Garter in April 1570 alongside William Somerset, 3rd Earl of Worcester, and from this time seems to have regarded him as a candidate for promotion. The rebellion of the earls had demonstrated the ineffectiveness of Thomas Radcliffe, 3rd Earl of Sussex as president of the council in the north, in 1572 Huntingdon was appointed president of the Council of the North. Throughout the period the north of England stood as a buffer zone against Scotland, still in a highly volatile state after Mary's flight.

He was prominent and active in the preparations of 1588 for the Spanish invasion.

== Later life ==
Having gone north to Newcastle to oversee the musters in the autumn of 1595, Huntingdon planned to join his wife at court for Christmas. On his return to York in late November, however, he fell ill with a fever and died there on 14 December 1595.

At court, Elizabeth went out of her way to comfort his distraught widow, though she did little to mitigate the debts. Childless, Huntingdon had educated Francis Hastings, the eldest son of his brother, Sir George Hastings, as his heir, sending him for a time to Geneva. Francis's ten-year-old son Henry was being brought up in his great-uncle's household at York in 1595. Since his brother had died intestate, George, fourth earl of Huntingdon, tried to avoid taking up the administration of his estate, but the queen insisted upon Huntingdon's being given a funeral commensurate with his rank, and he was buried with his nephew, Francis, who only outlived him by three days, at St Helen's Church, Ashby-de-la-Zouch, on 26 April 1596.

A portrait of Huntingdon in armour dated 1588 now hangs in the Tower. Huntingdon was responsible for the compilation of an elaborate history of the Hastings family, a manuscript copy of which is now in the British Museum.

== Notes ==
Political offices
Preceded by The Earl of Huntingdon	Lord Lieutenant of Leicestershire; 1559–1587 with the Earl of Huntingdon (1559–1561)	Succeeded by The Earl of Huntingdon
Preceded by Francis Cave	Custos Rotulorum of Leicestershire bef. 1573–1595	Succeeded by The Earl of Huntingdon
First known holder	Lord Lieutenant of Rutland ?–1595	Succeeded by The Earl of Huntingdon
First known holder	Lord Lieutenant of Yorkshire; 1586–1595	Vacant Title next held by The Lord Burghley
First known holder	Lord Lieutenant of Cumberland, Northumberland and Westmorland; 1586–1595	Vacant Title next held by The Earl of Cumberland
Peerage of England
Preceded by Francis Hastings	Earl of Huntingdon; 1560–1595	Succeeded by George Hastings
Preceded by Francis Hastings	Baron Hastings (writ in acceleration); 1559–1595	Succeeded by George Hastings
