= Duke of Exeter =

Title of nobility

The title Duke of Exeter was created several times in England in the later Middle Ages. Exeter is the main town of Devon. It was first created for John Holland, the half-brother of King Richard II in 1397. That title was rescinded upon Henry IV's accession to the throne two years later. The title was then granted to the former's half-brother, Thomas Beaufort, 1st Earl of Dorset by his nephew Henry V. Following Beaufort's death without heirs in 1426, the title was restored to the Holland family, which held it until the 3rd Duke was attainted in 1461 as a Lancastrian, dying in 1475.

== Dukes of Exeter, first creation (1397) ==
Coat of arms of the Dukes of Exeter of the Holland family

- John Holland, 1st Duke of Exeter (1352–1400), half-brother of Richard II, was executed for treason against his half-brother's cousin and rival Henry IV Bolingbroke, at which point his honours were deprived.

=== Coat of arms ===
- Arms: The arms of England (gules, three lions passant or), within a border azure, charged with fleur-de-lis of the second.
- Crest: The royal lion on a chapeau, gorged with a collar azure, charged with fleurs-de-lis, and ducally crowned.

== Dukes of Exeter, second creation (1416) ==
Coat of arms of Thomas Beaufort (1377–1427), Duke of Exeter, and son of John of Gaunt, Duke of Lancaster

- Thomas Beaufort, Duke of Exeter (c. 1377–1426), third legitimated son of John of Gaunt, Duke of Lancaster (himself the third son of Edward III), died without issue, thus the dukedom was extinct.

=== Coat of arms ===
- Arms: The arms of England (quarterly: first and fourth, azure, three fleurs-de-lis; second and third, gules, three lions passant or), within a border gobony azure and ermine.
- Crest: A portcullis or, nailed azure, chains of the first.

== Dukes of Exeter, third creation (1444) ==
Sometimes numbered 2nd and 3rd dukes in reference to the 1397 creation

- John Holland, 2nd Duke of Exeter, 1st in this creation (1395–1447), son of the 1st Duke of the 1397 creation, was restored to his father's honours after service to his cousin, the Lancastrian king, Henry V
- Henry Holland, 3rd Duke of Exeter, 2nd in this creation (1430–1475), son of preceding, titles forfeited 1461

=== Coat of arms ===
As the first creation above.

== Family tree ==
Duke of Exeter, Marquesses of Northampton, Earls of Huntingdon, and Earls of Wilmington family tree

Robert; 1000–1035; Duke of Normandy
Adelaide of Normandy c. 1030–before 1090; Countess of Aumale	William the Conqueror c. 1028–1087; King of England
Earl of Huntingdon (1st creation), 1065; Earl of Northampton (1st creation), 1071
Waltheof d. 1076; Earl of Northumbria, 1st Earl of Huntingdon, 1st Earl of Northampton	Judith of Lens; 1054/1055–c. 1090
David I c. 1084–1153; King of Alba	Maud c. 1074–1130; 2nd Countess of Huntingdon, 2nd Countess of Northampton, Queen of Scotland	Simon I de Senlis d. 1111–1113; 2nd Earl of Huntingdon, 2nd Earl of Northampton jure uxoris
Henry of Scotland; 1114–1152; 3rd Earl of Huntingdon, Earl of Northumbria	Simon II de Senlis c. 1098–1153; 4th Earl of Huntingdon, 3rd Earl of Northampton
Malcolm IV; 1141–1165; King of Alba, 5th Earl of Huntingdon	William I (the Lion) c. 1142–1214; King of Alba, 6th Earl of Huntingdon	David; 1152–1219; 8th Earl of Huntingdon, Earl of Northumbria	Simon III de Senlis c. 1138–1184; 7th Earl of Huntingdon, 4th Earl of Northampton
Earldom of Northampton (1st creation) reverted to the Crown, 1184
John of Scotland; 1207–1237; 9th Earl of Huntingdon, Earl of Chester
Earldom of Huntingdon (1st creation) extinct, 1237 and later reverted to the Crown
Earl of Huntingdon (2nd creation), 1337
William de Clinton c. 1304–1354; Earl of Huntingdon, Baron Clinton
Earl of Northampton (2nd creation), 1337	Earldom of Huntingdon (2nd creation) extinct, 1354	Earl of Huntingdon (3rd creation for life), 1377
William de Bohun c. 1312 – 1373; Earl of Hereford, Earl of Essex, 1st Earl of Northampton	Edward III; 1312–1377; King of England	Guichard (IV) d'Angle c. 1305/1315–1380; Earl of Huntingdon
Earldom of Huntingdon (3rd creation) extinct, 1380
Humphrey de Bohun; 1342–1373; Earl of Hereford, Earl of Essex, 2nd Earl of Northampton	Joan of Kent c. 1328–1385	Edward of Woodstock "The Black Prince; 1330–1376	John of Gaunt; 1340–1399; Duke of Lancaster	Thomas of Woodstock; 1355–1397; Duke of Gloucester
Earldom of Northampton (2nd creation) abeyant, 1373
Earl of Huntingdon (4th creation), 1388; Duke of Exeter (1st creation), 1397	Earl of Northampton (2nd creation restored), 1384	Duke of Exeter (2nd creation), 1416	Earl of Northampton (3rd creation), 1399
John Holland c. 1352–1400; 1st Duke of Exeter, 1st Earl of Huntingdon	Richard II; 1367–c. 1400; King of England	Henry Bolingbroke c. 1367 – 1413; 3rd Earl of Northampton, later King Henry IV	Thomas Beaufort c. 1377–1426; Duke of Exeter; Earl of Dorset	Anne of Gloucester; 1383–1438; Countess of Northampton
Dukedom of Exeter (1st creation) and Earldom of Huntingdon (4th creation) forfeit, 1400	Earldom of Northampton (2nd creation) merged in the crown, 1399	Dukedom of Exeter (2nd creation) extinct, 1426	Earldom of Northampton (3rd creation) extinct, 1438
Earldom of Huntingdon (4th creation) restored, 1416; Duke of Exeter (1st creation restored or 3rd creation), 1444
John Holland; 1395–1447; 2nd Duke of Exeter, 2nd Earl of Huntingdon
Henry Holland; 1430–1475; 3rd Duke of Exeter, 3rd Earl of Huntingdon	Edward IV; 1421–1471; King of England	Elizabeth Woodville c. 1437–1492
Dukedom of Exeter (1st/3rd creation) and Earldom of Huntingdon (4th creation) forfeit, 1461
Earl of Huntingdon (5th creation), 1471	Earl of Huntingdon (6th creation), 1479
Thomas Grey; 1455–1501; Earl of Huntingdon, Marquess of Dorset	Mary Woodville c. 1456–1481	William Herbert; 1451–1491; Earl of Huntingdon, Earl of Pembroke
Earldom of Huntingdon (5th creation) surrendered, 1475	Earldom of Huntingdon (6th creation) extinct, 1491
Earl of Huntingdon (7th creation), 1529
George Hastings; 1488–1544; 1st Earl of Huntingdon
Baron Parr of Kendall, 1539; Marquess of Northampton (1st creation), Baron Hart, 1543	Baron Hastings of Loughborough, 1558
Henry VIII; 1491–1547; King of England	Catherine Parr; 1512–1548	William Parr; 1513–1571; Marquess of Northampton, Earl of Essex, 1st Baron Parr, 1st Baron Hart	Francis Hastings; 1514–1561; 2nd Earl of Huntingdon	Edward Hastings c. 1521–1572; Baron Hastings of Loughborough
Marquessate of Northampton (1st creation), Earldom of Essex (7th creation) forfeit, 1554; restored, 1559; extinct, 1571	Barony Hastings of Loughborough extinct, 1572
Earl of Northampton, (4th creation), 1604	Baron Compton, 1572
Henry Howard; 1540–1614; Earl of Northampton	Henry Compton; 1544–1589; 1st Baron Compton	Frances Anne Hastings; 1533–1574	Henry Hastings; 1536–1595; 3rd Earl of Huntingdon	George Hastings; 1540–1604; 4th Earl of Huntingdon	Edward Hastings; 1541–1603
Earldom of Northampton (4th creation) extinct, 1614
Earl of Northampton (5th creation), 1618
William Compton d. 1630; 1st Earl of Northampton, 2nd Baron Compton	Francis Hastings; 1560–1595	Henry c. 1555–1640
Henry Hastings; 1586–1643; 5th Earl of Huntingdon
Spencer Compton; 1601–1643; 2nd Earl of Northampton, 3rd Baron Compton	Ferdinando Hastings; 1609–1656; 6th Earl of Huntingdon	Henry b. 1605
James Compton; 1622–1681; 3rd Earl of Northampton, 4th Baron Compton	Theophilus Hastings; 1650–1701; 7th Earl of Huntingdon	Richard; 1645–1714
Baron Wilmington, 1728; Earl of Wilmington and Viscount Pevensey, 1730
George Compton; 1664–1727; 4th Earl of Northampton, 5th Baron Compton	Spencer Compton c. 1674 – 1743; Earl of Wilmington, Viscount Pevensey, Baron Wilmington	George Hastings; 1677–1705; 8th Earl of Huntingdon
Earldom of Wilmington, Vicountcy Pevensey, and Barony Wilmington extinct, 1743
James Compton; 1687–1754; 5th Earl of Northampton, 6th Baron Compton	George Compton; 1692–1758; 6th Earl of Northampton	Charles Compton	Theophilus Hastings c. 1696–1746; 9th Earl of Huntingdon	Henry; 1701–1786
Charlotte Townshend d. 1770; Viscountess Townshend, Baroness Ferrers of Chartley, 7th Baroness Compton	Charles Compton; 1737–1763; 7th Earl of Northampton	Francis Hastings; 1729–1789; 10th Earl of Huntingdon	Theophilus Hastings; 1728–1804; 11th Earl of Huntingdon de jure	George; 1735–1802
Earldom of Huntingdon dormant/abeyant, 1804
George Townshend; 1753–1811; Marquess Townshend, Earl of Leicester, Viscount Townshend, Baron Townshend, Baron Ferrers of Chartley, 8th Baron Compton	Spencer Compton; 1760–1828; 8th Earl of Northampton
Marquess of Northampton (2nd creation), Earl Compton and Baron Wilmington, 1812	Earldom of Huntingdon claim restored, 1819
George Townshend (1778–1885); Marquess Townshend, Earl of Leicester, Viscount Townshend, Baron Townshend, Baron Ferrers of Chartley, 9th Baron Compton	Charles Compton; 1760–1828; 1st Marquess of Northampton, etc., 9th Earl of Northampton	Hans "Francis" Hastings; 1779–1828; 12th Earl of Huntingdon
Barony Compton abeyant, 1855
Spencer Joshua Alwyne Compton; 1790–1851; 2nd Marquess of Northampton, etc., 10th Earl of Northampton
Charles Douglas-Compton; 1816–1877; 3rd Marquess of Northampton, etc., 11th Earl of Northampton	William Compton; 1818–1897; 4th Marquess of Northampton, etc., 12th Earl of Northampton	Francis Theophilus Henry Hastings; 1808–1875; 13th Earl of Huntingdon	George; 1814–1876
Francis Power Plantagenet Hastings; 1841–1885; 14th Earl of Huntingdon
William George Spencer Scott Compton; 1851–1913; 5th Marquess of Northampton, etc., 13th Earl of Northampton	Warner Francis John Plantagenet Hastings; 1868–1939; 15th Earl of Huntingdon	Aubrey; 1878–1929	Hans; 1865–1933
William Bingham Compton; 1885–1978; 6th Marquess of Northampton, etc., 14th Earl of Northampton	Francis John Clarence Westenra Plantagenet Hastings; 1901–1990; 16th Earl of Huntingdon	Peter Hastings-Bass; 1920–1964	George; 1905–1981
Spencer Douglas David Compton b. 1946; 7th Marquess of Northampton, etc., 15th Earl of Northampton	William Edward Robin Hood Hastings-Bass b. 1948; 17th Earl of Huntingdon	John Hastings-Bass b. 1954	George; 1938–2005
Heir presumptive to the Earldom of Huntingdon
Daniel Bingham Compton b. 1973 styled Earl Compton	Adam b. 1977
Heir apparent to the Marquessate of Northampton	Second Heir presumptive to the Earldom of Huntingdon

== See also ==
- Marquess of Exeter
