= Countess of Huntingdon =

Countess of Huntingdon may refer to:

- Judith of Lens, Countess of Huntingdon and Northumbria (1054/55–c. 1090)
- Maud, Countess of Huntingdon (c. 1074–1130)
- Matilda of Chester, Countess of Huntingdon (1171–1233)
- Mary Woodville, Countess of Huntingdon (c. 1456–1481)
- Anne Hastings, Countess of Huntingdon (c. 1483–1544)
- Katherine Hastings, Countess of Huntingdon (1540s–1620)
- Elizabeth Hastings, Countess of Huntingdon (1588–1633)
- Lucy Hastings, Countess of Huntingdon (1613–1679)
- Selina Hastings, Countess of Huntingdon (1707–1791)

== See also ==
- Earl of Huntingdon
