= Fotheringhay Castle =

Ruined castle in Fotheringhay, England

Coordinates: 52.5243°N 0.4362°W

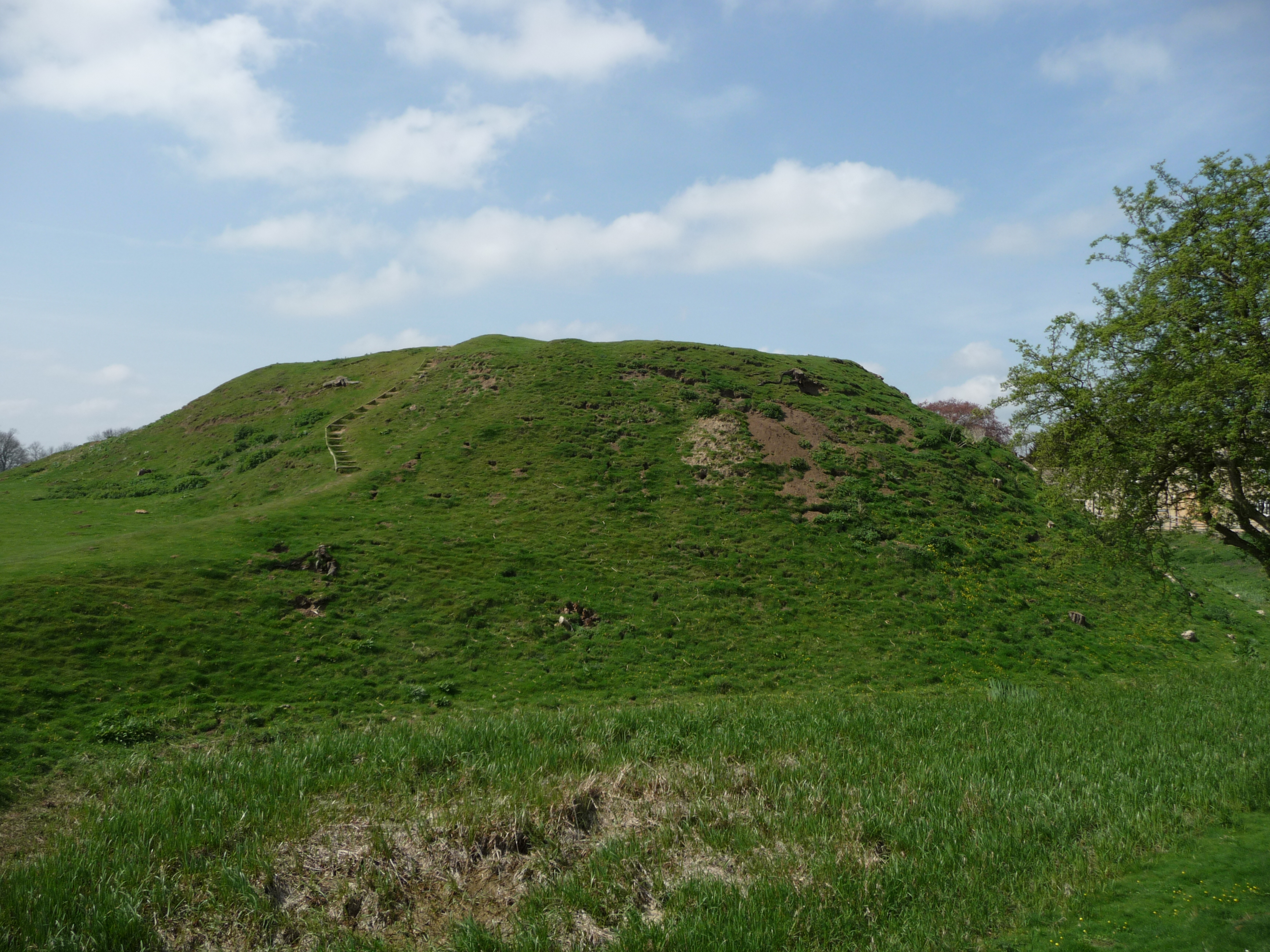
The motte of Fotheringhay Castle

Fotheringhay Castle, also known as Fotheringay Castle, was a High Middle Age Norman Motte-and-bailey castle in the village of Fotheringhay 3 1/2 miles (6 kilometres) to the north of the market town of Oundle, Northamptonshire, England (grid reference TL061930). It was probably founded around 1100 by Simon de Senlis, Earl of Northampton. In 1113, possession passed to Prince David of Scotland when he married Simon's widow. The castle then descended with the Scottish princes until the early 13th century, when it was confiscated by King John of England.

By 1220, Fotheringhay Castle was controlled by Ranulf de Blondeville, 6th Earl of Chester. In January the following year, it was briefly captured by William II de Forz, 3rd Earl of Albemarle, in his rebellion against King Henry III. Forz abandoned the castle, Henry III took it under his control, and Fotheringhay remained in royal hands until the reign of Edward II. It was a favoured residence of the Dukes of York, and King Richard III was born there in 1452. It was also the final place of imprisonment of Mary, Queen of Scots, who was tried and executed in the castle in 1587.

The castle was dismantled in the 1630s and most of the masonry was removed, leaving only the earthworks. The site is protected as a Scheduled Monument and is open to the public.

== History ==
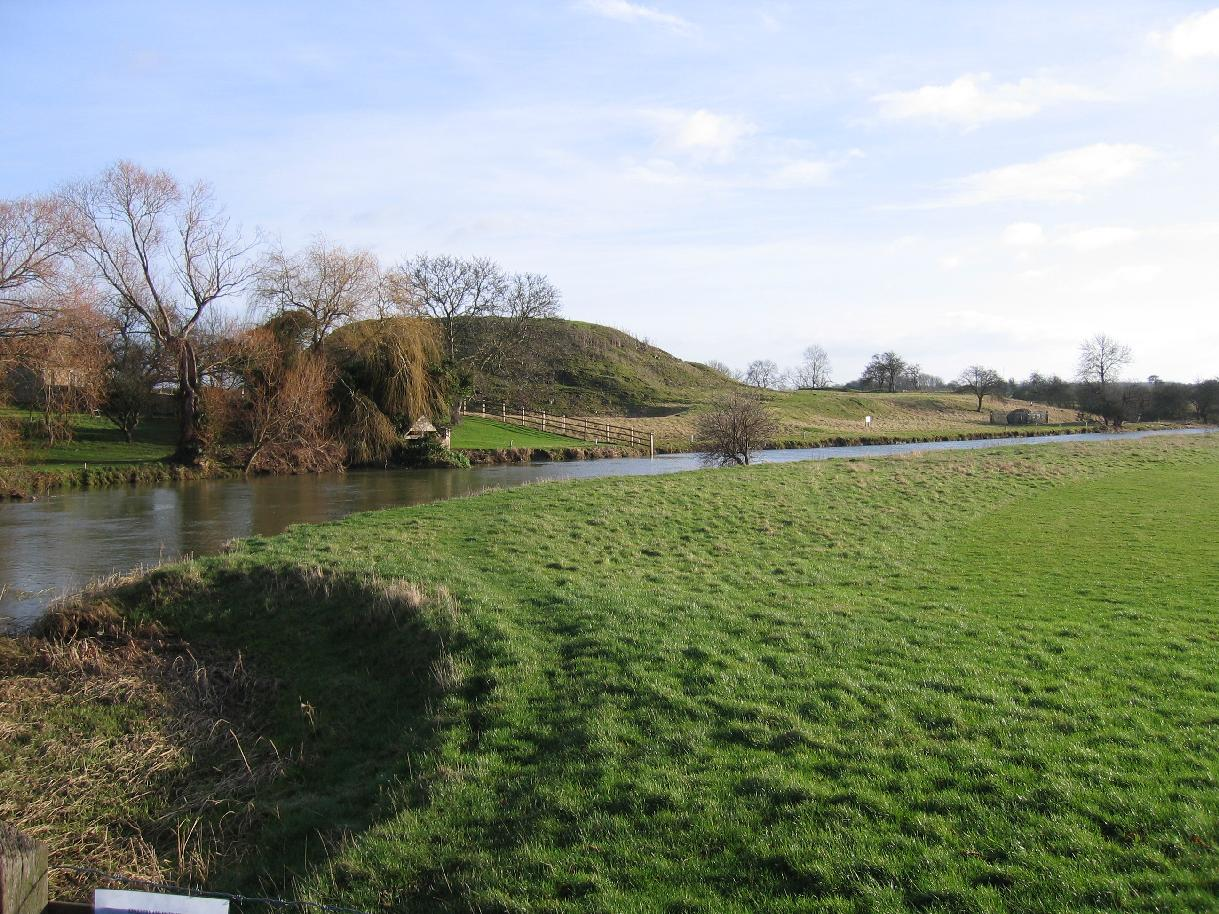
The motte and site of Fotheringhay Castle seen from across the River Nene

William the Conqueror granted the area to Judith of Lens, wife of Waltheof, Earl of Northumbria. Their eldest daughter, Maud, inherited the lordship of Fotheringhay. Around 1090, she married Simon de Senlis who was made Earl of Huntingdon, and about 1100 he founded Fotheringhay Castle, on the northern side of the River Nene. Simon had died by 1113 when King Henry I of England arranged for Maud to marry Prince David of Scotland. Through this marriage, David, who later became King of Scotland, acquired Fotheringhay Castle, as well as other properties in Huntingdonshire. Possession of the castle descended through the Scottish princes until the 13th century.

Shortly after King John was excommunicated, he demanded his barons send him hostages to ensure their loyalty. In 1212, he used this as leverage against David, Earl of Huntingdon and Prince of Scotland, to acquire Fotheringhay Castle. He wrote to the earl, saying "You have given us your son as a hostage, therefore we require you to yield to us your castle at Fotheringhay". This is the first documented reference to the castle. The period 1208 to 1214 saw John confiscate many baronial castles; this proved unpopular with the barons and, to appease them, John began reversing his actions in 1215. Fotheringhay was among the castles he returned to their previous owners that year.

David, Earl of Huntingdon, rebelled against the king, and his property was granted to William Marshal, 2nd Earl of Pembroke. In 1218, Marshal had been ordered to return the earl's estates, but had retained possession of at least Fotheringhay Castle. When David died in June 1219, the Earl of Pembroke still held Fotheringhay despite King Henry III of England's wish for its return. Alexander II, King of Scotland, had a claim to the castle through David and it was to form part of the dowry of Joan, Henry III's sister who was to marry the Scottish king. On 3 December 1219 Marshal finally gave Fotheringhay Castle to the English king.

According to the Barnwell chronicler, Hubert de Burgh, 1st Earl of Kent, was given custody of Fotheringhay Castle in 1221 when he married the King of Scotland's sister. The castle had yet been transferred to the control of the King of Scotland and was still effectively an English castle held under Henry III. William II de Forz, 3rd Earl of Albemarle, rebelled against Henry III late in 1220, and in January the following year captured Fotheringhay Castle, installing his own garrison. He attacked several other castles the same month, but the capture of Fotheringhay was Forz's only success. According to a royal letter he "furtively and seditiously seized the castle of Fotheringhay ... devastating and plundering our land and violently disturbing and infringing our peace and that of our kingdom". Faced with a massing royal army, Forz fled north and Henry III took Fotheringhay and Castle Bytham. Henry III retained control of the castle, and it remained in royal possession until the reign of Edward II.

During the Second Barons' War, Fotheringhay and Chester Castle were taken by Robert de Ferrers, 6th Earl of Derby. He held them from 1264 to 1265. Edward II granted Fotheringhay Castle to John of Brittany, Earl of Richmond. When John died in 1334, his niece Marie de St Pol, the widowed countess of Pembroke, inherited Fotheringhay Castle. She died in 1377, and Edward III gave her property over to his son, Edmund Langley. In 1385, he was made Duke of York by the king and Fotheringhay Castle became his principal seat. According to John Leland writing in 1540, Langley spent a great deal on Fotheringhay Castle. Langley died in 1402 and was succeeded by his eldest son, Edward. He died without children of his own in 1415, so his property passed to his nephew Richard.

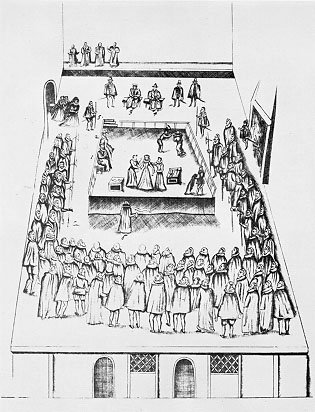
Contemporary sketch of the execution of Mary, Queen of Scots, in Fotheringhay's great hall

Fotheringhay Castle was a favoured residence of Richard, who became Duke of York and a powerful magnate. Married to Cecily Neville of the House of Neville, an influential family in northern England, he fathered two future kings: Edward IV and Richard III, and the latter was born at Fotheringhay Castle in 1452. On 27 March 1454, Richard, Duke of York was named "protector and defender of the realm" while King Henry VI was suffering from mental illness and remained in the position until 9 February 1455. During the subsequent Wars of the Roses between the houses of York and Lancaster the Duke of York was killed at the Battle of Wakefield in 1460. Fotheringhay Castle remained a favoured residence of the family after Richard's death: Cecily often entertained guests there and in 1469 Elizabeth Woodville, Edward IV's queen, resided at the castle. On 11 June 1482, the Scottish prince, Alexander Stewart, Duke of Albany made a treaty at the castle with Edward IV of England to supplant his brother on the throne of Scotland.

Elizabeth of York kept horses at Fotheringhay and her accounts record that a man was paid a shilling to mark her colts in December 1502. Fotheringhay and nearby Collyweston Palace were repaired in 1566 for Elizabeth I. She came to the castle on 22 July 1566.

Mary, Queen of Scots, who had spent much of her 18 years of imprisonment at Sheffield Castle and Sheffield Manor, spent her final days at Fotheringhay, where she was tried and convicted of treason. In this time it was used as a state prison. She attended her own trial in the Great Hall on 5 October 1586, which lasted two days. After waiting over two months for Elizabeth to officially sign her death warrant, Mary was told the sentence would be carried out the day before her execution. She spent her final night praying in the castle's small chapel. She was beheaded on a scaffold in the castle's great hall on 8 February 1587.

== Later period ==
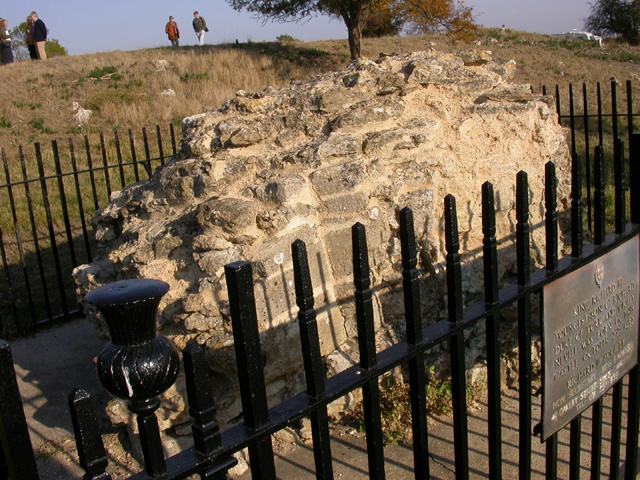
Scant masonry remains of Fotheringhay Castle

Despite the castle's size and importance, it was allowed to fall into disrepair during the latter part of the Elizabethan period. By 1635, less than 50 years after Mary, Queen of Scots' execution, it was reported to be in a ruinous state and was completely demolished soon afterwards.

The castle is a Scheduled Monument, a "nationally important" historic building and archaeological site which has been given protection against unauthorised change. Today there is little to be seen apart from earthworks and some masonry remains. Fotheringhay is open to the public during daylight hours and provides good views along the Nene valley demonstrating well its defensive position.

== Layout ==
Fotheringhay was a large motte-and-bailey castle. A large motte, which was surrounded by a large water-filled moat, was topped with a polygonal stone keep. The inner enclosure, or bailey, was protected by ramparts and a ditch, and its structures included a great hall and other domestic buildings. The outer bailey had curtain walls and a gatehouse; a lake was crossed by way of a bridge. Little is known about the structural history of the castle while Langley was the owner in the 14th century; however, it is thought that he was responsible for building the outer bailey and partially filling the eastern part of the ditch surrounding the motte. The motte is 70 m (230 ft) in diameter at the base and 30 m (100 ft) across the flat top, some 7 m (23 ft) above ground level. The inner bailey is broadly rectangular and measures approximately 50 m × 65 m (164 ft × 213 ft).

== In popular culture ==
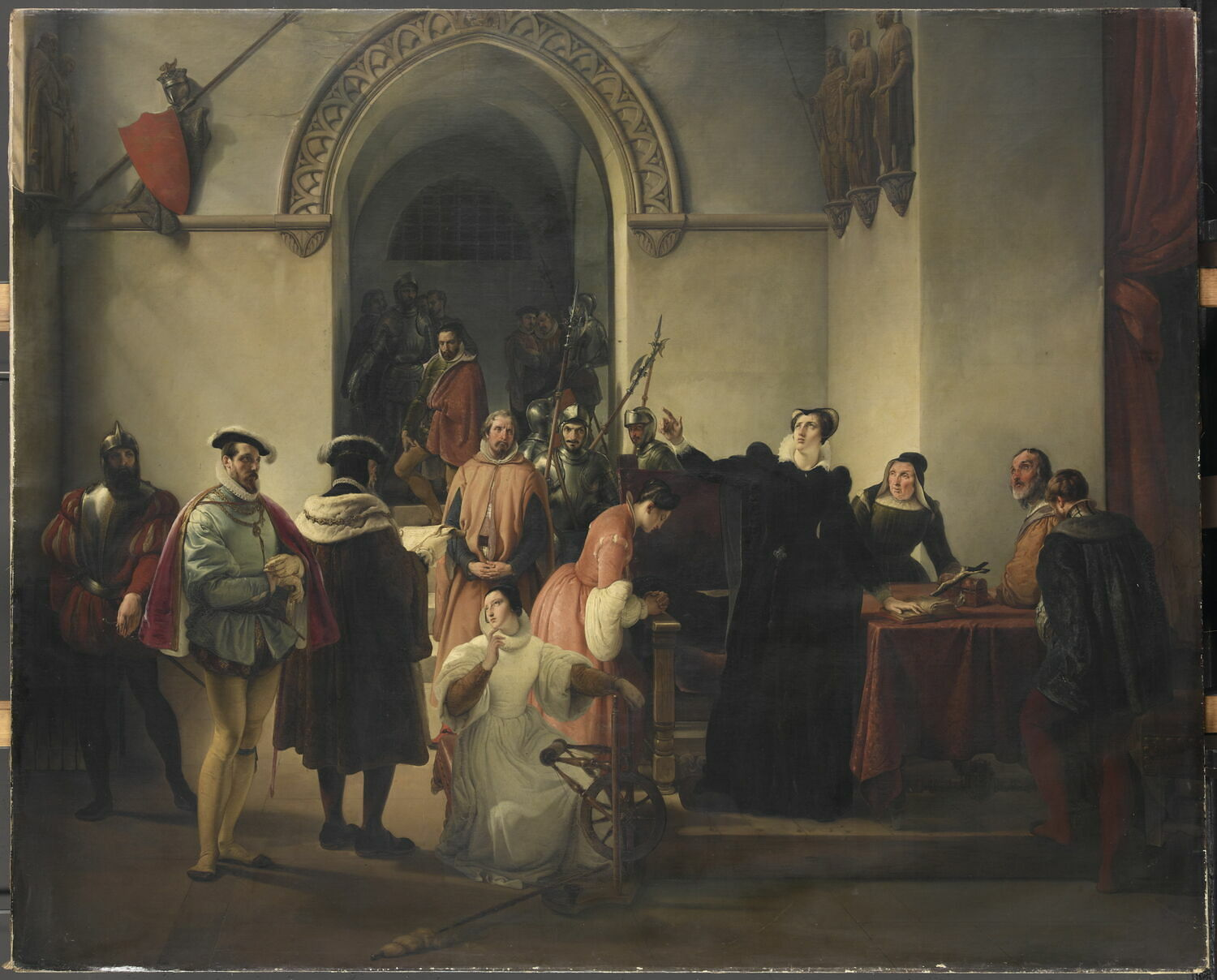
Mary Stuart Proclaiming Her Innocence by Francesco Hayez, 1832. Mary, Queen of Scots is informed of the death sentence at Fotheringhay.

In Gaetano Donizetti's 1835 opera Maria Stuarda, Fotheringhay Castle is the setting of three of the opera's scenes.

"Fotheringay" was the title of a song written about the imprisonment of Mary, Queen of Scots, by Sandy Denny. It appeared in 1969 on What We Did on Our Holidays, her first album with the British folk rock band Fairport Convention. Denny's band after leaving Fairport Convention was named Fotheringay. That band released one self-titled album in 1970 before disbanding, with a second album being stitched together by surviving members from old and new recordings in 2008.

== See also ==
- Church of St Mary and All Saints, Fotheringhay
- Castles in Great Britain and Ireland
- List of castles in England
