= St Andrew's Priory, Northampton =

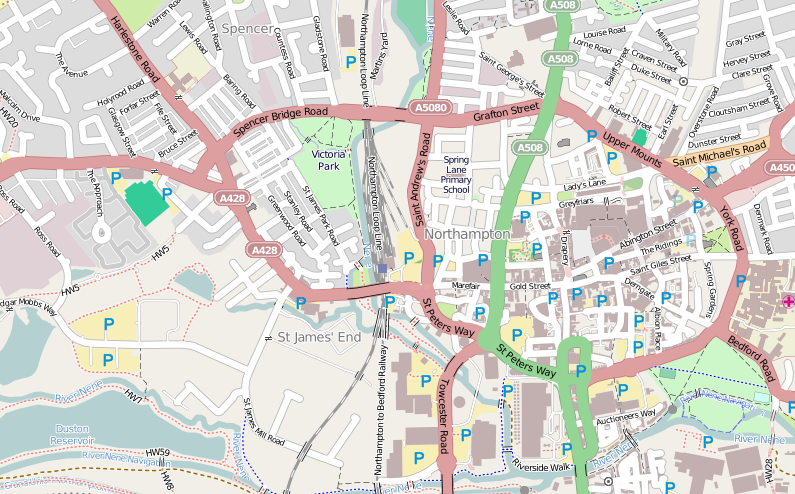
Location in Northampton of St Andrew's Priory

St Andrew's Priory was a Cluniac house in Northampton, England.

The priory was founded between 1093 and 1100 by Simon de Senlis, Earl of Northampton and his wife Maud. A sister house for Cluniac nuns, Delapré Abbey, was founded to the south of the town by their son Simon II de Senlis, Earl of Huntingdon-Northampton. St Andrew's was initially an alien house, dependent on the French La Charité, but it was independent from 1405.

It was located in the north-west corner of the walled town of Northampton and was surrounded by a precinct wall. Maps of 1610 and 1632 suggest that the church lay to the north of Lower Priory Street and the gatehouse north of Grafton Street.

The Scottish Franciscan philosopher and theologian John Duns (commonly known as Duns Scotus) was ordained into the priesthood at St Andrew's on 17 March 1291.

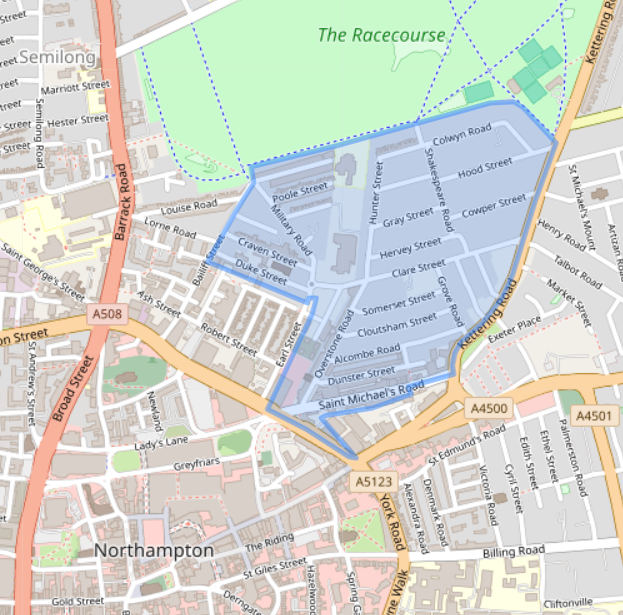
Parish boundaries of the parish of Northampton St Andrew's Priory from 1858 until its abolition in 1909 (before 1858 it was extra-parochial)

The priory was surrendered on 2 March 1538 to Richard Layton; he reported that the house was greatly in debt and the walls ruinous. The last prior, Francis Abree (alias Francis Leycester) became the first dean of the newly established diocese of Peterborough.

The site of the priory was built over in the 19th century. The Roman Catholic Northampton Cathedral was erected on land bought in 1823; the first Catholic chapel of St Andrews was built using stone found on the site.

== Burials ==
- Simon II de Senlis, Earl of Huntingdon-Northampton
- Simon III de Senlis
- Lochlann of Galloway
- Ralph Ogle, 3rd Baron Ogle

== See also ==
- Cluniac priories in Britain
