= Simeon II (disambiguation) =

Simeon II (born 1937; r. 1943–1946) was Tsar of Bulgaria and Prime Minister of Bulgaria.

Simeon II may also refer to:

- Simon II (High Priest), High Priest of Israel during the Second Temple period
- Pope Simeon II of Alexandria (d. 830)
- Simeon II (fl. 902–923), Caucasian Albanian catholicos
- Simeon II of Jerusalem, Greek Orthodox patriarch of Jerusalem in the 11th century
- Simeon II Olelkovich (died 1503), prince of Kopyl and Slutsk
- Shemʿon II, patriarch of the Church of the East from c. 1385 until c. 1405

== See also ==
- Simeon I (disambiguation)
- Simeon III (disambiguation)
- Simeon of Bulgaria (disambiguation)
- Simon II (disambiguation)
