= Simon I =

Simon I may refer to:

- Simon I (High Priest) (310–291 or 300–270 BCE)
- Simon I of Montfort (1025–1087)
- Simon I de Senlis, Earl of Huntingdon-Northampton (died c. 1111)
- Simon I, Duke of Lorraine (1076–1138)
- Simon I, Count of Saarbrücken (died >1183)
- Simon I, Count of Tecklenburg (c. 1140–1202)
- Simon I, Count of Sponheim-Kreuznach (1210/15–1264)
- Simon I of Isenburg-Kempenich, Lord of Isenburg-Kempenich from 1329 until 1341
- Simon I, Lord of Lippe (c. 1261–1344)
- Simon I of Kartli (1537–1611)
- Simon I Gurieli

== See also ==
- Simeon I (disambiguation)
