= Matilda, Countess of Huntingdon =

Matilda, Countess of Huntingdon may refer to:

- Maud of Northumbria, Countess of Huntingdon (1074–1130), the wife of King David I of Scotland; often referred to as Matilda
- Matilda of Chester, Countess of Huntingdon (1171-1233), the wife of Prince David of Scotland; sometimes referred to as Maud and sometimes known with the surname de Kevelioc

== See also ==
- Earl of Huntingdon
