= Earl of Huntingdon =

Title in the Peerage of England

- Arms of Hastings: Argent, a maunch sable
- Creation date: 1065 (first creation); 1529 (current creation)
- Created by: Edward the Confessor (first creation); Henry VIII (current creation)
- Peerage: Peerage of England
- First holder: Waltheof, Earl of Northumbria
- Present holder: William Hastings-Bass, 17th Earl of Huntingdon
- Heir presumptive: The Hon. John Peter Robin Hood Hastings-Bass
- Remainder to: heirs male of the body (lawfully begotten)
- Subsidiary titles: None, invented courtesy title "Viscount Hastings" used by heir apparent
- Seats: Hodcott House, Berks; Sharavogue, King's Co.
- Motto: In veritae victoria ("Victory is in truth")

Earl of Huntingdon is a title which has been created several times in the Peerage of England. The medieval title (1065 creation) was associated with the ruling house of Scotland (David of Scotland).

The seventh and most recent creation dates to 1529. In this lineage, the current holder of the title is William Hastings-Bass, 17th Earl of Huntingdon (b. 1948).

In English folklore from 16th century onwards, the title has been associated with Robin Hood, whose true name is often given as "Robert of Huntingdon". In older stories about Robin Hood, he is merely a yeoman from the town of Locksley or Loxley.

== Early history ==
Huntingdonshire was part of the Kingdom of East Anglia, inhabited by a group known as the Gyrwas from about the 6th century. It fell to the Danes in the 9th century, but was re-conquered under Edward the Elder in 915. An earldom of Huntingdon was established shortly after, and it was one of the seven earldoms of Saxon England during the reign of king Edward the Confessor.

It was created for Beorn Estrithson, cousin to Harold Godwinson (later King Harold). The earldom at that time carried extensive powers and covered a wide area of the East Midlands, covering the counties of Northamptonshire and Bedfordshire as well as Huntingdonshire.

== First creation (1065) ==
In 1065 the earldom passed to Waltheof, son of Siward, Earl of Northumbria. Waltheof kept his title following the Conquest in 1066, and even after his rebellion in 1067, and married Judith, King William's niece. However, after the second rebellion in 1076, he was executed and the earldom was reduced in size and power.

The earldom was inherited by Waltheof's daughter Maud, countess of Huntingdon, and passed to her husbands in turn, first Simon de Senlis and then David King of Scotland.

Following her death, and during the reigns of Matilda and Stephen and the anarchy that ensued, the earldom was the subject of dispute between Maud's sons Simon II and Henry of Scotland, and was held by both at various times. In the reign of Henry II, following the death of Simon II, it was settled on the Scottish house, and the sons of Prince Henry: first Malcolm, then William, then David. With the death of David's childless son John in 1237, the title was not passed on and became extinct.

- Waltheof (d. 1076)
- Judith of Lens, Countess of Huntingdon (c. 1055 – after 1086)
- Maud, Countess of Huntingdon (c. 1074–1130/31)
  - m. Simon I de Senlis, Earl of Huntingdon-Northampton (died c. 1111)
  - m. David I of Scotland (c. 1084–1153)
- Henry, Earl of Northumbria (1114–1152)
- Simon II de Senlis, Earl of Huntingdon-Northampton (4th Earl) (c. 1098–1153)
- Malcolm IV of Scotland (1141–1165)
- William I of Scotland (c. 1142–1214)
- Simon III de Senlis (succeeded in 1174, upon the forfeiture by William who had succeeded as king of Scotland.)
- David of Scotland, Earl of Huntingdon (8th Earl) (1152–1219)
- John of Scotland, Earl of Huntingdon (9th Earl) (1207–1237)

== Second creation (1337) ==
- William de Clinton, Earl of Huntingdon (1304–1354)

== Third creation (1377) ==
- Guichard d'Angle, Earl of Huntingdon (d. 1380) (Life Peerage)

== Fourth creation (1388) ==
- John Holland, 1st Duke of Exeter, 1st Earl of Huntingdon (c. 1352–1400) (forfeit 1400)
- John Holland, 2nd Duke of Exeter, 2nd Earl of Huntingdon (1395–1447) (restored 1416)
- Henry Holland, 3rd Duke of Exeter, 3rd Earl of Huntingdon (1430–1475) (forfeit 1461)

== Fifth creation (1471) ==
- see Marquess of Dorset, third creation (1475)

== Sixth creation (1479) ==
- William Herbert (1451–1491) (created Earl in compensation for surrendering the Earldom of Pembroke to Edward IV).

== Seventh creation (1529) ==
Arms of the Hastings family, Earls of Huntingdon as recorded in the Gelre Armorial: Argent, a maunch sable

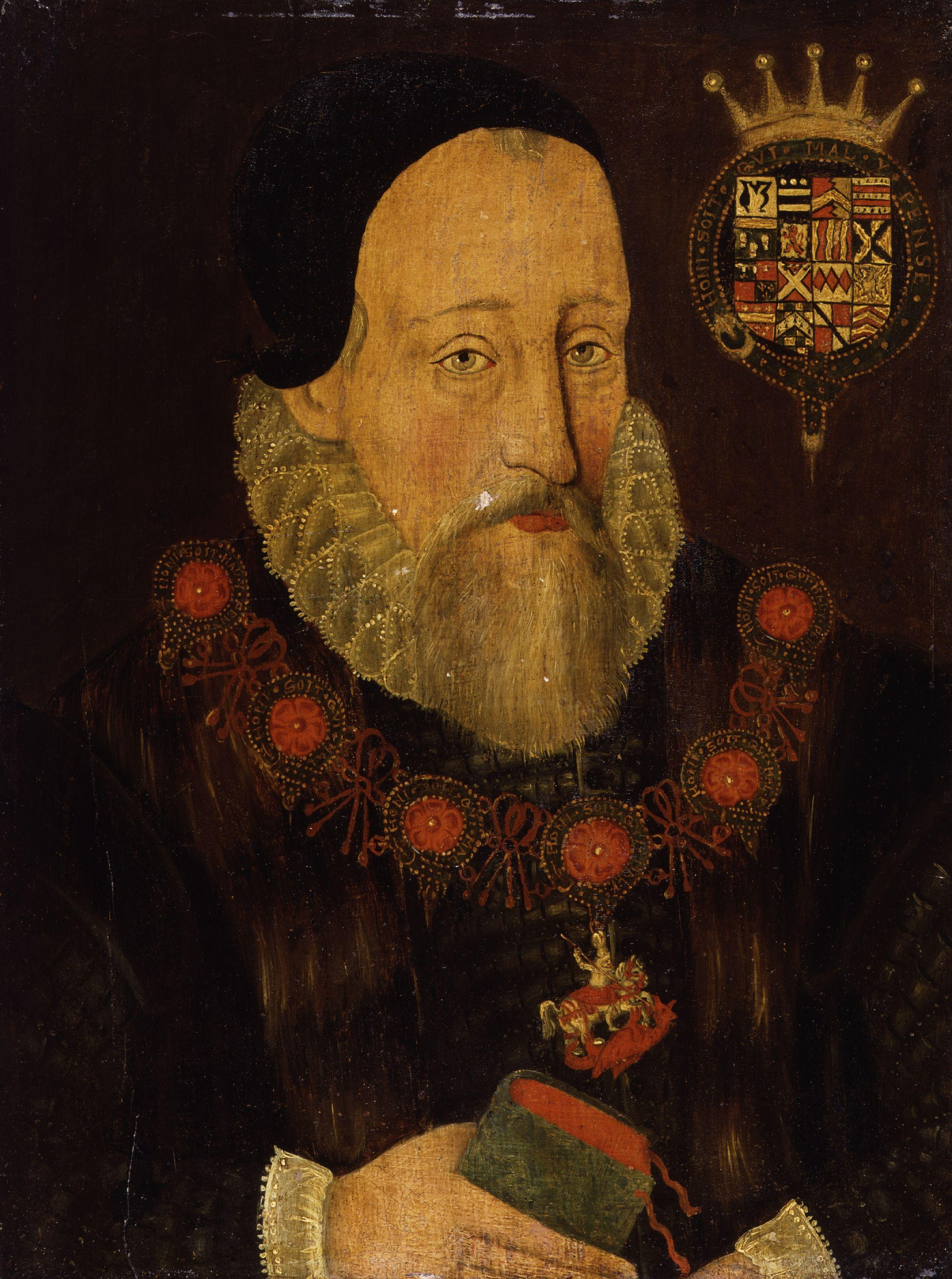
Henry Hastings, 3rd Earl of Huntingdon

The title was re-created for George Hastings, 3rd Baron Hastings, 5th Baron Hungerford, 6th Baron Botreaux and 3rd Baron de Moleyns. He fought in the French Wars of Henry VIII, and was part of the royalist suppression of the rebellion known as the Pilgrimage of Grace. In 1529 the King created him Earl of Huntingdon in the Peerage of England. His eldest son, the second Earl, was a lieutenant-general and served as Commander-in-Chief of the Army. Lord Huntingdon married Catherine, daughter and co-heiress of Henry Pole, 1st Baron Montagu, son of Sir Richard Pole and Margaret Pole, 8th Countess of Salisbury, daughter and sole heiress of George, Duke of Clarence, brother of King Edward IV. On his death the titles passed to his son, the third Earl. He was a possible heir presumptive to the crown through his mother, though Elizabeth I never acknowledged his claim officially. Lord Huntingdon was one of the custodians of Mary, Queen of Scots, and also served as President of the Council of the North. He was succeeded by his younger brother, the fourth Earl. He represented Derbyshire and Leicestershire in the House of Commons and served as Lord-Lieutenant of Rutland and Leicestershire.

When he died the titles passed to his grandson, the fifth Earl. He was the son of Francis Hastings, Lord Hastings (d. 1595). Lord Huntingdon was also Lord-Lieutenant of Leicestershire and Rutland. He was succeeded by his eldest son, the sixth Earl. He sat as Member of Parliament for Leicestershire. His son, the seventh Earl, and also served as Lord-Lieutenant of Leicestershire and Derbyshire. He was succeeded by his eldest son, the eighth Earl. He carried the Sceptre at the Coronation of Queen Anne but died at an early age. He was succeeded by his half-brother, the ninth Earl. He carried the Sword of State at the Coronation of King George II. His son, the tenth Earl, was a courtier and notably served as Master of the Horse. He had no legitimate male issue and on his death in 1789 the earldom became dormant. He was succeeded in the baronies of Hastings, Hungerford, de Moleyns and Botreaux by his sister Lady Elizabeth, wife of The 1st Earl of Moira.

The earldom was assumed by the tenth Earl's distant relative (his fifth cousin once removed) Reverend Theophilus Henry Hastings. He was the great-great-great-grandson of Sir Edward Hastings (d. 1603), younger son of the second Earl. He is by some sources considered as the de jure eleventh Earl while some sources do not include him in the numbering of the Earls. On his death, the claim passed to his nephew Hans Francis Hastings, son of George Hastings. He was allowed to take his seat in the House of Lords as the Earl of Huntingdon in 1819. Depending on the sources he is numbered as the eleventh or twelfth Earl. Lord Huntingdon served as Governor of Jamaica from 1822 to 1824.

Hans' great-great-grandson, the sixteenth (or fifteenth Earl), was an artist, academic and Labour politician. He died without male issue in 1990 and was succeeded by his first cousin once removed, the seventeenth (or sixteenth) and (as of 2017) present holder of the title. He is the uncle of television presenter Clare Balding and eldest son of Captain Peter Robin Hood Hastings Bass (1920–1964) (who assumed the additional surname of Bass, which was that of his uncle by marriage, Sir William Bass, 2nd Baronet, by deed poll in 1954), son of Aubrey Craven Theophilus Robin Hood Hastings (1878–1929), younger son of the fourteenth Earl.

Several other members of the Hastings family may be mentioned. The Hon. Edward Hastings, third son of the first Earl, was created Baron Hastings of Loughborough in 1558. Richard Hastings, a grandson of Sir Edward Hastings, younger son of the second Earl, was created a baronet in 1667 (see Hastings baronets). The Hon. Henry Hastings, second son of the fifth Earl, was created Baron Loughborough in 1643. Lucy Hastings, Countess of Huntingdon, wife of the sixth Earl, was a poet. Selina Hastings, Countess of Huntingdon, wife of the ninth Earl, was a Methodist leader and the founder of the Countess of Huntingdon's Connexion. Charles Hastings, illegitimate son of the tenth Earl, was a distinguished soldier and was created a baronet in 1806 (see Abney-Hastings baronets). The Hon. George Fowler Hastings, second son of the twelfth (or eleventh) Earl, was a vice-admiral in the Royal Navy. Alexander Plantagenet Hastings (1843–1928), son of Captain the Hon. Edward Plantagenet Robin Hood Hastings (1818–1857), third son of the twelfth (or eleventh) Earl, was an admiral in the Royal Navy. His son Edward George Godolphin Hastings (1887–1973) was a captain in the Royal Navy.

The Earl possesses no subsidiary titles, but his eldest son uses the invented courtesy title of Viscount Hastings to avoid confusion, there already being a Baron Hastings.

The family seat of the present line is at Hodcott House, near West Ilsley, in Berkshire.

- George Hastings, 1st Earl of Huntingdon (1488–1544)
- Francis Hastings, 2nd Earl of Huntingdon (1514–1560)
- Henry Hastings, 3rd Earl of Huntingdon (1536–1595)
- George Hastings, 4th Earl of Huntingdon (1540–1604)
- Henry Hastings, 5th Earl of Huntingdon (1586–1643)
- Ferdinando Hastings, 6th Earl of Huntingdon (1609–1656)
- Theophilus Hastings, 7th Earl of Huntingdon (1650–1701)
- George Hastings, 8th Earl of Huntingdon (1677–1705)
- Theophilus Hastings, 9th Earl of Huntingdon (1696–1746)
- Francis Hastings, 10th Earl of Huntingdon (1729–1789) (dormant)
- Theophilus Henry Hastings, de jure 11th Earl of Huntingdon (1728–1804)
- Hans Francis Hastings, 12th Earl of Huntingdon (1779–1828) (confirmed in title 1819)
- Francis Theophilus Henry Hastings, 13th Earl of Huntingdon (1808–1875)
- Francis Power Plantagenet Hastings, 14th Earl of Huntingdon (1841–1885)
- Warner Francis John Plantagenet Hastings, 15th Earl of Huntingdon (1868–1939)
- Francis John Clarence Westenra Plantagenet Hastings, 16th Earl of Huntingdon (1901–1990)
- William Edward Robin Hood Hastings-Bass, 17th Earl of Huntingdon (b. 1948)

The heir presumptive is the present holder's brother the Hon. John Peter Robin Hood Hastings-Bass (b. 1954).
The heir presumptive's heir is his cousin Adam Francis Hastings (b. 1977), a great-great-great-grandson of the 12th Earl.

=== Line of succession ===
Line of succession
- Hans Hastings, 12th Earl of Huntingdon (1779–1828)
  - Francis Hastings, 13th Earl of Huntingdon (1808–1875)
    - Francis Hastings, 14th Earl of Huntingdon (1841–1885)
      - Warner Hastings, 15th Earl of Huntingdon (1868–1939)
        - Francis Hastings, 16th Earl of Huntingdon (1901–1990)
      - Hon. Aubrey Craven Theophilus Robin Hood Hastings (1878–1929)
        - Peter Robin Hood Hastings-Bass (1920–1964)
          - William Hastings-Bass, 17th Earl of Huntingdon (b. 1948)
          - (1). Hon. John Peter Robin Hood Hastings-Bass (b. 1954)
  - Hon. George Fowler Hastings (1814–1876)
    - Hans Francis Hastings (1865–1933)
      - George Godolphin Hastings (1905–1981)
        - Warren Francis Hastings (1938–2005)
          - (2). Adam Francis Hastings (b. 1977)
  - Rev. Hon. Richard Godolphin Henry Hastings (1820–1865)
    - Henry John Churchill Hastings (1856–1924)
      - Henry Theophilus James Hastings (1910–1977)
        - David Walter Theophilus Hastings (1947–2022)
          - (3). Ian David Hastings (b. 1975)

=== Family tree of the earls of Huntingdon (seventh creation) ===
Dukes of Exeter, Marquesses of Northampton, Earls of Huntingdon, and Earls of Wilmington family tree

Robert; 1000–1035; Duke of Normandy
Adelaide of Normandy c. 1030–before 1090; Countess of Aumale	William the Conqueror c. 1028–1087; King of England
Earl of Huntingdon (1st creation), 1065; Earl of Northampton (1st creation), 1071
Waltheof d. 1076; Earl of Northumbria, 1st Earl of Huntingdon, 1st Earl of Northampton	Judith of Lens; 1054/1055–c. 1090
David I c. 1084–1153; King of Alba	Maud c. 1074–1130; 2nd Countess of Huntingdon, 2nd Countess of Northampton, Queen of Scotland	Simon I de Senlis d. 1111–1113; 2nd Earl of Huntingdon, 2nd Earl of Northampton jure uxoris
Henry of Scotland; 1114–1152; 3rd Earl of Huntingdon, Earl of Northumbria	Simon II de Senlis c. 1098–1153; 4th Earl of Huntingdon, 3rd Earl of Northampton
Malcolm IV; 1141–1165; King of Alba, 5th Earl of Huntingdon	William I (the Lion) c. 1142–1214; King of Alba, 6th Earl of Huntingdon	David; 1152–1219; 8th Earl of Huntingdon, Earl of Northumbria	Simon III de Senlis c. 1138–1184; 7th Earl of Huntingdon, 4th Earl of Northampton
Earldom of Northampton (1st creation) reverted to the Crown, 1184
John of Scotland; 1207–1237; 9th Earl of Huntingdon, Earl of Chester
Earldom of Huntingdon (1st creation) extinct, 1237 and later reverted to the Crown
Earl of Huntingdon (2nd creation), 1337
William de Clinton c. 1304–1354; Earl of Huntingdon, Baron Clinton
Earl of Northampton (2nd creation), 1337	Earldom of Huntingdon (2nd creation) extinct, 1354	Earl of Huntingdon (3rd creation for life), 1377
William de Bohun c. 1312 – 1373; Earl of Hereford, Earl of Essex, 1st Earl of Northampton	Edward III; 1312–1377; King of England	Guichard (IV) d'Angle c. 1305/1315–1380; Earl of Huntingdon
Earldom of Huntingdon (3rd creation) extinct, 1380
Humphrey de Bohun; 1342–1373; Earl of Hereford, Earl of Essex, 2nd Earl of Northampton	Joan of Kent c. 1328–1385	Edward of Woodstock "The Black Prince; 1330–1376	John of Gaunt; 1340–1399; Duke of Lancaster	Thomas of Woodstock; 1355–1397; Duke of Gloucester
Earldom of Northampton (2nd creation) abeyant, 1373
Earl of Huntingdon (4th creation), 1388; Duke of Exeter (1st creation), 1397	Earl of Northampton (2nd creation restored), 1384	Duke of Exeter (2nd creation), 1416	Earl of Northampton (3rd creation), 1399
John Holland c. 1352–1400; 1st Duke of Exeter, 1st Earl of Huntingdon	Richard II; 1367–c. 1400; King of England	Henry Bolingbroke c. 1367 – 1413; 3rd Earl of Northampton, later King Henry IV	Thomas Beaufort c. 1377–1426; Duke of Exeter; Earl of Dorset	Anne of Gloucester; 1383–1438; Countess of Northampton
Dukedom of Exeter (1st creation) and Earldom of Huntingdon (4th creation) forfeit, 1400	Earldom of Northampton (2nd creation) merged in the crown, 1399	Dukedom of Exeter (2nd creation) extinct, 1426	Earldom of Northampton (3rd creation) extinct, 1438
Earldom of Huntingdon (4th creation) restored, 1416; Duke of Exeter (1st creation restored or 3rd creation), 1444
John Holland; 1395–1447; 2nd Duke of Exeter, 2nd Earl of Huntingdon
Henry Holland; 1430–1475; 3rd Duke of Exeter, 3rd Earl of Huntingdon	Edward IV; 1421–1471; King of England	Elizabeth Woodville c. 1437–1492
Dukedom of Exeter (1st/3rd creation) and Earldom of Huntingdon (4th creation) forfeit, 1461
Earl of Huntingdon (5th creation), 1471	Earl of Huntingdon (6th creation), 1479
Thomas Grey; 1455–1501; Earl of Huntingdon, Marquess of Dorset	Mary Woodville c. 1456–1481	William Herbert; 1451–1491; Earl of Huntingdon, Earl of Pembroke
Earldom of Huntingdon (5th creation) surrendered, 1475	Earldom of Huntingdon (6th creation) extinct, 1491
Earl of Huntingdon (7th creation), 1529
Thomas Parr; 1478–1517	George Hastings; 1488–1544; 1st Earl of Huntingdon
Baron Parr of Kendall, 1539; Marquess of Northampton (1st creation), Baron Hart, 1543	Baron Hastings of Loughborough, 1558
Henry VIII; 1491–1547; King of England	Catherine Parr; 1512–1548	William Parr; 1513–1571; Marquess of Northampton, Earl of Essex, 1st Baron Parr, 1st Baron Hart	Francis Hastings; 1514–1561; 2nd Earl of Huntingdon	Edward Hastings c. 1521–1572; Baron Hastings of Loughborough
Marquessate of Northampton (1st creation), Earldom of Essex (7th creation) forfeit, 1554; restored, 1559; extinct, 1571	Barony Hastings of Loughborough extinct, 1572
Earl of Northampton, (4th creation), 1604	Baron Compton, 1572
Henry Howard; 1540–1614; Earl of Northampton	Henry Compton; 1544–1589; 1st Baron Compton	Frances Anne Hastings; 1533–1574	Henry Hastings; 1536–1595; 3rd Earl of Huntingdon	George Hastings; 1540–1604; 4th Earl of Huntingdon	Edward Hastings; 1541–1603
Earldom of Northampton (4th creation) extinct, 1614
Earl of Northampton (5th creation), 1618
William Compton d. 1630; 1st Earl of Northampton, 2nd Baron Compton	Francis Hastings; 1560–1595	Henry c. 1555–1640
Henry Hastings; 1586–1643; 5th Earl of Huntingdon
Spencer Compton; 1601–1643; 2nd Earl of Northampton, 3rd Baron Compton	Ferdinando Hastings; 1609–1656; 6th Earl of Huntingdon	Henry b. 1605
James Compton; 1622–1681; 3rd Earl of Northampton, 4th Baron Compton	Theophilus Hastings; 1650–1701; 7th Earl of Huntingdon	Richard; 1645–1714
Baron Wilmington, 1728; Earl of Wilmington and Viscount Pevensey, 1730
George Compton; 1664–1727; 4th Earl of Northampton, 5th Baron Compton	Spencer Compton c. 1674 – 1743; Earl of Wilmington, Viscount Pevensey, Baron Wilmington	George Hastings; 1677–1705; 8th Earl of Huntingdon
Earldom of Wilmington, Vicountcy Pevensey, and Barony Wilmington extinct, 1743
James Compton; 1687–1754; 5th Earl of Northampton, 6th Baron Compton	George Compton; 1692–1758; 6th Earl of Northampton	Charles Compton	Theophilus Hastings c. 1696–1746; 9th Earl of Huntingdon	Henry; 1701–1786
Charlotte Townshend d. 1770; Viscountess Townshend, Baroness Ferrers of Chartley, 7th Baroness Compton	Charles Compton; 1737–1763; 7th Earl of Northampton	Francis Hastings; 1729–1789; 10th Earl of Huntingdon	Theophilus Hastings; 1728–1804; 11th Earl of Huntingdon de jure	George; 1735–1802
Earldom of Huntingdon dormant/abeyant, 1804
George Townshend; 1753–1811; Marquess Townshend, Earl of Leicester, Viscount Townshend, Baron Townshend, Baron Ferrers of Chartley, 8th Baron Compton	Spencer Compton; 1760–1828; 8th Earl of Northampton
Marquess of Northampton (2nd creation), Earl Compton and Baron Wilmington, 1812	Earldom of Huntingdon claim restored, 1819
George Townshend (1778–1885); Marquess Townshend, Earl of Leicester, Viscount Townshend, Baron Townshend, Baron Ferrers of Chartley, 9th Baron Compton	Charles Compton; 1760–1828; 1st Marquess of Northampton, etc., 9th Earl of Northampton	Hans "Francis" Hastings; 1779–1828; 12th Earl of Huntingdon
Barony Compton abeyant, 1855
Spencer Joshua Alwyne Compton; 1790–1851; 2nd Marquess of Northampton, etc., 10th Earl of Northampton
Charles Douglas-Compton; 1816–1877; 3rd Marquess of Northampton, etc., 11th Earl of Northampton	William Compton; 1818–1897; 4th Marquess of Northampton, etc., 12th Earl of Northampton	Francis Theophilus Henry Hastings; 1808–1875; 13th Earl of Huntingdon	George; 1814–1876
Francis Power Plantagenet Hastings; 1841–1885; 14th Earl of Huntingdon
William George Spencer Scott Compton; 1851–1913; 5th Marquess of Northampton, etc., 13th Earl of Northampton	Warner Francis John Plantagenet Hastings; 1868–1939; 15th Earl of Huntingdon	Aubrey; 1878–1929	Hans; 1865–1933
William Bingham Compton; 1885–1978; 6th Marquess of Northampton, etc., 14th Earl of Northampton	Francis John Clarence Westenra Plantagenet Hastings; 1901–1990; 16th Earl of Huntingdon	Peter Hastings-Bass; 1920–1964	George; 1905–1981
Spencer Douglas David Compton b. 1946; 7th Marquess of Northampton, etc., 15th Earl of Northampton	William Edward Robin Hood Hastings-Bass b. 1948; 17th Earl of Huntingdon	John Hastings-Bass b. 1954	George; 1938–2005
Heir presumptive to the Earldom of Huntingdon
Daniel Bingham Compton b. 1973 styled Earl Compton	Adam b. 1977
Heir apparent to the Marquessate of Northampton	Second Heir presumptive to the Earldom of Huntingdon

== See also ==
- Baron Hastings
- Baron Hungerford
- Baron Botreaux
- Baron de Moleyns
- Hastings baronets
- Abney-Hastings baronets
- Britain's Real Monarch – argues that 3rd–10th Earls should have been the monarchs of England
- Countess of Huntingdon
  - Maud, Countess of Huntingdon
  - Selina Hastings, Countess of Huntingdon

== Arms ==
Coat of arms of the Earl of Huntingdon
Crest A Bull's Head erased Sable armed and ducally gorged Or. Escutcheon Argent a Maunch Sable. Supporters On either side a Man Tiger (or Lion guardant with Human Face) Or the Faces proper. Motto In Veritate Victoria (Victory is in Truth).

== Popular culture ==
In English folklore, the title has been associated with Robin Hood, whose true name is often given as "Robert of Huntingdon", though alternatively Robin is said to be from Locksley or Loxley. It was used in the 1980s ITV TV series Robin of Sherwood starring Jason Connery as Robert, who succeeds Robin of Loxley (Michael Praed) in the role of Robin Hood.
