= Simon II =

Simon II may refer to:

- Simon II (High Priest) (219–199 BCE)
- Simon II de Montfort (c. 1068–1104)
- Simon II de Senlis, Earl of Huntingdon-Northampton (c. 1098–1153)
- Simon II, Duke of Lorraine (1140–1207)
- Simon II of Clermont (c. 1210 – 1285/86), Seigneur (Lord) of Ailly, Maulette and Nesle (in Picardy)
- Simon II of Clermont-Nesle (born after 1250–1312/13), French bishop of Noyon (1297–1301) and Bishop-count of Beauvais (1301–c. 1312)
- Simon II, Count of Sponheim-Kreuznach (c. 1270 – 1336)
- Simon II, Lord of Lippe (died 1344)
- Simon II of Isenburg-Kempenich, ruled 1341–1367
- Simon II of Kartli (c. 1608–1631)
- Simon II Gurieli (1606–c. 1672), Georgian Prince of Guria 1625
- Simeon II, Tsar of Bulgaria

== See also ==
- Simeon II (disambiguation)
