= Sawtry Abbey =

Coordinates: 52°25′39″N 0°14′22″W

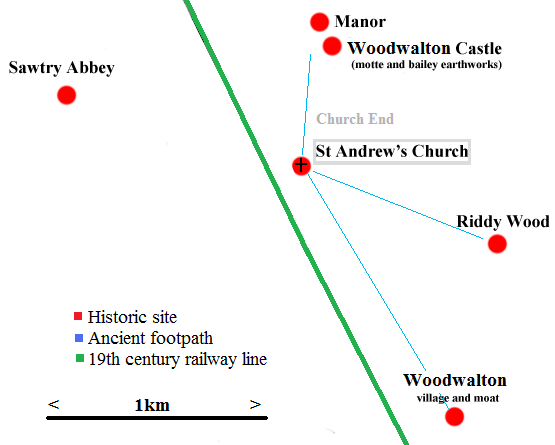
Sawtry Abbey in respect to the East Coast Main Line and the parish of Woodwalton.

Sawtry Abbey was a Cistercian abbey located between Sawtry and Woodwalton in Cambridgeshire, England. The abbey was founded in 1147 by Simon II de Senlis, Earl of Northampton, who was the grandson of Earl Waltheof and Judith, the niece of William the Conqueror who held the manor when the Domesday Survey was compiled. It is the only Cistercian abbey in the county.

A colony of monks from Wardon Abbey in Bedfordshire joined the new monastery, which was founded as an independent abbey. Due to its proximity to other monasteries, disputes over tithes and land with the abbots of Ramsey and Thorney often occurred during the 13th century.

During the 14th century, the abbot of Sawtry was often recorded as being in debt, although the exact cause is unknown. Indeed, very few documents relating to the abbey survive. The abbey was worth less than £200 a year, and at the Dissolution of the Monasteries the whole establishment was disbanded before December 1536. Of the 12 monks and 22 conversi only the abbot, William Angell, received a pension of £10.

Following the dissolution in 1536, the church, conventual buildings, gate-house, bell tower and even the old parish church of Sawtry Judith were demolished. Stone was removed from the site as late as the 19th century.

Excavations took place between 1907 and 1913. The layout of most of the abbey was recovered. The church was cruciform with short transepts and choir. The cloisters were located to the south and to their East was an infirmary or Abbots lodging. A guest house was situated south-west of the cloister. The earthworks were resurveyed and are well preserved. The site has been scheduled since 1954.

== Burials ==
- Isobel of Huntingdon
- David, Earl of Huntingdon
- Matilda of Chester, Countess of Huntingdon
- Beatrice de Teyden
- Margaret of Huntingdon, Duchess of Brittany
- Lady Margaret Fraser Keith, d. 1410
