= Sawtry =

Village in Cambridgeshire, England

Coordinates: 52.44°N 0.28°W

- Location within Cambridgeshire
- Population: 6,536 (2011)
- OS grid reference: TL168836
- Civil parish: Sawtry
- District: Huntingdonshire
- Shire county: Cambridgeshire
- Region: East
- Country: England
- Sovereign state: United Kingdom
- Post town: Huntingdon
- Postcode district: PE28
- Dialling code: 01487
- Police: Cambridgeshire
- Fire: Cambridgeshire
- Ambulance: East of England
- UK Parliament: Huntingdon

Sawtry (/sɔːtriː/) is a village and civil parish in Cambridgeshire, England. Sawtry lies approximately 8 miles (13 km) north of Huntingdon. Sawtry is situated within Huntingdonshire which is a non-metropolitan district of Cambridgeshire as well as being a historic county of England. The village is home to over 6,000 people.

== History ==
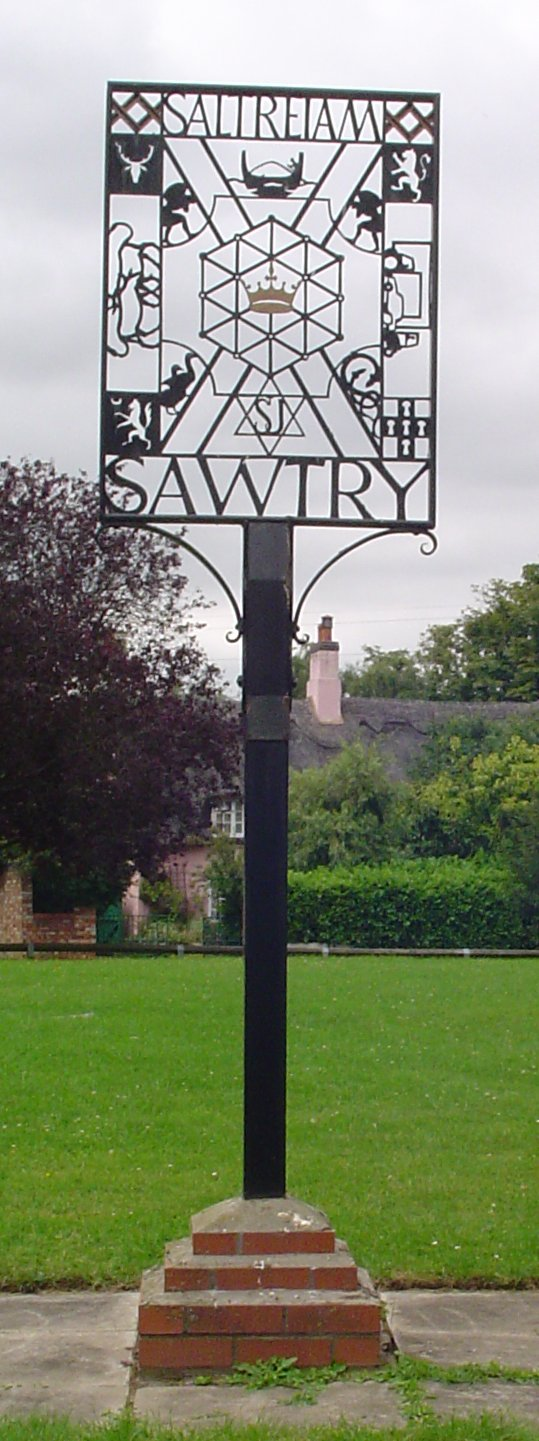
Village sign in Sawtry

Sawtry was listed as Saltrede in the Domesday Book of 1086 in the Hundred of Normancross in Huntingdonshire, containing four manors and 56 households. By 1086 there were three churches and two priests at Sawtry.

During the Dark Ages, Sawtry was divided into three parishes – All Saints, St. Andrew and Judith and originally got its name from the fact that it was a trading centre for salt, an essential commodity in the Middle Ages. The Cistercian Abbey of St Mary was founded in 1147 by Simon de Senlis grandson of Judith of Lens, niece of William the Conqueror who owned land in many parts of Britain but built her Manor in Sawtry and whom the Parish of Sawtry Judith is named after. The abbey took 91 years to complete and ministered to the local area both spiritually and physically. This was demolished in 1540 during the Dissolution of the Monasteries as part of the English Reformation, although traces of the abbey still remain.

Sawtry is twinned with the Gemeinde Weimar region in Germany.

== Government ==
As a civil parish, Sawtry has a parish council consisting of fifteen councillors. The village is represented on Huntingdonshire District Council by two councillors for the Sawtry ward, and on Cambridgeshire County Council by one councillor for the electoral division of Sawtry and Stilton. It is in the Huntingdon parliamentary constituency.

Sawtry was in the historic and administrative county of Huntingdonshire until 1965. From 1965, the village was part of the new administrative county of Huntingdon and Peterborough. Then in 1974, following the Local Government Act 1972, Sawtry became a part of the county of Cambridgeshire.

== Geography ==
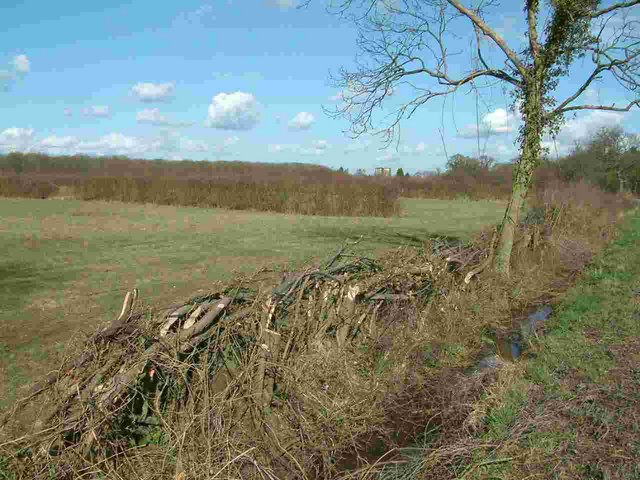
Ancient hedgerow near Monks Wood – March 2007

Sawtry is just west of the Fens, halfway between the city of Peterborough and the town of Huntingdon. Other nearby villages include Folksworth, Alconbury, Holme, Yaxley and Stilton. Being situated in close proximity to the A1(M), it is a sought-after location for commuters. It is approximately six miles north of the A14, and a fifty-minute car drive from both Stansted Airport and Luton Airport. The oldest known surviving hedgerow in England (established circa 1100) named Judith's Hedge runs next to the B1090 near Monks Wood and marks the boundary of the Parish of Sawtry Judith.

== Transport ==
The Bullock Road, an ancient droveway, now a byway, runs on the ridge to the west of Sawtry.

The A1(M), originally the Roman Ermine Street, then the Great North Road, runs immediately to the east of the village.

An improvement at Sawtry and Conington was planned in 1938. In September 1967, a new southbound carriageway started construction, to open in July 1968, which cost around £250,000, next to the northbound carriageway, built in December 1958, by RM Douglas, as part of an 8-mile (13 km) section. The new southbound carriageway created a 1.5-mile (2.4 km) 'lay-by'. The new carriageway diverted the former historic route onto a new southbound carriageway for 1.5 miles south of Holme Turn, to the Royal Oak pub.

Ordnance Survey maps from the 1920s show a narrow-gauge agricultural tramway running for a mile north east from Sawtry Roughs Farm (now demolished) to an interchange with the then Great Northern Railway.

== Demography ==
=== Population ===
In the period 1801 to 1901 the population of Sawtry was recorded every ten years by the UK census. During this time the population was in the range of 790 (the lowest was in 1801) and 1,393 (the highest was in 1851).

From 1901, a census was taken every ten years with the exception of 1941 (due to the Second World War). The separate parishes of Sawtry All Saints and Sawtry St Judith were combined into the single civil parish of Sawtry between 1931 and 1951.

Parish	1911	1921	1931	1951	1961	1971	1981	1991	2001	2011
Sawtry All Saints	818	723	702							
Sawtry St Judith	181	186	213							
Sawtry	994	909	915	1,113	986	1,749	3,651	4,865	5,568	6,536

All population census figures from report Historic Census figures Cambridgeshire to 2011 by Cambridgeshire Insight.

In 2011, the parish covered an area of 6,269 acres (2,537 hectares) and the population density of Sawtry in 2011 was 667.3 persons per square mile (257.6 per square kilometre).

== Culture and community ==
Sawtry has two public houses: The Bell and the Greystones. It also has an ex-services and working men's club. There is an infant school and a junior school in Sawtry; and a secondary school (Sawtry Village Academy) which educates many young people from nearby villages as well as Sawtry itself. Other amenities also include the local butchers, doctors, vets, garage, takeaway houses, the Co-Op, and multiple hair and beauty salons.

== Religious sites ==
The Church of All Saints is the Church of England parish church. Methodist Worship takes place at Sawtry Methodist Church. There is also a Roman Catholic community, served by the parish of St Luke, Peterborough.
