= Church of All Saints, Sawtry =

Church in Cambridgeshire, England

Coordinates: 52.4409°N 0.2775°W

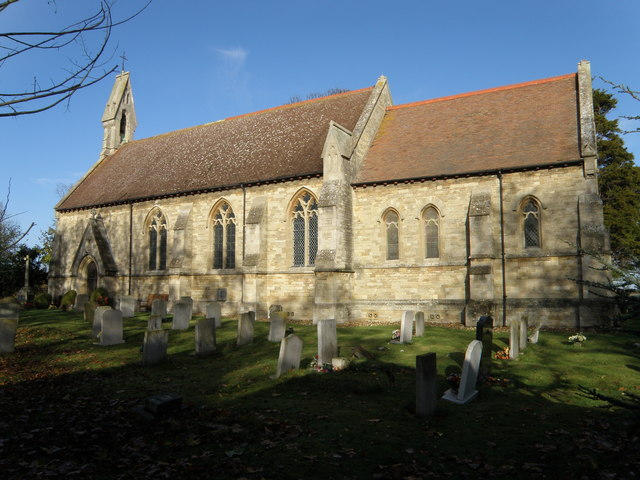
Church of All Saints

Church of All Saints is a Grade II listed building located in Sawtry, a village in Huntingdonshire, Cambridgeshire, England. It became a listed building on 28 January 1958.

Until the year 1880, there were two churches in Sawtry, All Saints' and St Andrew's. Both were demolished and the materials used in the erection of the new Church of All Saints. It was dedicated on 14 September 1880 by the Bishop of Ely.

It is in the Early Decorated style, from designs by Arthur Blomfield, architect. It consists of a chancel and nave. A western turret contains one bell, formerly belonging to Sawtry Abbey. There is a brass in the church, with three effigies, dated April, 1404. In the chancel, there is a stained window. The register of All Saints dates from the year 1591; that of St Andrew's from the year 1662. To the left as you enter the churchyard is the War Memorial.
