= Robert Fitzooth =

Fictitious identity for Robin Hood

Robert Fitzooth (or Fitztooth), Earl of Huntingdon (allegedly d. 1274), is a fictitious identity for Robin Hood. The name was first published in William Stukeley's Paleographica Britannica in 1746. By then the association of Robin with the earldom of Huntingdon had become conventional, thanks to Anthony Munday's 1598 play The Downfall of Robert Earl of Huntingdon; it was also generally believed that he had flourished in the reign of Richard I of England.

In actual history, David of Scotland was Earl of Huntingdon throughout Richard's reign, succeeded by his son John. David did have a son named Robert but he is believed to have died in infancy. Therefore the earl could not have been Robin Hood. Stukeley's genealogical "researches" then turned up a descendant of Earl Waltheof, and therefore a rival claimant to the earldom, related to the lords of Kyme, whom he named as Robert Fitzooth, son of William Fitzooth, who supposedly died in 1274: and he claimed that "Ooth" or Odo had become corrupted into "Hood".

This has been a popular identification for later writers of fiction, beginning at Pierce Egan the Younger's 1840 novel Robin Hood and Little John. In Egan's story there were, genealogically, two Roberts, Earls of Huntingdon between Waltheof and Robin Hood (to explain the historical time gap); had Robin Hood actually taken possession of the title, he would have been Robert III. The "disowning" according to the storyline came about because of a younger son of Waltheof and brother of Robert I, Philip Fitzooth, scheming to take over the title, disowned his baby grandnephew under the excuse that Robert II's marriage had not been recognized, thus baby Robin (named in the storyline after one of Gilbert's brothers when Gilbert adopted him) was raised as the son of Gilbert and his wife.

In Disney's The Story of Robin Hood and his Merrie Men (1952), Roger Lancelyn Green's 1956 novel, and the BBC's 2006–2009 Robin Hood series, the Earl of Huntingdon fell out with King John and was forced to flee north, taking refuge in Sherwood Forest where he spent the rest of his days. In the 1980s ITV series Robin of Sherwood, this Robert, portrayed as older than he would historically have been, is David's eldest son and survives to adulthood but is disinherited when outlawed.

The name "Fitzooth" was not applied to Robin Hood by anybody before Stukeley, nor is it otherwise known. It is now generally believed that Stukeley forged the Fitzooth family tree and that this Robert never existed. Medieval references to Robin Hood made him a yeoman, not a nobleman, although when the idea of a "disowned noble" Robin first arose in the sixteenth century there was consensus that Huntingdon was his earldom.

So the possibility of Robert Fitzooth being Robin Hood or even a real person lacks any support.
