= Mary Stuart Proclaiming Her Innocence =

Painting by Francesco Hayez

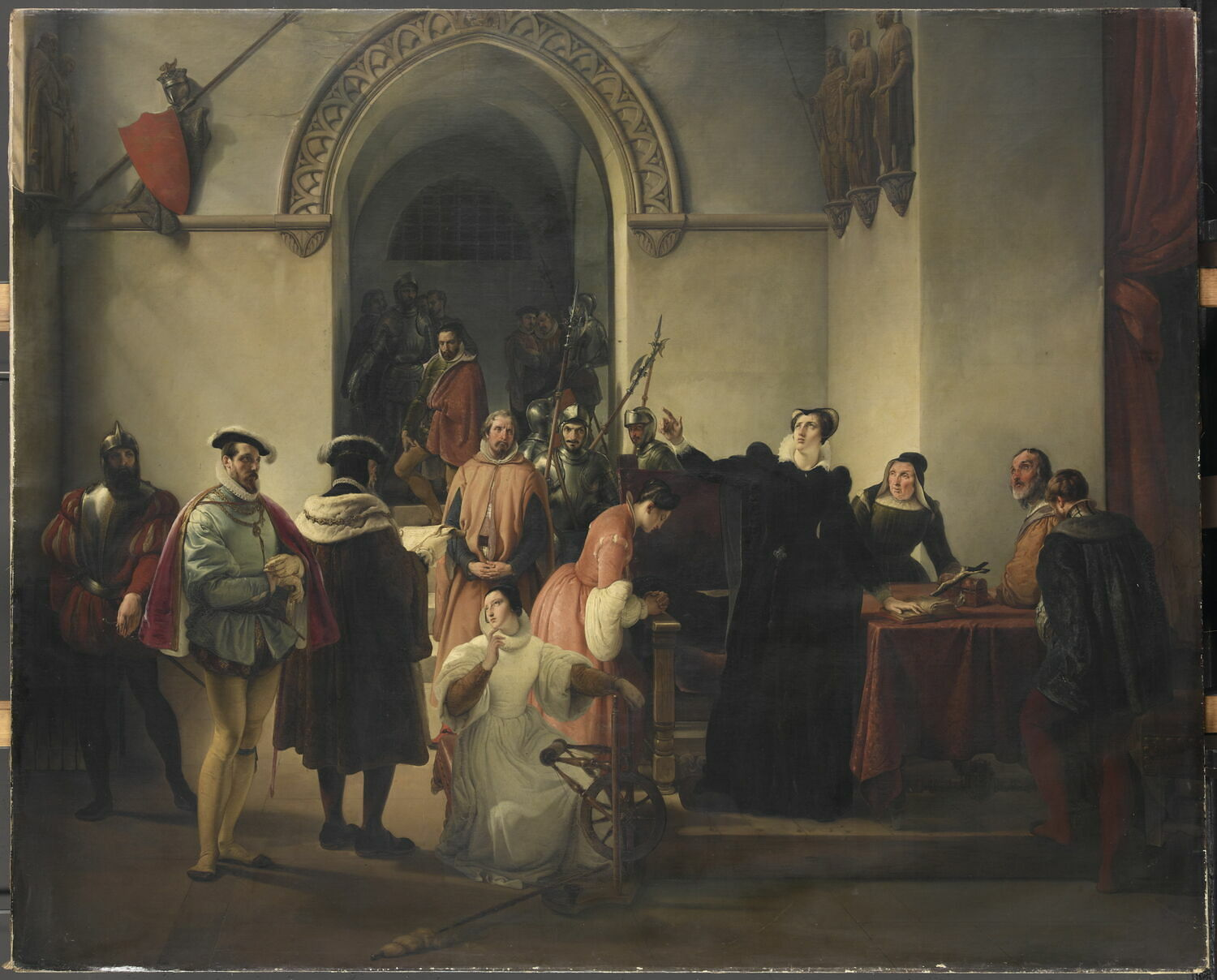
- Artist: Francesco Hayez
- Year: 1832
- Type: Oil on canvas, history painting
- Dimensions: 195 cm × 242 cm (77 in × 95 in)
- Location: Louvre, Paris

Mary Stuart Proclaiming Her Innocence (French: Marie Stuart Protestant de son innocence à la lecture de sa condamnation à mort) is an 1832 history painting by the Italian artist Francesco Hayez. It depicts the scene at Fotheringhay Castle in Northamptonshire on 25 October 1586 after Mary, Queen of Scots was found guilty of treason against her cousin Queen Elizabeth I of England. After reading her death sentence for her part in the Babington Plot she proclaims her innocence aloud. She was executed at Fotheringay in February 1587.

The painting was originally commissioned in 1827 by the Count of Arache and exhibited at the Pinacoteca di Brera in Milan in 1832. Today it is in the collection of the Louvre in Paris, having been acquired in 2012. Hayez also produced an 1827 painting of Mary Stuart ascending the steps of the scaffold shortly before her execution.

== Bibliography ==
- Banks, Stephen. The British Execution: 1500–1964. Bloomsbury Publishing, 2013.
- Boime, Albert. The Art of the Macchia and the Risorgimento: Representing Culture and Nationalism in Nineteenth-Century Italy. University of Chicago Press, 1993.
- Castellaneta, Carlo & Coradeschi, Sergio. L'opera completa di Hayez. Rizzoli, 1971.
- Mazzocca, Fernando. Francesco Hayez: catalogo ragionato. F. Motta, 1994.
