= Simon I Gurieli =

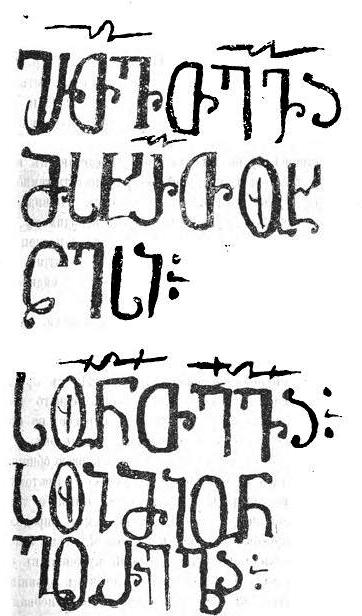
The inscription of the Zarzma Monastery mentioning Simon I Gurieli.

Simon I Gurieli (Georgian: სიმონ I გურიელი) was an eristavi (duke) of Guria in the 14th century. In his old age, he withdrew from political affairs and became a monk. Simon I Gurieli made a significant contribution to the Zarzma Monastery. His fresco portrait is preserved at Zarzma, on the southern face of a pillar beneath the dome, northwest of the church. The inscription accompanying the portrait identifies Simon I Gurieli as “Eristavt-Eristavi, Msakhurtukhutsesi, Eristavi of the Svans, Suimeon Gurieli”.
