= Simeon of Bulgaria =

Simeon of Bulgaria may refer to:

- Simeon I of Bulgaria, ruled over the First Bulgarian Empire 893–927
- Simeon Saxe-Coburg-Gotha or Simeon II of Bulgaria, de jure Tsar of Bulgaria 1943–1946, later elected Prime Minister of Bulgaria, served 2001–2005
