= Simeon I =

Simeon I may refer to:

- Simon I (High Priest) (310–291 or 300–270 BCE), in the Temple in Jerusalem
- Simeon I, Caucasian Albanian Catholicos in 706–707
- Simeon I of Bulgaria (864/865 – 927)
- Simeon of Moscow, Simeon Ivanovich Gordyi (the Proud), (1316–1353), Prince of Moscow and Grand Prince of Vladimir
- Simeon I of Yerevan, Catholicos of All Armenians in 1763–1780

== See also ==
- Simon I (disambiguation)
