= Simon III de Senlis =

English noble

Simon III de Senlis (c. 1138–1184) (or Senliz, St. Liz, etc.), Earl of Huntingdon and Northampton was an English nobleman.

He was the son of Simon II de Senlis, Earl of Huntingdon-Northampton and Isabel de Beaumont. Simon was in his minority when his father died in 1153. He was passed over as Earl of Huntington, in favour of King Malcolm IV of Scotland, who granted the earldom to his own brother William. Upon reaching of age, Simon was recognised in the earldom of Northampton in 1159. He succeeded to the earldom of Huntingdon, in 1174, upon the forfeiture by William, who had succeeded as king of Scotland.

Simon died in 1184 and was buried in the St Andrew's Priory, Northampton. His wife Alice died in 1185. The earldom of Huntingdon was inherited by Prince David of Scotland, while the earldom of Northampton reverted to the English crown.

== Marriage and issue ==
Simon married Alice, daughter of Gilbert de Gant, Earl of Lincoln and Rohaise de Clare, they are known to have had the following issue:

- Gunnor de Senlis
- Simon de Senlis

Both children predeceased their parents, without issue.

Peerage of England
| Preceded by Simon II of Senlis | Earl of Huntingdon; 1174–1184 | Succeeded by Prince David of Scotland |
