= William Herbert, 2nd Earl of Pembroke =

English nobleman

- Earls of Pembroke; Earl of Huntingdon
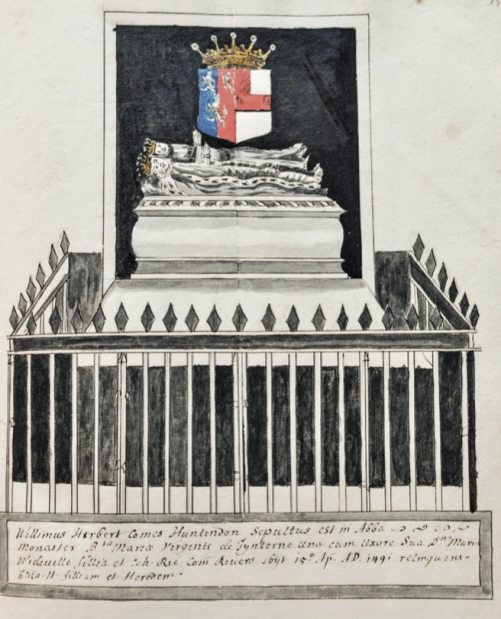
- Tomb of William Herbert, Earl of Huntingdon, and his wife Mary née Woodville
- Born: 5 March 1451; Raglan, Monmouthshire, Wales
- Died: 16 July 1491 (aged 40); Troy Parva, Monmouthshire, Wales
- Buried: Tintern Abbey, Chapel Hill
- Spouses: Mary Woodville; Katherine Plantagenet
- Issue: Elizabeth Herbert, 3rd Baroness Herbert
- Father: William Herbert, 1st Earl of Pembroke
- Mother: Anne Devereux

William Herbert, 2nd Earl of Pembroke (5 March 1451 – 16 July 1491) was a Welsh nobleman and politician.

== Early life ==
He was the son of William Herbert, 1st Earl of Pembroke and Anne Devereux. His paternal grandparents were William ap Thomas and Gwladys, daughter of Dafydd Gam, and his maternal grandparents were Walter Devereux, Lord Chancellor of Ireland and Elizabeth Merbury.

He succeeded his father in the earldom in 1469. In 1479, he was forced by Edward IV to surrender the earldom with its accompanying lands in Wales to Edward's son, the future Edward V, and was created Earl of Huntingdon. William had hoped to restore to his family the Earldom of Pembroke. Awarding lands in the south-west of England meant that Edward had moved the family influence out of Wales. A Yorkist, he married Mary Woodville, sister of the queen, Elizabeth Woodville, and they had one daughter, Elizabeth Herbert, 3rd Baroness Herbert.

== Later career ==
Herbert remained loyal to Richard III. After the rebellion of 1483 he received the post of Chief Justice of South Wales, which had been the Duke of Buckingham's. After his marriage to his second wife, Katherine, an illegitimate daughter of Richard III in 1484, he received an annuity of some £1,000 a year, nearly doubling his income. Katherine is presumed to have died by 1487, because when William participated in the coronation of his first wife's niece, Elizabeth of York, he was noted to have been a widower.

When Henry of Richmond landed in south Wales in 1485 Herbert's position forced Henry to take a roundabout route into England. It is likely that a Herbert agent first notified Richard III of Henry's landing. Herbert did not, however, fight at Bosworth.

== Death and succession ==
When he died, his only child, Elizabeth Herbert, received the Herbert lands, including Raglan Castle, but not his title. However, his earldom did not pass to his younger brother, Walter Herbert, as it had already been merged into the Crown. The earldom would however be granted again to the Herbert family in 1551 as the tenth creation to his nephew, Sir William Herbert, the son of Sir Richard Herbert, an illegitimate son of William's father. The Herbert family today still retains the earldom of Pembroke, among others.

== Notes ==
Peerage of England
Preceded by William Herbert	Earl of Pembroke; 1469–1479	Surrendered
Preceded by William Herbert	Baron Herbert; 1469–1491	Succeeded by Elizabeth Herbert
