= Warner Hastings, 15th Earl of Huntingdon =

British peer (1868–1939)

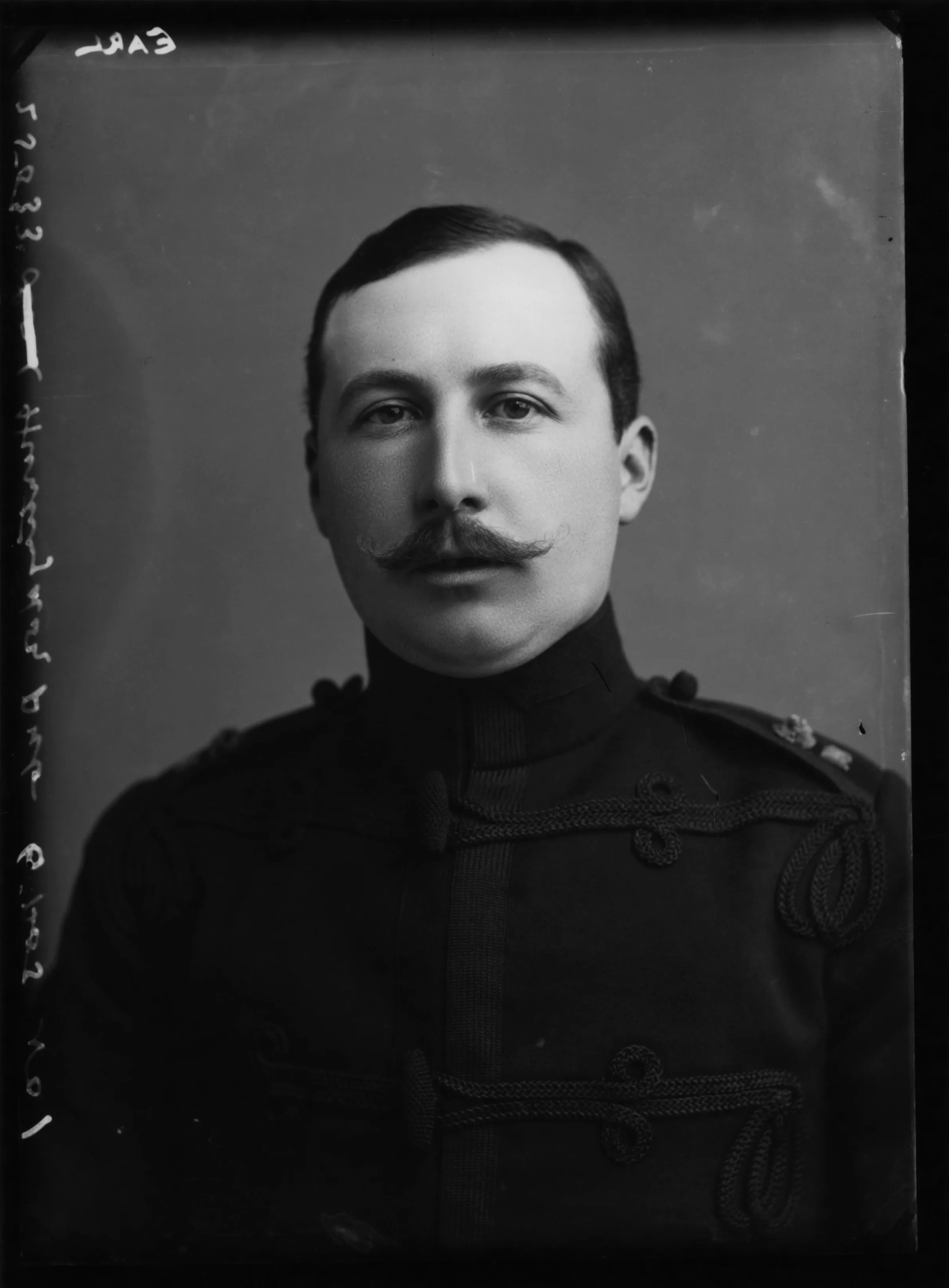
Portrait by Alexander Bassano, 1895

Hastings coat of arms

Lieutenant-Colonel Warner Francis John Plantagenet Hastings, 15th Earl of Huntingdon DL (8 July 1868 – 5 April 1939) was a British peer, and Deputy Lieutenant of King's County, Ireland.

== Family ==
Hastings was born at St Stephen's Green, Dublin, the son of Francis Power Plantagenet Hastings, 14th Earl of Huntingdon and Mary Anne Wilmot Westenra, daughter of Lt. Col. Hon. John Westenra. He succeeded his father to the title of 15th Earl of Huntingdon on 20 May 1885.

Lord Huntingdon married Maud Margaret Wilson, daughter of Sir Samuel Wilson, on 11 June 1892 at St George's, Hanover Square. The children of this marriage were:

- Lady Maud Kathleen Cairnes Plantagenet Hastings (28 March 1893 – 8 February 1965) married William Montagu Curzon-Herrick, son of Colonel Hon. Montagu Curzon and Esmé Fitzroy, on 28 July 1916
- Lady Norah Frances Hastings (12 September 1894 - 1985) married Francis Charles Adelbert Henry Needham, 4th Earl of Kilmorey, son of Francis Charles Needham, 3rd Earl of Kilmorey and Ellen Constance Baldock, on 10 February 1920
- Lady Marian Ileene Mabel Hastings (15 Septembter 1895 - 22 April 1947) married Captain Patrick Keith Cameron, son of Keith Cameron on 16 July 1918. Secondly Captain John Walter Wilson Bridges, son of Rear-Admiral Walter Bogue Bridges, in 1943.
- Francis John Clarence Westenra Plantagenet Hastings, 16th Earl of Huntingdon (30 January 1901 - 1990)

== Career ==
He was Page of Honour to the Viceregal Court of Ireland between 1880 and 1881, he also held the office of Deputy Lieutenant of King's County (now County Offaly).

He was commissioned an officer in the 4th (Queen's County Militia) Battalion, Prince of Wales's Leinster Regiment, later transferred to the 3rd (King's County Militia) Battalion and resigned with the rank of major in February 1900 when he was found unfit for active service in the Second Boer War. He was re-appointed in the same rank on 4 June 1901, and retired as lieutenant-colonel in 1905. He served again in the First World War.

He was a Master of Fox Hounds to the Ormond and East Galway hunts in Ireland, and to the Atherstone (Warwickshire)and North Staffordshire hunts in England.

Lord Huntingdon settled in England by 1925, where he lived at Burton Hall, near Loughborough, Leicestershire. He died in 1939, aged 70, and was buried in the parish churchyard of St Helen's, Ashby-de-la-Zouch.

== Recreations ==
He was a member of Lough Derg Corinthian Yacht Club in 1896.

== Home ==
He gave his address in 1896 as Sharavogue, Roscrea.

Peerage of England
Preceded by Francis Power Plantagenet Hastings	Earl of Huntingdon; 1885–1939	Succeeded by Francis John Clarence Westenra Plantagenet Hastings
