= Henry of Scotland =

Heir apparent to David I (1114–1152)

Henry
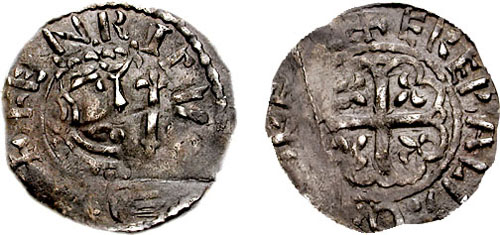
- Coin depicting Henry of Scotland (left) and his coat of arms (right)
- Born: 1114
- Died: 12 June 1152 (aged 37–38); Newcastle or Roxburgh
- Burial: Kelso Abbey, Scottish Borders
- Spouse: Ada de Warenne (m. 1139)
- Issue: Malcolm IV the Maiden; William I the Lion; Margaret, Duchess of Brittany; David, 8th Earl of Huntingdon; Ada, Countess of Holland; Marjorie, Countess of Angus
- House: Dunkeld
- Father: David I of Scotland
- Mother: Maud, 2nd Countess of Huntingdon

Henry of Scotland (Eanric mac Dabíd, 1114 – 12 June 1152) was heir apparent to the Kingdom of Alba. He was also the 3rd Earl of Northumbria and the 3rd Earl of Huntingdon. He was the son of King David I of Scotland and his wife, Maud, 2nd Countess of Huntingdon.

== Earldom ==
David I of Scotland, Henry's father, invaded England in 1136. His army was met by Stephen of Blois at Carlisle. Instead of battle, there was a negotiated settlement that included Henry performing homage to Stephen in exchange for Carlisle and the Earldom of Huntingdon. Henry's journey to Stephen's court for Easter (1136) was met with resentment, including an accusation of treason, which brought about his return at his father's insistence.

After another invasion by his father, Henry was finally invested with the Earldom of Northumbria in 1139. Later in the year, Henry met with Stephen at Nottingham, where he was also reinvested with Carlisle and Cumberland. Henry then paid homage to Stephen for his earldom.

Henry's inclusion into King Stephen's inner circle was highlighted by his arranged marriage to Ada de Warenne. This marriage secured Henry's place within Stephen's kingdom. Following Stephen's capture by forces of Empress Matilda, Henry held the Earldom of Northumbria as a Scottish fief.

Earl Henry had been in poor health throughout the 1140s. He died suddenly on 12 June 1152. His death occurred in either Newcastle or Roxburgh, both located in those areas of Northumbria which he and his father had attached to the Scots crown in the period of English weakness after the death of Henry I of England. Unlike in the case of the English king, who had been left without legitimate male descendants due to the sinking of the White Ship, there was no succession crisis. This was because Earl Henry had left behind three sons to carry forward the lineage of his father.

On Henry's death, the Huntingdon earldom passed to his half-brother Simon II de Senlis.

== Family ==
In 1139, Henry married Ada de Warenne. Ada was the daughter of William de Warenne, 2nd Earl of Surrey (died 1138) and Elizabeth of Vermandois, who in turn was the daughter of Hugh of Vermandois. The children of Henry and Ada (in an approximate order of birth) were:

- Malcolm IV of Scotland (1141–1165)
- William I of Scotland (c. 1142–1214)
- Ada of Huntingdon (died 1206), married in 1161 Floris III, Count of Holland
- Margaret of Huntingdon (died 1201)
- David of Scotland, 8th Earl of Huntingdon (1152–1219)
- Matilda (or Maud) of Huntingdon, died unmarried in 1152
- Marjorie of Huntingdon, married Gille Críst, Earl of Angus

== Bibliography ==
- Barlow, Professor Frank, The Feudal Kingdom of England 1012 - 1216, London,1955, tree opposite p. 288.
- Burke, John & John Bernard. The Royal Families of England, Scotland, and Wales, with their Descendants, Sovereigns and Subjects, London, 1851, vol. 2, p. xlvii and pedigree XXIX.
- Dunbar, Sir Archibald H., Bt., Scottish Kings, a Revised Chronology of Scottish History, 1005 - 1625, Edinburgh, 1899, pp. 64–65.
- Everard, Judith; Jones, Michael C. E., eds. (1999). The Charters of Duchess Constance of Brittany and Her Family, 1171-1221. The Boydell Press.
- Howard, Joseph Jackson, LL.D., F.S.A., Miscellanea Genealogica et Heraldica, New Series, volume I, London, 1874, p. 337.
- Oram, Richard (2011). Domination and Lordship: Scotland, 1070-1230. Edinburgh University Press.
- Stringer, Keith, "Henry, earl of Northumberland (c.1115-1152)", Oxford Dictionary of National Biography, Oxford University Press, 2004 accessed 20 May 2007
- Stringer, Keith, "Senlis, Simon (II) de, earl of Northampton and earl of Huntingdon (d. 1153)", Oxford Dictionary of National Biography, Oxford University Press, 2004 accessed 20 May 2007

Henry of Scotland House of Dunkeld Born: ? 1114 Died: 12 June 1152
Preceded by Maud	Earl of Huntingdon; 1130–1138	Succeeded by Simon de Senlis
Preceded by Simon de Senlis	Earl of Huntingdon; 1138–1141	Succeeded by Simon de Senlis
Vacant Title last held by Robert de Mowbray	Earl of Northumbria; 1139–1152	Succeeded by William fitz Henry
