= Guichard d'Angle =

Poitevin knight

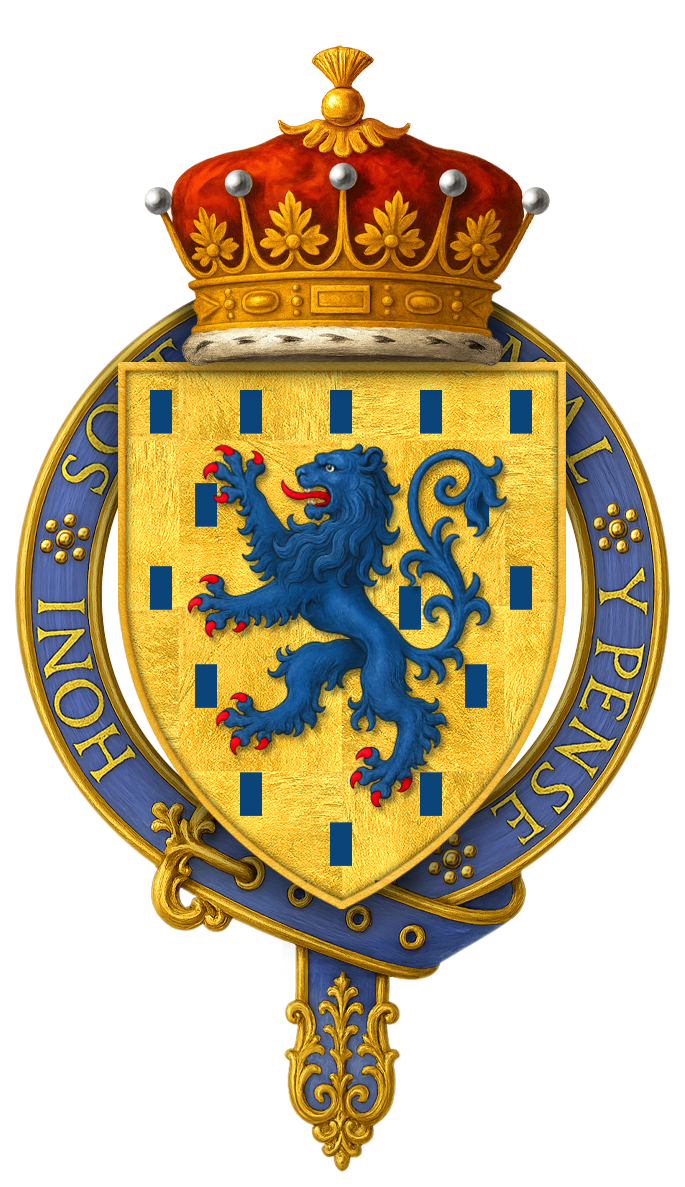
Arms of Sir Guichard d'Angle, Earl of Huntingdon, KG

Guichard (IV) d'Angle, Earl of Huntingdon (c. 1310–1380) was a Poitevin knight, a Knight of the Garter and a companion of Edward the Black Prince. He was born in a noble family from Angles-sur-l'Anglin in North-Eastern Poitou, sometime between 1305 and 1315.

Guichard first appears in a muster roll of 1346 as a knight. In October of that year, he commanded the defence of Niort against a raiding party of Henry of Lancaster. In 1349 he served as a French deputy commander in Saintonge and was appointed seneschal the following year. In 1351 he was captured in the battle of Saintes and was ransomed later, in 1353.

In the run-up to the Battle of Poitiers (1356) Guichard seized the fortress of Rochefort and was appointed its castellan by the dauphin. He fought at Poitiers on the French side, was captured and released for ransom. In 1360 he was in Paris with dauphin Charles. He participated in the preliminary discussions of the Anglo-French truce at Longjumeau but didn't sign the actual Treaty of Brétigny. However, Guichard was charged with transferring the fortress of La Rochelle to the English under the terms of the treaty. In 1361 overlordship over Guichard's lands was formally transferred to the King of England.

From 1364 to 1372, Guichard participated in the English administration of Aquitaine and was appointed marshal. He joined the Black Prince's expedition to Spain during Castilian Civil War between 1366 and 1369 and fought in the Battle of Najera of 1367. After the Spanish campaign, he was sent to Rome. In his absence the hostilities resumed, and (according to Froissart) Guichard's embassy had to split and find the way through Savoy, Auvergne and Brittany. He joined John of Hastings, earl of Pembroke in a raid into the valley of Loire. He was a member of John Chandos' troop when Chandos was mortally wounded. Shortly afterwards, Guichard was appointed governor of Poitou. In 1370, Guichard participated in the sack of Limoges by Prince Edward's forces. He spent the winter of 1371–1372 in England, where he was made Knight of the Garter. On 22 June 1372, he was captured on the way back to the continent in the Battle of La Rochelle together with Hastings. He couldn't ransom himself out because his lands were taken by the French. He was transferred to Olivier de Mauny in 1374 and was exchanged in 1375. He was appointed tutor of Richard, Prince of Wales, and at his coronation in 1377 King Richard made Guichard Earl of Huntingdon for life and granted him an additional pension.
