= Baron Wilmington =

Barony in the Peerage of the United Kingdom

The title of Baron Wilmington has been created twice in the various British peerages. The first creation was in 1728 in the Peerage of Great Britain for Sir Spencer Compton, who was later made Earl of Wilmington. The second creation was in 1812 in the Peerage of the United Kingdom, as a subsidiary title for the Marquess of Northampton.
