= Mary Woodville =

English noblewoman (1456–1481)

- Countess of Pembroke; Countess of Huntingdon
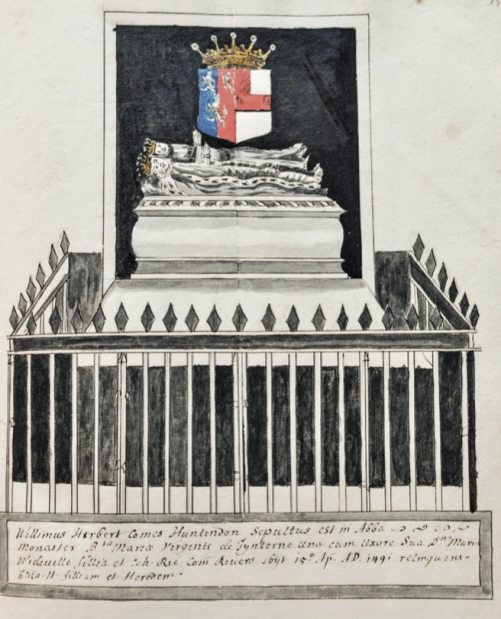
- Tombs of Mary Herbert (née Woodville), and William Herbert, earl of Huntingdon.
- Born: 1456; Grafton Regis, Northamptonshire, Kingdom of England
- Died: 1481 (aged 24–25)
- Buried: Tintern Abbey, Chapel Hill
- Spouse: William Herbert, 2nd Earl of Pembroke
- Issue: Elizabeth Herbert, 3rd Baroness Herbert
- Father: Richard Woodville, 1st Earl Rivers
- Mother: Jacquetta of Luxembourg

Mary Woodville, Countess of Pembroke (c. 1456–1481) was a sister of Edward IV's Queen consort, Elizabeth Woodville, and of Anthony Woodville, 2nd Earl Rivers. She later became the first wife of William Herbert, 2nd Earl of Pembroke, by whom she had one daughter.

== Biography ==
She was born in about 1456 to Richard Woodville, 1st Earl Rivers and his wife, Jacquetta of Luxembourg. After King Edward IV's public recognition of Elizabeth Woodville as his wife, the new queen sought to raise her family's standing by arranging a series of advantageous marriages for her five brothers and seven unwed sisters. In September 1466, Mary was betrothed to William Herbert, the eldest son and heir of the first Earl of Pembroke. Lord Herbert had been Henry VII's guardian. The young William was recognized as Lord Dunster in view of his approaching marriage (a grant of the lordship of Dunster and all the possessions of its attainted lord, James Luttrell, in Somerset, Devon and Suffolk, had been secured by his father in June 1463).

In January 1467, Mary Woodville was married to Lord Dunster at St George's Chapel, Windsor Castle "amid profuse magnificence." The bride was about ten or eleven years old; her groom, aged fifteen.

Two years later, Lord Dunster's father, the first Earl of Pembroke, was executed on the orders of Richard Neville, the Earl of Warwick. Nothing seems to have aggravated Warwick more than the marriage of the Lady Mary, the Queen's sister, to Herbert's eldest son. Dunster became the second Earl of Pembroke following the death of his father in 1469 and henceforth Mary was styled Countess of Pembroke.

Pembroke proved rather ineffectual in governing South Wales. Mary's death in 1481 considerably weakened her husband's links with the Prince of Wales's associates, and he was forced to give up the earldom of Pembroke for that of Huntingdon, and a less valuable endowment in Somerset and Dorset. In 1484, he took as his second wife, Catherine Plantagenet, the illegitimate daughter of King Richard III; however, this marriage failed to produce offspring.

Ultimately, Herbert only had one child, a daughter by his first marriage, Elizabeth Herbert, 3rd Baroness Herbert, who later married Charles Somerset, later Earl of Worcester. Elizabeth was of great importance to the Somerset family, as she brought to them wealth and a legitimate relationship to royalty. The barony of Herbert was created by patent in favour of her husband, although during her lifetime she held the barony of Herbert in her own right.
