= Simon I de Senlis, Earl of Huntingdon-Northampton =

Norman nobleman

Simon I de Senlis (sometimes spelled Senliz or St. Liz), 1st Earl of Northampton and 2nd Earl of Huntingdon jure uxoris (died between 1111 and 1113) was a Norman nobleman.

In around 1096, Simon joined the First Crusade to the Holy Land. There he would have seen the Church of the Holy Sepulchre near the centre of Jerusalem, which he later copied when building one of the four remaining round churches in England, The Holy Sepulchre, Northampton.

In 1098 Simon was captured during the Vexin campaign of King William Rufus and was subsequently ransomed. He witnessed King Henry I’s Charter of Liberties issued at his coronation in 1100. He attested royal charters in England from 1100 to 1103, 1106 to 1107, and 1109 to 1111. Sometime in the period 1093–1100, he and his wife, Maud, founded the Priory of St Andrew's, Northampton. He witnessed a grant of King Henry I to Bath Abbey on 8 August 1111 at Bishop's Waltham, as the king was crossing to Normandy.

As well as The Holy Sepulchre church in Northampton, Simon built Northampton Castle and the town walls.

Simon subsequently went abroad and died at La Charité-sur-Loire, sometime between 1111 and 1113, and was buried in the new priory church.

== Family ==
Simon was the third son of Laudri de Senlis, sire of Chantilly and Ermenonville (in Picardy), and his spouse, Ermengarde.

Simon married in or before 1090 Maud of Huntingdon, daughter of Waltheof, Earl of Northumbria, Northampton and Huntingdon, and Judith of Lens, niece of William the Conqueror. This Judith had earlier refused to wed Simon; she had fled abroad to avoid her uncle's wrath.

Simon and Maud had three children:

- Simon II de Senlis, Earl of Huntingdon-Northampton,
- Saint Waltheof of Melrose, and
- Maud de Senlis, who married (1st) Robert Fitz Richard (of the de Clare family), of Little Dunmow, Essex, had issue, then following his death married (2nd) Saer de Quincy, Lord of Long Buckby in Northamptonshire

Following Simon's death, his widow, Maud married, around Christmas 1113, David I, nicknamed the Saint, who became King of Scots in 1124. David was recognized as Earl of Huntingdon to the exclusion of his step-son, Simon; the earldom of Northampton reverted to the crown. Maud died in 1130/31.

== Notes ==
Preceded by Vacant; Last held by: Waltheof	Earl of Huntingdon; 1080–1111/1113	Succeeded by David I of Scotland
Preceded by Vacant; Last held by: Waltheof	Earl of Northampton; 1080–1111/1113	Succeeded by Simon II of St Liz
