= Matilda, Countess of Northampton =

Queen of Scotland from 1124 to 1130

Matilda
- Countess of Northampton

Queen consort of Alba (Scotland)
- Tenure: 1124–c.1130
- Coronation: April or May 1124
- Born: 1072; Belford, Northumberland
- Died: April 23, 1130 (aged 58); Scone, Perthshire, Scotland
- Burial: Dunfermline, Fife, Scotland
- Spouse: Simon de Senlis m. c.1090; dec. c.1111 David I of Scotland m. 1113
- Issue: Matilda of St Liz; Simon of St Liz; Waltheof of Melrose; Malcolm of Scotland; Henry of Scotland, 3rd Earl of Huntingdon; Claricia; Hodierna
- Father: Waltheof, Earl of Northumbria
- Mother: Judith of Lens

Matilda, Countess of Northampton (c. 1074–1130) or Maud, was Queen of Alba as the wife of King David I. She was the great-niece of William the Conqueror and the granddaughter of Earl Siward.

== Biography ==
Matilda was the daughter of Waltheof of Northampton, the Anglo-Saxon Earl of Huntingdon and Northampton, and his French wife Judith of Lens. Her father was the last of the major Anglo-Saxon earls to remain powerful after the Norman conquest of England in 1066, and the son of Siward, Earl of Northumbria. Her mother was the niece of William the Conqueror, which makes Matilda his grand-niece. Through her ancestors the Counts of Boulogne, she was also a descendant of Alfred the Great and Charles the Bald and a cousin of Godfrey of Bouillon.

Matilda was married to Simon de Senlis (or St Liz) in about 1090. Earlier, William had tried to get Maud's mother, Judith, to marry Simon. He received the honour of Huntingdon (whose lands stretched across much of eastern England) probably in right of his wife from William Rufus before the end of the year 1090.

Matilda had three known children with Simon:

- Matilda of St Liz (Maud) (d. 1140); she married Robert Fitz Richard of Tonbridge; she married secondly Saer de Quincy, 1st Earl of Winchester.
- Simon II of St Liz (d. 1153)
- Saint Waltheof of Melrose (c. 1100–1159/1160)

Matilda's first husband died sometime after 1111, and Matilda next married David, the brother-in-law of Henry I of England, in 1113. Through the marriage, David gained control over his wife's vast estates in England, in addition to his own lands in Cumbria and Strathclyde. They had four children (two sons and two daughters):

1. Malcolm (born in 1113 or later, died young)
2. Henry (c. 1114–1152)
3. Claricia (died unmarried)
4. Hodierna (died young and unmarried)

In 1124, David became King of Scots. Matilda's two sons by different fathers, Simon and Henry, would later vie for the Earldom of Huntingdon.

In 1105, Holy Trinity church in Old Bewick was given by Matilda to Tynemouth Priory

Matilda died in 1130 or 1131 and was buried at Scone Abbey in Perthshire, but she appears in a charter of dubious origin dated 1147.

== Depictions in fiction ==
Matilda appears as a character in Elizabeth Chadwick's novel The Winter Mantle (2003), as well as Alan Moore's novel Voice of the Fire (1995) and Nigel Tranter's novel David the Prince (1980).

== Sources ==
- Beckensall, Stan (2001). Northumberland. The Power of Place. Stroud, Gloucestershire: Tempus Publishing Ltd. ISBN 0 7524 1907 2.

Scottish royalty
Preceded by Sybilla of Normandy	Queen consort of Scotland; 1124–1130	Succeeded by Ermengarde de Beaumont
