= Simon II de Senlis, Earl of Huntingdon-Northampton =

Anglo-Norman nobleman

Simon II de Senlis (or Senliz, St. Liz, etc.), 4th Earl of the Honour of Huntingdon and Northampton (c. 1098–1153) was an Anglo-Norman nobleman. He was the son of Simon I de Senlis, Earl of Huntingdon-Northampton and Maud, Countess of Huntingdon. He married Isabel, daughter of Robert de Beaumont, 2nd Earl of Leicester and they had a son Simon.

He was prominent in the Anarchy, fighting for Stephen of England in 1141 at the Battle of Lincoln. He continued to support Stephen's side; R. H. C. Davis calls him 'staunch' and 'consistently loyal' and surmises that Simon calculated that if the Empress Matilda won, his earldom of Northampton would be taken over by her uncle David I of Scotland.

Simon was rewarded by becoming Earl of Huntingdon. He died in 1153 just before Henry II of England took over, whereupon the king restored the Earldom of Huntingdon-Northampton to his ally Malcolm IV of Scotland. His widow, Countess Isabel de Beaumont, remarried to baron Gervase Paganell.

== Source ==
- K. Stringer, 'Senlis, Simon (II) de, earl of Northampton and earl of Huntingdon (d. 1153)', Oxford Dictionary of National Biography (Oxford University Press, 2004), accessed 20 May 2007.

Preceded by Henry of Scotland	Earl of Huntingdon; 1152–1153	Succeeded by Malcolm IV of Scotland
Vacant Title last held by Simon I de Senlis	Earl of Northampton ?1140–1153	Vacant Title next held by William de Bohun
