= Judith of Lens =

Niece of William the Conqueror (c. 1054–1090)

- Born: 1054 or 1055; Lens, Normandy
- Died: after 1086; Fotheringhay, Northamptonshire, c. 1090
- Noble family: House of Boulogne
- Spouse: Waltheof, 1st Earl of Northampton
- Issue more...: Maud, Countess of Huntingdon
- Father: Lambert II, Count of Lens
- Mother: Adelaide of Normandy

Judith of Lens (born Normandy, between 1054 and 1055 – died Fotheringhay, c. 1090) was a niece of William the Conqueror. She was a daughter of Count Lambert II of Lens and Adelaide of Normandy (Countess of Aumale), the sister of William the Conqueror.

== Life ==
In 1075, Judith's husband, Waltheof, Earl of Northumbria, joined the Revolt of the Earls against William. It was the last serious act of resistance against the Norman Conquest of England. Some sources claim that Judith betrayed Waltheof to the bishop of Winchester, who informed her uncle, the king. Other sources say that Waltheof was innocent and that it was he who notified the bishop and king of the plot. Waltheof was executed on 31 May 1076 at St Giles Hill, near Winchester.

After Waltheof's execution, Judith was betrothed by William to Simon I of St. Liz, 1st Earl of Northampton. Judith refused to marry Simon and fled the country to avoid William's anger. He then (temporarily) confiscated all Judith's English estates. Simon married Judith's daughter, Maud, in or before 1090.

== Marriage and children ==
In 1070, Judith married Earl Waltheof of Huntingdon and Northumbria.

They had:

1. Maud, Countess of Huntingdon was married to Simon I de Senlis, Earl of Huntingdon-Northampton. She brought the earldom of Huntingdon to her second husband, David I of Scotland.
2. Adelise, married Raoul III de Conches

== Properties ==
Judith held properties in 10 counties in the Midlands and East Anglia. Before the Norman invasion, these would have been lands held by her Saxon husband, Waltheof. After the transfer of property to the Normans, Waltheof was left with only one manor in his name.

Judith's holdings included land and properties in:

- Elstow, Bedfordshire
- Kempston, Bedfordshire
- Potton, Bedfordshire
- Hitchin, Hertfordshire
- Sawtry, Huntingdonshire – the parish of Sawtry Judith is named after the countess.
- Ashby Folville, Leicestershire
- Lowesby, Leicestershire
- Earls Barton, Northamptonshire
- Great Doddington, Northamptonshire
- Grendon, Northamptonshire
- Merton, Oxfordshire
- Piddington, Oxfordshire
- Toteham (Tottenham)

Judith held eight manors in her own name – i.e. manors which the Domesday Book of 1086 shows were not let, by her, to local lords. Those eight manors, scattered around the ten counties, may have been used by Judith as homes when visiting her various estates. Included in them were the manors of Elstow and Kempston in Bedfordshire.

Judith founded Elstow Abbey in around 1078, as a Benedictine nunnery, possibly as a memorial to Waltheof. She endowed the Abbey with a considerable amount of her properties in several counties. Judith also founded All Saints church in Kempston. Given these strong local connections, it is possible that Judith's primary home may have been at the manor at Kempston. Judith also founded a church at Hitchin and Elstow Abbey held a large amount of her property in that area.

== Sources ==
- Bosnos, Karen (2010). "Treason and Politics in Anglo-Norman Histories". In Billado, Tracey L; Tuten, Belle S (eds.). Feud, Violence and Practice: Essays in Medieval Studies in Honor of Stephen D. White. Ashgate Publishing. pp. 293–306. ISBN 9780754664116.
- LoPrete, Kimberly A. (2007). Adela of Blois: Countess and Lord (c.1067-1137). Four Courts Press. ISBN 978-1-85182-563-9.
- Warren, Wilfred Lewis (1973). Henry II. University of California Press. ISBN 0-520-02282-3.
- Wyatt, David (2009). Slaves and Warriors in Medieval Britain and Ireland, 800–1200. Brill. ISBN 978 90 04 17533 4.
