= Barnsley by-election =

Barnsley by-election may refer to:

- 1897 Barnsley by-election, played a role in development of the ILP
- 1938 Barnsley by-election
- 1953 Barnsley by-election
- 1996 Barnsley East by-election, caused loss of Conservatives' parliamentary majority
- 2011 Barnsley Central by-election, followed the jailing of Eric Illsley; Lib Dem vote collapsed
