= Howard baronets of Great Rissington (1955) =

The Howard baronetcy, of Great Rissington in the County of Gloucester, was created in the Baronetage of the United Kingdom on 1 December 1955 for Sir Seymour Howard, Lord Mayor of London in 1954. His eldest son, the 2nd Baronet, was Lord Mayor of London in 1971. As of 2026 the title is held by the latter's eldest son, the 3rd Baronet, who succeeded in 2001. He was Lord Mayor of London in 2000.

== Howard baronets, of Great Rissington (1955) ==
- Sir (Harold Walter) Seymour Howard, 1st Baronet (1888–1967)
- Sir Hamilton Edward de Coucey Howard, 2nd Baronet (1915–2001)
- Sir David Howarth Seymour Howard, 3rd Baronet (born 1945)

The heir apparent is the current Baronet's eldest son Robert Picton Seymour Howard (born 1971).
