= John Neal (British politician) =

British judge

His Honour John Neal MC (17 August 1889 – 8 September 1962) was an English Judge and Liberal Party politician.

== Background ==
He was the son of Arthur Neal MP, Parliamentary Secretary to the Ministry of Transport and Annie Elizabeth Neal. He was educated at Leys School, Cambridge and King's College, Cambridge. He married, in 1940, Rosemary Young. They had three sons.

== War 1914–1918 ==
At the age of 25 he volunteered at the outbreak of war. He served in the European War with the RNVR, then in France with the Royal Artillery as a Major. He was awarded the Military Cross 1914–15 Star.

== Political career ==
In 1922 at the age of 33, Neal followed his father into politics, also as a supporter of Prime Minister David Lloyd George. He was National Liberal candidate for the Wansbeck Division of Northumberland at the 1922 General Election. This was a seat that the Liberals had held in 1918 with the help of the official endorsement from the Coalition Government. However, by 1922 the Unionists had ended the coalition and a Unionist candidate intervened in Wansbeck. While Neal still retained the endorsement of David Lloyd George and his organisation, he did not have the support of the Liberal party led by H. H. Asquith who also intervened in Wansbeck. Unsurprisingly, the seat was lost with Neal finishing third in a field of four. In 1923 following reunion between the Lloyd George and Asquith factions, Neal was selected as Liberal candidate for the Barnsley Division of Yorkshire at the 1923 General Election. A National Liberal had come close to winning in 1922 but by 1923, the Unionists chose to intervene in the contest and Neal was edged into third place.

General Election 1923: Barnsley Electorate 35,684
Party	Candidate	Votes	%	±%
Labour	John Samuel Potts	12,674	48.0	−7.1
Conservative	William Craven-Ellis	6,884	26.0	n/a
Liberal	John Neal	6,881	26.0	−18.9
Majority		5,790	22.0	+11.8
Turnout			74.1	−1.6
Labour hold		Swing	n/a	

He contested Barnsley again at the 1924 General Election. This time there was no Unionist candidate, but he narrowly failed to gain the seat;

General Election 1924: Barnsley Electorate 36,469
Party	Candidate	Votes	%	±%
Labour	John Samuel Potts	14,738	51.7	+3.7
Liberal	John Neal	13,785	48.5	+22.5
Majority		953	3.4	−18.6
Turnout			78.2	+4.1
Labour hold		Swing	-9.4	

He did not stand for parliament again and concentrated on his legal career.

== War 1939–1945 ==
At the age of 49 he was placed on the Officers' Emergency Reserve from 1938 to 1940. He was assigned to the Ministry of Economic Warfare and the Ministry of Food from 1940 to 1942.

== Professional career ==
In 1920 he received a Call to Bar by the Inner Temple. In 1942 he was appointed as a County Court judge. He was Deputy Chairman of the Quarter Sessions of the West Riding of Yorkshire from 1942 to 1945. He retired in 1961.
