= Sir David Howard, 3rd Baronet =

English aristocrat and businessman (born 1945)

Sir David Howarth Seymour Howard, 3rd Baronet (born 1945) is an English aristocrat, businessman, and public official.

== Early life ==
Howard was born on 29 December 1945. His father was Sir Hamilton Edward de Coucey Howard, 2nd Baronet (1915–2001) and his mother, Elizabeth Howarth Ludlow. His paternal grandfather was Sir Seymour Howard, 1st Baronet (1886-1967). He graduated from Radley College, a boarding school in Radley, Oxfordshire, and from Worcester College, Oxford, where he received a Masters of Arts degree.

== Career ==
=== Business ===
He joined the Charles Stanley Group in 1967. He was appointed Managing Partner of the firm in 1971, Managing Director in 1988, and Chairman in 1999. He stepped down as group chief executive of the business in 2014.

He sits on the Board of Directors of the Association of Private Client Investment Managers and Stockbrokers (APCIMS) and the Chartered Institute for Securities & Investment.

=== Public service ===
He served as an Alderman of the City of London in 1986, Sheriff of the City of London in 1997, and Lord Mayor of London from 2000 to 2001. He was County Master of the Worshipful Company of Gardeners in 1990. He also sat on the Board of Trustees of the London Gardens Society.

He became the 3rd Howard baronet of Great Rissington in 2001. He also became a Knight in the Most Venerable Order of the Hospital of St. John of Jerusalem in 2000. He also received the Grand Cordon of the Order of Independence of Jordan in 2001.

== Personal life ==
He married Valerie Picton Crosse on 6 June 1968. They have four children, Caroline Picton Seymour Howard (born 1970), Robert Picton Seymour Howard (born 1971), Victoria Picton Seymour Howard (born 1975), and James Picton Seymour Howard (born 1979).

He had a home in Monkwell Square in London. He is a churchwarden at St Michael's, Cornhill in the City of London.

Civic offices
Preceded by Sir Clive Martin	Lord Mayor of London; 2000–2001	Succeeded by Michael Oliver
Baronetage of the United Kingdom
Preceded by Edward Howard	Baronet (of Great Rissington); 2001–present	Incumbent
