= 2011 Barnsley Central by-election =

Parliamentary by-election in the UK

- 3 March 2011

Barnsley Central constituency
- Turnout: 36.5%
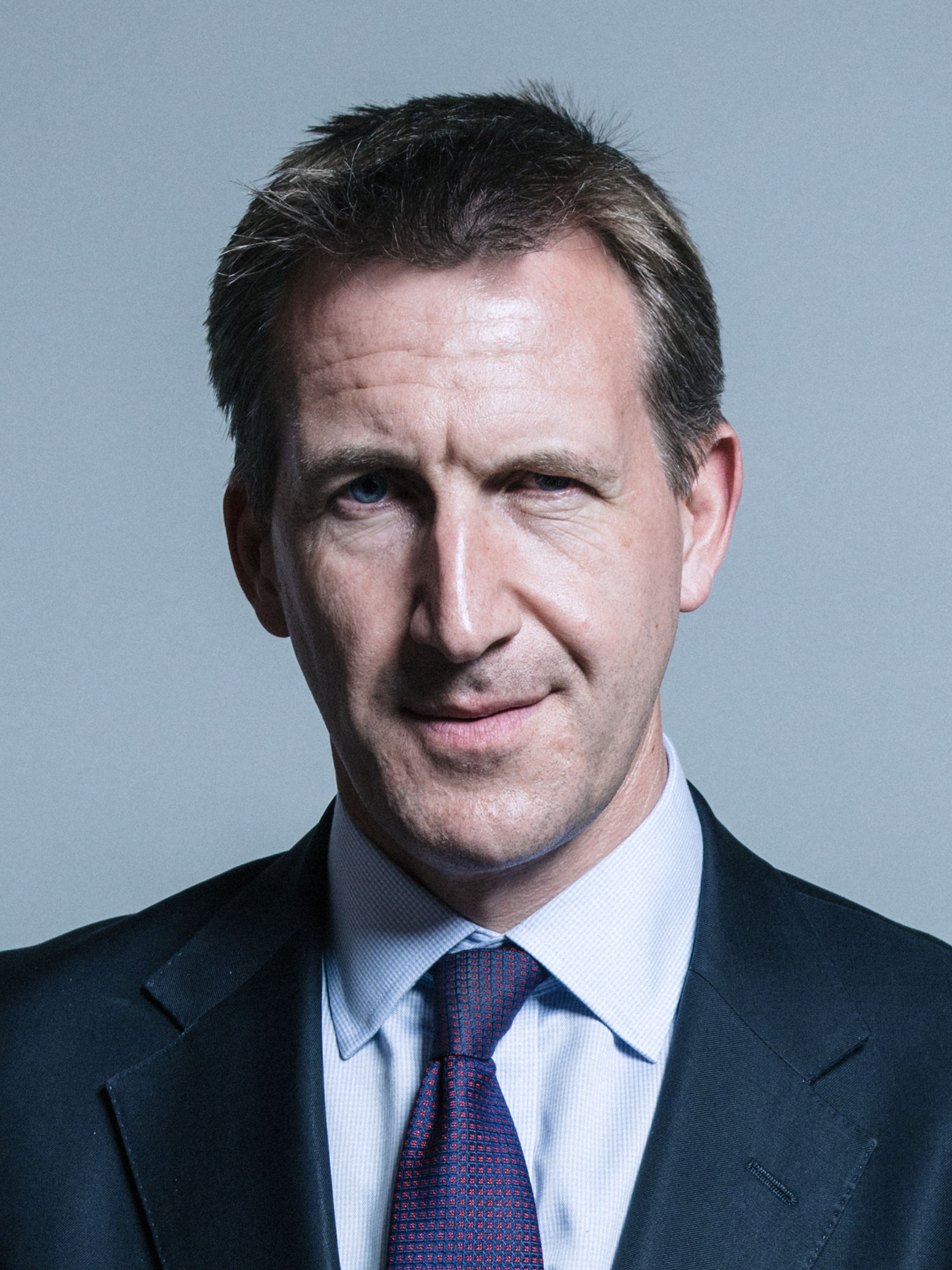

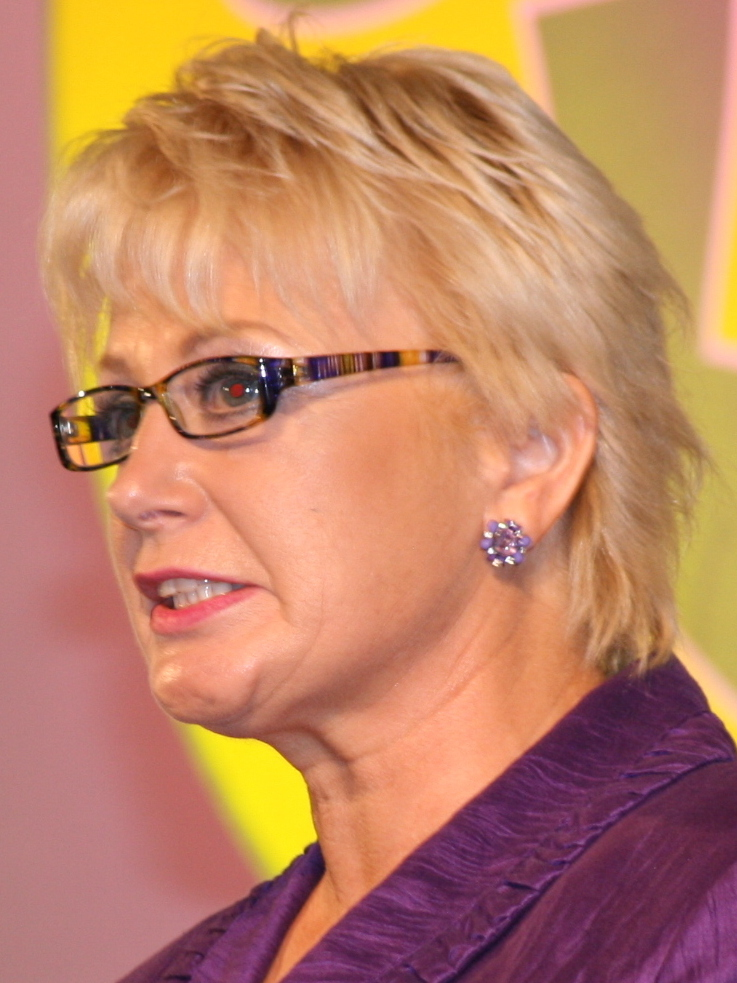
	First party	Second party	Third party
			Con
Candidate	Dan Jarvis	Jane Collins	James Hockney
Party	Labour	UKIP	Conservative
Popular vote	14,724	2,953	1,999
Percentage	60.8%	12.2%	8.3%
Swing	▲13.5 pp	▲7.5 pp	▼9.0 pp
	Fourth party	Fifth party
	BNP	Ind
Candidate	Enis Dalton	Tony Devoy
Party	BNP	Independent
Popular vote	1,463	1,266
Percentage	6.0%	5.2%
Swing	▼2.9 pp	New party
MP before election
Eric Illsley
Labour
Subsequent MP
Dan Jarvis
Labour

A by-election for the United Kingdom parliamentary constituency of Barnsley Central was held on 3 March 2011, caused by the resignation of incumbent Labour Party MP Eric Illsley after he was charged with offences relating to the MPs' expenses scandal. It was won by Dan Jarvis of Labour, who held the seat for the party with an increased majority.

== Background ==
On 19 June 2009, Barnsley Central MP Eric Illsley of the Labour Party was one of dozens of MPs identified by The Daily Telegraph as having made "phantom" claims for council tax on their parliamentary expenses. Illsley claimed over £10,000 for council tax in four years although he was only charged £3,966 for his Band C property in Lambeth in this period. He regularly submitted claims for £200 a month, which meant that he did not have to submit receipts. He was re-elected in the 2010 general election, but shortly after, on 19 May 2010, he was charged with three counts of false accounting. He was subsequently suspended from the Labour Party and continued to sit as an Independent Labour MP.

On 11 January 2011, Illsley pleaded guilty to three charges. Sentencing was postponed for four weeks, during which Illsley remained an MP and therefore continued to receive a Parliamentary salary. A prison sentence of more than 12 months would have meant Illsley being automatically disqualified from Parliament under the provisions of the Representation of the People Act 1981, but a sentence of 12 months or less would not. The Speaker ruled that Illsley's case was sub judice and therefore no motion to expel him from the House of Commons could be debated until after sentencing. Labour leader Ed Miliband and others called on Illsley to resign, and Illsley announced on 12 January 2011 that he would do so. Illsley resigned on 8 February, two days before sentencing. The writ for the by-election was moved the following day, setting polling day as 3 March 2011. On 10 February, Illsley was sentenced to exactly 12 months.

At the 2010 general election, Barnsley Central was Labour's 52nd safest seat, and has, with its predecessor seat of Barnsley been held by the party since 1935. In 2010, the Liberal Democrats and the Conservative Party took second and third places, with only six votes separating them. The British National Party was the only other party to retain its deposit.

== Candidates ==
Barnsley Council confirmed the Statement of Persons Nominated on 16 February.

Labour Party members of the Barnsley Central constituency chose Dan Jarvis as their candidate on 27 January 2011. Jarvis, a Major in the 1st Battalion, The Parachute Regiment who served in Kosovo, Sierra Leone, Iraq and Afghanistan, is the first Labour candidate for this constituency or its predecessor to be born outside Yorkshire since 1938.

On 10 February it was disclosed that Conservative Party leader David Cameron had approached former Yorkshire cricketer Darren Gough, known to be a party supporter, with an invitation to fight the seat. Gough declined due to other commitments but pledged to campaign in the by-election. Later that day 32-year-old businessman James Hockney was announced as the Conservative candidate. Hockney is a South Cambridgeshire councillor who fought the neighbouring Barnsley East constituency in 2010.

The British National Party had declared its intention to stand Enis Dalton as a candidate in the election. The Candidate for the UK Independence Party (UKIP) was Jane Collins, a miner's daughter from Pontefract.

The Liberal Democrats selected journalist Dominic Carman on 12 February. The son of late barrister George Carman, he had fought Barking at the 2010 election and, as a long-time campaigner against the BNP, wrote an unofficial biography of the party's leader, Nick Griffin, which remains unpublished. (On polling day, the London Evening Standard reported that Nick Clegg had not visited the seat at all during the campaign, and was "the first Lib-Dem leader to jettison his candidate in this way since at least 1999".)

Independent candidate Tony Devoy stood in the same constituency at the general election with policies related to living wages and MP salary reductions. He was the Libertas.eu lead candidate at the 2009 European Parliament elections in the East Midlands region. Fellow independent Michael Val Davies campaigned on reforming the tax system, telling the Barnsley Chronicle newspaper that he had 'no chance of winning' the byelection.

== Result ==
Labour retained the seat with a significantly increased majority, while the Liberal Democrats suffered a sharp fall in votes compared to the election 10 months previously. UKIP finished second with nearly one in eight of the votes, while the Conservatives finished third with just over 8% of the votes, and the British National Party's 6% share of the vote saw them finish fourth.

The result was notable for being the first time that UKIP came second in a Westminster election, and for the large drops in vote share by the coalition Government members, the Liberal Democrats' sixth position attracting particular attention. This would set the pattern for many more by-elections during the 2010-2015 parliament; the Liberal Democrats would lose their deposit in 11 of 19 by-elections in Great Britain, while UKIP came second in eight contests, and would ultimately go on to win two by-elections in 2014.

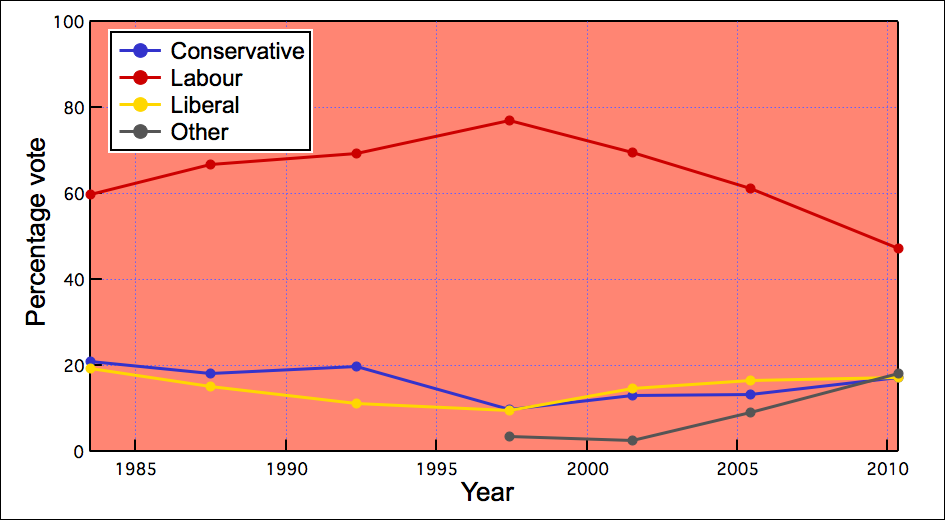
General election results since 1983

Election	Political result	Candidate	Party	Votes	%	±%
Barnsley Central by-election, 2011; Turnout: 24,219 (36.5%) –19.6	Labour hold Majority: 11,771 (48.6%) +18.6; Swing: 13.3% from Lib Dem to Lab	Dan Jarvis	Labour	14,724	60.8	+13.5
Barnsley Central by-election, 2011; Turnout: 24,219 (36.5%) –19.6	Labour hold Majority: 11,771 (48.6%) +18.6; Swing: 13.3% from Lib Dem to Lab	Jane Collins	UKIP	2,953	12.2	+7.5
Barnsley Central by-election, 2011; Turnout: 24,219 (36.5%) –19.6	Labour hold Majority: 11,771 (48.6%) +18.6; Swing: 13.3% from Lib Dem to Lab	James Hockney	Conservative	1,999	8.3	–9.0
Barnsley Central by-election, 2011; Turnout: 24,219 (36.5%) –19.6	Labour hold Majority: 11,771 (48.6%) +18.6; Swing: 13.3% from Lib Dem to Lab	Enis Dalton	BNP	1,463	6.0	–2.9
Barnsley Central by-election, 2011; Turnout: 24,219 (36.5%) –19.6	Labour hold Majority: 11,771 (48.6%) +18.6; Swing: 13.3% from Lib Dem to Lab	Tony Devoy	Independent	1,266	5.2	+3.6
Barnsley Central by-election, 2011; Turnout: 24,219 (36.5%) –19.6	Labour hold Majority: 11,771 (48.6%) +18.6; Swing: 13.3% from Lib Dem to Lab	Dominic Carman	Liberal Democrats	1,012	4.2	–13.1
Barnsley Central by-election, 2011; Turnout: 24,219 (36.5%) –19.6	Labour hold Majority: 11,771 (48.6%) +18.6; Swing: 13.3% from Lib Dem to Lab	Kevin Riddiough	English Democrat	544	2.2	N/A
Barnsley Central by-election, 2011; Turnout: 24,219 (36.5%) –19.6	Labour hold Majority: 11,771 (48.6%) +18.6; Swing: 13.3% from Lib Dem to Lab	Howling Laud Hope	Monster Raving Loony	198	0.8	N/A
Barnsley Central by-election, 2011; Turnout: 24,219 (36.5%) –19.6	Labour hold Majority: 11,771 (48.6%) +18.6; Swing: 13.3% from Lib Dem to Lab	Michael Davies	Independent	60	0.2	N/A
General Election 2010; Turnout: 37,001 (56.5%) +8.8	Labour hold Majority: 11,093 (30.0%) –14.5; Swing: 5.5% from Lab to Lib Dem	Eric Illsley	Labour	17,487	47.3	–10.4
General Election 2010; Turnout: 37,001 (56.5%) +8.8	Labour hold Majority: 11,093 (30.0%) –14.5; Swing: 5.5% from Lab to Lib Dem	Christopher Wiggin	Liberal Democrats	6,394	17.3	+0.7
General Election 2010; Turnout: 37,001 (56.5%) +8.8	Labour hold Majority: 11,093 (30.0%) –14.5; Swing: 5.5% from Lab to Lib Dem	Piers Tempest	Conservative	6,388	17.3	+2.5
General Election 2010; Turnout: 37,001 (56.5%) +8.8	Labour hold Majority: 11,093 (30.0%) –14.5; Swing: 5.5% from Lab to Lib Dem	Ian Sutton	BNP	3,307	8.9	+4.4
General Election 2010; Turnout: 37,001 (56.5%) +8.8	Labour hold Majority: 11,093 (30.0%) –14.5; Swing: 5.5% from Lab to Lib Dem	David Silver	UKIP	1,727	4.7	N/A
General Election 2010; Turnout: 37,001 (56.5%) +8.8	Labour hold Majority: 11,093 (30.0%) –14.5; Swing: 5.5% from Lab to Lib Dem	Donald Wood	Independent	732	2.0	–2.1
General Election 2010; Turnout: 37,001 (56.5%) +8.8	Labour hold Majority: 11,093 (30.0%) –14.5; Swing: 5.5% from Lab to Lib Dem	Tony Devoy	Independent	610	1.6	N/A
General Election 2010; Turnout: 37,001 (56.5%) +8.8	Labour hold Majority: 11,093 (30.0%) –14.5; Swing: 5.5% from Lab to Lib Dem	Terence Robinson	Socialist Labour	356	1.0	N/A

== See also ==
- 1889 Barnsley by-election
- 1897 Barnsley by-election
- 1938 Barnsley by-election
- 1953 Barnsley by-election
- List of United Kingdom by-elections
