= William Compton, 5th Marquess of Northampton =

British politician (1851–1913)

The Most Honourable The Marquess of Northampton KG

Lord Lieutenant of Warwickshire
- In office 7 May 1912 – 15 June 1913
- Monarch: George V
- Preceded by: The Marquess of Hertford
- Succeeded by: Earl of Craven

Member of Parliament for Barnsley
- In office 11 March 1889 – 11 September 1897
- Preceded by: Courtney Kenny
- Succeeded by: Joseph Walton

Member of Parliament for Stratford-on-Avon
- In office 24 November 1885 – 1 July 1886
- Preceded by: New constituency
- Succeeded by: Frederick Townsend

Personal details
- Born: 23 April 1851 Castle Ashby, Northamptonshire
- Died: 15 June 1913 (aged 62) Acqui, Piedmont, Italy
- Party: Liberal
- Spouse: Hon. Mary Florence Baring (m. 1884; died 1902)
- Children: William Compton, 6th Marquess of Northampton
- Parent(s): William Compton, 4th Marquess of Northampton; Eliza Elliot
- Education: Eton College
- Alma mater: Trinity College, Cambridge
- Awards: KG; KGStJ

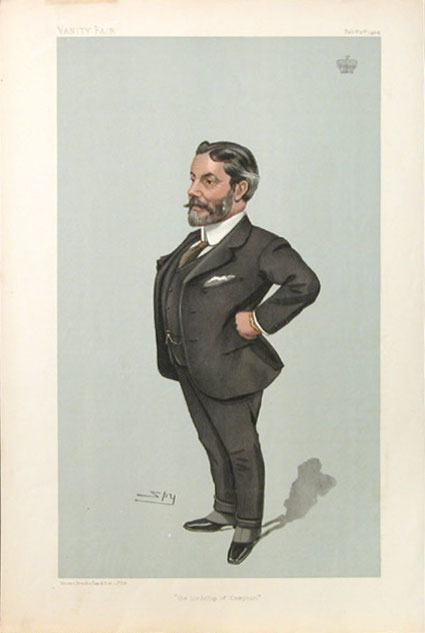
The Marquess of Northampton by Spy

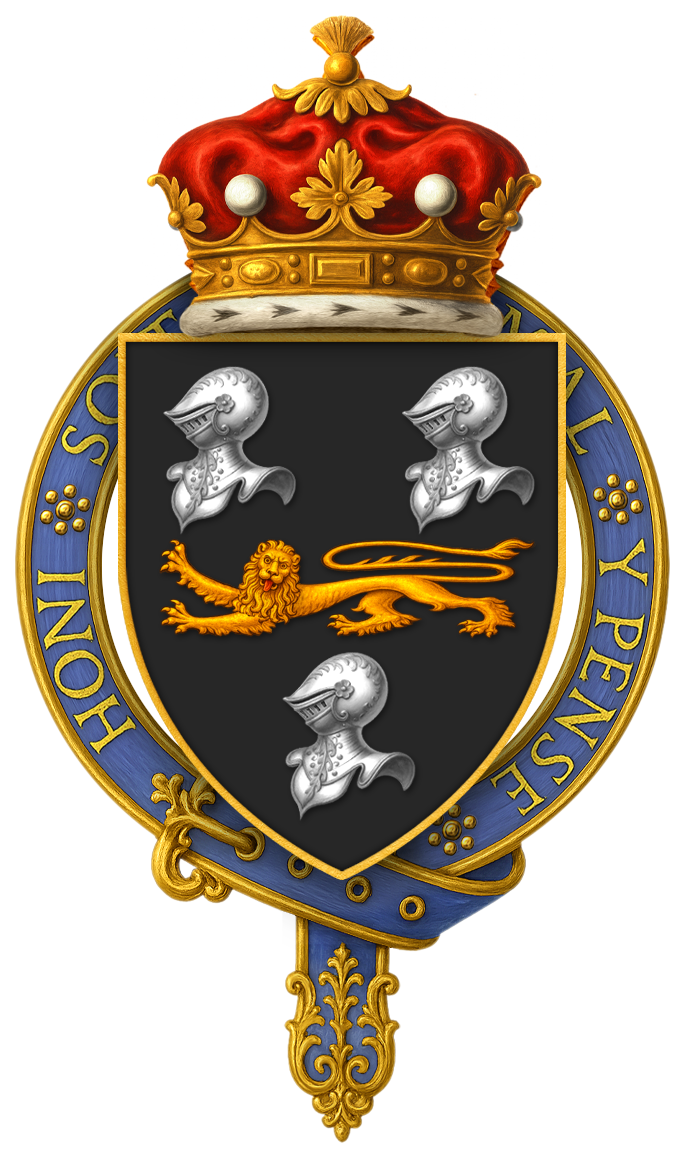
Garter stall plate of the 5th Marquess of Northampton KG, as displayed in St. George's Chapel.

William George Spencer Scott Compton, 5th Marquess of Northampton, KG (23 April 1851 – 15 June 1913), known as Lord William Compton from 1877 to 1887 and as Earl Compton from 1887 to 1897, was a British peer and Liberal politician.

== Early life ==
Northampton was born at Castle Ashby, Northamptonshire, the second son of Admiral the 4th Marquess of Northampton, and his wife Eliza (née Elliot).

His paternal grandparents were Spencer Compton, 2nd Marquess of Northampton and the former Margaret Douglas-Maclean-Clephane. His maternal grandparents were Adm. the Hon. Sir George Elliot (second son of Gilbert Elliot-Murray-Kynynmound, 1st Earl of Minto) and Eliza Cecilia Ness (youngest daughter of James Ness of Osgodby).

He was educated at Eton College and Trinity College, Cambridge, where he graduated as B.A. He received the courtesy title of Earl Compton in 1887 on the death of his elder brother.

== Diplomatic and political career ==
He served in the Diplomatic Service as Second Secretary to the British embassies in Paris, Rome and St Petersburg. He then served as Private Secretary to the Lord Lieutenant of Ireland, the Earl Cowper, between 1880 and 1882, and was elected to the House of Commons for Stratford-on-Avon in December 1885. He held this seat until July the following year and then sat for Barnsley from 1889 to 1897. In the latter year Northampton succeeded his father in the marquessate and entered the House of Lords.

Northampton, who was a major landowner in Clerkenwell and north London, was elected a founder member of London County Council for Finsbury in 1889, then served as County Alderman from 1892 to 1895. He was J.P. for the counties of Warwickshire and Northamptonshire.

Northampton was President of the British and Foreign Bible Society in 1902, and since this was a coronation year he presented the Coronation Bible to King Edward VII. From 1908 he was Honorary Colonel of the London Heavy Brigade of the Royal Garrison Artillery.

He was later Special Envoy to Foreign Courts to announce the accession of King George V in 1910 and served as Lord Lieutenant of Warwickshire from 1912 to 1913. He was appointed a Knight Companion of the Garter in 1908 and was also a Knight of Grace of the Order of St John of Jerusalem.

== Personal life ==
Lord William Compton married, in 1884, the Hon. Mary Florence Baring, daughter and heiress of William Baring, 2nd Baron Ashburton, and his wife, Louisa, Lady Ashburton. They had three children, including:

- William Bingham Compton, 6th Marquess of Northampton (1885–1978), who married Lady Emma Margery Thynne, second daughter of Thomas Thynne, 5th Marquess of Bath in 1921. They divorced in 1942 and he married Virginia Lucie Heaton, third daughter of Capt. David Rimington Heaton in 1942. They divorced in 1958 and he married Elspeth Grace Roper-Curzon (former wife of Christopher Roper-Curzon, 19th Baron Teynham), eldest daughter of William Ingham Whitaker of Pylewell Park, in 1958.
- Lady Margaret Louisa Lizzie Compton (1886–1970), who married Edward Loch, 2nd Baron Loch, in 1905.
- Lt. Lord Spencer Douglas Compton (1893–1915), who died unmarried.

Lady Northampton died at Castle Ashby on 1 June 1902, aged 41, following a long illness from progressive paralysis. Lord Northampton survived her by eleven years and died, suddenly, at Acqui, Piedmont, Italy, in June 1913, aged 62. He was buried at Castle Ashby, and succeeded in his titles by his eldest son, William.

== Sources ==
- Kidd, Charles, Williamson, David (editors). Debrett's Peerage and Baronetage (1990 edition). New York: St Martin's Press, 1990.
- Leigh Rayment's Historical List of MPs

Parliament of the United Kingdom
New constituency	Member of Parliament for Stratford-on-Avon; 1885–1886	Succeeded by Frederick Townsend
Preceded by Courtney Kenny	Member of Parliament for Barnsley; 1889–1897	Succeeded by Joseph Walton
Honorary titles
Preceded by The Marquess of Hertford	Lord Lieutenant of Warwickshire; 1912 – 1913	Succeeded by The Earl of Craven
Peerage of the United Kingdom
Preceded by William Compton	Marquess of Northampton; 2nd creation 1897 – 1913	Succeeded by William Bingham Compton
