= Spencer II of Northampton =

Spencer II of Northampton may refer to:

- Spencer Compton, 2nd Earl of Northampton (1601–1643), English peer, soldier and politician
- Spencer Compton, 2nd Marquess of Northampton (1790–1851), British nobleman and patron of science and the arts
