= Michael Oliver (Lord Mayor of London) =

British politician (born 1940)

Sir Michael Oliver

674th Lord Mayor of London
- In office 2001–2002
- Preceded by: Sir David Howard, Bt
- Succeeded by: Sir Gavyn Arthur

Personal details
- Born: James Michael Yorrick Oliver; 13 July 1940 (age 85)
- Occupation: Politician, businessman

Sir James Michael Yorrick Oliver (born 13 July 1940) is a retired investment banker who was Lord Mayor of London for 2001–2002.

Educated at Wellington College, he started his working life in Stockbrokers Kitcat & Aitken and became a member of the London Stock Exchange. He subsequently became both a partner of the firm and later managing director. City mergers in the 1990s saw him become Director, Lloyds Investment Managers and then Director, Investment Funds at Hill Samuel Asset Management. In July 2000, following the Lloyds TSB merger with Scottish Widows, he became Director, Investment Funds with Scottish Widows Investment Partnership. Sir Michael has also served on the Boards of a number of investment trusts and country funds. He is a fellow of the Securities Institute.

Parallel to his business success he has also been a Magistrate, a Liveryman (Past Master of the Worshipful Company of Ironmongers), and an Alderman. He was an Sheriff in 1997 and elected Lord Mayor in 2001.

Sir Michael is married to Sally and has two children, Sophie and Justine, and four grandchildren. His interests include travel and archaeology.

Civic offices
Preceded by Sir David Howard, Bt	Lord Mayor of London; 2001–2002	Succeeded by Sir Gavyn Arthur
