= Warner baronets of Brettenham (1910) =

Escutcheon of the Warner baronets of Brettenham

The Warner baronetcy, of Brettenham in the County of Suffolk, was created in the Baronetage of the United Kingdom on 9 July 1910 for Courtenay Warner, Member of Parliament for North Somerset and Lichfield. The 2nd Baronet was High Sheriff of Suffolk between 1947 and 1948 and a Colonel in the British Army, awarded an MC in 1915 and a DSO in 1917.

== Warner baronets, of Brettenham (1910) ==
- Sir (Thomas) Courtenay Theydon Warner, 1st Baronet (1857–1934)
- Sir Edward Courtenay Thomas Warner, 2nd Baronet (1886–1955)
- Sir (Edward Courtenay) Henry Warner, 3rd Baronet (1922–2011)
- Sir Philip Courtenay Thomas Warner, 4th Baronet (born 1951)

The heir apparent is Charles Thomas Courtenay Warner (born 1989).

== Notes ==
Baronetage of the United Kingdom
Preceded by Mond baronets	Warner baronets of Brettenham; 9 July 1910	Succeeded by Walton baronets
