= Clive Martin =

British businessman and Lord Mayor of London

Sir Clive Haydn Martin (born 20 March 1935) is a British businessman who was Lord Mayor of London from 1999 to 2000.

Martin was born in London to Thomas Stanley and Dorothy Gladys Martin. He was educated at St Albans School, Hertfordshire, Haileybury and the London College of Printing. He completed National Service in the Royal Engineers, was commissioned and appointed OBE. He served in and commanded the Honourable Artillery Company earning the Territorial Decoration, and was appointed in 1999 Honorary Colonel of 135 Independent Topographic Squadron RE (Volunteers). In 1985, Martin was elected as Alderman to the City of London, and served as Sheriff of the City of London in 1996 and Lord Mayor of London for 1999–2000. He has also served as Vice-Chair of the City of London Magistrates Court.

Martin is an active English Freemason, who served from 2006 to 2007 in the very senior post of Junior Grand Warden of the United Grand Lodge of England. He was initiated in 'British Lodge' No 8 in 1984 and served as Master in the 'Lodge of Assistance' No 2773.

He was Chairman of MPG Ltd., a graphics communications business. In 2009, he was given an honorary doctorate by the University of the Arts London, and is listed as an alumnus of the London College of Communication.

Civic offices
Preceded by Peter Levene, Baron Levene of Portsoken	Lord Mayor of London; 1999–2000	Succeeded by Sir David Howard, 3rd Baronet
