= Courtney Kenny (British politician) =

British jurist, academic and politician (1847–1930)

Courtney Stanhope Kenny JP, LLD, FBA
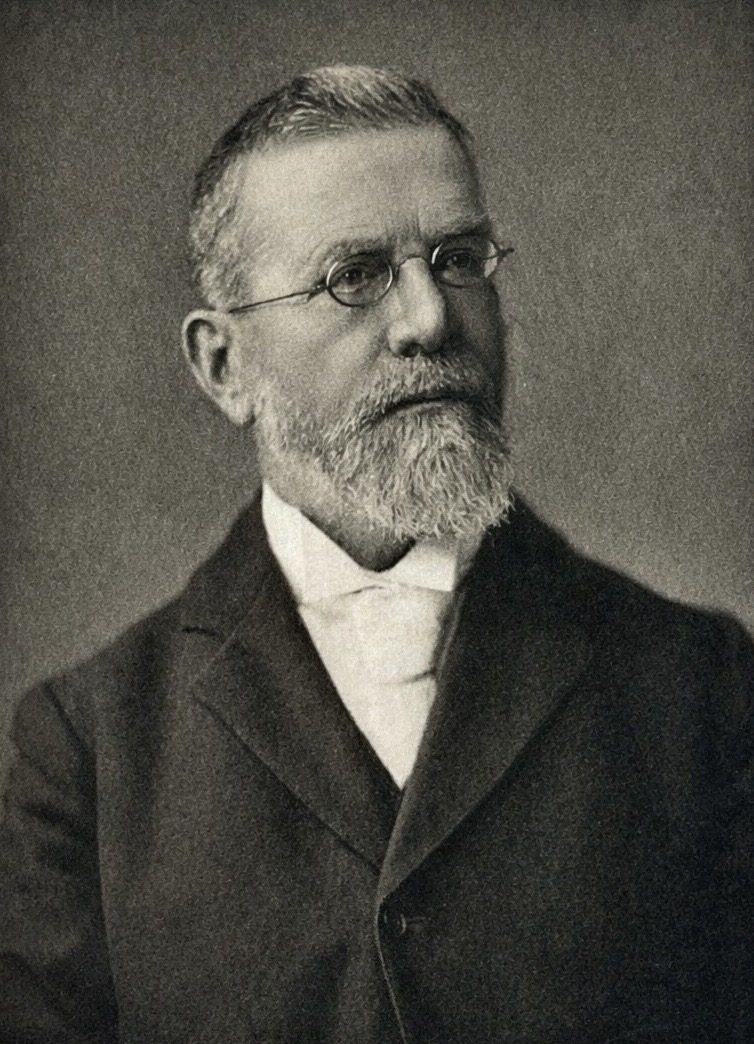

Downing Professor of the Laws of England
- In office 1907–1918
- Preceded by: Frederick William Maitland
- Succeeded by: Harold Dexter Hazeltine

University of Cambridge Reader in English Law
- In office 1888–1907

Member of Parliament for Barnsley
- In office 1885–1888
- Prime Minister: William Gladstone
- Succeeded by: William Compton

Personal details
- Born: 18 March 1847
- Died: 18 March 1930 (aged 83) Cambridge, England
- Resting place: Parish of Ascension Burial Ground
- Party: Liberal Party
- Spouse: Emily Gertrude Wiseman (m. 1876)
- Children: 2 daughters
- Education: Downing College, Cambridge

Professor Courtney Stanhope Kenny, JP, LLD, FBA (18 March 1847 – 18 March 1930) was a British jurist, academic and Liberal politician. He sat in the House of Commons from 1885 to 1888, and was later Downing Professor of the Laws of England at Downing College, University of Cambridge. He is buried with his family in the Parish of the Ascension Burial Ground in Cambridge.

== Early life and career ==
Kenny was born on the Wirral, the son of William Fenton Kenny J.P. of Halifax and Ripon and his wife Agnes Ralph, daughter of John Rhodes Ralph J.P. of Halifax. He was educated at the Heath and Hipperholme grammar schools and joined a firm of solicitors in 1863. In 1869 he became a partner but decided to leave and pursue a university education, entering Downing College, Cambridge in 1871. His career at university was particularly brilliant; in 1872 he was awarded a scholarship, in 1874 he was senior in the law and history tripos, won the Winchester Reading Prize, and was elected president of the union. In 1875, he won the chancellor's medal for legal studies.

Kenny was elected a fellow of Downing College in 1875 and was appointed to a lecturership in law and moral science. In three successive years, 1877, 1878, 1879, he submitted an essay which won him thrice the Yorke Prize; the essays were on the history of the law of primogeniture (jointly with Perceval Maitland Laurence), the law relating to married women's property, and the law of charities.

In 1881 Kenny was called to the bar at Lincoln's Inn and joined the south-eastern circuit.

== Political career ==
At the 1885 general election Kenny was elected member of parliament (MP) for the Barnsley division of Yorkshire, and at the general election of June 1886 he was again returned as a Liberal. While in parliament he introduced bills for the abolition of primogeniture and for the amendment of the law relating to blasphemy, which demanded the repeal of the laws restricting the expression of religious opinion.

== Cambridge Professor ==
In 1888 Kenny became university reader of English law at Cambridge University, and resigned from parliament to concentrate on work at the university. In 1907 he was elected to replace the recently deceased Frederic William Maitland as Downing Professor of the Laws of England, a position he held until his retirement in 1918. He died in Cambridge aged 83.

== Selected bibliography ==
- Outlines of Criminal Law, 1902, textbook with 12 further editions by Kenny to 1929 and further editions to 1966,
  - including, with James H. Webb, an American edition in 1907
- The Law of England on the Effects of Marriage on Property, Yorke Prize 1877
- The History of the Law of Primogeniture, Yorke Prize 1878
- The true principles of legislation with regard to property given for charitable or other public uses or Endowed Charities, Yorke Prize 1879?1880
- A Selection of Cases Illustrative of English Criminal Law, 1901
- A selection of cases illustrative of the English law of tort, 1908

== Family ==
Kenny married Emily Gertrude Wiseman (2 July 1849 – 27 November 1929) daughter of William Wood Wiseman M.R.C.S. of Ossett, Yorkshire in 1876. They had two daughters, Gertrude (died 9 September 1958) and Agnes (died 11 January 1966); all are buried together in the Parish of the Ascension Burial Ground in Cambridge.

== Tributes and memorials ==
Past and present members of Downing College commissioned a portrait of Kenny by the artist Edward Clegg Wilkinson in 1909. Presented to the college in 1910, it now hangs in the Dining Hall.

A Festschrift volume titled Cambridge Legal Essays: Written in Honour of and Presented to Doctor Bond, Professor Buckland and Professor Kenny was published in 1926. It contains essays by leading legal scholars of the time and includes biographical notes (with portrait plates) on Henry Bond, W. W. Buckland, and Courtney Stanhope Kenny. The volume was edited by Percy H. Winfield and Arnold D. McNair and comprises contributions on various legal topics in English law.

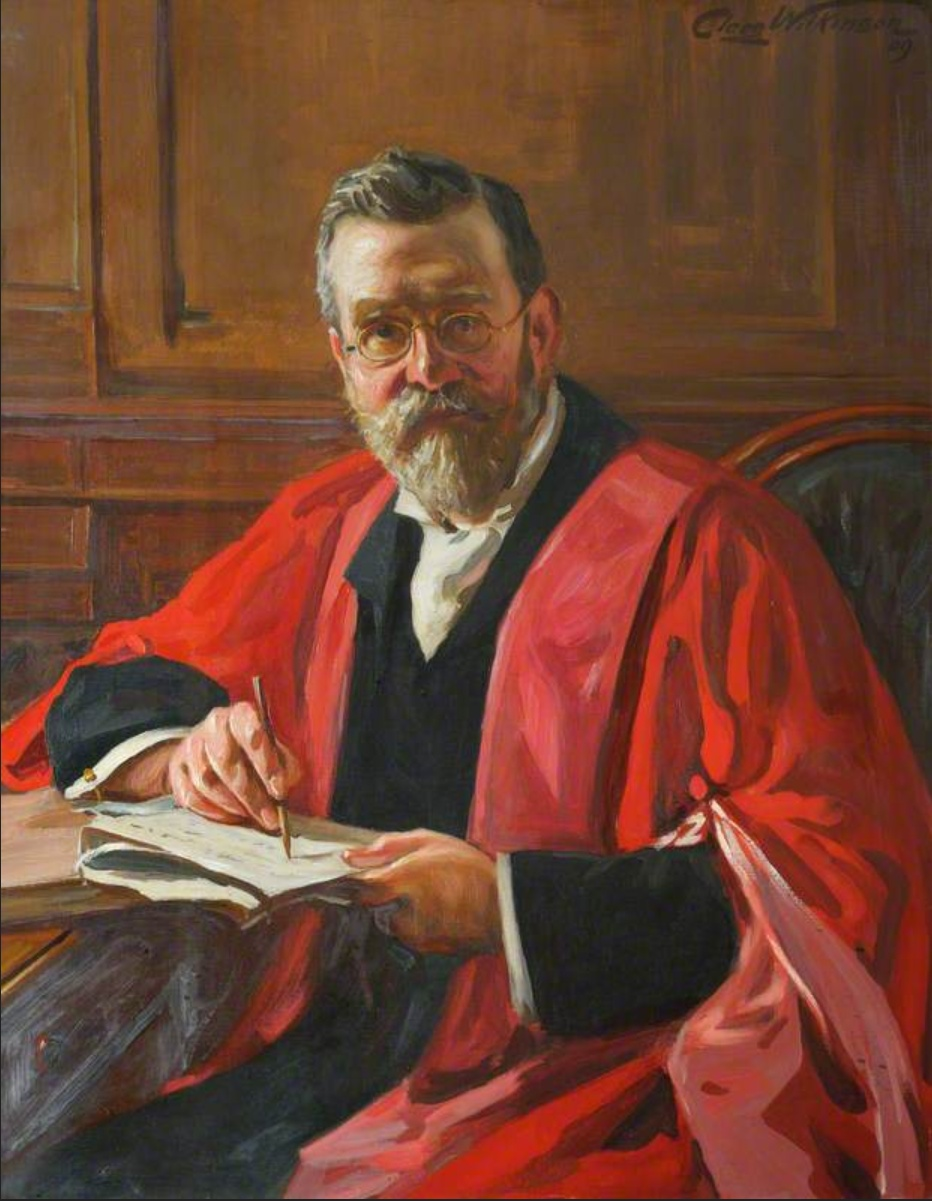
Courtney Stanhope Kenny, 1909, by Edward Clegg Wilkinson

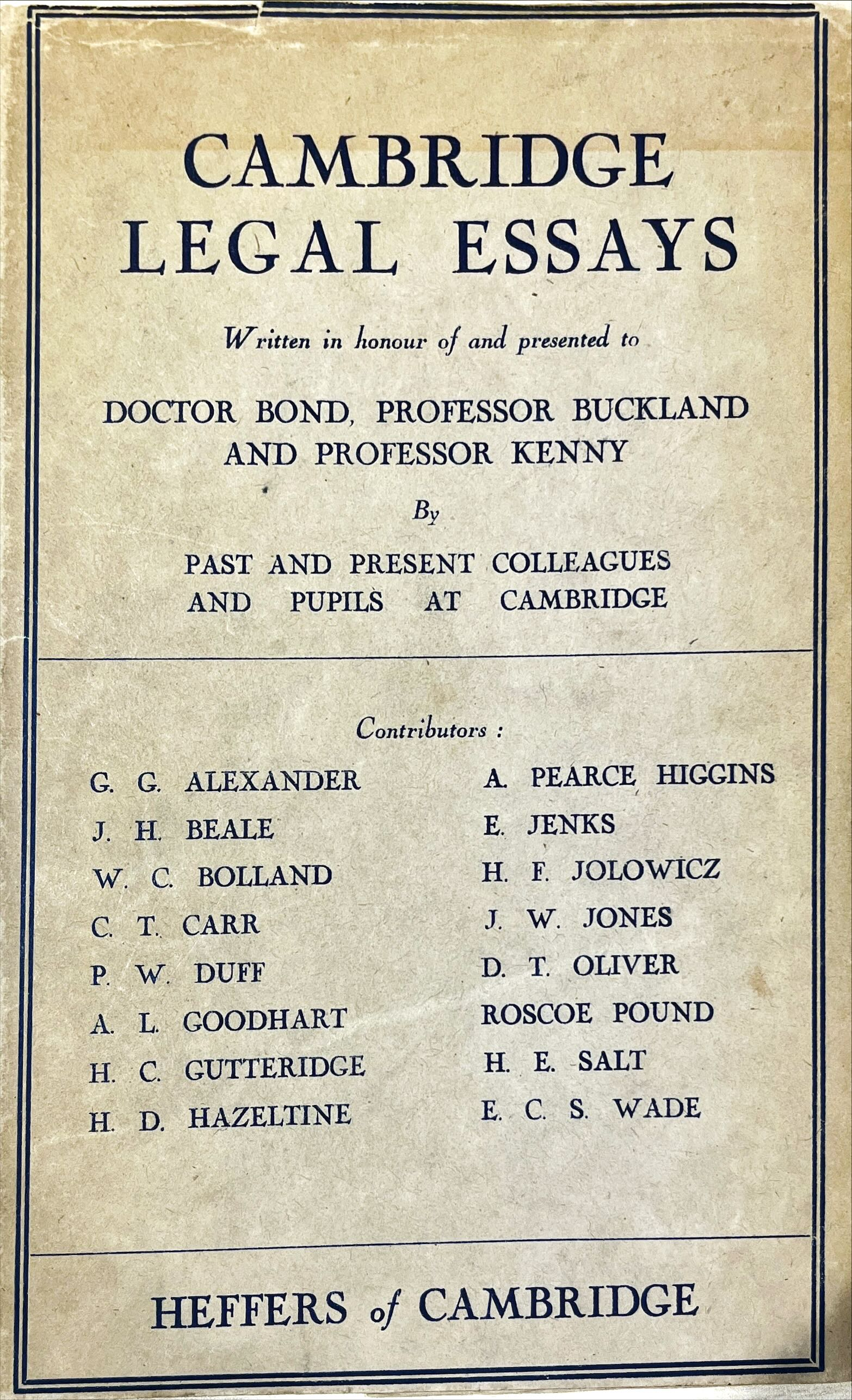
Cover of Cambridge Legal Essays, 1926

The Kenny Gate in Downing College on Tennis Court Road was funded by Muriel and Agnes Kenny in memory of their father after his death in 1930. Later, in the late 1950s and early 1960s, the sisters became the college's first significant female benefactors by giving further funds to construct two residential blocks, Kenny A and Kenny B, beyond the west end of the Baker Buildings. Completed in 1959 and 1961, these new student accommodations met an urgent housing need and were also dedicated to their father.

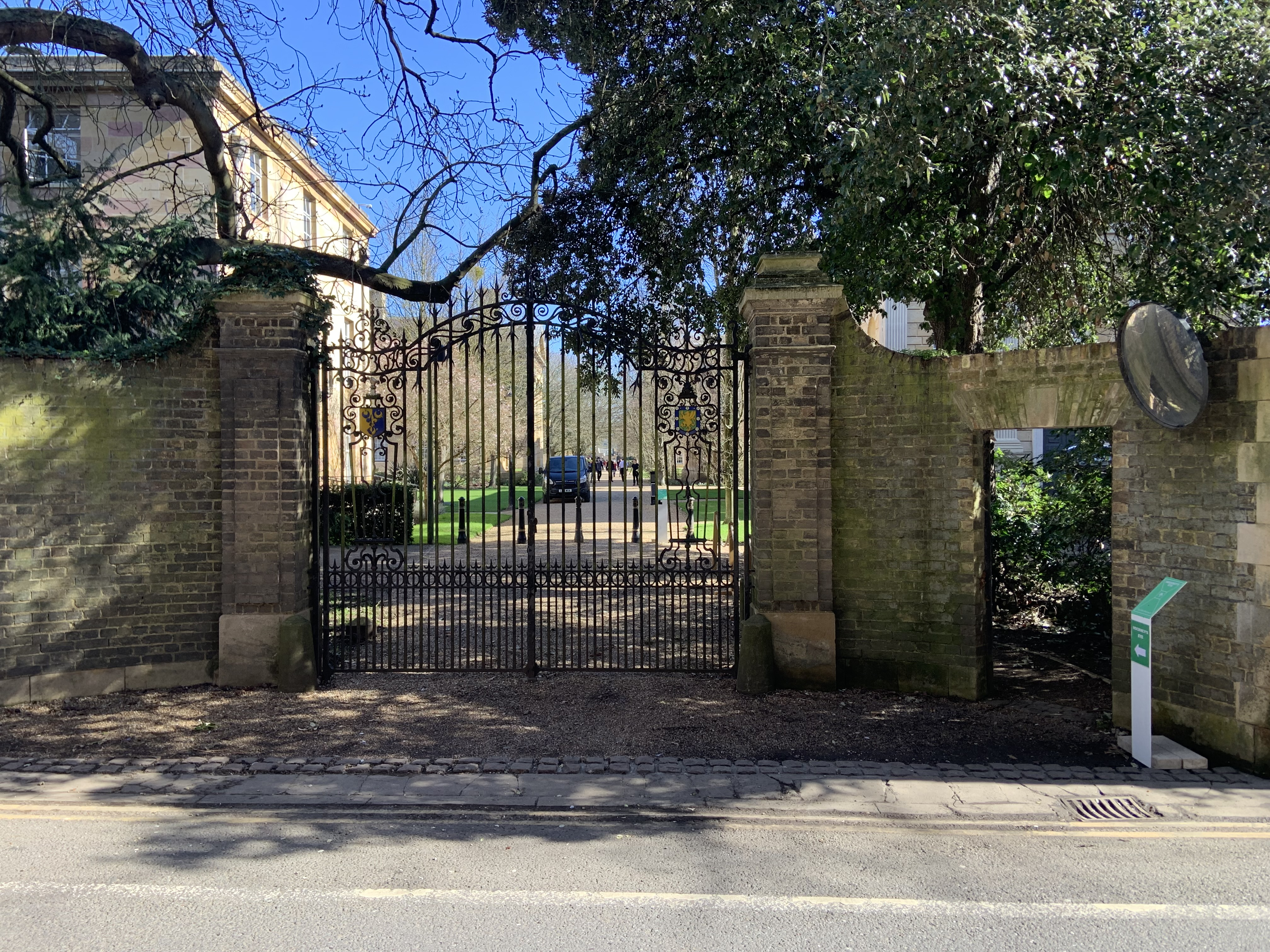
Kenny Gate entrance to Downing College

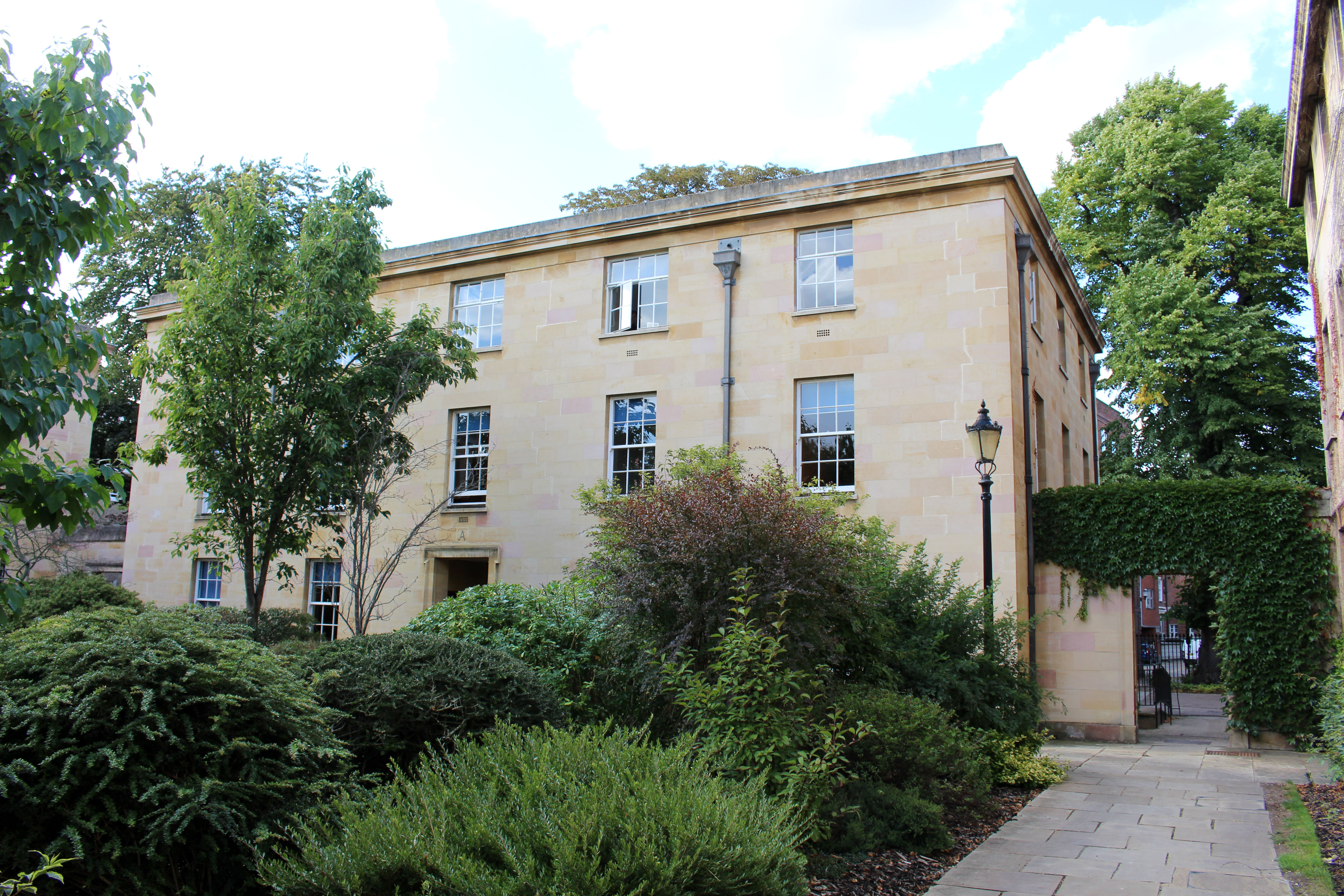
Kenny Building A

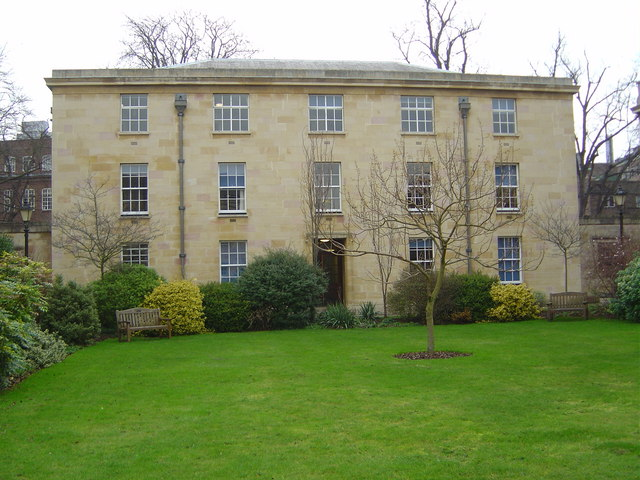
Kenny Building B

Parliament of the United Kingdom
New constituency	Member of Parliament for Barnsley; 1885–1888	Succeeded by Earl Compton
