= 1938 Barnsley by-election =

UK parliamentary by-election

The 1938 Barnsley by-election was a by-election held on 16 June 1938 for the British House of Commons constituency of Barnsley in what was then the West Riding of Yorkshire.

The seat had become vacant on the death in April 1938 of the Labour Member of Parliament (MP) John Samuel Potts, who had represented the constituency since the 1935 general election, having previously been Barnsley's MP from 1922 to 1931.

== Result ==
The Labour candidate, Frank Collindridge, held the seat for his party with an increased majority;

Barnsley by-election, 1938
Party	Candidate	Votes	%	±%
Labour	Frank Collindridge	23,566	64.4	+5.5
Liberal National	Seymour Howard	13,052	35.6	−5.5
Majority		10,514	28.8	+11.0
Turnout		36,618	72.7	−9.9
Labour hold		Swing	+5.5	

== See also ==
- Barnsley (UK Parliament constituency)
- 1897 Barnsley by-election
- 1953 Barnsley by-election
- 2011 Barnsley Central by-election
- List of United Kingdom by-elections
