= Monkwell Square =

Garden square in the City of London

Coordinates: 51.5177°N 0.09396°W

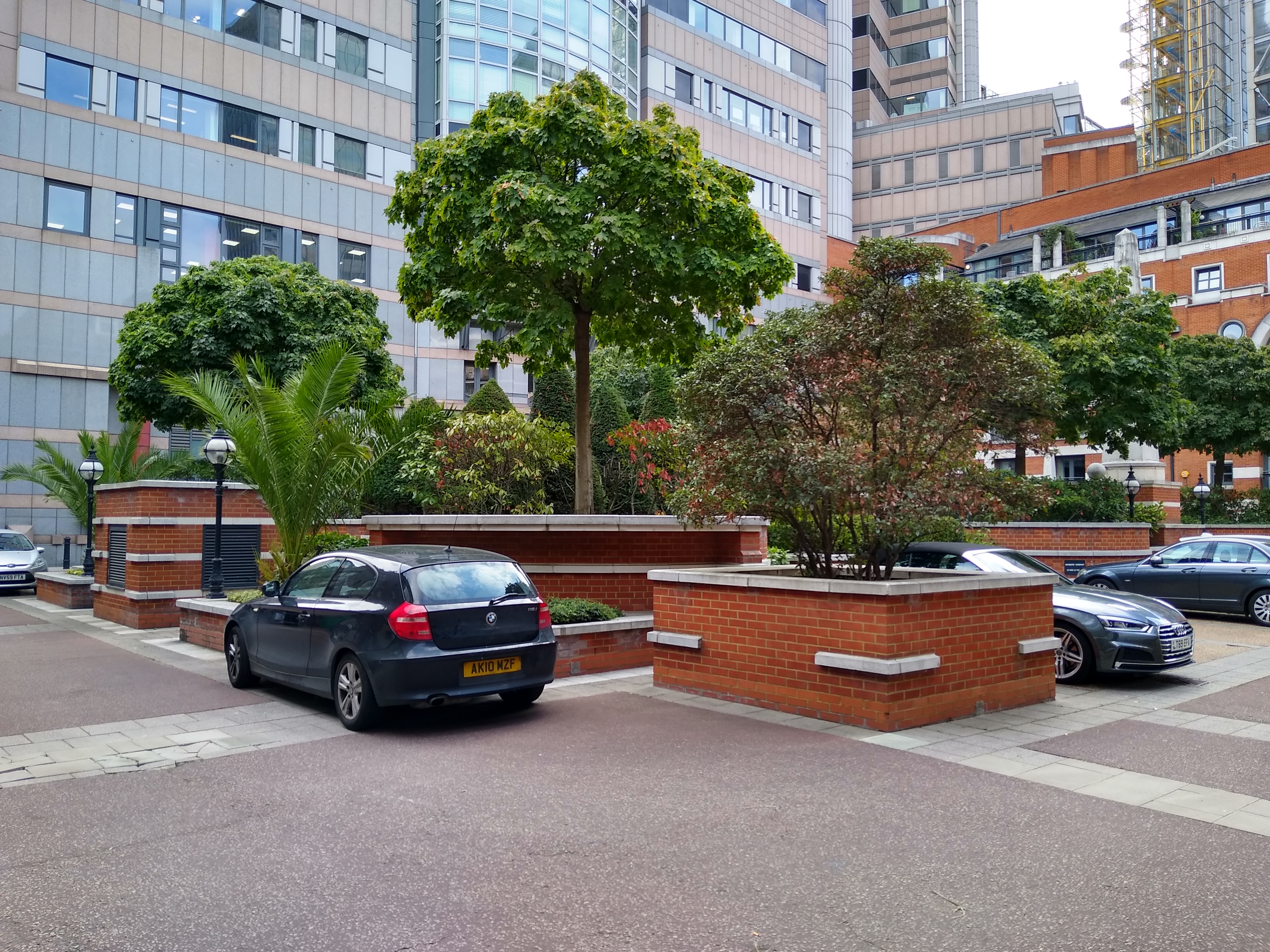
Monkwell Square

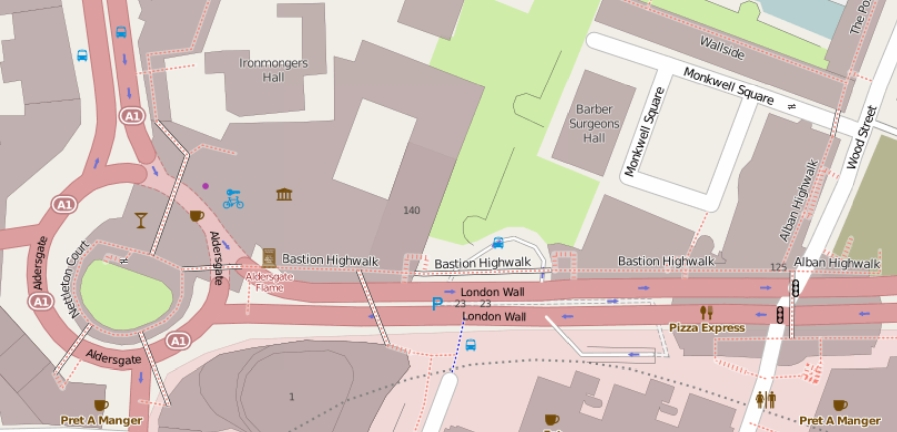
The immediate vicinity of Monkwell Square

Monkwell Square is a London street and garden square. It forms part of the Barbican estate, and lies to the west of Wood Street.

The Worshipful Company of Barbers owns Barber-Surgeons' Hall, which was established in Monkwell Street in the 14th century. The Hall survived the Great Fire, but was destroyed by enemy bombing in the London Blitz in the Second World War. The modern hall was rebuilt approximately 10m to the east of the former site, in Monkwell Square by architect Terry Farrell.

== Notable residents ==
- Sir David Howarth Seymour Howard, 3rd Baronet, businessman and public official
