= Sidney Schofield =

British politician

Sidney Schofield (22 March 1911 – 4 December 1992) was a Labour Party politician in the United Kingdom who served as a member of parliament (MP) for little over a year.

Born in Pontefract, Schofield was elected MP for Barnsley at the 1951 general election. The incumbent, Frank Collindridge, had died during the campaign for that election, and Schofield was selected as the Labour candidate in his place with a 28,227 majority; polling day was delayed to 8 November.

Schofield resigned his seat less than two years later, on 21 January 1953, "because he did not like Westminster". and at the resulting by-election on 31 March, the future cabinet minister Roy Mason was elected as his replacement, who in contrast served 34 years representing Barnsley. Schofield died in Barnsley in 1992 aged 81.

Parliament of the United Kingdom
Preceded by Frank Collindridge	Member of Parliament for Barnsley; 1951–1953	Succeeded by Roy Mason
Trade union offices
Preceded by Fred Collindridge	General Secretary of the Yorkshire Area of the National Union of Mineworkers; 1964–1973	Succeeded by Owen Briscoe
Preceded by Sam Bullough	Vice President of the National Union of Mineworkers; 1969–1972	Succeeded by Mick McGahey
