= Charles Douglas-Compton, 3rd Marquess of Northampton =

British peer

Charles Douglas-Compton, 3rd Marquess of Northampton, DL (26 May 1816 – 3 March 1877), styled Earl Compton from birth until 1851, was a British peer.

== Early life ==
Born Charles Compton at Parliament Street, London, he was the son of Spencer Compton, 2nd Marquess of Northampton and his wife Margaret, eldest daughter of William Douglas-Maclean-Clephane. In 1831, a year after the death of his mother, he assumed the additional surname Douglas by sign manual. Douglas-Compton succeeded his father as marquess in 1851.

He was educated at Trinity College, Cambridge, where he graduated with a Master of Arts in 1837. In 1850, he received an Honorary Doctorate of Civil Law from the University of Oxford.

== Career ==
Douglas-Compton was appointed a deputy lieutenant for Argyllshire in 1841. He was a trustee of the National Gallery (London). Douglas-Compton inherited Compton Wynyates in Warwickshire and in 1867 he assigned Sir Matthew Digby Wyatt to restore it.

== Personal life ==
In 1859, he married Theodosia, daughter of Henry Vyner and granddaughter of Robert Vyner, MP for Lincolnshire. Their marriage was childless and Douglas-Compton was succeeded in his titles by his younger brother William.

He married secondly Hon. Mary Noel (d. 1719), daughter of Baptist Noel, 3rd Viscount Campden (1611 – 29 October 1682) and his third wife Hester Wotton, a daughter of Thomas Wotton, 2nd Baron Wotton

== Coat of arms ==
Coat of arms of Charles Douglas-Compton, 3rd Marquess of Northampton
Coronet A coronet of an Marquess Crest 1st, on a mount a beacon fired proper, behind it a ribbon inscribed with the words, Nisi Dominus (Compton); 2nd, a sanglier, sticking betwixt two clefts of an oak tree, with a chain and lock holding them, all proper, in a scroll above, Lock sicker (Douglas). Escutcheon Quarterly, 1st and 4th sable, a lion passant guardant or, between three esquires' helmets argent (Compton); 2nd and 3rd quarterly, 1st and 4th argent, a man's heart gules, ensigned with an Imperial crown proper, and on a chief azure, three stars of the first; 2nd and 3rd argent, three piles issuing from a chief gules, on the last two stars of the first, all within a bordure azure, charged with eight buckles or (Douglas). Supporters Dexter, a dragon ermine, ducally gorged and chained or; Sinister, an unicorn argent, horned, maned, hoofed, and tufted sable. Motto Je ne serche qu'un. I seek but one.

Peerage of the United Kingdom
Preceded by Spencer Compton	Marquess of Northampton; 2nd creation 1851 – 1877	Succeeded by William Compton
