= Sir Joseph Walton, 1st Baronet =

British politician (1849–1923)

Sir Joseph Walton in 1911

Sir Joseph Walton, 1st Baronet, DL, JP (19 March 1849 – 8 February 1923) was an English coalowner and Liberal Party politician.

== Family and education ==
Walton was born at Bollihope, County Durham, the second son of John Walton from Frosterley, a colliery owner. He did not attend school and received his education privately. In 1880 he married Faith Gill the daughter of a Middlesbrough solicitor. They had a son, Joe, who was a barrister and died, unmarried, of erysipelas in 1913 and two daughters. Their home was at Saltburn-by-the-Sea in Cleveland. In religion, Walton was an active Wesleyan Methodist all his life.

== Career ==
Walton began his commercial career in Middlesbrough in 1870 in the coal industry and allied trades. He recognised the great expansion in the coal industry which was continuing to take place at that time and the key place of Middlesbrough in its development. He eventually built up a large business of coal and coke related merchants and colliery ownership.

== Politics ==
=== Doncaster ===
Walton's success in business enabled him to devote his time to political activity. He first contested the Doncaster Division in the West Riding of Yorkshire at the 1895 general election. Doncaster was a Liberal seat but the national mood was swinging to the Conservatives and Walton could not hold the constituency for the Liberals against the trend.

=== Barnsley, by-election ===
Walton soon got another opportunity to enter the House of Commons when a vacancy occurred at another West Riding seat, Barnsley in 1897. The sitting Liberal MP, William Compton who held the courtesy title of Earl Compton, succeeded to the marquessate on the death in September 1897 of his father. Walton was adopted as the Liberal candidate for the resulting by-election. Despite the unanticipated intervention of an Independent Labour Party candidate, Pete Curran, the chief organizer of the Gasworkers and General Labourers’ Union, who was expected to receive the votes of the mineworking districts of Hemsworth and Kinsley as well as those of other working men, Walton retained the seat for the Liberals with a majority of 3,290 over the Unionist Mr J Blyth, with Curran in last place.

=== 1900–1922 ===
Walton held his seat at the 1900 general election in a straight fight against the Unionists by a majority of 3,193. In 1906 he was returned unopposed. He was held again in January 1910 by a majority of 7,372 over the Unionists and was again unopposed at the December 1910 general election. It was clear that by this time Walton had the respect of the working-class community and in 1914 even the Barnsley Trades Council was able to announce that Walton was ‘not a bad representative’. At the 1918 general election, Walton stood again, this time as a Coalition Liberal (having presumably received the Coalition coupon) and was again without opposition.

He did not stand for re-election at the 1922 general election when the seat was won for the first time by the Labour Party.

=== Political stance ===
Walton was described as being in the Radical tradition of late 19th century Liberalism. He was in favour of Irish Home Rule and of other forms of devolution, or ‘Home Rule All Round’. Whilst an MP he voted in favour of the 1908 Women's Enfranchisement Bill. He also took a deep interest in foreign affairs and in the development of the British Empire. He travelled extensively in India, Burma, Africa, America, Canada, Australia, New Zealand, various British Protectorates, as well as visiting China, Japan, Persia, Mesopotamia, Russia and the Balkans. As a result of his interest in the Far East, Walton gained the soubriquet "The Member for China" in Parliament. He was also a Fellow of the Royal Geographical Society and a founder member of the Royal Central Asian Society.

== Honours and appointments ==
Walton was created a baronet, of Rushpool, in the County of York, on 11 July 1910. He was a Justice of the Peace for Middlesbrough and the North Riding of Yorkshire and a Deputy Lieutenant of the North Riding.

== Publication ==
China and the Present Crisis (with notes on a visit to Japan and Korea); Sampson, Low & Co., London, 1900

== Death ==
Walton died at Bournemouth on 8 February 1923 aged 73 years.

Parliament of the United Kingdom
Preceded by Earl Compton	Member of Parliament for Barnsley; 1897 – 1922	Succeeded by John Potts
Baronetage of the United Kingdom
New creation	Baronet (of Rushpool); 1910 – 1923	Extinct
Preceded by Warner baronets	Walton baronets of Brettenham; 11 July 1910	Succeeded by Briscoe baronets
