= Sir Edward Howard, 2nd Baronet =

English businessman and public official

Sir Hamilton Edward de Coucey Howard, 2nd Baronet (19 October 1915 – 16 March 2001), known as Sir Edward Howard, was an English businessman and public official who was Lord Mayor of London. He served as an Alderman of the City of London. Subsequently, he held the position of Sheriff of the City of London in 1966, and later served as the Lord Mayor of London from 1971 to 1972.

== Biography ==
=== Early life ===
Hamilton Edward de Coucey Howard was born on 19 October 1915. His father was Sir Seymour Howard, 1st Baronet (1886–1967) and his mother, Edith Maud Turner. He attended Institut Le Rosey, a boarding school near Rolle, Switzerland, and graduated from Radley College, a boarding school in Radley, Oxfordshire, and from Worcester College, Oxford. He served in the Royal Air Force Volunteer Reserve during the Second World War.

=== Business career ===
He worked as a stockbroker at the London Stock Exchange. An entrepreneur, he purchased Eucryl, a small company from Southampton which made tooth powder and turned it into a successful company. From 1971 to 1982, he served as Chairman of the London Rubber Company, later known as SSL International. Later, he served as Senior Partner and Chairman of Charles Stanley Group (LSE: CAY), and Chairman of the Advanced Electronics Company Limited.

=== Public service ===
He served as an Alderman of the City of London. He then served as Sheriff of the City of London in 1966, and as Lord Mayor of London from 1971 to 1972. He also served as Lieutenant of the City of London from 1976 to 1990.

He became the 2nd Howard baronets of Great Rissington in 1967. He was appointed a Knight of the Most Venerable Order of the Hospital of St. John of Jerusalem (KStJ) in February 1972, and became Knight Grand Cross of the Order of the British Empire later the same year. He was also made a Grand Officer in the Order of Orange-Nassau during the State Visit of Queen Juliana of the Netherlands in April 1972.

=== Personal life ===
He married Elizabeth Howarth Ludlow on 10 July 1943. They had two sons:

- Sir David Howarth Seymour Howard, 3rd Baronet (born 1945).
- John Ludlow Seymour Howard (born 1948).

They resided in the North Downs. He did not drink alcohol, and he enjoyed gardening. He died on 16 March 2001.

Honorary titles
Preceded by Sir Peter Studd	Lord Mayor of London; 1971–1972	Succeeded by The Lord Mais
Baronetage of the United Kingdom
Preceded by Seymour Howard	Baronet (of Great Rissington); 1967–2001	Succeeded by David Howard
