= Richard John Soper =

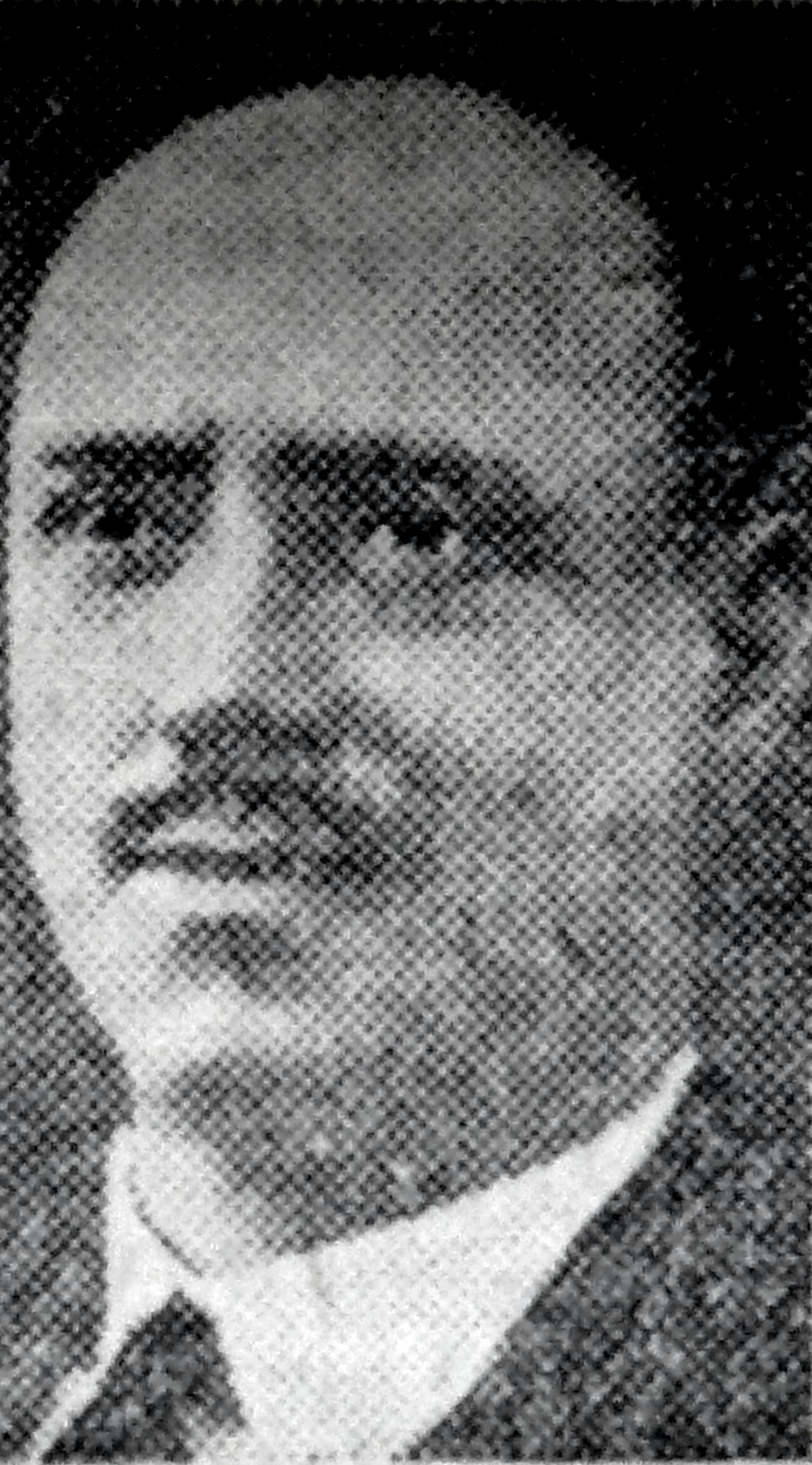
Richard John Soper, 1929

Richard John Soper (13 June 1878 – 23 January 1954) was a Liberal National politician in the United Kingdom who served as member of parliament (MP) for four years between 1931 and 1935.

== Background ==
He was born in Bishop Auckland, Durham, before moving to Barnsley. In 1908 he founded his own timber merchants company, RJ Soper, Ltd.

== Local Politics ==
Soper was active in civic life in Barnsley. In 1924 he was elected as a Barnsley Town Councillor. He served as Mayor of Barnsley for 1930–31. In 1933 he was made an Alderman of the Town council.

== National Politics ==
Soper was elected as the MP for Barnsley at the 1931 general election, and held the seat until the 1935 general election. When the Liberal Party split at the 1931 general election over Ramsay MacDonald's formation of a National Government, he supported the faction led by Sir John Simon, who had reached an electoral arrangement with the Conservative Party. This meant that in Barnsley, where the Conservatives had finished in third place in 1929, they withdrew to enable Soper, a straight fight against the sitting Labour MP, John Potts.

Soper's parliamentary career ended when Potts re-gained the seat for Labour at the 1935 general election. When Potts died, a by-election took place in Barnsley in 1938, but Soper did not contest the seat.

Soper's son, also called Richard John Soper, was also involved in politics. He was the Liberal Party candidate for Coventry South at the 1950 general election, but was not elected.

Parliament of the United Kingdom
Preceded by John Potts	Member of Parliament for Barnsley; 1931–1935	Succeeded by John Potts
