= Barnsley (constituency) =

Parliamentary constituency in the United Kingdom, 1885–1983

- Former county constituency for the House of Commons
- County: South Yorkshire

1885–1983
- Seats: One
- Created from: Southern West Riding of Yorkshire
- Replaced by: Barnsley Central, Barnsley East and Barnsley West & Penistone
- During its existence contributed to new seat(s) of: Hemsworth; Wentworth

Barnsley was a Parliamentary constituency covering the town of Barnsley in England. It returned one Member of Parliament (MP) to the House of Commons of the Parliament of the United Kingdom, elected by the first past the post voting system.

== History ==
The constituency was created under the Redistribution of Seats Act 1885 for the 1885 general election and abolished in 1983.

The area formerly covered by the constituency became parts of the Barnsley Central constituency and the Barnsley East constituency.

== Members of Parliament ==
Election	Member	Party
1885	Courtney Kenny	Liberal
1889 by-election	William Compton	Liberal
1897 by-election	Sir Joseph Walton	Liberal
1916	Sir Joseph Walton	Coalition Liberal
1922	Sir Joseph Walton	National Liberal
1922	John Potts	Labour
1931	Richard John Soper	Liberal National
1935	John Potts	Labour
1938 by-election	Frank Collindridge	Labour
1951	Sidney Schofield	Labour
1953 by-election	Roy Mason	Labour
1983	constituency abolished	

== Elections ==
=== Elections in the 1880s ===
General election 1885: Barnsley
Party	Candidate	Votes	%
Liberal	Courtney Kenny	6,705	71.1
Conservative	Bruce Vernon-Wentworth	2,722	28.9
Majority		3,983	42.2
Turnout		9,427	85.4
Registered electors		11,034	
Liberal win (new seat)			

Wentworth

General election 1886: Barnsley
Party	Candidate	Votes	%	±%
Liberal	Courtney Kenny	5,425	65.0	−6.1
Conservative	Bruce Vernon-Wentworth	2,917	35.0	+6.1
Majority		2,508	30.0	−12.2
Turnout		8,342	75.6	−9.8
Registered electors		11,034		
Liberal hold		Swing	−6.1	

Kenny resigned, causing a by-election.

Earl Compton

1889 Barnsley by-election
Party	Candidate	Votes	%	±%
Liberal	William Compton	6,232	62.2	−2.8
Conservative	Bruce Vernon-Wentworth	3,781	37.8	+2.8
Majority		2,451	24.4	−5.6
Turnout		10,013	79.5	+3.9
Registered electors		12,593		
Liberal hold		Swing	−2.8	

=== Elections in the 1890s ===
General election 1892: Barnsley
Party	Candidate	Votes	%	±%
Liberal	William Compton	6,739	65.8	+0.8
Liberal Unionist	Francis Foljambe	3,498	34.2	−0.8
Majority		3,241	31.6	+1.6
Turnout		10,237	75.0	−0.6
Registered electors		13,643		
Liberal hold		Swing	+0.8	

General election 1895: Barnsley
Party	Candidate	Votes	%	±%
Liberal	William Compton	6,820	59.4	−6.4
Conservative	Ronald Greville	4,653	40.6	+6.4
Majority		2,167	18.8	−12.8
Turnout		11,473	80.9	+5.9
Registered electors		14,181		
Liberal hold		Swing	−6.4	

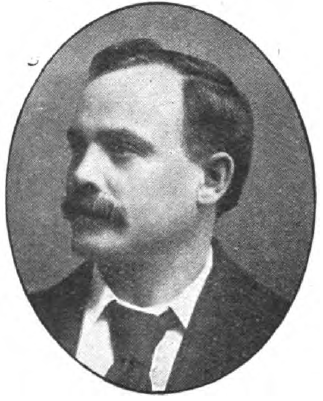
Curran

1897 Barnsley by-election
Party	Candidate	Votes	%	±%
Liberal	Joseph Walton	6,744	59.7	+0.3
Conservative	James Blyth	3,454	30.6	−10.0
Ind. Labour Party	Pete Curran	1,091	9.7	New
Majority		3,290	29.1	+10.3
Turnout		11,289	76.3	−4.6
Registered electors		14,805		
Liberal hold		Swing	+5.2	

=== Elections in the 1900s ===
General election January 1900: Barnsley
Party	Candidate	Votes	%	±%
Liberal	Joseph Walton	7,549	63.4	+4.0
Liberal Unionist	Arthur William Groser	4,356	36.6	−4.0
Majority		3,193	26.8	+8.0
Turnout		11,905	74.6	−6.3
Registered electors		15,948		
Liberal hold		Swing	+4.0	

General election January 1906: Barnsley
Party	Candidate	Votes	%	±%
Liberal	Joseph Walton	Unopposed		
Liberal hold				

=== Elections in the 1910s ===
General election January 1910: Barnsley
Party	Candidate	Votes	%	±%
Liberal	Joseph Walton	12,425	71.1	N/A
Conservative	Arthur William Groser	5,053	28.9	New
Majority		7,372	42.2	N/A
Turnout		17,478	83.8	N/A
Liberal hold		Swing	N/A	

General election December 1910: Barnsley
Party	Candidate	Votes	%	±%
Liberal	Joseph Walton	Unopposed		
Liberal hold				

General election 1918: Barnsley
Party		Candidate	Votes	%
C	National Liberal	Joseph Walton	Unopposed	
	National Liberal win (new boundaries)			
C indicates candidate endorsed by the coalition government.

=== Elections in the 1920s ===
General election 1922: Barnsley
Party	Candidate	Votes	%	±%
Labour	John Potts	14,728	55.1	New
National Liberal	Maurice Moore	12,011	44.9	N/A
Majority		2,717	10.2	N/A
Turnout		26,739	75.7	N/A
Labour gain from National Liberal		Swing		

General election 1923: Barnsley
Party	Candidate	Votes	%	±%
Labour	John Potts	12,674	48.0	−7.1
Unionist	William Craven-Ellis	6,884	26.0	N/A
Liberal	John Neal	6,881	26.0	−18.9
Majority		5,790	22.0	+11.8
Turnout		26,439	74.1	−1.6
Labour hold		Swing		

General election 1924: Barnsley
Party	Candidate	Votes	%	±%
Labour	John Potts	14,738	51.7	+3.7
Liberal	John Neal	13,785	48.5	+22.5
Majority		953	3.2	−18.8
Turnout		28,523	78.2	+4.1
Labour hold		Swing		

Sutherland

General election 1929: Barnsley
Party	Candidate	Votes	%	±%
Labour	John Potts	21,855	53.8	+2.1
Liberal	William Sutherland	12,517	30.8	−17.7
Unionist	William Craven-Ellis	6,265	15.4	New
Majority		9,388	23.0	+19.8
Turnout		40,637	82.3	+4.1
Labour hold		Swing	+9.8	

=== Elections in the 1930s ===
General election 1931: Barnsley
Party	Candidate	Votes	%	±%
National Liberal	Richard John Soper	21,392	50.9	+35.5
Labour	John Potts	20,622	49.1	−4.7
Majority		770	1.8	N/A
Turnout		42,014	84.2	+1.9
National Liberal gain from Labour		Swing		

General election 1935: Barnsley
Party	Candidate	Votes	%	±%
Labour	John Potts	25,318	58.9	+9.8
National Liberal	Richard John Soper	17,683	41.1	−9.8
Majority		7,635	17.8	N/A
Turnout		43,001	82.6	−1.6
Labour gain from National Liberal		Swing		

1938 Barnsley by-election
Party	Candidate	Votes	%	±%
Labour	Frank Collindridge	23,566	64.4	+5.5
National Liberal	Seymour Howard	13,052	35.6	−5.5
Majority		10,514	28.8	+11.0
Turnout		36,618	72.7	−9.9
Labour hold		Swing	+5.5	

=== Elections in the 1940s ===
General election 1945: Barnsley
Party	Candidate	Votes	%	±%
Labour	Frank Collindridge	30,614	72.9	+14.0
National Liberal	Richard John Soper	11,382	27.1	−14.0
Majority		19,232	45.8	+28.0
Turnout		41,996	80.4	−2.2
Labour hold		Swing		

=== Elections in the 1950s ===
General election 1950: Barnsley
Party	Candidate	Votes	%	±%
Labour	Frank Collindridge	42,008	68.6	−4.3
Liberal	Geoffrey Howard Walker	10,779	17.6	New
National Liberal	Charles Gordon-Spencer	8,480	13.8	−13.3
Majority		31,209	51.0	+5.2
Turnout		61,267	88.9	+8.5
Labour hold		Swing		

General election 1951: Barnsley
Party	Candidate	Votes	%	±%
Labour	Sidney Schofield	37,523	69.7	+1.1
National Liberal	Geoffrey Whittaker	9,296	17.3	+3.5
Liberal	Geoffrey Howard Walker	7,002	13.0	−4.6
Majority		28,227	52.4	+1.4
Turnout		53,821	77.2	−11.7
Labour hold		Swing		

1953 Barnsley by-election
Party	Candidate	Votes	%	±%
Labour	Roy Mason	29,283	72.9	+3.2
Conservative	Geoffrey Whittaker	10,905	27.1	+9.8
Majority		18,378	45.8	−6.6
Turnout		40,188		
Labour hold		Swing	−3.3	

General election 1955: Barnsley
Party	Candidate	Votes	%	±%
Labour	Roy Mason	39,485	72.8	+3.1
National Liberal	R. Anthony Wilson	14,776	27.2	+9.9
Majority		24,709	45.6	−6.8
Turnout		54,261	78.6	+1.6
Labour hold		Swing		

General election 1959: Barnsley
Party	Candidate	Votes	%	±%
Labour	Roy Mason	42,565	73.7	+0.9
Conservative	John Philip Howard Bent	15,189	26.3	−0.9
Majority		27,376	47.4	+1.9
Turnout		57,754	82.7	+4.1
Labour hold		Swing		

=== Elections in the 1960s ===
General election 1964: Barnsley
Party	Candidate	Votes	%	±%
Labour	Roy Mason	37,250	66.8	−6.9
Conservative	Joan Hall	9,417	16.9	−9.4
Liberal	John Herbert Dossett	9,089	16.3	New
Majority		27,833	49.9	+2.5
Turnout		55,756	80.0	−2.7
Labour hold		Swing		

General election 1966: Barnsley
Party	Candidate	Votes	%	±%
Labour	Roy Mason	38,744	75.7	+8.9
Conservative	Joan Hall	12,456	24.3	+7.4
Majority		26,288	51.4	+1.5
Turnout		51,200	73.4	−6.6
Labour hold		Swing		

=== Elections in the 1970s ===
General election 1970: Barnsley
Party	Candidate	Votes	%	±%
Labour	Roy Mason	34,956	64.8	−10.9
Conservative	Robert Godber	10,811	20.0	−4.3
Liberal	John Herbert Dossett	8,186	15.2	New
Majority		24,145	44.8	−6.6
Turnout		53,953	71.2	−2.2
Labour hold		Swing		

General election February 1974: Barnsley
Party	Candidate	Votes	%	±%
Labour	Roy Mason	40,595	71.8	+7.0
Conservative	George England	15,969	28.2	+8.2
Majority		24,626	43.6	−1.2
Turnout		56,564	74.6	+3.4
Labour hold		Swing		

General election October 1974: Barnsley
Party	Candidate	Votes	%	±%
Labour	Roy Mason	34,212	65.3	−6.5
Conservative	George England	9,400	18.0	−10.2
Liberal	Peter Tomlinson	8,753	16.7	New
Majority		24,812	47.3	+3.7
Turnout		52,365	68.4	−6.2
Labour hold		Swing		

General election 1979: Barnsley
Party	Candidate	Votes	%	±%
Labour	Roy Mason	36,276	64.0	−1.3
Conservative	George England	13,654	24.1	+6.1
Liberal	Wilfred Whitaker	5,751	10.2	−6.5
Troops Out of Ireland	B. Gallagher	638	1.1	New
Workers Revolutionary	J. Davis	348	0.6	New
Majority		22,622	39.9	−7.4
Turnout		56,667	72.9	+4.5
Labour hold		Swing		

== See also ==
- 1938 Barnsley by-election
- 1953 Barnsley by-election
