= Roy Mason =

British politician (1924-2015)

The Right Honourable The Lord Mason of Barnsley PC DL
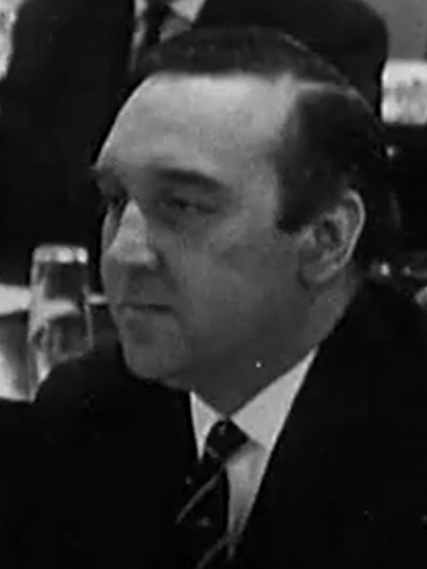
- Mason in 1969

Shadow Minister of Agriculture, Fisheries and Food
- In office 14 July 1979 – 24 November 1981
- Leader: James Callaghan; Michael Foot
- Preceded by: John Silkin
- Succeeded by: Norman Buchan

Shadow Secretary of State for Northern Ireland
- In office 4 May 1979 – 14 July 1979
- Leader: James Callaghan
- Preceded by: Humphrey Atkins
- Succeeded by: Brynmor John

Secretary of State for Northern Ireland
- In office 10 September 1976 – 4 May 1979
- Prime Minister: James Callaghan
- Preceded by: Merlyn Rees
- Succeeded by: Humphrey Atkins

Secretary of State for Defence
- In office 4 March 1974 – 10 September 1976
- Prime Minister: Harold Wilson; James Callaghan
- Preceded by: Ian Gilmour
- Succeeded by: Fred Mulley

President of the Board of Trade
- In office 6 October 1969 – 19 June 1970
- Prime Minister: Harold Wilson
- Preceded by: Anthony Crosland
- Succeeded by: Michael Noble

Minister of Power
- In office 1 July 1968 – 6 October 1969
- Prime Minister: Harold Wilson
- Preceded by: Ray Gunter
- Succeeded by: Office Abolished

Postmaster General
- In office 6 April 1968 – 1 July 1968
- Prime Minister: Harold Wilson
- Preceded by: Edward Short
- Succeeded by: John Stonehouse

Minister of Defence for Equipment
- In office 7 January 1967 – 6 April 1968
- Prime Minister: Harold Wilson
- Preceded by: Office Created
- Succeeded by: John Morris

Minister of State for Trade
- In office 20 October 1964 – 7 January 1967
- Prime Minister: Harold Wilson
- Succeeded by: Joseph Mallalieu

Member of the House of Lords
- Lord Temporal
- Life peerage 20 October 1987 – 20 April 2015

Member of Parliament for Barnsley Central Barnsley (1953–1983)
- In office 31 March 1953 – 18 May 1987
- Preceded by: Sidney Schofield
- Succeeded by: Eric Illsley

Personal details
- Born: 18 April 1924 Royston, West Yorkshire, England
- Died: 19 April 2015 (aged 91) Barnsley, South Yorkshire, England
- Party: Labour
- Education: London School of Economics

Roy Mason, Baron Mason of Barnsley, PC, DL (18 April 1924 – 19 April 2015), was a British Labour Party politician and Cabinet minister who was Secretary of State for Defence and Secretary of State for Northern Ireland in the 1970s.

== Early life ==
Mason was born in Royston, West Yorkshire, on 18 April 1924, and grew up in Carlton, Barnsley, also in the West Yorkshire. Mason became a miner at the age of 14. He became a branch official of the National Union of Mineworkers (NUM) in his early twenties. Aged 26, he studied at the London School of Economics as a mature student on a Trades Union Congress (TUC) scholarship. He remained in the coal industry until he was elected as Member of Parliament (MP) for the Barnsley constituency at a by-election in 1953.

== Posts ==
Mason was Labour Party spokesman on Home Affairs, Defence and the Post Office, 1960–1964. Minister of State at the Board of Trade, 1964–1967. Minister of Defence (Equipment), 1967–1968. Minister of Power, 1968–1969. President of the Board of Trade, 1969–1970. Secretary of State for Defence, 1974–1976. Secretary of State for Northern Ireland, 1976–1979

== Northern Ireland ==
A high-profile politician, Mason's appointment to Northern Ireland was unexpected and seemed to indicate a tougher response from the British Government than had been pursued by his predecessor, Merlyn Rees. In late 1976, he told the Labour Party conference that "Ulster had had enough of initiatives, White Papers and legislation for the time being, and now needed to be governed firmly and fairly". He rejected both military and political solutions in favour of "justice for all; with equality before the law; and, crucially, with republican terrorism treated as a security problem, and nothing else".

While Secretary of State for Defence, Mason had been responsible for the introduction of SAS units into the 'bandit country' of South Armagh. At Stormont Mason was responsible for the tougher role taken by the security forces and authorised an increase in British Army covert tactics with the SAS allowed to operate throughout Northern Ireland. Mason's time in Northern Ireland was characterised by a reduction in violence; "in 1976 there were 297 deaths in Northern Ireland; in the next three years the figures were 111, 80, 120. In 1977, he stood up to militant loyalists attempting to repeat their successful Ulster Workers Council strike tactic of 1974. The same year, he twice attempted to get some movement towards a political settlement from the local political parties. In March 1979, the Irish National Liberation Army planned to assassinate Mason, but the plan was aborted.

Mason's policies in Northern Ireland earned the ire of Irish nationalist MPs. That played a part in the March 1979 vote of no confidence, which the Labour government lost by one vote, precipitating the 1979 general election. The Nationalist MP Gerry Fitt abstained in the vote of no confidence and stated that he could not support a government with Mason as its Northern Ireland secretary.

After Labour's election defeat in 1979, Mason came under increasing pressure from some on the left in his constituency party and from Arthur Scargill but did not countenance joining the Social Democratic Party. Mason received full police protection over 30 years after leaving office. In 1982, Energy Secretary Nigel Lawson suggested to Margaret Thatcher that she should make Mason the next Coal Board chairman, but she refused by saying that Mason was "Not one of us". Instead, Ian MacGregor was appointed.

== Later life ==
After his retirement from the House of Commons at the 1987 general election, Mason was created a life peer on 20 October 1987 taking the title Baron Mason of Barnsley, of Barnsley in South Yorkshire. He lived in the same semi-detached house with his wife Marjorie from their marriage until he was aged 84.

Mason died at Highgrove Nursing Home, Stanley Road, Barnsley one day after his 91st birthday, on 19 April 2015. He had suffered from cerebrovascular disease. He was survived by his wife and his two daughters.

Parliament of the United Kingdom
Preceded by Sidney Schofield	Member of Parliament for Barnsley; 1953–1983	Constituency abolished
New constituency	Member of Parliament for Barnsley Central; 1983–1987	Succeeded by Eric Illsley
Political offices
Preceded by Edward Short	Postmaster General; 1968	Succeeded by John Stonehouse
Preceded by Ray Gunter	Minister of Power; 1968–1969	Position abolished
Preceded by Anthony Crosland	President of the Board of Trade; 1969–1970	Succeeded by Michael Noble
Preceded by Ian Gilmour	Secretary of State for Defence; 1974–1976	Succeeded by Fred Mulley
Preceded by Merlyn Rees	Secretary of State for Northern Ireland; 1976–1979	Succeeded by Humphrey Atkins
