= Great Rissington =

Coordinates: 51°51′18″N 1°43′07″W

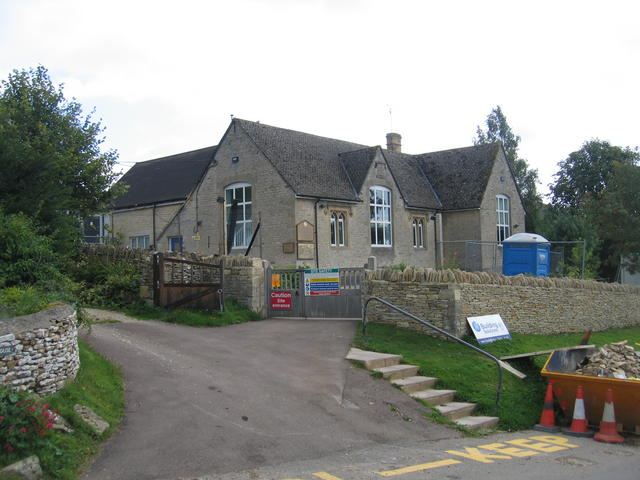
- Great Rissington School

- Location within Gloucestershire
- Population: 367 (2011 Census)
- District: Cotswold
- Shire county: Gloucestershire
- Region: South West
- Country: England
- Sovereign state: United Kingdom
- Post town: Cheltenham
- Postcode district: GL54
- Police: Gloucestershire
- Fire: Gloucestershire
- Ambulance: South Western
- UK Parliament: North Cotswolds

Great Rissington is a village in the Cotswold district of Gloucestershire, England. The population at the 2011 census was 367.

== History ==
The church of St John the Baptist is 12th century, with the central tower decorated with battlements and pinnacles being 15th century. The south transept was added in the 13th century. There is a memorial to John Barnarde, who died in 1621 as well as a memorial to soldiers from the village who died in the First World War.

In the First World War, the Souls family lost 5 of their 6 sons in war. They were paid a shilling a week for each dead son in compensation and later moved to Great Barrington.

== Amenities ==
The village contains a church, a pub, called the Lamb Inn and a 17th-century manor house.

== Howard baronets ==
In 1955, the Howard baronets of Great Rissington were created:

- Sir (Harold Walter) Seymour Howard, 1st Baronet (1888–1967)
- Sir Hamilton Edward de Coucey Howard, 2nd Baronet (1915–2001)
- Sir David Howarth Seymour Howard, 3rd Baronet (born 1945)

== Notable residents ==
Joan and Victor Eyles retired to Great Rissington in 1962.

== Gallery ==
Great Rissington
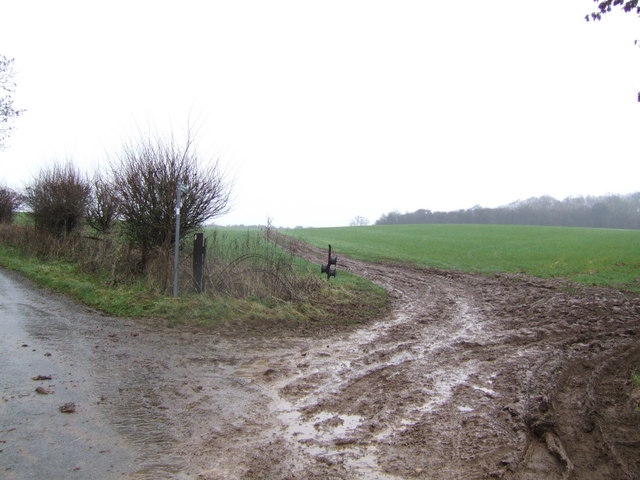
Bridleway to Great Rissington

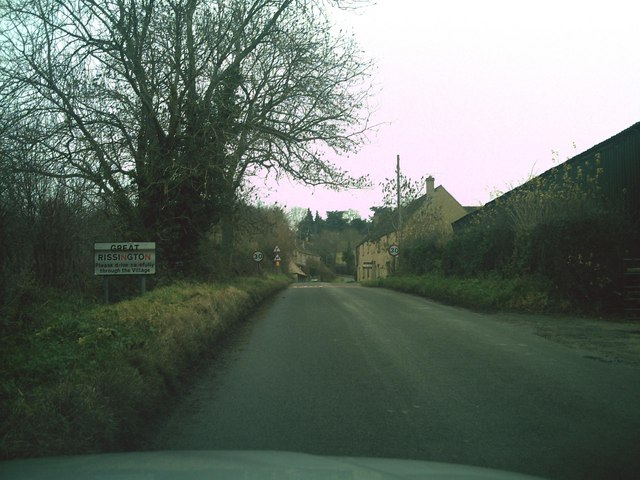
Entering Great Rissington

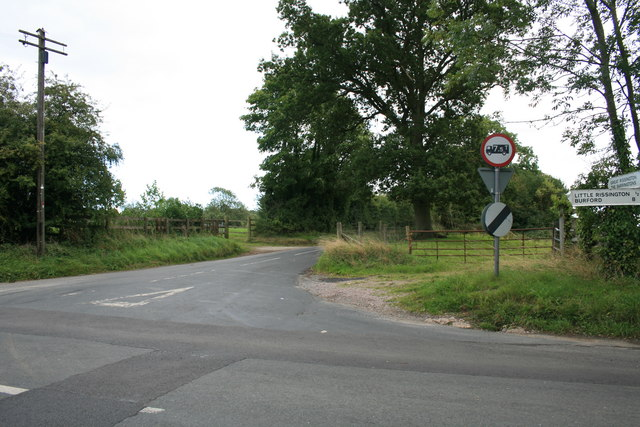
Turning to Great Rissington

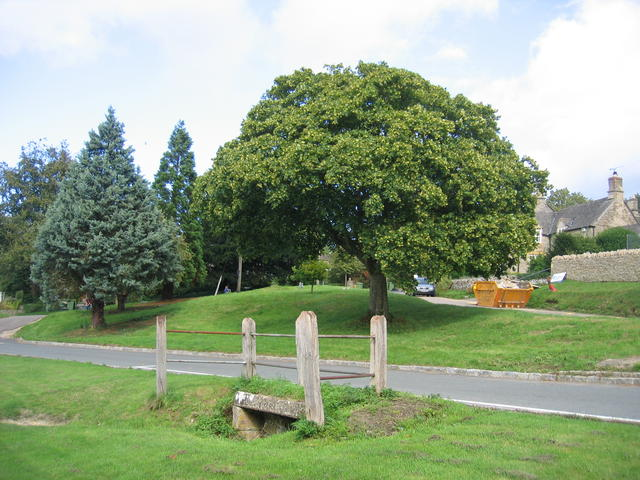
Village Green in Great Rissington

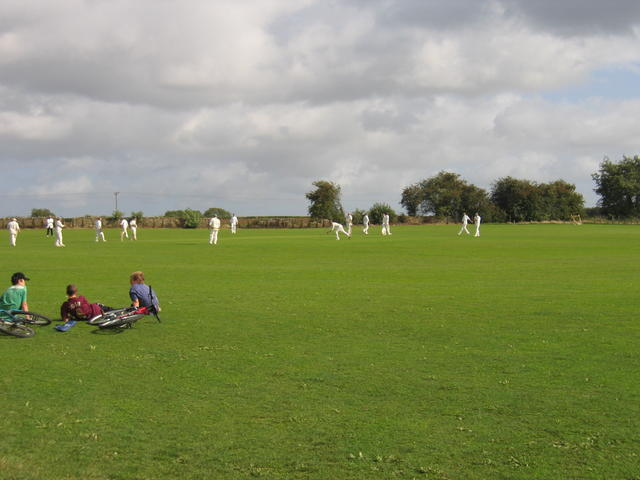
Cricket green in Great Rissington

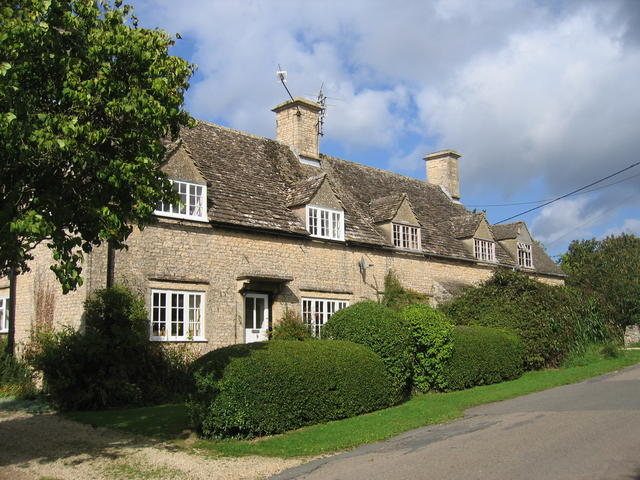
Typical village cottages in Great Rissington

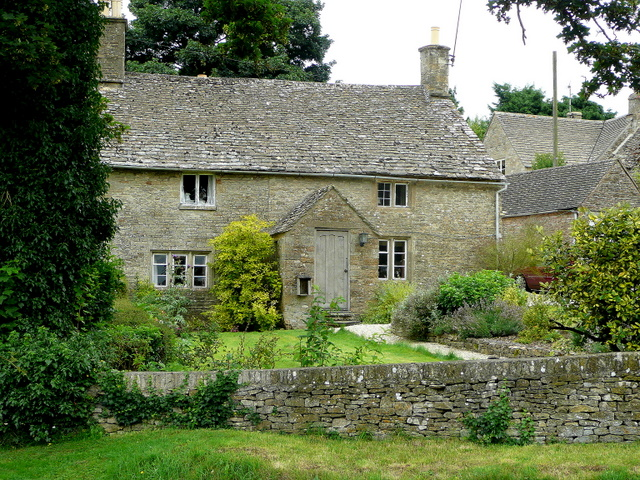
Another cottage in Great Rissington

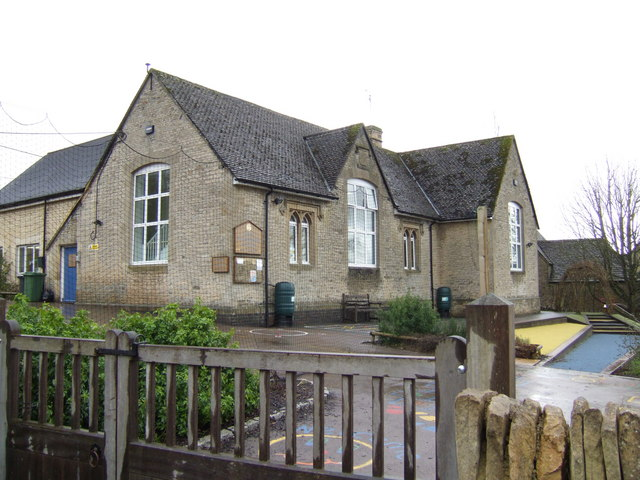
Primary school in Great Rissington

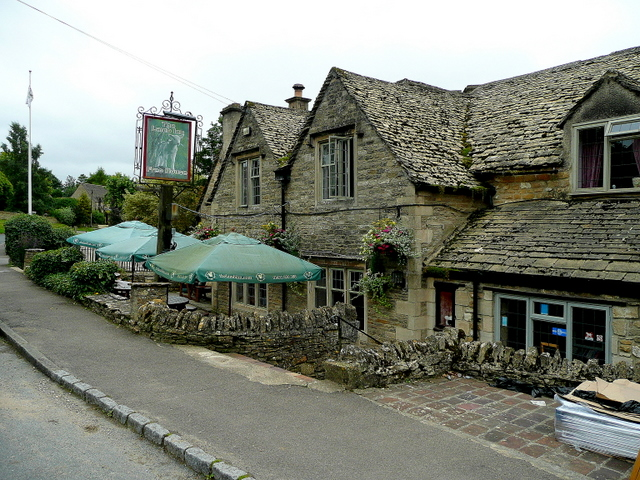
The Lamb Inn, a pub in Great Rissington

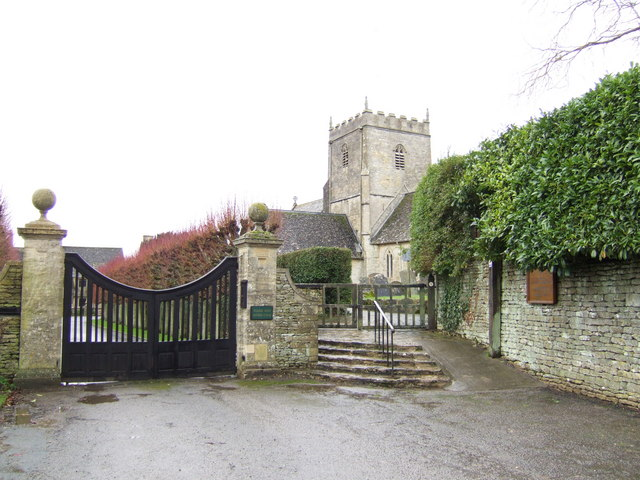
St John the Baptist's Church in Great Rissington
