= Dominic Carman =

English journalist and writer (born 1961)

- Born: 23 August 1961 (age 65); Hale, Cheshire, England
- Education: Durham University
- Occupation: Journalist
- Political party: Liberal Democrats
- Parent(s): George Carman; Cecilia Sparrow

Dominic Carman (born 23 August 1961) is a British journalist, writer and Liberal Democrat political activist.

== Family ==
Dominic Carman was born on 23 August 1961 in Hale, Cheshire. Educated at Manchester Grammar School and Durham University, Carman is the son of barrister George Carman. He wrote a biography of his father, No Ordinary Man: A Life of George Carman, which was published in 2002.

== Politics and anti-BNP campaigner ==
When he was sixteen, Carman spent three weeks as a member of the National Front in September 1977. Writing about this in The Guardian in 2010, he commented "Becoming a member was done rashly, angrily, without any thought of what it meant, or of the consequences. It was a stupid decision, undertaken with one purpose: to annoy my father." He also said "When I eventually sat down and opened National Front News, my sense of euphoric defiance ended – very abruptly", as it was filled with "hate-filled articles" about Jewish people, Holocaust denial and black and Asian immigration into Britain. "Disgusted and shocked, my stomach churned, my thoughts ran wild. So this is what they believed. Oh God, what had I done? ... I immediately resigned from the NF, less than a month after joining."

In 2005, he took part in ITV's Vote for Me television programme in which the public selected an individual to stand at the next general election, losing in the final to Rodney Hylton-Potts.

Carman researched an unofficial biography of British National Party leader Nick Griffin, but this has not been published. Carman used his research to support his campaign as the Liberal Democrat candidate in Barking at the 2010 General Election, where he stood against Griffin. Carman finished fourth of ten candidates, with 8.2%, one place behind Griffin on 14.8%.

He contested the 2011 Barnsley Central by-election for the Liberal Democrats, coming in sixth place out of nine, with 4.18% and therefore losing his deposit. In an article in the Daily Mail, Carman was critical of some of the Barnsley electorate, stating that "diversity and difference are not welcome here"; he defended his comments when interviewed by Andrew Neil on the BBC's The Politics Show.

== Elections contested ==
UK Parliament Elections

Date of election	Constituency	Party	Votes	%
2010 United Kingdom general election	Barking	Liberal Democrat	3,719	8.2
2011 Barnsley Central by-election	Barnsley Central	Liberal Democrat	1,012	4.2
