= 1953 Barnsley by-election =

UK parliamentary by-election

The 1953 Barnsley by-election was a by-election held on 31 March 1953 for the British House of Commons constituency of Barnsley in the West Riding of Yorkshire.

The seat had become vacant on the resignation of the Labour Member of Parliament (MP) Sidney Schofield, who had represented the constituency since the 1951 general election.

The Labour candidate, Roy Mason, held the seat for his party with a reduced majority. He went on to hold a series of cabinet posts in the Labour governments of the 1960s and 1970s.

== Result ==
Barnsley by-election, 1953
Party	Candidate	Votes	%	±%
Labour	Roy Mason	29,283	72.9	+3.2
Conservative	Geoffrey Whittaker	10,905	27.1	+9.8
Majority		18,378	45.8	−6.5
Turnout		40,188		
Labour hold		Swing	−3.3	

== See also ==
- Barnsley (UK Parliament constituency)
- 1897 Barnsley by-election
- 1938 Barnsley by-election
- 2011 Barnsley Central by-election
- List of United Kingdom by-elections
