= Seymour Howard =

English stockbroker and Liberal politician

Sir Harold Walter Seymour Howard, 1st Baronet (1886–1967) was an English stockbroker and Liberal politician who served as Lord Mayor of London.

== Background ==
Howard was born on 8 April 1886. His father was William Albert Howard (1854-1940) and his mother, Elizabeth Mary Seymour. He married Edith Maud Turner on 10 September 1913. They had two sons: Sir Hamilton Edward de Coucey Howard, 2nd Baronet (1915-2001). David Seymour de Coucey Howard (1919-1954). Later, they resided at Adelaide Crescent in Hove, East Sussex. He became a Knight Commander in the Order of Christ of Portugal and a Knight of Grace in the Order of St. John of Jerusalem.

In February 1955, he was knighted. Ten months later, in December of that year, he became Sir Seymour Howard, 1st Baronet of Great Rissington.

== Career ==
He was a Director of Home and Foreign Securities Corporation. In September 1930 he was adopted by Chippenham Liberal Association as their prospective parliamentary candidate. Chippenham was regarded by the Liberal party as a good prospect, given that their candidate in 1929 had come second, only 1,731 votes behind the winning Conservative. At the time Howard was also living in Corsham, which was a part of the constituency. However, in the political climate of 1931, his Conservative opponent was seen as the most natural candidate in support of the newly formed National Government;

General Election 1931: Chippenham Electorate 36,282
Party	Candidate	Votes	%	±%
Conservative	Victor Alexander Cazalet	17,232	56.8	+10.2
Liberal	Harold Walter Seymour Howard	10,928	36.0	−4.6
Labour	William Robert Robins	2,194	7.2	−5.6
Majority		6,304	20.8	+14.8
Turnout			83.7	
Conservative hold		Swing	+7.4	

In May 1938 Howard agreed to stand again for parliament at the 1938 Barnsley by-election as a Liberal candidate in support of the National Government. Barnsley had last been won by a Liberal at the 1931 General Election. Following the Liberal split of that year, the Barnsley Liberal Association had supported its MPs decision to join the Liberal National breakaway. The Barnsley Conservative Association had chosen not to run candidates of their own and instead support Liberal National candidates. However, Labour had easily regained the seat in 1935. Howard received Conservative support and might have hoped to re-gain the seat but was well beaten;

1938 Barnsley by-election Electorate
Party	Candidate	Votes	%	±%
Labour	Frank Collindridge	23,566	64.4	+5.5
National Liberal	Harold Walter Seymour Howard	13,052	35.6	−5.5
Majority		10,514	28.8	+11.0
Turnout		36,618	72.7	−9.9
Labour hold		Swing	+5.5	

During the Second World War, he worked at the Ministry of Aircraft Production. He served as Sheriff of the City of London in 1944 and Lord Mayor of London in 1954, as well as Alderman of the City of London from 1945 to 1960. He was a Conservative Party member of the London County Council from 1946 to 1949 representing the City of London.

Political offices
Preceded by Sir Noël Bowater, Bt	Lord Mayor of London; 1954	Succeeded by Cuthbert Ackroyd
Baronetage of the United Kingdom
New creation	Baronet (of Great Rissington); 1955–1967	Succeeded by Edward Howard
