= John Potts (British politician) =

British politician (1861–1938)

John Potts MP

Member of Parliament for Barnsley
- In office 1922–1931
- Preceded by: Joseph Walton
- Succeeded by: Richard John Soper

Member of Parliament for Barnsley
- In office 1935–1938
- Preceded by: Richard John Soper
- Succeeded by: Frank Collindridge

Personal details
- Born: John Samuel Potts; 12 August 1861 Bolton
- Died: 28 April 1938 (aged 76) Barnsley
- Party: Labour

John Samuel Potts (12 August 1861 – 28 April 1938) was a Labour Party politician in the United Kingdom who served as Member of Parliament (MP) for twelve years between 1922 and 1938.

Born in Bolton, Lancashire, Potts had started work at Durham Colliery at the age of eleven. He was a checkweighman at the Hemsworth Colliery, Yorkshire, for 25 years. At the Barnsley by-election of 1897, Potts supported the Liberal Party candidate Joseph Walton. While chairing a Liberal election meeting during this by-election, Potts said in the presence of Walton that he would favour a labour party at a time when state payment of MPs, and of official election expenses would enable working men to be maintained in Parliament but until then, "the Liberal Party was the working man’s only hope". In 1905, Potts switched sides, and began working with the Independent Labour Party, against both Walton and the leadership of the Yorkshire Miners' Association (YMA). Ten years later, Potts was elected as treasurer of the YMA, and became a member of the executive committee of the Miners' Federation of Great Britain. He kept these positions until he was elected as the Member of Parliament for Barnsley at the 1922 general election, when payment of MPs and election expenses had been enacted. Potts retained the seat at three further elections in the 1920s. When Labour split at the 1931 general election over Ramsay MacDonald's formation of a National Government, he narrowly lost his seat to the National Liberal candidate Richard John Soper.

Potts was comfortably re-elected at the 1935 general election, but died in office in 1938, in Barnsley, aged 76. His illness and death have been connected with the shock he received when the Wharncliffe Woodmoor Pit Disaster occurred two years earlier. He lived on the lane which led to the colliery.

Parliament of the United Kingdom
Preceded by Sir Joseph Walton	Member of Parliament for Barnsley; 1922–1931	Succeeded by Richard John Soper
Preceded by Richard John Soper	Member of Parliament for Barnsley; 1935–1938	Succeeded by Frank Collindridge
