= William Compton, 4th Marquess of Northampton =

British peer and Royal Navy Admiral (1818–1897)

Admiral The Most Honourable The Marquess of Northampton KG
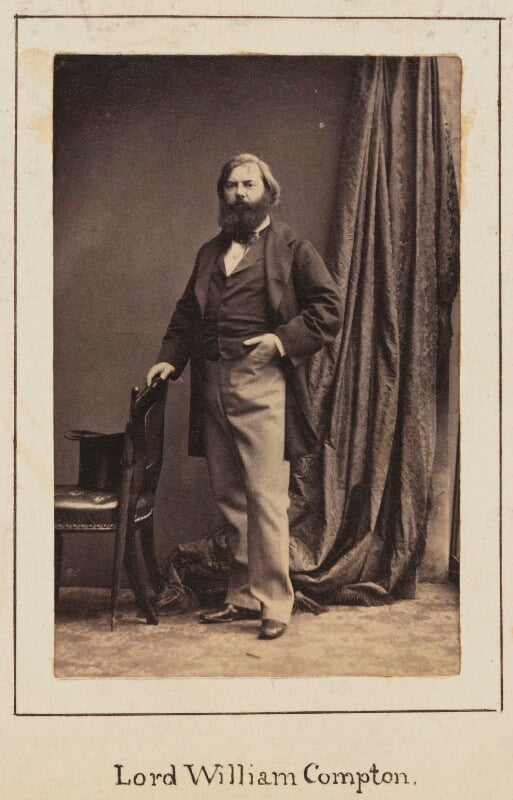
- Compton in the 1860s
- Born: 20 August 1818; Marylebone, London
- Died: 11 September 1897 (aged 79)
- Spouse: Eliza Elliot (m. 1844–1877)
- Children: 8
- Military career
- Allegiance: United Kingdom
- Branch: Royal Navy
- Service years: 1831–1856
- Rank: Admiral
- Commands: HMS Modeste
- Conflicts: First Opium War; Battle of Canton; Battle of Chinhai

Admiral William Compton, 4th Marquess of Northampton, KG (20 August 1818 – 11 September 1897), known as Lord William Compton from 1828 to 1877, was a British peer and Royal Navy officer.

== Biography ==
Northampton was born at York Place, Marylebone, London, the second son of Spencer Joshua Alwyne Compton, 2nd Marquess of Northampton, and his wife Margaret (née Douglas-Maclean-Clephane).

He entered in the Royal Navy in 1831, served during the First Opium War He retired from the active list in 1856 as captain. He was subsequently promoted rear admiral in 1869, and admiral in 1880 on the retired list.

In 1877 he succeeded his elder brother in the marquessate and entered the House of Lords. Northampton was honoured on 9 July 1885 when he was made a Knight of the Garter. He assumed in 1851 by Royal licence the additional surname of Maclean and in 1878 upon succeeding to the titles that of Douglas.

In 1894 he donated the lands in Northampton Square (Clerkenwell, central London) for Northampton Institute (so named in his honour), now City St George's, University of London.

== Family ==
Lord Northampton married Eliza Harriet, daughter of Admiral Sir George Elliot, granddaughter of Gilbert Elliot-Murray-Kynynmound, 1st Earl of Minto on 21 August 1844 in Naples, Italy. One of her sisters, Georgiana Maria, became Countess of Northesk by her marriage to William Carnegie, 8th Earl of Northesk. As a result of her marriage, Eliza Elliot was styled firstly as Lady William Compton and as Marchioness of Northampton on 3 March 1877. Together they had five daughters and three sons. She died aged 72 on 4 December 1877 in Florence, Italy.

Children of Admiral William Compton, 4th Marquess of Northampton & his wife Eliza Harriet née Elliot

1. Lady Katrine Cecilia Compton b: 1845 d. 23 Mar 1913
2. Lady Margaret Georgiana Compton b: 1847 d. 15 Nov 1931
3. Charles John Spencer Compton, Earl Compton b. 13 Jul 1849, d. 5 Sep 1887
4. William George Spencer Scott Compton, 5th Marquess of Northampton b. 23 Apr 1851, d. 15 Jun 1913
5. Lady Alice Elizabeth Compton b: 1854 d. 17 Jun 1862
6. Lord Alwyne Frederick Compton b. 5 Jun 1855, d. 16 Dec 1911
7. Lady Mabel Violet Isabel Compton b. c 1862, d. 16 Aug 1961
8. Colonel Lord Douglas James Cecil Compton b. 15 Nov 1865, d. 23 Jul 1944

Their eldest daughter, Katrine, married Francis Cowper, 7th Earl Cowper.

Their eldest son Charles John Spencer Compton, Earl Compton, died in 1887, without heirs. Lord Northampton survived his wife by twenty years and died on 11 September 1897, aged 78. Just prior to his death, Compton purchased a country house in the village of Tysoe in Warwickshire. He was succeeded in his titles by his second son William.

== Coat of arms ==
Coat of arms of William Compton, 4th Marquess of Northampton
Coronet A coronet of an Marquess Crest 1st, on a mount a beacon fired proper, behind it a ribbon inscribed with the words, Nisi Dominus; 2nd, a battle-axe erect in pale, crossed by a branch of laurel and cypress in saltire, all proper; 3rd, a sanglier, sticking betwixt two clefts of an oak tree, with a chain and lock holding them, all proper, in a scroll above, Lock sicker. Escutcheon Quarterly, Ist and 4th grand quarters sable, a lion passant guardant or, between three esquires' helmets argent (Compton); 2nd grand quarter quarterly, 1st argent, a lion rampant gules; 2nd argent, a dexter arm in armour issuing from the sinister in fesse proper, holding a cross crosslet in pale azure; 3rd per fesse argent and vert, a galley, her oars in action and sails furled sable, in base a salmon naiant proper; 4th azure, a castle triple tower proper, with flags gules (Maclean); 3rd grand quarter quarterly, 1st and 4th argent, a man's heart gules, ensigned with an Imperial crown proper, and on a chief azure, three stars of the first; 2nd and 3rd argent, three piles issuing from a chief gules, on the last two stars of the first, all within a bordure azure, charged with eight buckles or (Douglas). Supporters Dexter, a dragon ermine, ducally gorged and chained or; Sinister, an unicorn argent, horned, maned, hoofed, and tufted sable. Motto Je ne serche qu'un. I seek but one.

== See also ==
- O'Byrne, William Richard (1849). "Compton, William" . A Naval Biographical Dictionary . John Murray – via Wikisource.

== Notes ==
Peerage of the United Kingdom
Preceded by Charles Douglas-Compton	Marquess of Northampton; 2nd creation 1877–1897	Succeeded by William Compton
