= Frank Collindridge =

British politician (1891–1951)

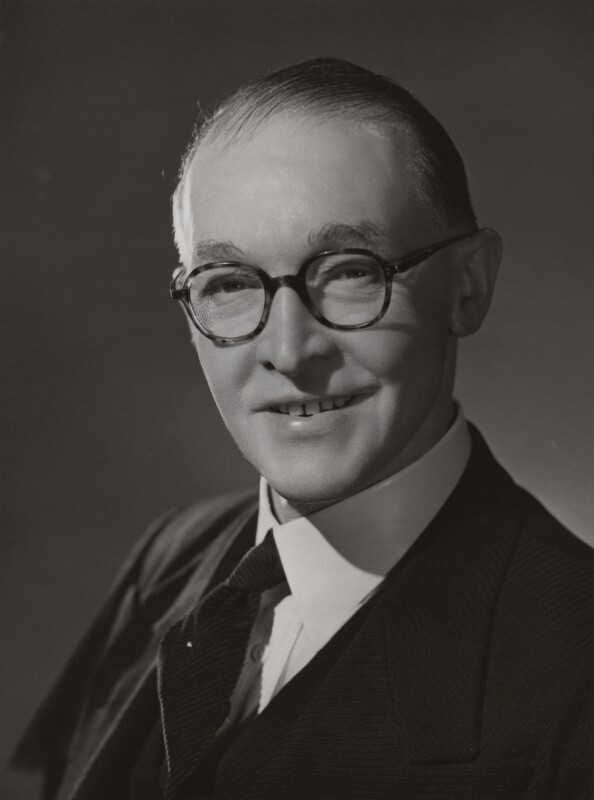
Collindridge in 1950

Frank Collindridge CBE (1891 – 16 October 1951) was a Labour Party politician in the United Kingdom.

Born in Barnsley, Collindridge became a coal miner, and became active in the Miners' Federation of Great Britain (MFGB) and the Labour Party. He served on Wombwell Urban District Council from 1920 until 1939, including a stint as chair in 1931/32. In 1937, he served on an MFGB delegation to the Soviet Union, and in 1944 on one to Australia and New Zealand.

Collindridge was elected as member of parliament (MP) for Barnsley at a by-election in 1938, and represented the constituency until he died during the campaign for the 1951 general election in Barnsley aged 60.

In Clement Attlee's post-war Labour Government he was a government whip, with the formal titles of Lord of the Treasury from 1945 to 1946, and Comptroller of the Household from 1946 to 1951.

Parliament of the United Kingdom
Preceded by John Samuel Potts	Member of Parliament for Barnsley; 1938–1951	Succeeded by Sidney Schofield
Political offices
Preceded by Michael Stewart	Comptroller of the Household (government whip); 1946–1951	Succeeded by Roger Conant
