= Spencer Compton, 2nd Marquess of Northampton =

British nobleman and president of the Royal Society

The Most Honourable The Marquess of Northampton FRS FGS
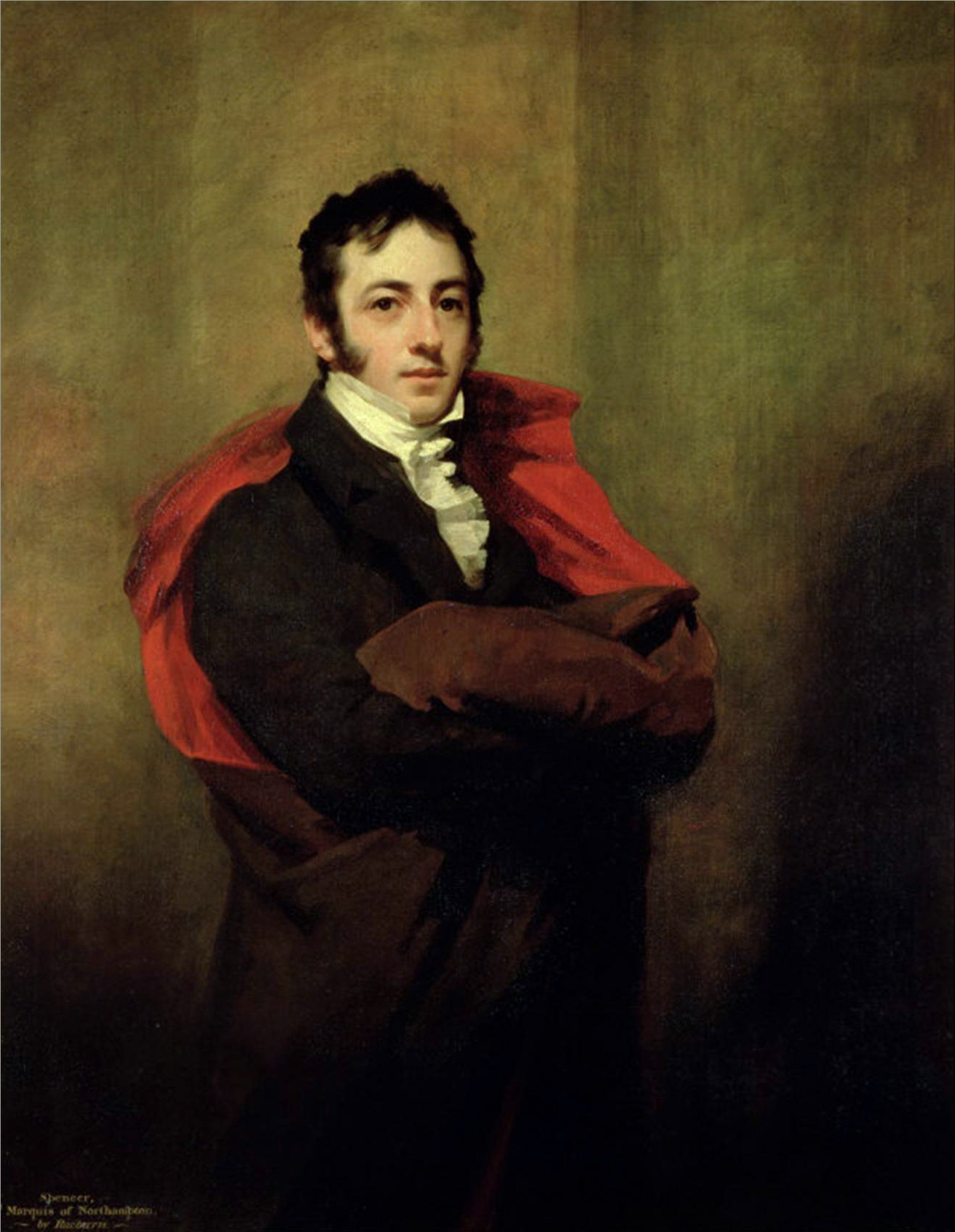
- A painting of the Marquess of Northampton made by Henry Raeburn in 1821.

26th President of the Royal Society
- In office 1838–1848
- Preceded by: Prince Augustus Frederick
- Succeeded by: William Parsons

Member of Parliament for Northampton
- In office 1812–1820
- Preceded by: Spencer Perceval
- Succeeded by: George Robinson

Personal details
- Born: 2 January 1790
- Died: 17 January 1851 (aged 61)
- Resting place: Castle Ashby
- Spouse: Margaret Douglas-Maclean-Clephane (m. 1815; died 1830)
- Children: 6, including Charles, William, and Alwyne
- Parent(s): Charles Compton, 1st Marquess of Northampton; Maria Smith
- Education: Trinity College, Cambridge

Spencer Joshua Alwyne Compton, 2nd Marquess of Northampton (2 January 1790 – 17 January 1851), known as Lord Compton from 1796 to 1812 and as Earl Compton from 1812 to 1828, was a British nobleman and patron of science and the arts.

== Life ==
The second son of the 9th Earl of Northampton (later the First Marquess), Compton studied at Trinity College, Cambridge, receiving a Master of Arts degree in 1810. In 1812, following the assassination of his cousin, the prime minister Spencer Perceval, Compton, by now Earl Compton as heir to the Marquessate, took his seat for Northampton in the House of Commons.

On 24 July 1815, he married Margaret Maclean Clephane, eldest daughter of Major-general Douglas Maclean Clephane.

In the Commons, Compton established a reputation as something of a maverick. Despite his family's strong Tory credentials, he often voted against the Tory government of the day. This led to his losing his seat in the general election of 1820.

After 1820 Compton took up residence in Italy, where his house became a centre of attraction, and exercised his influence in favour of many of the unfortunate victims of despotic authority both in Lombardy and in Naples. He returned to England in 1830, and became a prominent figure in political and cultural life. He supported the Reform Bill in the House of Lords, but became more engaged in promoting the arts and sciences.

In 1820–22 he was president of the Geological Society of London. He served as president of the Archaeological Institute of Great Britain and Ireland (1845–46 and 1850–51), and in 1838 became president of the Royal Society, an office he held for ten years. He took a particular interest in geology, especially in fossils, although he was not himself a scientist, but more of an interested amateur. The dinosaur species Regnosaurus northamptoni was named after him. He resigned in 1848, due to his opposition to the Society's increasing professionalization. Compton was elected a Foreign Honorary Member of the American Academy of Arts and Sciences in 1846. He held the position of president of the Royal Society of Literature from 1849 until his death.

He died on 17 January 1851, and was buried at Castle Ashby on 25 January.

== Family ==
On 24 July 1815 Compton married Margaret Douglas-Maclean-Clephane, who was a poet admired by Sir Walter Scott and William Wordsworth, although her poetry was not published. The marriage was a happy one, producing six children. The couple lived in Italy for ten years from 1820 to 1830. Compton succeeded his father as Marquess of Northampton in 1828. Following Lady Northampton's death in 1830, Northampton returned to England. Clephane Road, on the Northampton estate in Canonbury, north London, is named after her.

Among their children were:

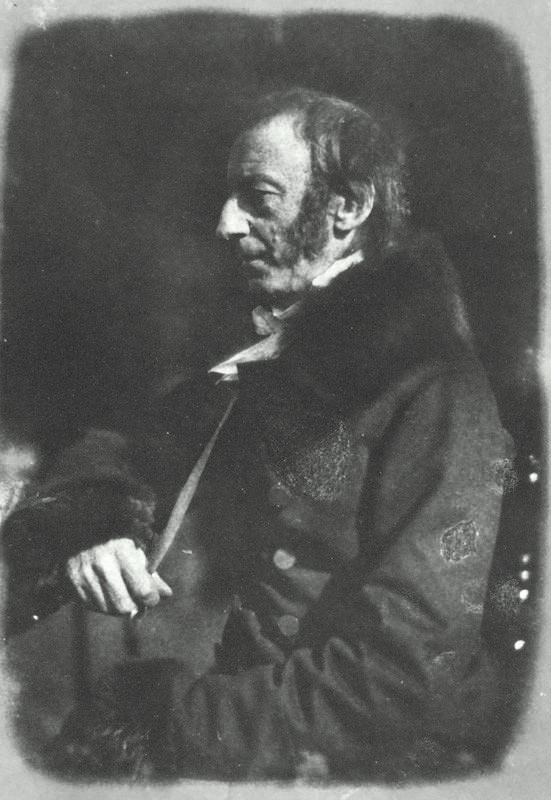
Spencer Compton, 2nd Marquess of Northampton in 1844

- Charles Compton, 3rd Marquess of Northampton (1816–1877)
- Lady Marianne Margaret Compton (1817–1888), later Lady Marian Alford
- Admiral William Compton, 4th Marquess of Northampton (1818–1897)
- Lord Alwyne Compton (1825–1906), successively Dean of Worcester and Bishop of Ely
- Lady Margaret Compton, married Frederick Leveson-Gower

== See also ==
- List of presidents of the Royal Society

Parliament of the United Kingdom
Preceded by Spencer Perceval; William Hanbury Bateman	Member of Parliament for Northampton; 1812 – 1820; With: William Hanbury Bateman 1812–1818; Sir Edward Kerrison 1818–1820	Succeeded by Sir George Robinson; William Leader Maberly
Peerage of the United Kingdom
Preceded by Charles Compton	Marquess of Northampton; 2nd creation 1828–1851	Succeeded by Charles Douglas-Compton
Professional and academic associations
Preceded by Prince Augustus Frederick, Duke of Sussex	26th President of the Royal Society; 1838–1848	Succeeded by William Parsons
