= 1897 Barnsley by-election =

UK parliamentary by-election

The 1897 Barnsley by-election, was a by-election held on 28 October 1897 for the House of Commons of the United Kingdom. It was notable for its role in the development of the Independent Labour Party.

== Background ==
The constituency of Barnsley had been created in 1885, and was a safe seat for the Liberal Party. Since a by-election in 1889, it had been held by the Earl Compton. On 11 September 1897, Compton's father died, and he succeeded as the Marquess of Northampton, thereby forfeiting his seat in the House of Commons and necessitating a by-election. There were eleven candidates for the Liberal nomination, including William Pollard Byles, William Sproston Caine, A. E. Fletcher, George William Erskine Russell and Charles Trevelyan. Ultimately, the party nominated Joseph Walton, a County Durham-based owner of collieries and coal and coke merchants. He had stood in Doncaster in 1895, but had narrowly lost the seat.

At each election since its creation, the seat had been contested by both the Liberal Party and an opponent from the Conservative Party (or, on one occasion, from the Liberal Unionist Party). The Conservative's best result had come at the 1895 general election, where Ronald Greville had taken 40.6% of the vote. The following year, he had been elected for Bradford East, so he was not available to contest the by-election. After a struggle to find a candidate, the party selected James Blyth, a London-based captain in the Oxfordshire Light Infantry and a friend of Wakefield MP Lord Milton. He had no political experience, and it was widely suspected that the party held no hope of capturing the seat.

The Independent Labour Party (ILP) had been founded in 1893 as a socialist party, committed to securing MPs who were independent of the Liberal Party. The party stood 28 candidates at the 1895 general election, but did not win a single seat, and various by-election candidates had also performed poorly. They decided to stand Pete Curran, the national organiser of the National Union of Gasworkers and General Labourers. He was a member of the Fabian Society and of the Social Democratic Federation, and had stood in Barrow in 1895, coming bottom of the poll.

== Campaign ==
By far the largest employer in the area was the coal industry, and Barnsley was a stronghold of the Yorkshire Miners Association (YMA). Although he was not part of the Lib-Lab movement, Walton courted the support of local miners, and the YMA quickly gave him its backing. Ben Pickard, General Secretary of the YMA, was a particularly strong supporter, and he claimed that Curran was in league with the Conservatives. John Potts, checkweighman at Hemsworth Colliery, also supported Walton, although with some reservations. He said in the presence of Walton that he would favour a labour party at a time when state payment of MPs, and of election expenses would enable working men to be maintained in Parliament. But for now, "the Liberal party was the working man’s only hope". Walton campaigned on much of the YMA's agenda, including an eight-hour working day for miners, the introduction of old age pensions and voting reform, although he opposed their campaign for nationalisation of the mines. He also admitted to sending coal to Yorkshire during the YMA strike of 1893, excusing this on the grounds that Yorkshire coal had been sent to County Durham during a strike up there.

Blyth opposed an eight-hour day, stating that it should not be a matter for parliamentary legislation. He hoped that the passage of the Workmen's Compensation Act under the Conservative government would garner him support, but it led many colliery owners, otherwise strong Conservatives, to refuse to campaign for him.

Barnsley and District Trades and Labour Council, which did not include any miners' representatives, backed Curran. The ILP held a large number of meetings, bringing prominent speakers from around the country. They attracted large audiences, although they were strongly heckled and possibly attacked in Wombwell. Their campaign focussed on attacking Walton's role as an employer, claiming he had victimised miners. However, the Liberals countered, claiming that Curran had deserted his wife and was either an Orangeman or a Roman Catholic.

== Result ==
Walton held the seat comfortably, receiving a slight increase in his share of the vote. Their triumph was largely put down to the work of Pickard, and some liberal newspapers used the share as evidence that the ILP vote was coming from former Conservative supporters, not from Liberals. The ILP was disappointed by their weak showing, taking only 9.7% of the vote. The organisation was put in debt by paying its share of the election expenses, and as a result was not able to contest any further by-elections until 1900. However, it did manage to recruit some more members in the district. Ultimately, the defeat led to a re-evaluation of its approach, and to adopt instead a short-term policy of uniting all trade unions, socialist or not, into one political party. This vision led to the formation of the Labour Representation Committee and, ultimately, the Labour Party.

Walton held the seat until he stood down in 1922. Blyth did not contest any further elections, but Curran was eventually elected at the 1907 Jarrow by-election.

Barnsley by-election, 1897
Party	Candidate	Votes	%	±%
Liberal	Joseph Walton	6,744	59.7	+0.3
Conservative	James Blyth	3,454	30.6	−10.0
Ind. Labour Party	Pete Curran	1,091	9.7	New
Majority		3,290	29.1	+10.3
Turnout		11,289	76.3	−4.6
Liberal hold		Swing	+5.2	

== Previous election ==
General election 1895: Barnsley
Party	Candidate	Votes	%	±%
Liberal	Earl Compton	6,820	59.4	−6.4
Conservative	Ronald Greville	4,653	40.6	+6.4
Majority		2,167	18.8	−12.8
Turnout		11,473	80.9	+5.9
Liberal hold		Swing	-6.4	
