= Howard baronets =

Set index for Howard baronets

There have been two baronetcies created for persons with the surname Howard, both in the Baronetage of the United Kingdom. One creation is extant.

- Howard baronets of Bushey Park (1838): see Sir Ralph Howard, 1st Baronet (1801–1873)
- Howard baronets of Great Rissington (1955)
