= William Compton =

William Compton may refer to:

- William Compton (fl. 1416), MP for Nottinghamshire
- William Compton (courtier) (1482–1528), courtier to Henry VIII
  - William Compton (The Tudors), a fictionalized portrayal in The Tudors
- William Compton, 1st Earl of Northampton (died 1630), English peer
- William Compton (army officer) (1625–1663), Royalist army officer
- William Compton, 4th Marquess of Northampton (1818–1897), British peer and naval commander
- William Compton, 5th Marquess of Northampton (1851–1913), British peer and Liberal politician
- William Compton, 6th Marquess of Northampton (1885–1978), British peer and soldier
- William Edward Compton (1945–1977), American radio personality
- Will Compton (born 1989), American football linebacker
- Bill Compton (1945–2007), mental health advocate
- Bill Compton (The Southern Vampire Mysteries), a love interest of Sookie Stackhouse in the Southern Vampire series by Charlaine Harris and its television adaptation True Blood
- Several Compton baronets

== See also ==
- Compton (surname)
- William Crompton (disambiguation)
