= Lady Emily Compton =

British fashion personality (born 1980)

- Born: Lady Emily Rose Compton; 1980 (age 45–46)
- Noble family: Compton
- Spouse: Edward M. J. Horner
- Issue: Avia Rose Horner; Maximilian Spencer Horner
- Father: Spencer Compton, 7th Marquess of Northampton
- Mother: Rosemary Hancock
- Occupation: Stylist; magazine editor; model; jewellery designer

Lady Emily Rose Compton (born 1980) is a British fashion stylist, magazine editor, jewellery designer, and model.

== Biography ==
Compton was born in 1980 to Spencer Compton, 7th Marquess of Northampton and his third wife, Rosemary Ashley Morritt Hancock. She is the third child and second daughter of the Lord Northampton. She grew up at Castle Ashby House, her family's ancestral home in Northamptonshire. She attended Westonbirt School.

After finishing school, she spent a gap year in South America before working at Ronnie Wood's London gallery. While working in London, she was discovered by the photographer Koto Bolofo. He photographed her for Vogue at her family's castle. She was signed with Isis Management and studied under photographer Arthur Elgort. She has appeared in spreads in Harper's Bazaar, GQ, and Interview.

She worked as a social editor, and later as a contributing editor, at Tatler. In 2019 she collaborated with Pragnell and Olivia Buckingham to create a jewellery line called Rockchic.

== Personal life ==
In 2002, she was in a relationship with singer Bryan Ferry of Roxy Music.

Compton is married to British financier Edward Horner.
