= Freemasonry in North Macedonia =

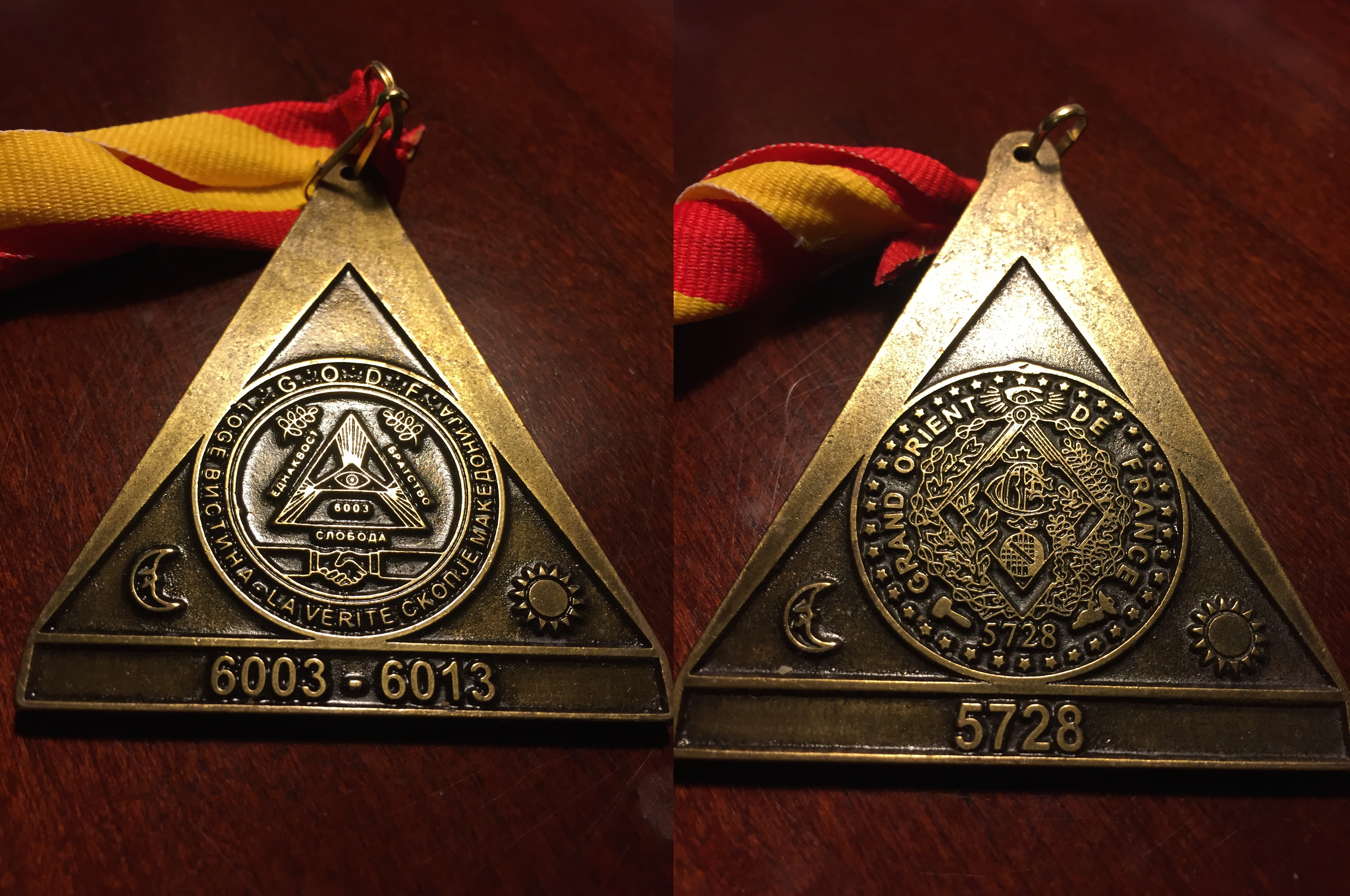
A masonic medallion issued by the Masonic Lodge "Vistina - La Verite" in Skopje, North Macedonia. The lodge is under the jurisdiction of the Grand Orient of France.

Freemasonry in North Macedonia (Macedonian: Слободно ѕидарство во Северна Македонија, romanized: Slobodno dzidarstvo vo Severna Makedonija) re-emerged in the 1990s, after the collapse of communism in South Eastern Europe.

Today, there are five bodies of Freemasonry represented in North Macedonia:

- Grand Lodge of Macedonia (in amity with UGLE)
- Grand Orient de France in North Macedonia, Lodge "Вистина - La Vérité" (under GODF)
- Grand Lodge Makedon
- Grand Lodge of Freemasonry for Men and Women in North Macedonia (Co-Freemasonry)
- Regular Grand Lodge of Macedonia (independent)
