= Mathew Grove =

Mathew Grove (fl. 1587), was an English poet.

Grove is known only as the author of the very rare volume entitled 'The most famous and tragicall historie of Pelops and Hippodamia. Whereunto are adioyned sundrie pleasant deuises, epigrams, songes, and sonnettes. Written by Mathew Grove. Imprinted at London by Abel Ieffs . . . 1587.' There are dedications in verse by Richard Smith, the publisher, who confesses to knowing nothing of the author, and in prose by the author, both addressed to Sir Henry Compton, 1st Baron Compton, father of William Compton, 1st Earl of Northampton. The story of Pelops and Hippodamia is told in ballad metre. There follow many short pieces, chiefly dealing with a lover's joys and pains, and a few epigrams on moral subjects. There are some jesting verses entitled 'A perfect tricke to kill little blacke flees in one's chamber.' Only one copy of the volume is known; it is in the library of the Earl of Ellesmere. Dr. Grosart reprinted it in his 'Occasional Issues' in 1878.

In 1638, Henry Gosson published a work by one Mathew Grove, entitled Witty Proverbs, Pithy Sentences, and wise similes collected out of the Golden volumes of divers learned and grave philosophers, London, 8vo. William Carew Hazlitt was of the opinion that this author is to be distinguished from the writer of 'Pelops'.
