= Castle Ashby =

Village and civil parish in England

Coordinates: 52.2271°N 0.7417°W

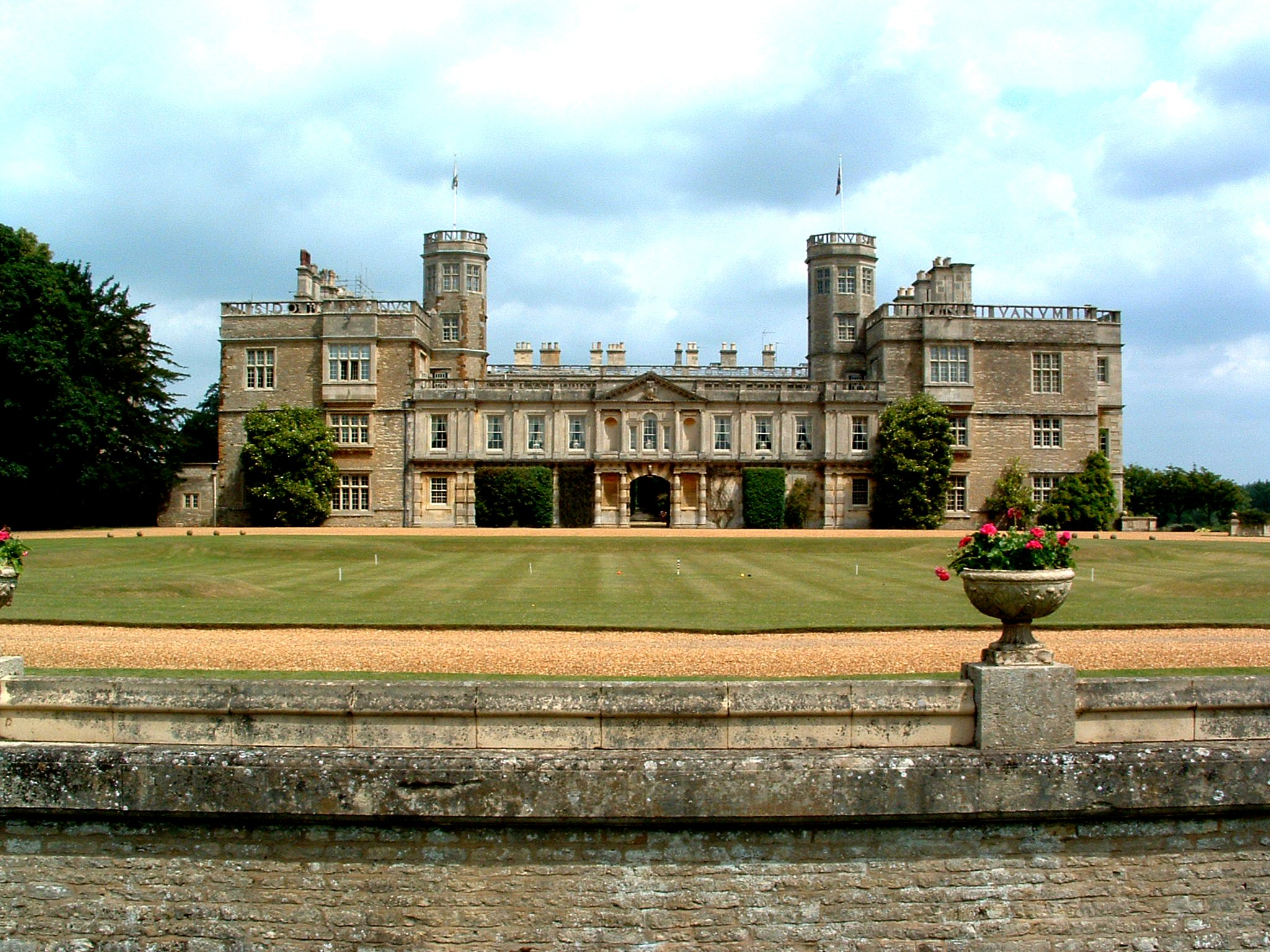
- South elevation of Castle Ashby house

- Location within Northamptonshire
- Population: 111 (2011 Census)
- OS grid reference: SP8659
  - London: 65 miles (105 km) SSE
- Civil parish: Castle Ashby
- Unitary authority: West Northamptonshire
- Ceremonial county: Northamptonshire
- Region: East Midlands
- Country: England
- Sovereign state: United Kingdom
- Post town: NORTHAMPTON
- Postcode district: NN7
- Dialling code: 01604
- Police: Northamptonshire
- Fire: Northamptonshire
- Ambulance: East Midlands
- UK Parliament: Northampton South

Castle Ashby is a village and civil parish in the West Northamptonshire unitary authority area of Northamptonshire, England. At the 2011 Census, the population of the parish (including Chadstone) was 111.

Historically, the village was set up to service the needs of Castle Ashby House, the seat of the Marquess of Northampton. The village has one small "Health Retreat", The Falcon. The village contains many houses rebuilt from the 1860s onwards. These include work by the architect E.F. Law of Northampton, whose work can also be seen nearby at Horton Church. The castle is the result of a licence obtained in 1306, for Walter Langton, Bishop of Coventry and Lichfield, to castellate his mansion in the village of Ashby.

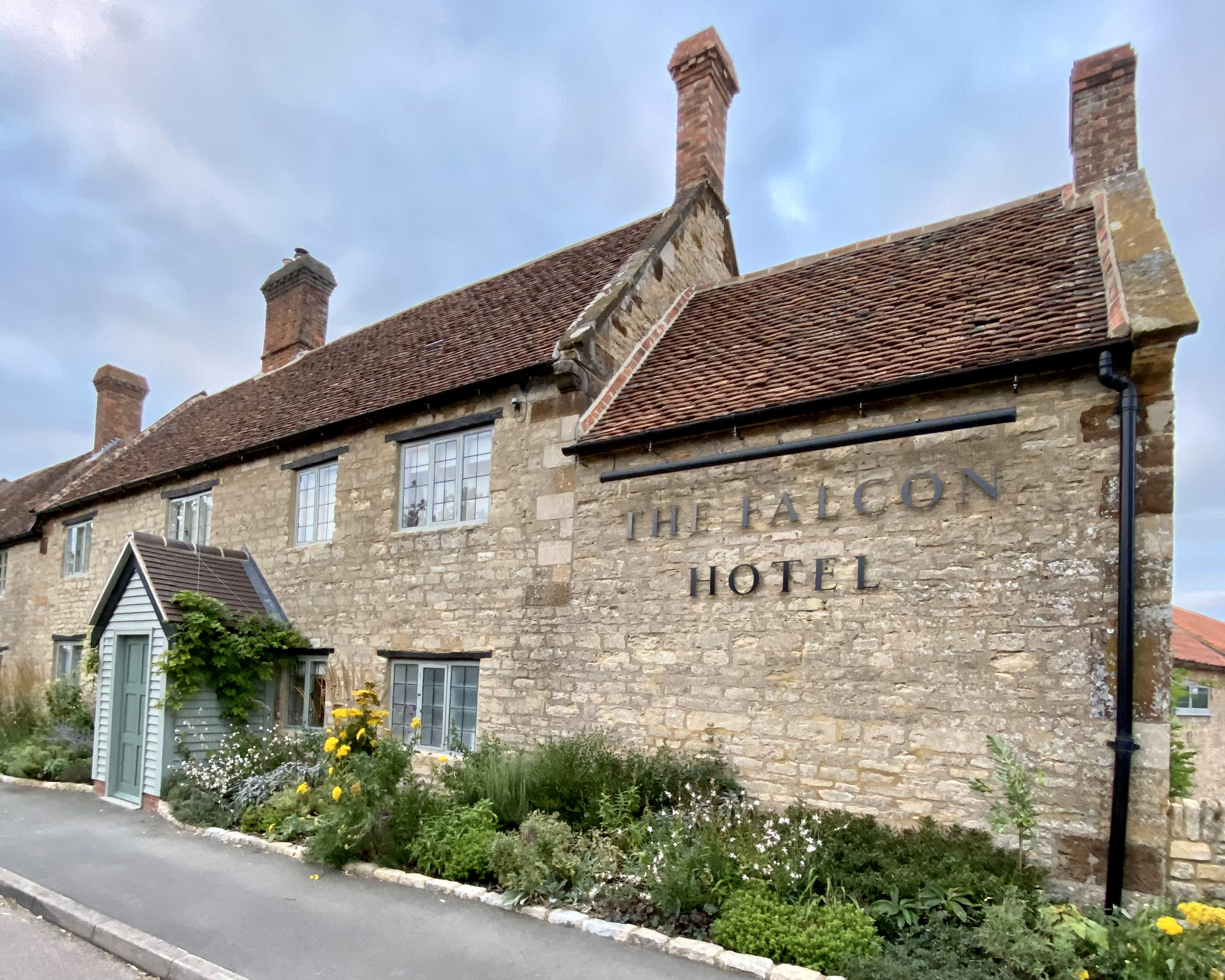
The Falcon Hotel

The village's name means 'Ash-tree farm/settlement'. There was a castle here, later replaced by the Elizabethan mansion.

== See also ==
- Compton Wynyates
