= Candleshoe =

1977 live action family film directed by Norman Tokar

- Theatrical release poster
- Directed by: Norman Tokar
- Screenplay by: David Swift; Rosemary Anne Sisson
- Based on: Christmas at Candleshoe (1953) by Michael Innes
- Produced by: Ron Miller
- Starring: Jodie Foster; David Niven; Helen Hayes; Leo McKern; Vivian Pickles
- Cinematography: Paul Beeson
- Edited by: Peter Boita
- Music by: Ron Goodwin
- Production company: Walt Disney Productions
- Distributed by: Buena Vista Distribution
- Release date: December 16, 1977
- Running time: 101 minutes
- Country: United States
- Language: English

Candleshoe is a 1977 American children's adventure comedy film, directed by Norman Tokar in a screenplay by David Swift and Rosemary Anne Sisson, produced by Walt Disney Productions, and distributed by Buena Vista. The film stars Jodie Foster, David Niven, Helen Hayes (in her final film role), and Leo McKern.

== Plot ==
Con-artist Harry Bundage believes that the lost treasure of pirate Captain Joshua St. Edmund is hidden at Candleshoe, the large country estate of Lady St. Edmund. Thanks to Harry's cousin Clara, a corrupt former cleaning woman at Candleshoe, Harry has the captain's first clue. Harry recruits street‑smart American foster child Casey Brown, employing her to pose as Lady St. Edmund's granddaughter, the Honourable Margaret, 4th Marchioness of Candleshoe, who disappeared ten years ago at age four. Casey is the right age to pass for the long‑lost Margaret and possesses two identifying scars that young Margaret was known to have. Casey agrees to go along with the con and discover further clues in exchange for a cut of the profits.

Arriving at Candleshoe, Casey finds that Lady St. Edmund is living in genteel poverty, and that Candleshoe itself is constantly on the verge of being unable to pay its taxes. Priory, the estate's butler (who is forced to pose as various members of the household to conceal that all the other servants have been let go) manages to keep one step ahead of foreclosure by pawning the house's antiques, conducting tours of the estate, and selling produce at market. Four local orphans adopted by Lady St. Edmund assist Priory.

Casey eventually becomes part of the family and decides to find the treasure for the benefit of Candleshoe, rather than for Harry. This nearly costs the girl her life when she is seriously injured trying to prevent Harry from stealing money from Lady St. Edmund. Casey, now unconscious with a severe concussion, is taken to a hospital, and remains there for several days. Meanwhile, without the money Harry has stolen, Candleshoe is unable to pay its taxes and is within days of foreclosure. When Casey learns that Lady St. Edmund is preparing to go to a retirement home and send the children back to the orphanage, she breaks down and tells them about the treasure. After unraveling the final clue together, the household returns to Candleshoe to find Harry and his crew tearing the place apart to find the hidden treasure. Casey, Priory, and the children manage to fight off the thieves until the police arrive, inadvertently discovering the treasure in the process.

With Candleshoe safe and her scheme discovered, Casey, feeling she has no right to stay, prepares to return to Los Angeles, but is stopped by Lady St. Edmund, who offers her a real home at Candleshoe. Casey expresses doubt, wondering what will happen if Lady St. Edmund's real granddaughter ever returns, but she is eventually persuaded to return to Candleshoe, with Lady St. Edmund saying that "perhaps she" is her real granddaughter after all.

Four clues were revealed in the hunt for the treasure:

- "For the sunrise student there is treasure among books". Refers to a message in a stained‑glass window that can only be seen in the Candleshoe library at sunrise.
- "The paths of glory lead but to the grave". Refers to the poem "Elegy Written in a Country Churchyard" by Thomas Gray.
- "He followed the eclipse for riches and fame; and, if ye would prosper, do ye the same". Refers to a painting of Captain St. Edmund's ship, the Eclipse.
- "Underfoot, in the great hall. Look high, look low, discover all". Refers to a statue of Captain St. Edmund in Candleshoe's great hall. The statue's foot is propped on a chest containing the hidden treasure.

== Cast ==
- Jodie Foster as Casey Brown
- David Niven as Priory
- Helen Hayes as Lady Gwendolyn St. Edmund
- Leo McKern as Harry Bundage
- Vivian Pickles as Clara Grimsworthy
- Veronica Quilligan as Cluny
- Ian Sharrock as Peter
- Sarah Tamakuni as Anna
- David Samuels as Bobby
- John Alderson as Jenkins
- Mildred Shay as Mrs. McCress, Casey’s Foster Mother
- Michael Balfour as Mr. McCress, Casey’s Foster Father
- Sydney Bromley as Mr. Thresher
- Michael Segal as Train Guard

This was the last film Foster was obliged to make under her contract with Disney.

== Location ==
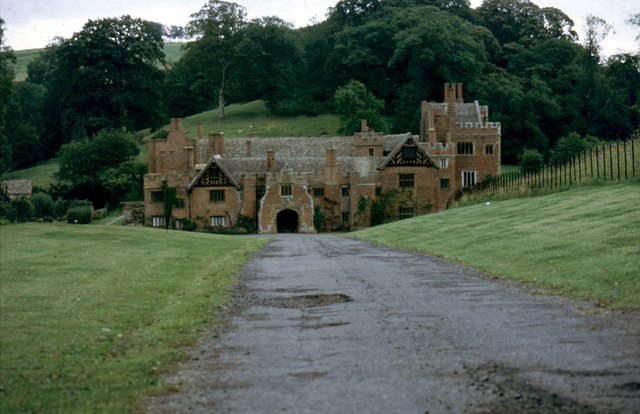
Compton Wynyates, the main filming location.

Compton Wynyates in Warwickshire, then home to William Compton, 6th Marquess of Northampton, posed as the fictional estate of Candleshoe.

The Severn Valley Railway that runs between the midland towns of Bridgnorth and Kidderminister in the United Kingdom was used as a location in the film.

== Music ==
In September 2015, Intrada Records released a special edition of the soundtrack containing the entire score from the film plus bonus material, including alternate takes of some tracks.

== Reception ==
Metacritic gave the film a 68% score.

== Release ==
While Candleshoe had its theatrical debut in 1977, seven more years passed before the movie premiered on the Disney Channel in February 1984. The movie was subsequently released for home video twice in VHS format which occurred sometime in the mid-1980s and early 1990s. While the former's date is not known, the re-release came on January 24, 1992. Candleshoe was released in DVD format twice as well, occurring on September 14, 1999 by Anchor Bay Entertainment and on June 1, 2004 by Disney.

== See also ==
- Crooks and Coronets (1969)
- Fitzwilly (1967)
- Anastasia (1997)
- Herbie Rides Again (1974)
