= William Compton (courtier) =

English soldier and courtier (1482–1528)

Sir William Compton
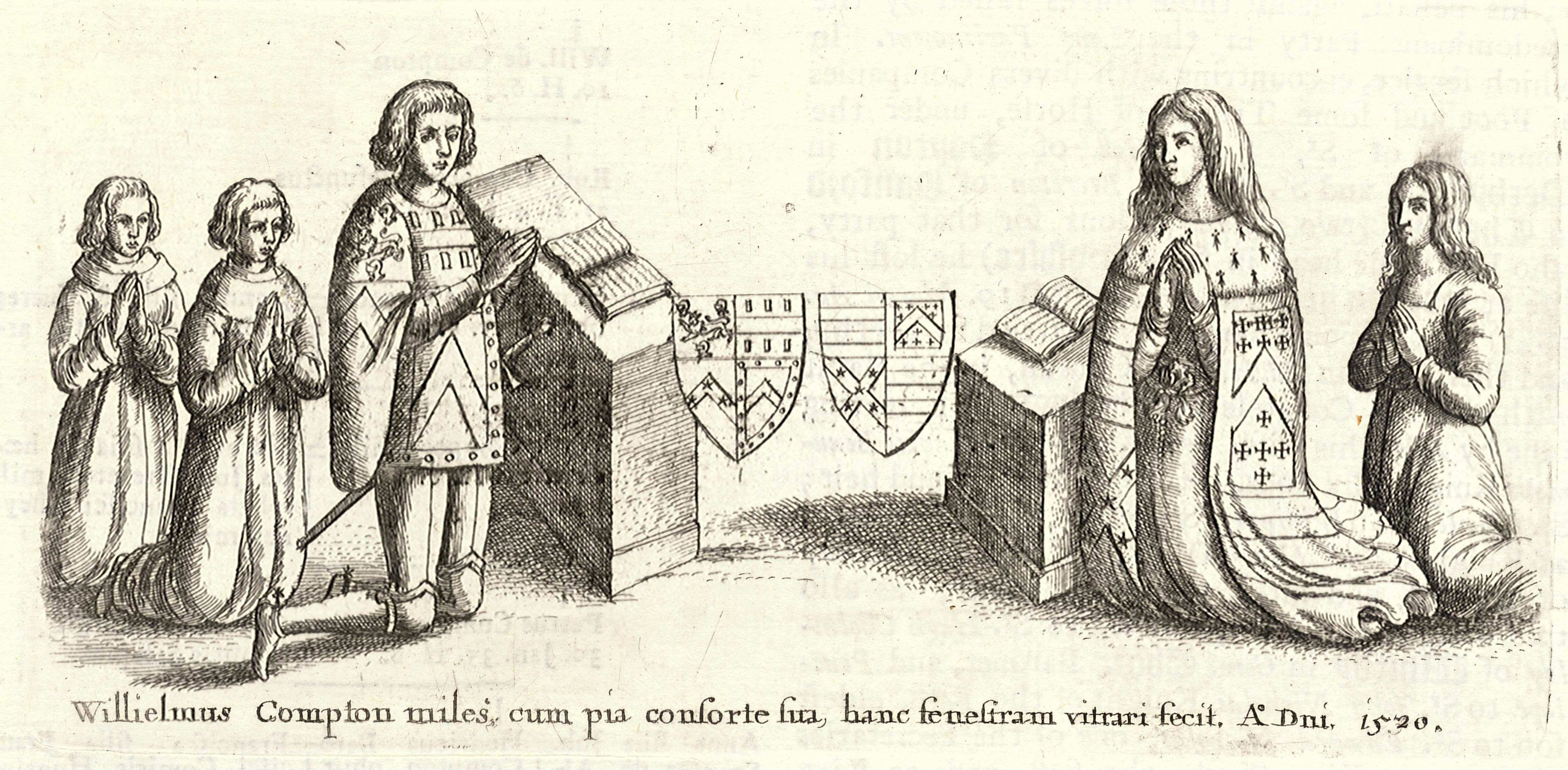
- Sir William Compton and his 1st wife, engraving by Wenceslaus Hollar
- Born: William Compton c. 1482; Compton, Warwickshire, England
- Died: 30 June 1528 (aged 45–46)
- Resting place: Compton Wynyates, Warwickshire, England; 52.073980°N 1.518650°W
- Occupations: Soldier and courtier
- Spouses: Werburga Brereton (m. 1512; died 1525) Elizabeth Stonor (after 1525)
- Children: Peter Compton; Mary Compton
- Parents: Edmund Compton; Joan Aylworth

Arms of Compton: Sable, a Lion passant guardant Or between three Esquire's Helmets Argent

Sir William Compton (c. 1482 – 30 June 1528) was a soldier and one of the most prominent courtiers during the reign of Henry VIII of England.

== Family and early life ==
Compton was born around 1482, the only son and heir of Edmund Compton (d. 21 April 1493) of Compton, Warwickshire and Joan, the daughter of Walter Aylworth. He was around eleven years of age when his father died in 1493, at which time he became a ward of Henry VII, who appointed him page to Prince Henry, Duke of York. He was about nine years older than Henry, but the two became close friends.

== Marriage and issue ==
He married firstly, before 10 May 1512, Werburga (1488–1525), the daughter of Sir John Brereton and Katherine Berkeley (d. 1494), and widow of Sir Francis Cheyne. They had two sons and a daughter, including:

- Peter Compton (1523 – 1544), the eldest son and heir, aged six at his father's death, became the ward of cardinal Thomas Wolsey. He married Anne, daughter of George Talbot, 4th Earl of Shrewsbury and by her, had a son, Henry who was created Baron Compton by Elizabeth I. Henry's son, William was made Earl of Northampton by James I.
- Mary Compton (b. 1522). Princess Mary stood godmother to the infant daughter of Sir William Compton in February 1522.

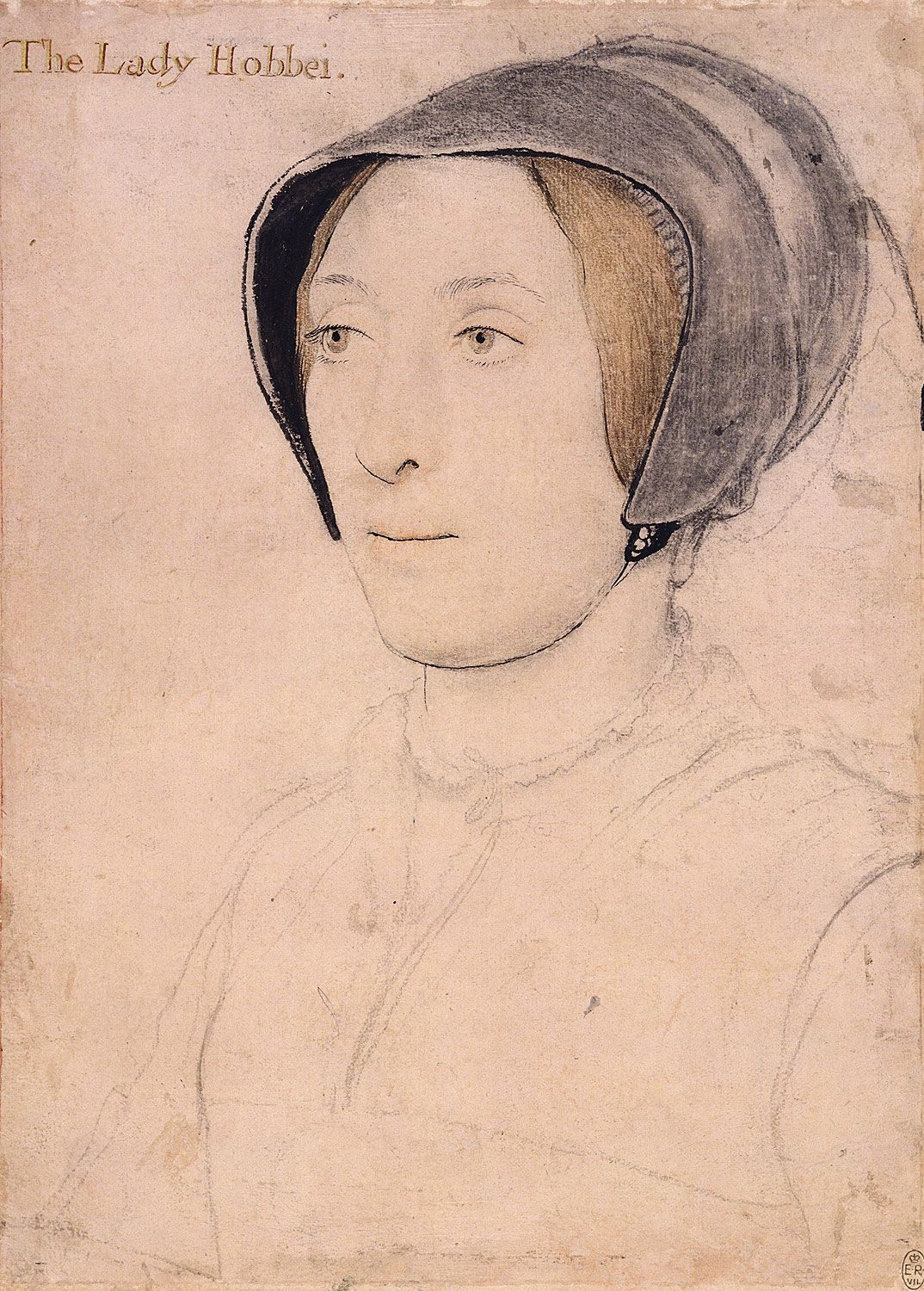
Elizabeth Stonor, 2nd wife of Sir William Compton, subsequently married Walter Walshe, then Sir Philip Hoby, c. 1532–1543, by Hans Holbein the Younger

He married secondly, about 1525, Elizabeth Stonor, the daughter of Sir Walter Stonor and by her had at least one child.

== Career ==
On Henry's accession in 1509, he was given the position of Groom of the Stool, the man who was in closest contact with the young king. The Groom waited on the king while he used the latrine or close stool, and was also in charge of linen and the King's clothes, jewels and tableware. Compton made lists of Henry's jewels.

One of his duties, according to the courtier Elizabeth Amadas, was to procure women for his monarch and arrange trysts with them at his London home, in Thames Street. Compton was also the steward, or administrator, of several royal manors.

Compton was knighted 25 September 1513 at Tournai, following the Battle of the Spurs. He had been able to muster 578 soldiers for the campaign in France from the manors he stewarded, almost as many as all the other members of the Privy chamber raised in total. In 1521 he was present at Henry VIII's meeting with Francis I at the Field of the Cloth of Gold and at Gravelines for the king's interview with Charles V. Compton served on the Scottish borders under the Earl of Surrey in 1523, and this appears to have been the only time he was far from the court. It was thought that his rival Thomas Wolsey contrived his being sent there, hoping to diminish his influence over the king.

Although he was not a politician, Compton ultimately acquired significant influence over Henry when it came to granting land and favours to the aristocracy, and made a fortune himself. The offices he held included:

- Groom of the Bedchamber
- Chief Gentleman of the Bedchamber
- Chief Ranger of Windsor Great Park
- Groom of the Stool 1510–1526
- Constable of Gloucester Castle
- Constable of Sudeley Castle
- Constable of Warwick Castle
- Chancellor of Ireland, 1513–1516
- Usher of the Black Rod, 4 February 1513–1526
- Sheriff of Hampshire, 1512–1513
- Sheriff of Somersetshire and Dorsetshire, 1513–1514
- High Sheriff of Worcestershire, 1516 to 1528
- Under-treasurer of the Exchequer, 1525

== Anne Stafford ==
In 1510, Compton was involved in a public row with Edward Stafford, 3rd Duke of Buckingham over Henry's affair with the Duke's married sister, Lady Anne Hastings. Around 1519, Compton became involved with Anne himself. In 1521, Henry sent Compton to arrest Anne's brother, the Duke of Buckingham, who was later executed for treason.

== Death ==
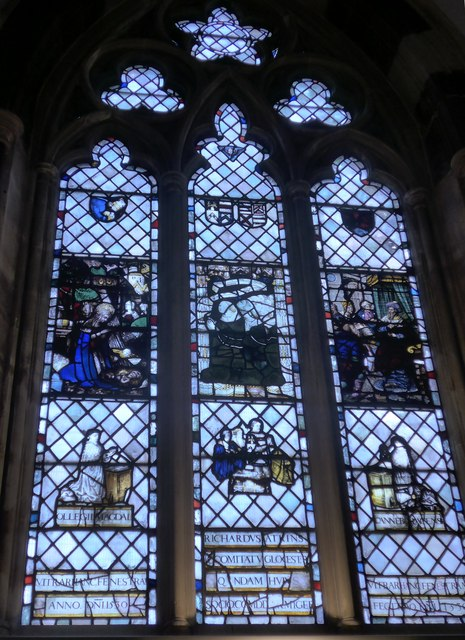
Chapel window, Balliol College, Oxford. Compton is depicted bottom centre.

In his will, which was dated 8 March 1523, Compton made provisions for Lady Hastings, his first wife, Werburga and his children. His will was made while his first wife was still living and not updated to provide for his second wife, Elizabeth, who was expecting a child at the time of his death. He died 30 June 1528 of the sweating sickness which killed several courtiers including Anne Boleyn's brother-in-law, William Carey. He was buried in the chapel at Compton Wynyates. Compton was depicted in stained glass in the chapel at Compton Wynyates and at Balliol College in Oxford.

His widow, Elizabeth, was still attempting to claim her jointure at the time of her second marriage to Walter Walshe, a page of the Privy chamber in November 1529, and the matter had not been resolved by June 1538, when her father wrote to Thomas Cromwell on his daughter's behalf: "We both desire your Lordship's favour in her causes, else she is like to be wronged".

== Fictional portrayals ==
A fictionalized William Compton was portrayed by Kris Holden-Ried in 2007 on the Showtime television series The Tudors, loosely based upon the reign of Henry VIII. He was portrayed by Luke Mullins in 2019 on the Starz television series The Spanish Princess, loosely based upon the life of Catherine of Aragon.
