= William Crompton =

William Crompton may refer to:

- William Crompton (politician) (1811–1886), New Zealand politician
- William Crompton (inventor) (1806–1891), loom technology inventor

== See also ==
- Bill Crawford-Crompton
- William Compton (disambiguation)
