= Olivia Buckingham =

British fashion personality (born 1983)

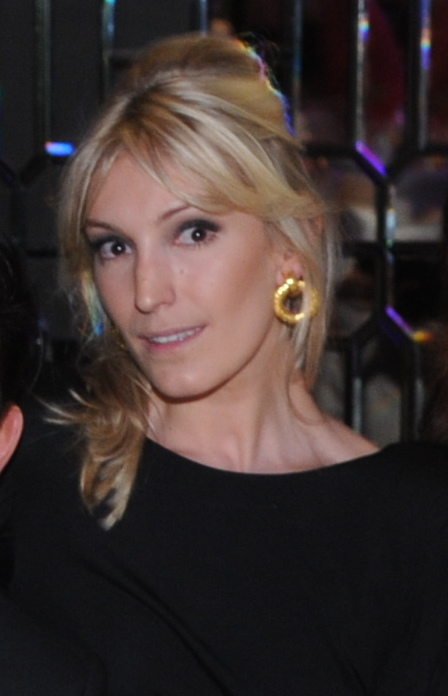
- Buckingham in 2011
- Born: 1983 (age 42–43); British Hong Kong
- Education: Heathfield School; London School of Fine Arts
- Occupations: Photographer, editor, designer

Olivia Croucher Buckingham (born 1983) is a Hong Kong-born British socialite, magazine editor, and former photographer. She is a contributing editor to Hong Kong Tatler and Thailand Tatler.

== Biography ==
Buckingham was born in Hong Kong in 1983. Her family has been in Hong Kong for four generations. Her maternal great-grandfather was the philanthropist and businessman Noel Croucher.

She boarded at Heathfield School, Ascot and studied photography at the London School of Fine Arts.

== Career ==
Buckingham worked as a portrait and landscape photographer, with her first exhibit shown at China Tang in London. She later began working for a public relations firm but left the public relations job to become a fashion stylist. Buckingham is a contributing editor to Hong Kong Tatler and Thailand Tatler. In 2019 she partnered with Lady Emily Compton to release a jewellery collection called RockChic. She also partnered with Lady Emily to launch Emily & Olivia, a styling service.

She was named number six on Tatler's 2023 best dressed list.
