= Spencer Compton, 7th Marquess of Northampton =

British noble (born 1946)

The Most Honourable The Marquess of Northampton
- Coat of Arms of the Marquess of Northampton
- Born: Spencer Douglas David Compton; 2 April 1946 (age 80)
- Education: Eton College
- Known for: Pro Grand Master of the United Grand Lodge of England
- Title: 7th Marquess of Northampton
- Predecessor: William Compton
- Spouses: Baroness Henriette Bentinck (m. 1967; div. 1973) Annette Smallwood (m. 1974; div. 1977) Rosemary Dawson-Damer (m. 1977; div. 1983) Ellen Erhardt (m. 1985; div. 1988) Pamela Kyprios (m. 1990; div. 2013) Tracy Goodman (m. 2013)
- Children: Lady Lara Compton; Daniel Compton, Earl Compton; Lady Emily Compton; Lady Louisa Compton

Spencer "Spenny" Douglas David Compton, 7th Marquess of Northampton (born 2 April 1946) is a British peer.

He was listed as having properties worth £120 million in the 2011 Estates Gazette Rich List. In the Sunday Times Rich List 2017, ranking the wealthiest people in the UK, he was listed with an estimated fortune of £110million. In 1985 he sold Adoration of the Magi by Andrea Mantegna at Christie's in London to the J. Paul Getty Museum for a then-world record auction price of $10.5 million (£8.1m). In November 1993, the New York Supreme Court, Appellate Division confirmed his claim to the ownership of the Sevso Treasure, a hoard of late Roman Empire silver. The hoard was later purchased by Hungary (who claims it has been repatriated, although Yugoslavia, later Croatia, and Lebanon claimed it at the time of the court case) in two phases, first in 2014 and second in 2017.

He is a Freemason, and served as the Pro Grand Master of the United Grand Lodge of England from 2001 until March 2009.

== Family ==
Compton is the son of William Compton, 6th Marquess of Northampton and Virginia Lucie Compton, née Heaton. The family seats are Castle Ashby House and Compton Wynyates.

The heir apparent to the marquessate and its subsidiary titles is Northampton's only son Daniel, Earl Compton (b. 1973). The heir apparent's heir apparent is his son, Henry Douglas Hungerford Compton, Lord Wilmington (born 2018).

== Personal life ==
He has been married six times. On 13 June 1967, Compton married Henriette Luisa Maria Bentinck, daughter of Adolph Willem Carel Baron Bentinck and Gabrielle Baronin Thyssen-Bornemisza de Kaszon. The couple had two children and divorced in 1973.

- Lady Lara Katrina Compton (b. 26 April 1968)
- Daniel Bingham Compton, Earl Compton (b. 16 January 1973)

The next year, in 1974, Compton married Annette Marie Smallwood; they divorced in 1977. Later that year, he married Rosemary Ashley Morrit Hancock, who had previously been married to Hon. Lionel Dawson-Damer. They had one child before divorcing in 1983.

- Lady Emily Rose Compton (b. 1980)

On 12 January 1985, he married Hannelore Ellen (née Erhardt), who had previously been married to Michael Pearson, 4th Viscount Cowdray. Compton and Erhardt had one child and divorced in 1988.

- Lady Louisa Cecilia Compton (b. 1985)

On 10 December 1990, he married Pamela Martina Raphaela (née Haworth), who had previously been married to Emanuel Kyprios. They divorced in January 2013. Later that same year, on 4 September 2013 in London, he married Tracy Goodman, to whom he has remained married.

== Arms ==
Coat of arms of Spencer Compton, 7th Marquess of Northampton

Coronet
A Coronet of a Marquess
Crest
On a Mount a Beacon fired proper behind it a Riband inscribed with the words Nisi Dominus
Escutcheon
Sable a Lion passant guardant Or between three Esquires' Helmets Argent
Supporters
Dexter: a Dragon Ermine ducally gorged and chained Or; Sinister: a Unicorn Argent horned maned hoofed and tufted Sable
Motto
Je ne serche qu'un

== See also ==
- Sevso Treasure
- Northampton Sekhemka statue

Peerage of the United Kingdom
Preceded by William Compton	Marquess of Northampton; 2nd creation 1978 – present	Incumbent; Heir: Daniel Compton, Earl Compton
Orders of precedence in the United Kingdom
Preceded by The Marquess of Exeter	Gentlemen	Succeeded by The Marquess Camden
