= Grand Lodge of Macedonia =

Freemason lodge in North Macedonia

The Grand Lodge of Macedonia
- Seal of The Grand Lodge of Macedonia
- Established: 2005
- Location: North Macedonia; Skopje
- Region served: Macedonia
- Grand Master: Zhivko Gruevski
- Website: www.glm.org.mk

The Grand Lodge of Macedonia is a Grand Lodge for Freemasonry in the Republic of North Macedonia. Founded in 2005 by the United Grand Lodge of England, it is the only Regular Masonic jurisdiction in North Macedonia.

== English Masonry in North Macedonia ==
From 1996 onwards a number of Macedonian citizens were initiated into Freemasonry in London, with a view to establishing a regular Masonic lodge in the Macedonian capital, Skopje. They were active members of their London lodges, but were also authorised to hold a Lodge of Instruction in Skopje.

By the year 2000 the group numbered 23 individuals, several of whom were Past Masters, and arrangements were made for the consecration ceremony in Macedonia. Skopje Lodge was consecrated on 2 October 2000 by a team of officers from the United Grand Lodge of England (UGLE), assisted by the Grand Lodge of Austria. Skopje Lodge was assigned the warrant number 9721 on the UGLE register of lodges.

Having established regular Freemasonry, the UGLE representatives returned to consecrate two further lodges, namely Unity Lodge No 9749 consecrated on 8 February 2002, and White Dawns Lodge No 9765 consecrated on 20 June 2003. This brought the number of lodges to three, the internationally recognised minimum number of lodges which may constitute an independent national Grand Lodge (see "Basic Principles for Grand Lodge Recognition", published 4 September 1929 by the home Grand Lodges).

== Grand Lodge consecration ==
On Friday 30 September 2005 the Grand Lodge of Macedonia (GLM) was consecrated by the United Grand Lodge of England, with Spencer Compton, 7th Marquess of Northampton, Pro Grand Master, presiding as the consecrating officer.

Consecrations of foreign Grand Lodges by the United Grand Lodge of England are relatively unusual. Given the position of UGLE, the original Grand Lodge within world Freemasonry, official recognition of the new Macedonian Grand Lodge followed swiftly. Today the Grand Lodge of Macedonia is recognised by most of the world's regular Grand Lodges.

== Facilities ==
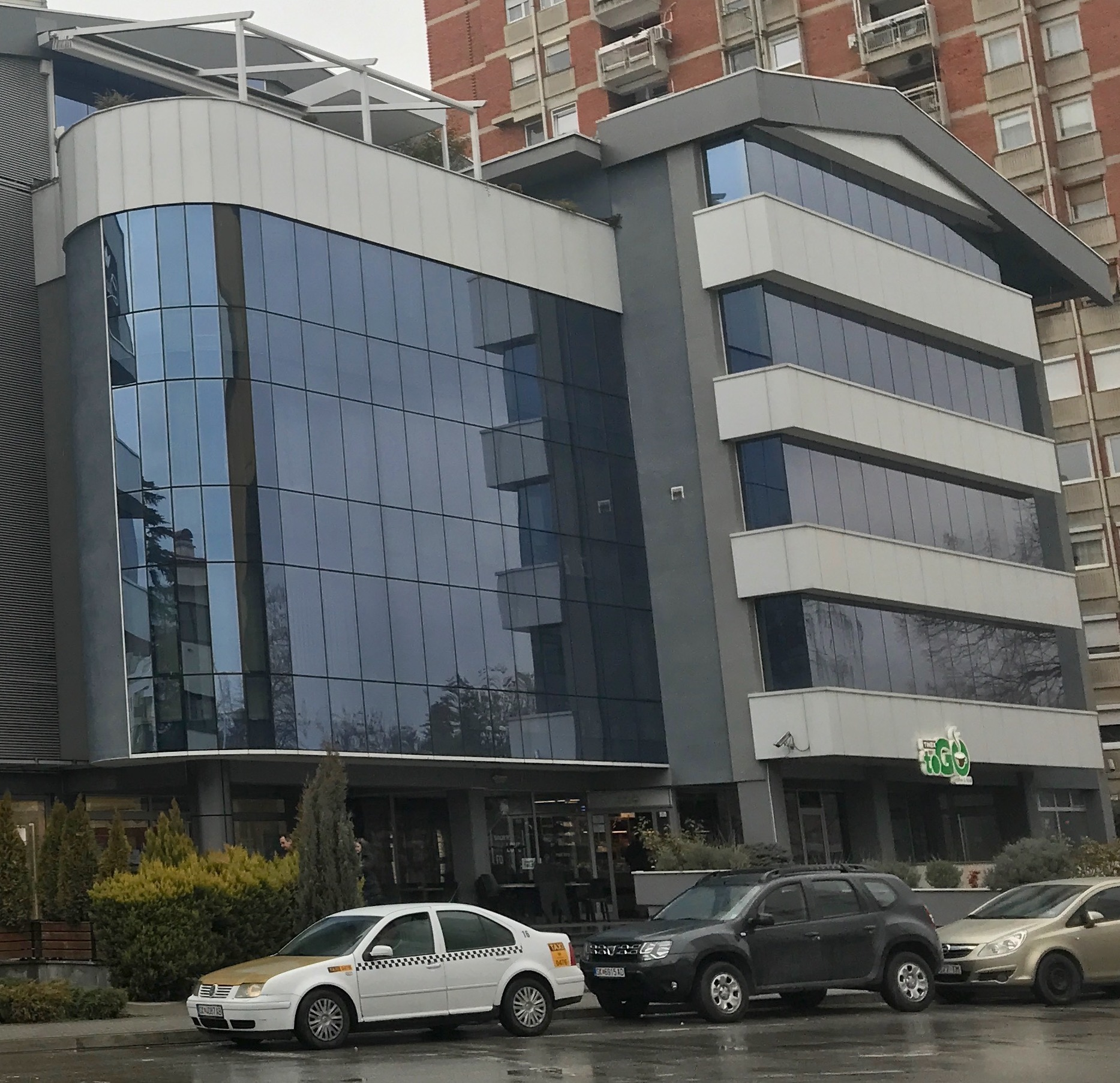
The Grand Lodge building in Skopje.

In its earliest days the GLM rented accommodation in the Cafe Jurist, Skopje. Later it was able to establish a permanent temple and offices at premises in Bitpazarska, although these were still rented. In 2009 the Grand Lodge moved to premises on Prashka Street, where more space was available, but continued expanding its building fund towards the aim of its own permanent headquarters.

An opportunity arose with the development of Skopje's Zebra Centre, a modern development incorporating a hotel, shopping precinct, offices, restaurants, and a multi-storey car park. Through careful negotiation and extensive fund-raising it became possible to construct an entire additional wing of the Zebra Centre as a Grand Lodge building, to be owned outright by the GLM. This building, which covers four storeys, includes a large masonic temple, administrative offices and board rooms, changing rooms, a masonic museum, a dining room and kitchens, and a masonic club open daily to members. The facility opened in 2012. A small part of the building is currently let commercially; in due course, as the need arises, it is planned to develop this part of the building into a second masonic temple, so that more than one lodge may meet simultaneously.

== Constituent lodges ==
The three lodges consecrated as part of the UGLE became the initial three lodges of the Grand Lodge of Macedonia. Their English warrant numbers have been retained in their names, whilst new Macedonian warrant numbers have been issued. Thus they have become: Skopje Lodge 9721, No 1; Unity Lodge 9749, No 2; and White Dawns Lodge 9765, No 3. Subsequently, new lodges numbered 4, 5, and 6 have been consecrated by the GLM. Lodge 1 works its ritual in the English language; all other Macedonian lodges work in Macedonian.

== Royal Arch ==
Macedonian Freemasonry follows the British and Commonwealth model, with "pure ancient Masonry" acknowledged to consist of the three degrees worked in lodges, plus the Holy Royal Arch degree, practiced in associated chapters. Although Craft Freemasonry has been independent since 2005, Royal Arch Freemasonry in Macedonia is still for the time being controlled from London.

== Rival body ==
A rival body named the Regular Grand Lodge of Macedonia was also established in Skopje, in 2010. Whilst it has some features of masonic regularity, it lacks international recognition, and is considered irregular and clandestine by the home Grand Lodges.
