= Castle Ashby House =

Country house in Northamptonshire, England

Castle Ashby
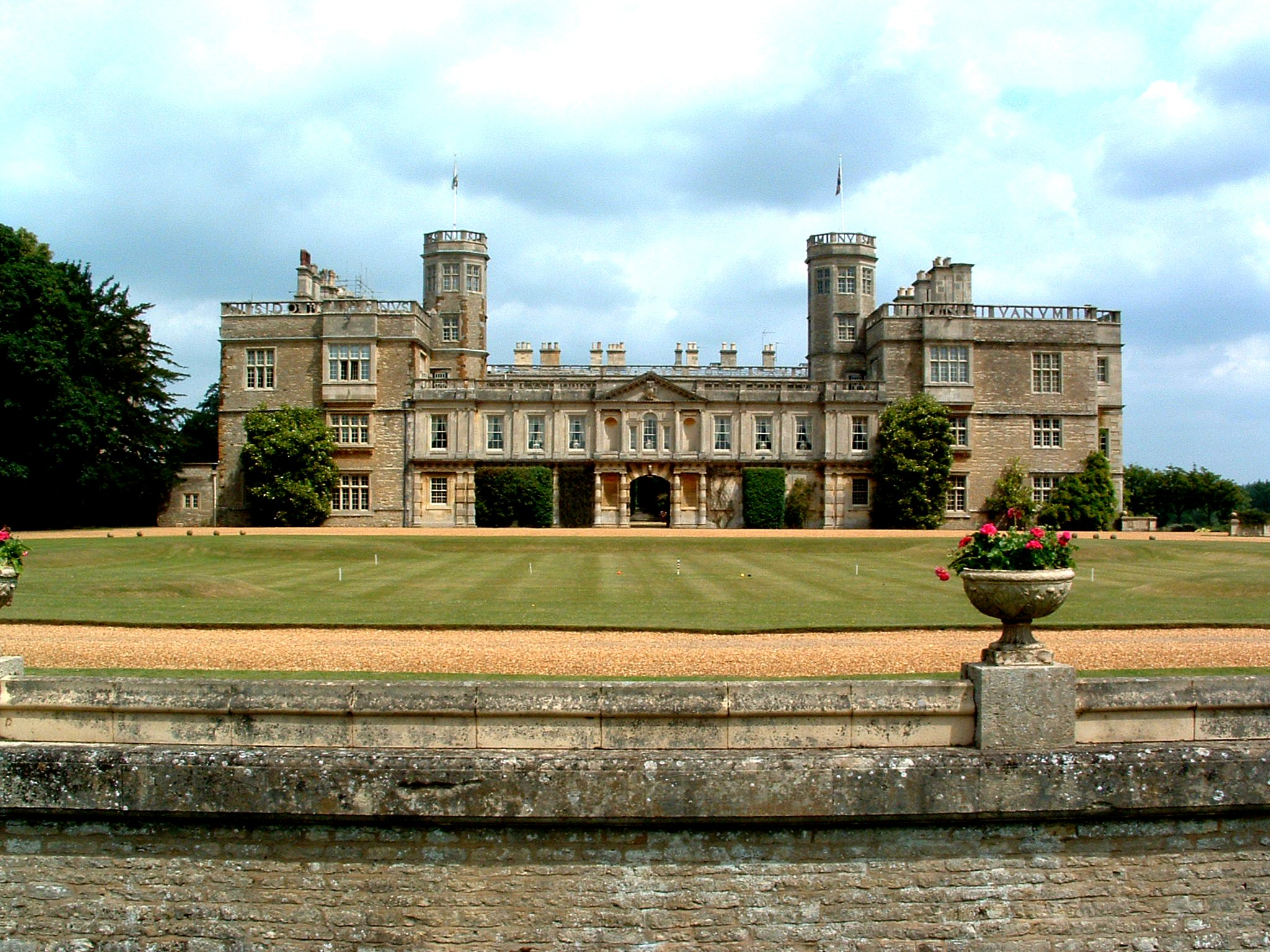
- The façade of Castle Ashby

- Location within Northamptonshire
- 52°13′28″N 0°44′19″W
- Type: Prodigy house
- Location: Castle Ashby, Northamptonshire

History
- Built: 1574-c.1600

Site notes
- Architectural style: Elizabethan
- Owner: Marquess of Northampton
- Website: castleashbygardens.co.uk

Listed Building – Grade I
- Official name: Castle Ashby
- Designated: 3 May 1968
- Reference no.: 1371298

National Register of Historic Parks and Gardens
- Official name: Castle Ashby
- Designated: 25 June 1984
- Reference no.: 1000385

Castle Ashby, often Castle Ashby House (to differentiate it from the parish) is a country house at Castle Ashby, Northamptonshire, England. It is one of the seats of the Marquess of Northampton. The house, church, formal gardens and landscaped park are Grade I listed.

The original castle, a manor house, came about as the result of a licence obtained in 1306 by Walter Langton, Bishop of Coventry and Lichfield, to castellate his mansion in the village of Ashby. Sir Gerard Braybroke was at one time of Castle Ashby Manor. It is a leading example of the Elizabethan prodigy house, with a Palladian section closing the front courtyard added in the 18th century.

== History ==
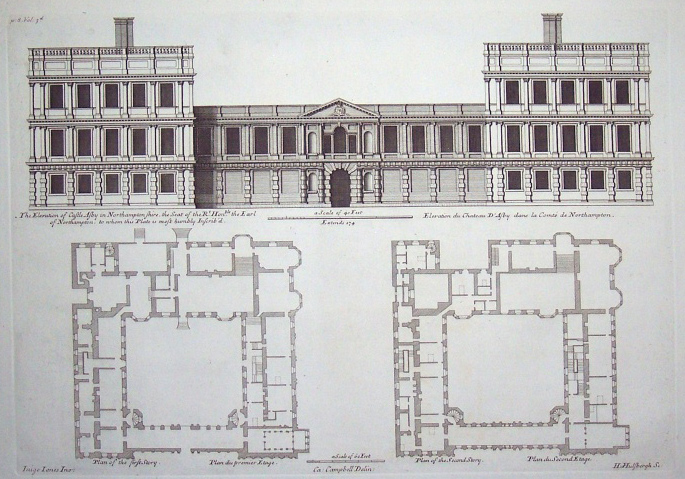
Elevation and ground floor (left) and first floor (right) plans. Key rooms include: great hall (top of courtyard, centre and right through both storeys); great chamber (top right on first floor); chapel (bottom right through both storeys); long gallery (bottom centre on first floor).

The present rebuilding of Castle Ashby was started by Henry Compton, 1st Baron Compton, in 1574 and was continued by his son William, created Earl of Northampton. Queen Elizabeth I's first visit to the house was in 1600. Like other houses of its time, it has an E-shaped floorplan, with a deep central porch and flight of steps forming the centre stroke of the E. This was to celebrate the coronation of Queen Elizabeth I. When King James and his Queen first stayed in 1605, the castle was documented as "Lord Compton's princely mansion", and in the household records we find that employed at this time were 83 household servants, four chaplains, three musicians and the Gardener of Ashby.

The parapet of stone lettering around the top of the house is dated 1624, and its Latin inscription is:

NISI DOMINUS CUSTOS CUSTODIVERIT DOMUM FRUSTRA
VIGILAT QUI CUSTODIT EAM: NISI DOMINUS AEDIFICAVERIT
DOMUM IN VANUM LABORAVERUNT QUI AEDIFICANT EAM

The words are based on the 127th Psalm, "Except the Lord build the house they labour but in vain they who build it; except the Lord keep the house the watchman waketh but in vain".

By 1635 an ambitious classicising screen had been added across the open southern side of the courtyard, probably to make the two wings directly accessible to each another; its design deviates enough from Palladian canons to make it unlikely that Inigo Jones designed it; Howard Colvin suggested that a payment of £8 to "Cartor Surveyor" in the Earl's accounts, September 1631, may refer to Edward Carter, Jones's deputy at St. Paul's Cathedral, 1633–41. Work proceeded at Castle Ashby until, as Colen Campbell the architect put it, "the Civil Wars put a stop to all Arts".

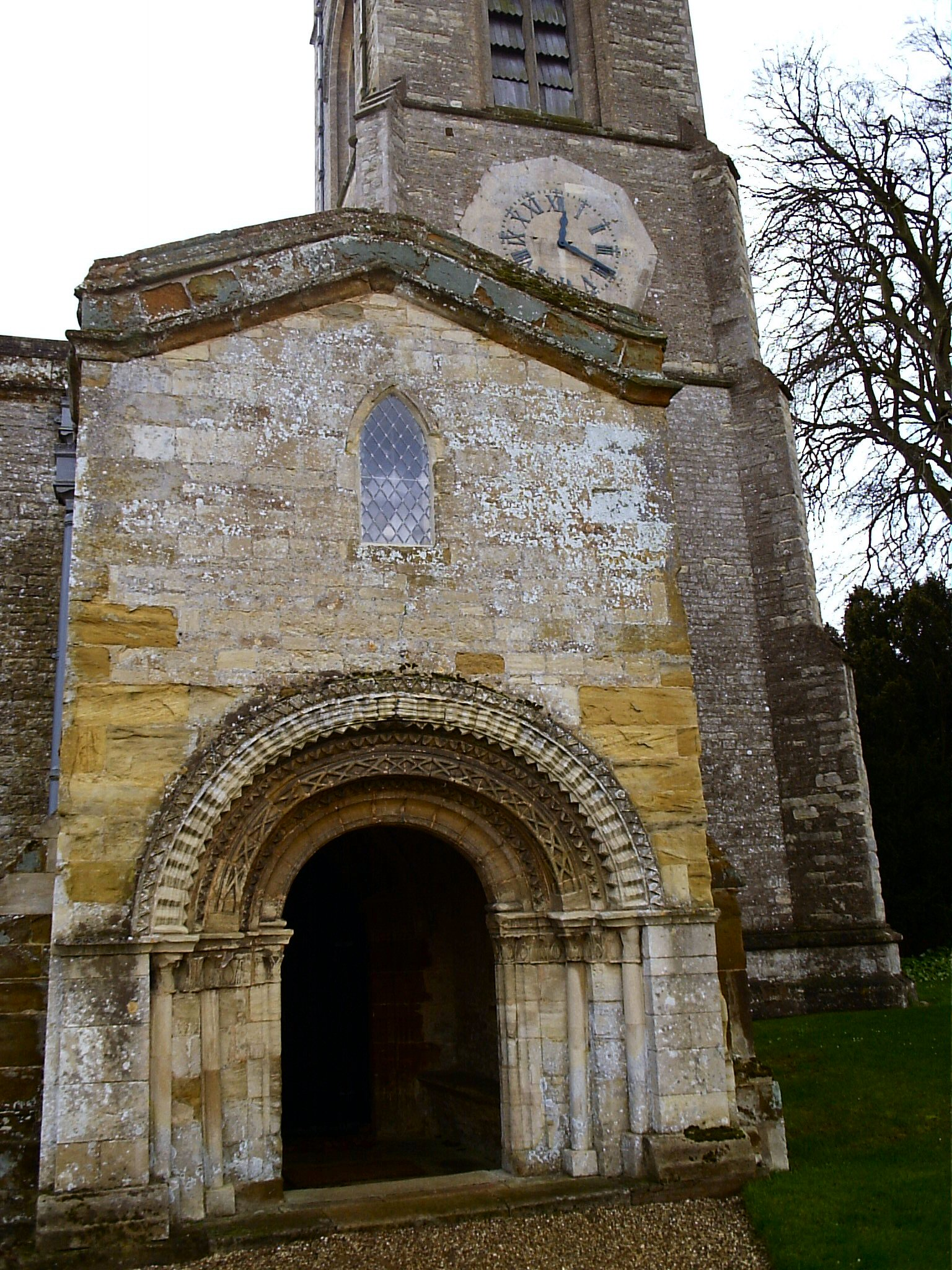
The Parvise at Castle Ashby

While the family was away fighting for the Royalist cause in the Civil War, the east side of the house was set on fire and severely damaged. The folklore is that an old woman known as Elspeth, who lived in the parvise over the north porch of the church, first noticed the blaze and alerted the village, thus saving the remainder of the house. The marks of the flames can still be clearly seen on the lintels of the windows. The contents of the house were looted and much damage inflicted on the estate by the Parliamentarians.

In October 1695, King William III visited the house and introduced the Dutch custom of planting avenues: not only to add to the importance of the house, but also to improve the outlook from its windows. Within a month of the visit, Lord Northampton began the planting of four avenues opposite each face of the house—something that took 25 years.

As a result of Capability Brown's "return to nature" approach 35 years later, only two of these avenues now remain. Brown, the architect and landscape gardener, was called in during 1760. Apart from "altering" the avenues into small clumps of trees and doing away with the Elizabethan gardens, he enlarged the ponds overlooked by the house into ornamental lakes, dug a ha-ha, or sunken fence, around the park and built the dairy and the temple against the menagerie. In 1771–74 the Great Hall was rebuilt for the 8th Earl by John Johnson.

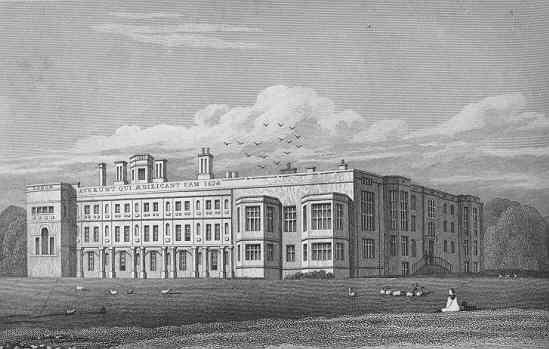
Castle Ashby (east front) from Jones' Views of the Seats of Noblemen and Gentlemen (1819)

It was not until the 1860s that any further substantial changes were carried out at the house, when Charles, the 3rd Marquess, and his wife brought in Sir Digby Wyatt, who made many changes to the interior of the house. Most of these were subsequently restored to their previous state by later generations who considered them ugly.

At this time the terraces round the house with their terracotta balustrading were laid out, and the Italian "golden gates" at the entrance to the front drive were hung on piers designed by Wyatt himself. However, before all the changes were carried out, Lady Northampton died of consumption, giving rise to the pitiful Latin inscription in terracotta lettering beside the church: "To Theodosia, sweetest of wives…Begun in hope, finished in despair 1865."

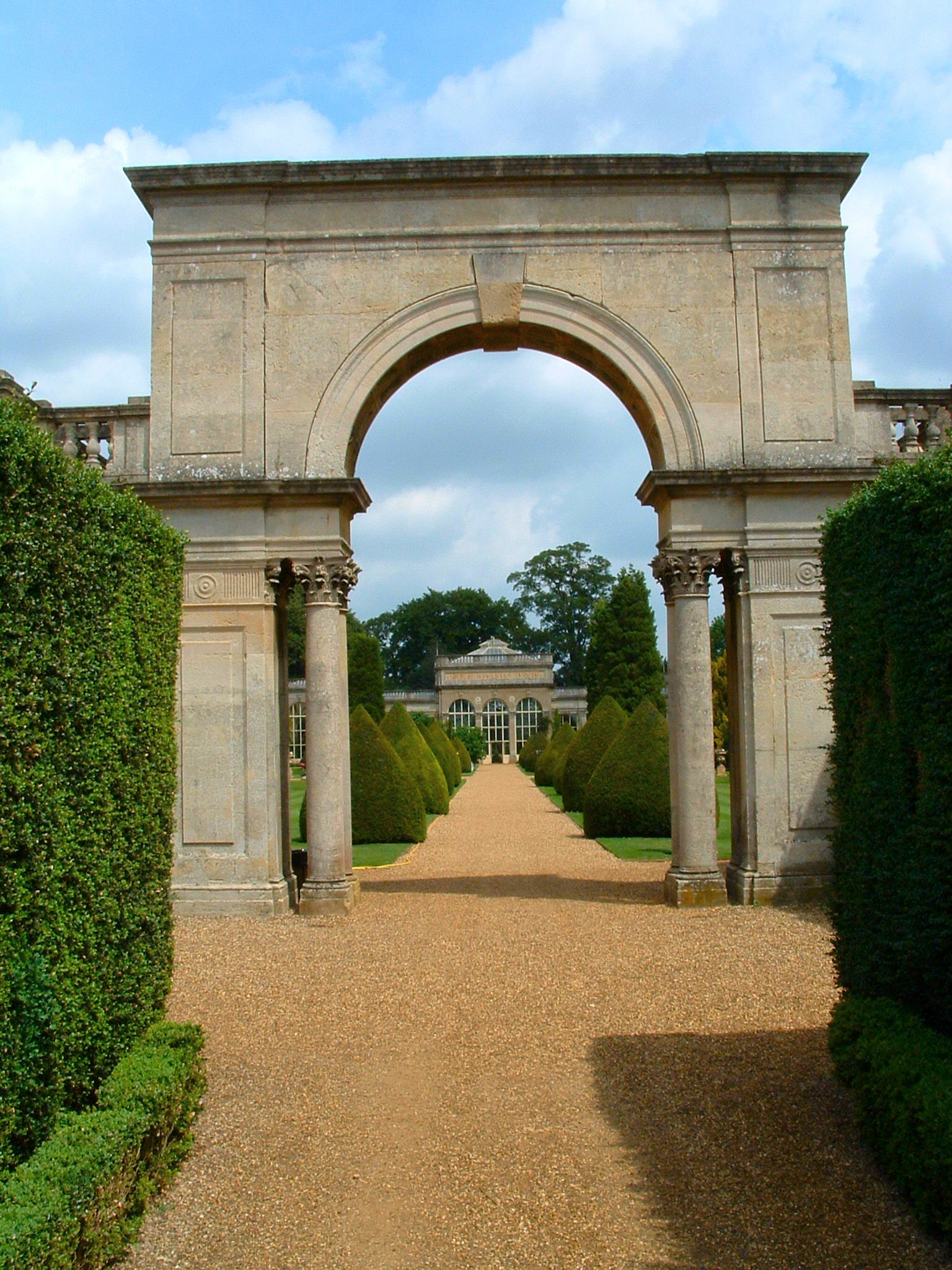
Orangery in the formal garden

In 1867 the architect E.W. Godwin was called in to undertake further work; as a result, the Italianate Orangery and the Birmingham show houses were built to his designs. The old kitchen garden between them was also turned into an Italian garden with shaped beds divided by box edging, and the enormous kitchen garden beyond was walled in. Lodges were built approaching the station and at the entrance to the Avenue from the Northampton road. This latter pair, however, were pulled down in 1869, a year after their construction, for being too close together and were immediately rebuilt in their present position.

Later still, in the time of the 4th Marquess (1877–1897), extensive redecoration was carried out to the Long Gallery, Great Hall, Billiards Room and Chapel. Plans for the redecoration of the Long Gallery were drawn up by William Burges, but these were not executed and the work was undertaken by Thomas Graham Jackson.

The house was designated as Grade I listed in 1968, as was St Mary's Church. The grounds were listed as Grade I on the Register of Historic Parks and Gardens in 1984. Two garden features are Grade II* listed: the Menagerie (1760s) and the Terrace Gardens (1864–1866).

== Grounds ==
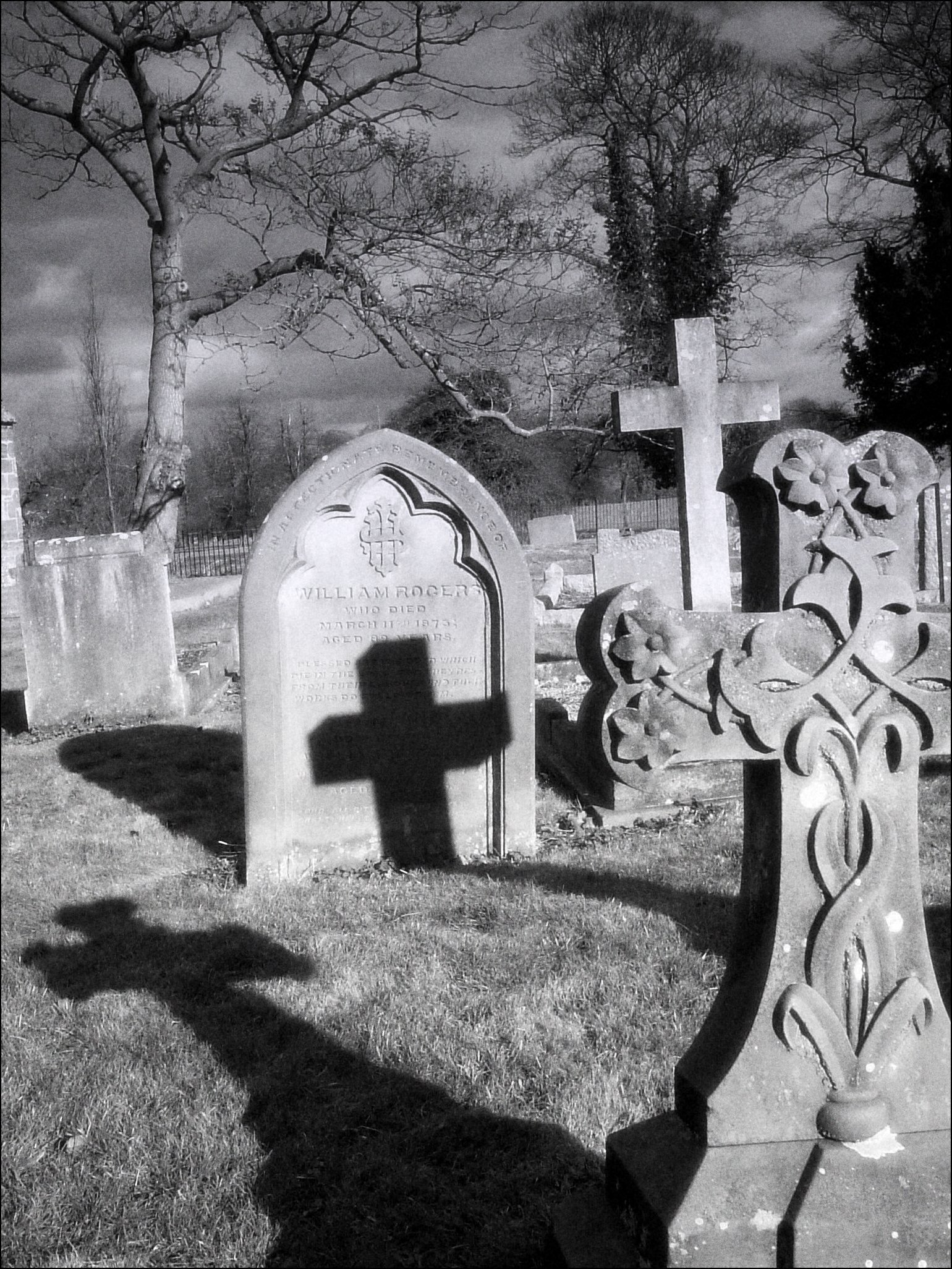
Part of the Castle Ashby graveyard

The Castle Ashby Estate is managed by Compton Estates for Lord Northampton; the estate includes land in many of the neighbouring villages, such as Grendon, Denton and Yardley Hastings.The estate grounds also include a cricket pitch in front of the castle and a drive almost 4 miles (6.4 km) long.

The house is not open to the public, but much of the grounds are.

== Events ==
The grounds provided the venue for the Greenbelt Christian music festival each year between 1984 and 1992.

Two open-air concerts were given by Sir Elton John in the grounds in front of the house in July 2000.

== In popular culture ==
Academic Dr. Robert Clark theorized Jane Austen based her 1814 novel Mansfield Park's eponymous fictional Northamptonshire country house on Castle Ashby.

The greenhouse at Castle Ashby Gardens was used for filming part of the film Men in Black: International, doubling as part of Riza's Castle.

== See also ==
- Marquess of Northampton
- Compton Wynyates
