= Regular Grand Lodge of Macedonia =

Regular Grand Lodge of Macedonia old, free and accepted masons
- Established: 2010 (April 6010 AL)
- Location: North Macedonia
- Region served: North Macedonia
- Grand Master: Goran Rafajlovski
- Website: www.rglm.mk

The Regular Grand Lodge of Macedonia is a Grand Lodge of Freemasonry operating in North Macedonia. It has three constituent lodges:

- Lodge Saint Naum of Ohrid
- Lodge Old Skopje
- Lodge Justinian The Great

The Regular Grand Lodge of Macedonia is not recognised as a Regular Masonic jurisdiction by the United Grand Lodge of England or other regular jurisdictions. The regular body in North Macedonia is the older Grand Lodge of Macedonia.
