= Marquess of Northampton =

Title in the British peerage

Marquessate of Northampton
- Arms of Compton: Sable, a Lion passant guardant Or, between three Esquire's Helmets Argent. Crest: On a Mount, a Beacon proper, behind it a Riband inscribed with the words "NISI DOMINUS" (If not God, nothing). Supporters: Dexter: a Dragon Ermine, ducally gorged and chained Or. Sinister: A Unicorn Argent, armed maned hoofed and tufted Sable.
- Creation date: 7 September 1812
- Creation: Second
- Created by: The Prince Regent (acting on behalf of his father King George III)
- Peerage: Peerage of the United Kingdom (second creation)
- First holder: William Parr, 1st Marquess of Northampton (first creation); Charles Compton, 9th Earl of Northampton (second creation)
- Present holder: Spencer Compton, 7th Marquess of Northampton (second creation)
- Heir apparent: Daniel Compton, Earl Compton
- Remainder to: Heirs male of the body, lawfully begotten
- Subsidiary titles: Earl of Northampton (fourth creation); Earl Compton; Baron Wilmington
- Status: Extinct (first creation); Extant (second creation)
- Extinction date: 28 October 1571 (first creation)
- Seats: Castle Ashby House; Compton Wynyates
- Motto: JE NE CHERCHE QU'UN (I seek but one)

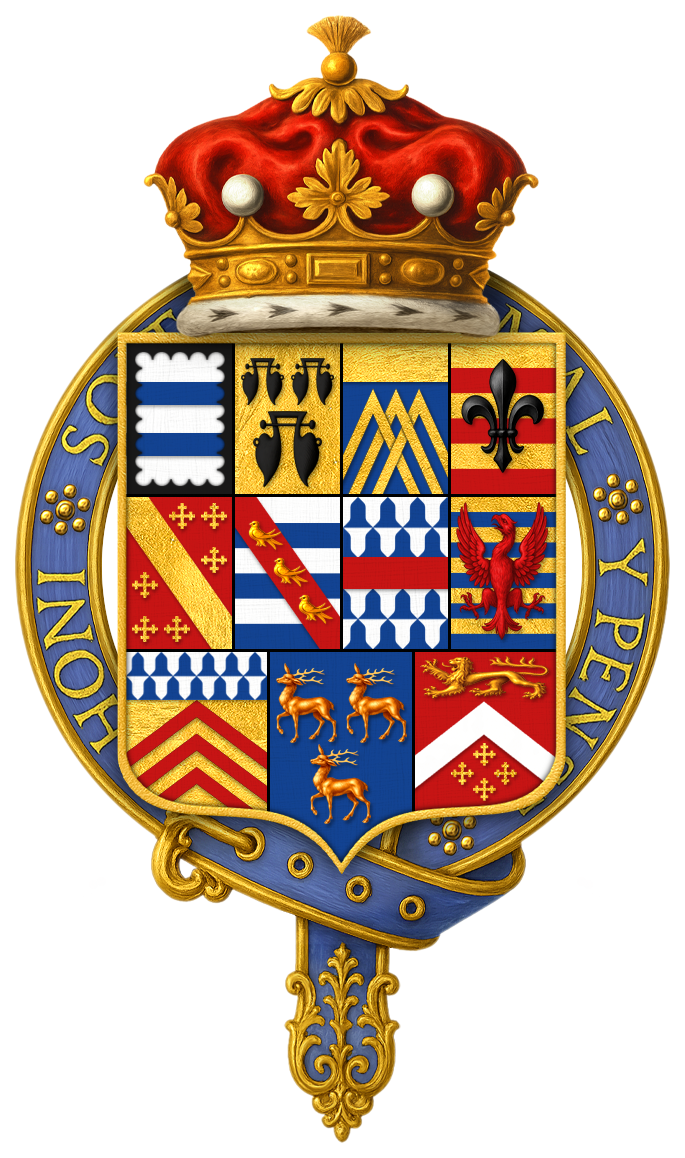
Arms of William Parr, 1st Marquess of Northampton (first creation)

Marquess of Northampton is a title that has been created twice, firstly in the Peerage of England (1547), then secondly in the Peerage of the United Kingdom (1812). The current holder of this title is Spencer Compton, 7th Marquess of Northampton.

== First creation ==
The title of Marquess of Northampton was created for the first time in the Peerage of England in 1547 in favour of William Parr, brother of Catherine Parr, the sixth and last wife of King Henry VIII. The title was forfeited in 1554 after the accession of Queen Mary I but restored in 1559 by Queen Elizabeth I. On Parr's death in 1571, the title became extinct.

== Second creation ==
However, the title is chiefly associated with the Compton family. This family descends from Sir Henry Compton, who in 1572 was summoned to the House of Lords as Baron Compton, of Compton in the County of Warwick. This title was in the Peerage of England. Lord Compton was later one of the peers at the trial of Mary, Queen of Scots. He was succeeded by his son, the second Baron, the later first Earl. He served as Lord President of the Marches and of the Dominion of Wales and was also Lord Lieutenant of Warwickshire. In 1618 he was created Earl of Northampton in the Peerage of England.

His son, the second Earl, was a supporter of King James I and served as Master of the Robes to Charles, Prince of Wales (later King Charles I). He fought in the Civil War and was killed at the Battle of Hopton Heath in 1643. He was succeeded by his son, the third Earl. He also fought as a Royalist in the Civil War and notably commanded the cavalry at the First Battle of Newbury in 1643. Lord Northampton was also Lord Lieutenant of Warwickshire and Constable of the Tower of London. His eldest son, the fourth Earl, also served as Constable of the Tower of London and as Lord Lieutenant of Warwickshire.

His eldest son, the fifth Earl, briefly represented Warwick in the House of Commons but in 1711 he was summoned to the House of Lords through a writ of acceleration in his father's junior title of Baron Compton. In 1716, he married Elizabeth Shirley, who became suo jure 15th Baroness Ferrers of Chartley the following year. They had no sons and Lord Northampton was succeeded in the barony of Compton, which could be passed on through female lines, by his daughter Lady Charlotte. The earldom passed to his younger brother, the sixth Earl. He had earlier represented Tamworth and Northampton in Parliament.

He was childless and was succeeded by his nephew, the seventh Earl. He was the son of the Hon. Charles Compton, third son of the fourth Earl. Lord Northampton died childless at an early age and was succeeded by his younger brother, the eighth Earl. He briefly represented Northampton in the House of Commons before he inherited the earldom and also served as Lord Lieutenant of Northamptonshire. His son, the ninth Earl, sat as Member of Parliament for Northampton and served as Lord Lieutenant of Northamptonshire. In 1812 he was created Baron Wilmington, of Wilmington in the County of Sussex, Earl Compton, of Compton in the County of Warwick, and Marquess of Northampton. These titles were in the Peerage of the United Kingdom.

On his death, the titles passed to his son, the second Marquess. He represented Northampton in Parliament but is best remembered as a patron of science and the arts. Between 1838 and 1848 he served as president of the Royal Society. He was also instrumental in helping the new College of Preceptors (College of Teachers) of London receive its Royal Charter. Lord Northampton married Margaret Douglas-Maclean-Clephane, daughter of Major-General Douglas Maclean Clephane. He was succeeded by his eldest son, the third Marquess. In 1831 he assumed by Royal licence the additional and principal surname of Douglas. When he died the titles were inherited by his younger brother, the fourth Marquess. He was an admiral in the Royal Navy. Lord Northampton assumed in 1851 by Royal licence the additional surname of Maclean and in 1878 upon succeeding to the titles that of Douglas.

He was succeeded by his second but eldest surviving son, the fifth Marquess. He represented Stratford-on-Avon and Barnsley in Parliament as a Liberal and served as Lord Lieutenant of Warwickshire. As of 2017, the titles are held by his grandson, the seventh Marquess, who succeeded his father in 1978.

Northampton Institute, founded in 1894, was named after William Compton, 4th Marquess of Northampton and now it is City, University of London (formerly The City University).

=== Other notable members of the Compton family ===
Several other members of the Compton family have gained distinction. Henry Compton, sixth son of the second Earl of Northampton, was Bishop of London. Spencer Compton, 1st Earl of Wilmington, Prime Minister of Great Britain from 1742 to 1743, was the third son of the third Earl. Catherine Compton, daughter of the Hon. Charles Compton, third son of the fourth Earl, was created Baroness Arden in 1770. She was the wife of John Perceval, 2nd Earl of Egmont, and the mother of another Prime Minister, Spencer Perceval. Lord Alwyne Compton, fourth son of the second Marquess, was Bishop of Ely. Lord Alwyne Compton, third son of the fourth Marquess, was a Unionist politician. He was the father of Captain Edward Robert Francis Compton. The latter married as his first wife Sylvia, daughter of Alexander Haldane Farquharson. Their son Alwyne Arthur Compton was officially recognised by warrant of the Lord Lyon in the surname of Farquharson of Invercauld and as Chief of Clan Farquharson in 1949.

=== Estates ===
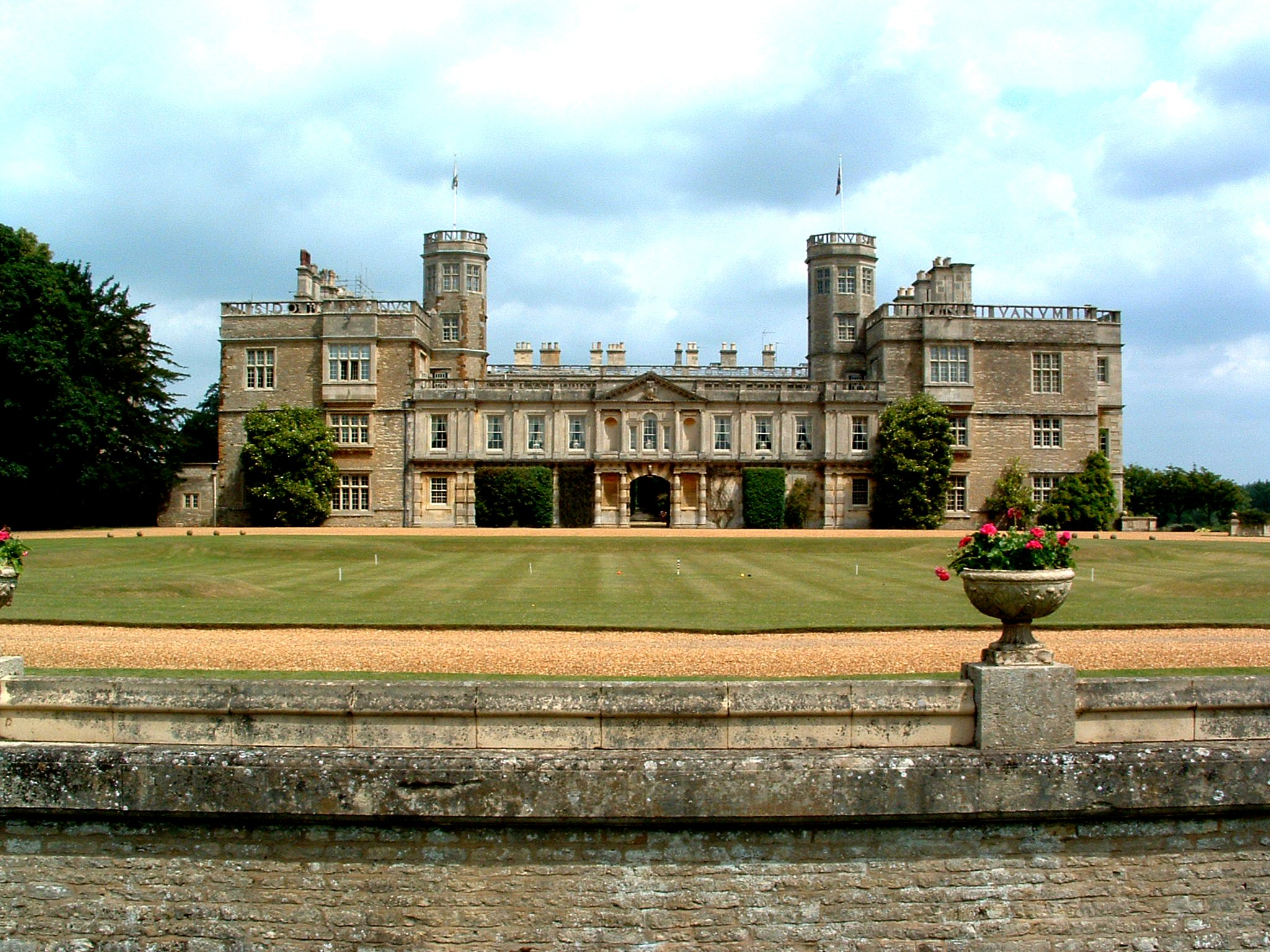
Castle Ashby House in Northamptonshire

The Compton family are major land owners. Their two major estates are Castle Ashby House in Northamptonshire and Compton Wynyates in Warwickshire. The family also owns land and property, including the 16th-century Canonbury Tower in Islington, north London, where many streets are named after names associated with the family. These include: Alwyne Road/Place/Villas/Square; Bingham Street; Compton Road/Terrace; Douglas Road; Northampton Road/Street/Square; Spencer Street; Percival (formerly Perceval) Street; and Wilmington Square.

== Marquesses of Northampton; First creation (1547) ==
- William Parr, Marquess of Northampton (1513–1571) (forfeit 1553; restored 1559; extinct 1571)

== Barons Compton (1572) ==
- Henry Compton, 1st Baron Compton (1554-1589)
- William Compton, 2nd Baron Compton (died 1630) (created Earl of Northampton in 1618)

== Earls of Northampton (1618) ==
Subsidiary title Baron Compton through the 5th Earl.

- William Compton, 1st Earl of Northampton, 2nd Baron Compton (died 1630)
- Spencer Compton, 2nd Earl of Northampton, 3rd Baron Compton (1601–1643)
- James Compton, 3rd Earl of Northampton, 4th Baron Compton (1622–1681)
- George Compton, 4th Earl of Northampton, 5th Baron Compton (1664–1727)
- James Compton, 5th Earl of Northampton, 6th Baron Compton (1687–1754)
  - Charlotte Townshend, 7th Baroness Compton (d. 1770), Barony Compton continued with her descendents
- George Compton, 6th Earl of Northampton (1692–1758)
- Charles Compton, 7th Earl of Northampton (1737–1763)
- Spencer Compton, 8th Earl of Northampton (1738–1796)
- Charles Compton, 9th Earl of Northampton (1760–1828) (created Marquess of Northampton, Earl Compton, and Baron Wilmington in 1812)

== Marquesses of Northampton; Second creation (1812) ==
- Charles Compton, 1st Marquess of Northampton, 1st Earl Compton, 1st Baron Wilmington (1760–1828)
- Spencer Joshua Alwyne Compton, 2nd Marquess of Northampton, 2nd Earl Compton, 2nd Baron Wilmington (1790–1851)
- Charles Douglas-Compton, 3rd Marquess of Northampton, 3rd Earl Compton, 3rd Baron Wilmington (1816–1877)
- William Compton, 4th Marquess of Northampton, 4th Earl Compton, 4th Baron Wilmington (1818–1897)
- William George Spencer Scott Compton, 5th Marquess of Northampton, 5th Earl Compton, 5th Baron Wilmington (1851–1913)
- William Bingham Compton, 6th Marquess of Northampton, 6th Earl Compton, 6th Baron Wilmington (1885–1978)
- Spencer Douglas David Compton, 7th Marquess of Northampton, 7th Earl Compton, 7th Baron Wilmington (b. 1946)

The heir apparent is the present holder's son, Daniel Bingham Compton, Earl Compton (b. 1973)
The heir apparent's heir apparent is his son, Henry Douglas Hungerford Compton, Lord Wilmington (b. 2018)

Line of succession (simplified)
- William Compton, 4th Marquess of Northampton (1818–1897)
  - William Compton, 5th Marquess of Northampton (1851–1913)
    - William Compton, 6th Marquess of Northampton (1885–1978)
      - Spencer Compton, 7th Marquess of Northampton (b. 1946)
        - (1). Daniel Bingham Compton, Earl Compton (born 1973)
          - (2). Henry Douglas Hungerford Compton, Lord Wilmington (born 2018)
      - Lord William James Bingham Compton (1947–2007)
        - (3). James William Compton (b. 1974)
          - (4). William Edward Richard Compton (b. 2010)
  - Lord Alwyne Frederick Compton (1855–1911)
    - Edward Robert Francis Compton (1891–1977)
      - Robert Edward John Compton (1922–2009)
        - male issue and descendants in remainder

== Family tree ==
Dukes of Exeter, Marquesses of Northampton, Earls of Huntingdon, and Earls of Wilmington family tree

Robert; 1000–1035; Duke of Normandy
Adelaide of Normandy c. 1030–before 1090; Countess of Aumale	William the Conqueror c. 1028–1087; King of England
Earl of Huntingdon (1st creation), 1065; Earl of Northampton (1st creation), 1071
Waltheof d. 1076; Earl of Northumbria, 1st Earl of Huntingdon, 1st Earl of Northampton	Judith of Lens; 1054/1055–c. 1090
David I c. 1084–1153; King of Alba	Maud c. 1074–1130; 2nd Countess of Huntingdon, 2nd Countess of Northampton, Queen of Scotland	Simon I de Senlis d. 1111–1113; 2nd Earl of Huntingdon, 2nd Earl of Northampton jure uxoris
Henry of Scotland; 1114–1152; 3rd Earl of Huntingdon, Earl of Northumbria	Simon II de Senlis c. 1098–1153; 4th Earl of Huntingdon, 3rd Earl of Northampton
Malcolm IV; 1141–1165; King of Alba, 5th Earl of Huntingdon	William I (the Lion) c. 1142–1214; King of Alba, 6th Earl of Huntingdon	David; 1152–1219; 8th Earl of Huntingdon, Earl of Northumbria	Simon III de Senlis c. 1138–1184; 7th Earl of Huntingdon, 4th Earl of Northampton
Earldom of Northampton (1st creation) reverted to the Crown, 1184
John of Scotland; 1207–1237; 9th Earl of Huntingdon, Earl of Chester
Earldom of Huntingdon (1st creation) extinct, 1237 and later reverted to the Crown
Earl of Huntingdon (2nd creation), 1337
William de Clinton c. 1304–1354; Earl of Huntingdon, Baron Clinton
Earl of Northampton (2nd creation), 1337	Earldom of Huntingdon (2nd creation) extinct, 1354	Earl of Huntingdon (3rd creation for life), 1377
William de Bohun c. 1312 – 1373; Earl of Hereford, Earl of Essex, 1st Earl of Northampton	Edward III; 1312–1377; King of England	Guichard (IV) d'Angle c. 1305/1315–1380; Earl of Huntingdon
Earldom of Huntingdon (3rd creation) extinct, 1380
Humphrey de Bohun; 1342–1373; Earl of Hereford, Earl of Essex, 2nd Earl of Northampton	Joan of Kent c. 1328–1385	Edward of Woodstock "The Black Prince; 1330–1376	John of Gaunt; 1340–1399; Duke of Lancaster	Thomas of Woodstock; 1355–1397; Duke of Gloucester
Earldom of Northampton (2nd creation) abeyant, 1373
Earl of Huntingdon (4th creation), 1388; Duke of Exeter (1st creation), 1397	Earl of Northampton (2nd creation restored), 1384	Duke of Exeter (2nd creation), 1416	Earl of Northampton (3rd creation), 1399
John Holland c. 1352–1400; 1st Duke of Exeter, 1st Earl of Huntingdon	Richard II; 1367–c. 1400; King of England	Henry Bolingbroke c. 1367 – 1413; 3rd Earl of Northampton, later King Henry IV	Thomas Beaufort c. 1377–1426; Duke of Exeter; Earl of Dorset	Anne of Gloucester; 1383–1438; Countess of Northampton
Dukedom of Exeter (1st creation) and Earldom of Huntingdon (4th creation) forfeit, 1400	Earldom of Northampton (2nd creation) merged in the crown, 1399	Dukedom of Exeter (2nd creation) extinct, 1426	Earldom of Northampton (3rd creation) extinct, 1438
Earldom of Huntingdon (4th creation) restored, 1416; Duke of Exeter (1st creation restored or 3rd creation), 1444
John Holland; 1395–1447; 2nd Duke of Exeter, 2nd Earl of Huntingdon
Henry Holland; 1430–1475; 3rd Duke of Exeter, 3rd Earl of Huntingdon	Edward IV; 1421–1471; King of England	Elizabeth Woodville c. 1437–1492
Dukedom of Exeter (1st/3rd creation) and Earldom of Huntingdon (4th creation) forfeit, 1461
Earl of Huntingdon (5th creation), 1471	Earl of Huntingdon (6th creation), 1479
Thomas Grey; 1455–1501; Earl of Huntingdon, Marquess of Dorset	Mary Woodville c. 1456–1481	William Herbert; 1451–1491; Earl of Huntingdon, Earl of Pembroke
Earldom of Huntingdon (5th creation) surrendered, 1475	Earldom of Huntingdon (6th creation) extinct, 1491
Earl of Huntingdon (7th creation), 1529
Thomas Parr; 1478–1517	George Hastings; 1488–1544; 1st Earl of Huntingdon
Baron Parr of Kendall, 1539; Marquess of Northampton (1st creation), Baron Hart, 1543	Baron Hastings of Loughborough, 1558
Henry VIII; 1491–1547; King of England	Catherine Parr; 1512–1548	William Parr; 1513–1571; Marquess of Northampton, Earl of Essex, 1st Baron Parr, 1st Baron Hart	Francis Hastings; 1514–1561; 2nd Earl of Huntingdon	Edward Hastings c. 1521–1572; Baron Hastings of Loughborough
Marquessate of Northampton (1st creation), Earldom of Essex (7th creation) forfeit, 1554; restored, 1559; extinct, 1571	Barony Hastings of Loughborough extinct, 1572
Earl of Northampton, (4th creation), 1604	Baron Compton, 1572
Henry Howard; 1540–1614; Earl of Northampton	Henry Compton; 1544–1589; 1st Baron Compton	Frances Anne Hastings; 1533–1574	Henry Hastings; 1536–1595; 3rd Earl of Huntingdon	George Hastings; 1540–1604; 4th Earl of Huntingdon	Edward Hastings; 1541–1603
Earldom of Northampton (4th creation) extinct, 1614
Earl of Northampton (5th creation), 1618
William Compton d. 1630; 1st Earl of Northampton, 2nd Baron Compton	Francis Hastings; 1560–1595	Henry c. 1555–1640
Henry Hastings; 1586–1643; 5th Earl of Huntingdon
Spencer Compton; 1601–1643; 2nd Earl of Northampton, 3rd Baron Compton	Ferdinando Hastings; 1609–1656; 6th Earl of Huntingdon	Henry b. 1605
James Compton; 1622–1681; 3rd Earl of Northampton, 4th Baron Compton	Theophilus Hastings; 1650–1701; 7th Earl of Huntingdon	Richard; 1645–1714
Baron Wilmington, 1728; Earl of Wilmington and Viscount Pevensey, 1730
George Compton; 1664–1727; 4th Earl of Northampton, 5th Baron Compton	Spencer Compton c. 1674 – 1743; Earl of Wilmington, Viscount Pevensey, Baron Wilmington	George Hastings; 1677–1705; 8th Earl of Huntingdon
Earldom of Wilmington, Vicountcy Pevensey, and Barony Wilmington extinct, 1743
James Compton; 1687–1754; 5th Earl of Northampton, 6th Baron Compton	George Compton; 1692–1758; 6th Earl of Northampton	Charles Compton	Theophilus Hastings c. 1696–1746; 9th Earl of Huntingdon	Henry; 1701–1786
Charlotte Townshend d. 1770; Viscountess Townshend, Baroness Ferrers of Chartley, 7th Baroness Compton	Charles Compton; 1737–1763; 7th Earl of Northampton	Francis Hastings; 1729–1789; 10th Earl of Huntingdon	Theophilus Hastings; 1728–1804; 11th Earl of Huntingdon de jure	George; 1735–1802
Earldom of Huntingdon dormant/abeyant, 1804
George Townshend; 1753–1811; Marquess Townshend, Earl of Leicester, Viscount Townshend, Baron Townshend, Baron Ferrers of Chartley, 8th Baron Compton	Spencer Compton; 1760–1828; 8th Earl of Northampton
Marquess of Northampton (2nd creation), Earl Compton and Baron Wilmington, 1812	Earldom of Huntingdon claim restored, 1819
George Townshend (1778–1885); Marquess Townshend, Earl of Leicester, Viscount Townshend, Baron Townshend, Baron Ferrers of Chartley, 9th Baron Compton	Charles Compton; 1760–1828; 1st Marquess of Northampton, etc., 9th Earl of Northampton	Hans "Francis" Hastings; 1779–1828; 12th Earl of Huntingdon
Barony Compton abeyant, 1855
Spencer Joshua Alwyne Compton; 1790–1851; 2nd Marquess of Northampton, etc., 10th Earl of Northampton
Charles Douglas-Compton; 1816–1877; 3rd Marquess of Northampton, etc., 11th Earl of Northampton	William Compton; 1818–1897; 4th Marquess of Northampton, etc., 12th Earl of Northampton	Francis Theophilus Henry Hastings; 1808–1875; 13th Earl of Huntingdon	George; 1814–1876
Francis Power Plantagenet Hastings; 1841–1885; 14th Earl of Huntingdon
William George Spencer Scott Compton; 1851–1913; 5th Marquess of Northampton, etc., 13th Earl of Northampton	Warner Francis John Plantagenet Hastings; 1868–1939; 15th Earl of Huntingdon	Aubrey; 1878–1929	Hans; 1865–1933
William Bingham Compton; 1885–1978; 6th Marquess of Northampton, etc., 14th Earl of Northampton	Francis John Clarence Westenra Plantagenet Hastings; 1901–1990; 16th Earl of Huntingdon	Peter Hastings-Bass; 1920–1964	George; 1905–1981
Spencer Douglas David Compton b. 1946; 7th Marquess of Northampton, etc., 15th Earl of Northampton	William Edward Robin Hood Hastings-Bass b. 1948; 17th Earl of Huntingdon	John Hastings-Bass b. 1954	George; 1938–2005
Heir presumptive to the Earldom of Huntingdon
Daniel Bingham Compton b. 1973 styled Earl Compton	Adam b. 1977
Heir apparent to the Marquessate of Northampton	Second Heir presumptive to the Earldom of Huntingdon

== See also ==
- Baron Compton
- Baroness Arden
- Earl of Northampton
- Earl of Wilmington
- Marquess
