= William Compton, 6th Marquess of Northampton =

British peer and soldier (1885–1978)

William Bingham Compton, 6th Marquess of Northampton, DSO (6 August 1885 – 30 January 1978), known as Earl Compton from 1897 to 1913, was a British peer and soldier.

== Early life ==
Northampton was the eldest son of William George Spencer Scott Compton, 5th Marquess of Northampton, and his wife Mary Florence (née Baring). He was educated at Eton College and Balliol College, Oxford, where he graduated as B.A. in 1906.

== Military and public service ==
Initially a Lieutenant in the Northamptonshire Yeomanry, he was commissioned into the regular army in the Royal Horse Guards, of which he became Adjutant in 1913 and achieved the rank of Major. He fought in the First World War, during which he was twice mentioned in despatches and wounded. He was appointed a Commander of the Order of Leopold (Belgium) and in 1919 he was awarded the Distinguished Service Order. He was also a Commander of the Order of St John of Jerusalem.

He transferred as a Captain to the Warwickshire Yeomanry in 1921 and rose to the rank of Lieutenant-Colonel in command, retiring in 1932. He was also honorary Colonel of the 11th Battalion of the London Regiment (Finsbury Rifles) from 1923 to 1934.

He served in local government on the Northamptonshire County Council, to which he was elected in 1922, became chairman in 1949, and resigned in 1955. He also became DL in 1936 for the Scottish County of Ross, and DL for Northamptonshire in 1937, as well as J.P. for the latter county.

William Bingham Compton authored the book History of the Comptons of Compton Wynyates, which was published in 1930 by J. Lane and Bodley Head Ltd of London in a limited edition of only 200 copies.

== Personal life ==
As Earl Compton, he became engaged in 1912 to divorced actress Miss Daisy Markham (alias Mrs Annie Moss), who during the relationship ceased her acting work and bore him twin children. As result of family pressure he broke off the engagement after succeeding to his peerage, which led to a breach of promise lawsuit by Markham. She accepted from him a settlement of £50,000 (worth under £2,153,000 in 2005), a record in British legal history for a breach of promise case, in 1913.

Lord Northampton married, firstly, Lady Emma Marjory, daughter of Thomas Thynne, 5th Marquess of Bath, in 1921. They had no children and were divorced in 1941. He married, secondly, Virginia Lucie, daughter of Captain David Rimington Heaton, in 1942. They had two sons and two daughters, but were divorced in 1958. He married, thirdly, in 1958 with Lady Elspeth Grace Whitaker, daughter of William Ingham Whitaker and a member of the Whitaker family. Lord Northampton died in January 1978, aged 92, and was succeeded in his titles by his eldest son from his second marriage, Spencer. His eldest child, Lady Judith Compton, was married to Sir Adrian Swire.

== Sources ==
- Kidd, Charles, Williamson, David (editors). Debrett's Peerage and Baronetage (1990 edition). New York: St Martin's Press, 1990.
- Leigh Rayment's Peerage Pages
- Profile, thepeerage.com; accessed 8 April 2016.

Peerage of the United Kingdom
Preceded by William Compton	Marquess of Northampton; 2nd creation 1913 – 1978	Succeeded by Spencer Compton
