= Compton Wynyates =

Country house in Warwickshire, England

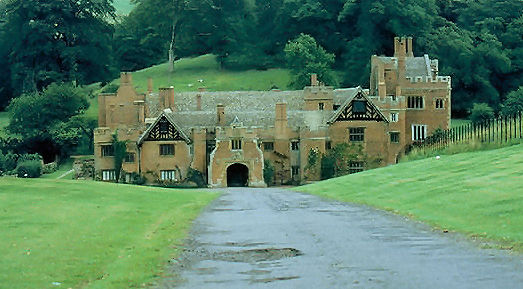
- Compton Wynyates, c. 1983
- Interactive map of Compton Wynyates
- 52.073980°N 1.518650°W
- Location: Compton Wynyates, Warwickshire, England

Site notes
- Architectural style: Tudor
- Owner: Marquess of Northampton

Listed Building – Grade I
- Official name: Compton Wynyates
- Designated: 2 September 1952
- Reference no.: 1024349

Listed Building – Grade II
- Official name: Compton Wynyates, Dovecote
- Designated: 2 September 1952
- Reference no.: 1024350

Compton Wynyates is a Tudor country house in Warwickshire, England, a Grade I listed building. The Tudor period house is constructed of red brick and built around a central courtyard. It is castellated and turreted in parts. Following action in the Civil War, half-timbered gables were added to replace damaged parts of the building.

The Compton family, who still live today in this private house, appear in records as resident on the site as early as 1204. The family continued to live in the manor house as knights and squires of the county until Sir Edmund Compton (who died c. 1493) decided, c. 1481, to build a new family home.Wynates is the birthplace and burial place of Spencer Compton, 1st Earl of Wilmington, considered to be the second Prime Minister of the United Kingdom.

== Edmund Compton's house ==
Edmund Compton constructed the house of bricks that have a glowing raspberry colour of striking intensity. Edmund's four-winged house around a central courtyard is recognisable by the thickness of the 4 feet (1.2 m) deep walls that form the core of the existing mansion. This new fortified house was fully moated, and parts of the moat form a pond in the garden today. There was also a second moat (probably dry) and second drawbridge. However fortifications were not the only consideration for the new mansion—dark brick diapering and decorative mouldings add variety to the façade. Over the entrance the Royal Arms of England are supported by the dragon and greyhound of Henry VII of England and Henry VIII. The architect or mason builder is unknown.

== William Compton's house ==
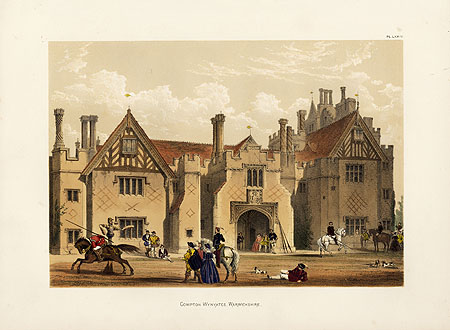
A 19th-century romanticised view of the gate house at Compton Wynyates

Edmund died young and as a consequence his son William Compton became a ward of the Crown, as was the custom. At the court of Henry VII the eleven-year-old orphaned William Compton became a page to the two-year-old Prince Henry and thus began a close friendship, which continued after the prince succeeded as Henry VIII. As a result of this lifelong friendship, Henry VIII gave William, who was also to become a military hero, many rewards, amongst them the ruinous Fulbroke Castle. Numerous fittings at Fulbroke were brought to embellish Compton Wynyates, including the huge bay window full of heraldic glass, which looks into the courtyard from the great hall; also from the castle came many of the mullioned windows with vine-patterned ornamentation.

It was at this time (c. 1515) that the great entrance porch, chapel and many of the towers were built. In fact this was the start of the many additions over the next ten years that were made to the house with no thought to symmetry, height or regularity. The house was simply extended wherever space within the confines of the moat permitted. The brick fluted and twisted chimneys also date from this time and are one of the house's most notable features.

Unlike many other houses of the period, Compton Wynyates has not been greatly altered over the centuries. This is because in 1574 its owner Henry Compton, 1st Baron Compton, began work on one of Britain's finest houses, Castle Ashby. The Comptons continued to lavish money on this new mansion for the next century or so, as a consequence of which Compton Wynyates has survived almost intact as the perfect Tudor mansion, spared the constant improvements of successive generations.

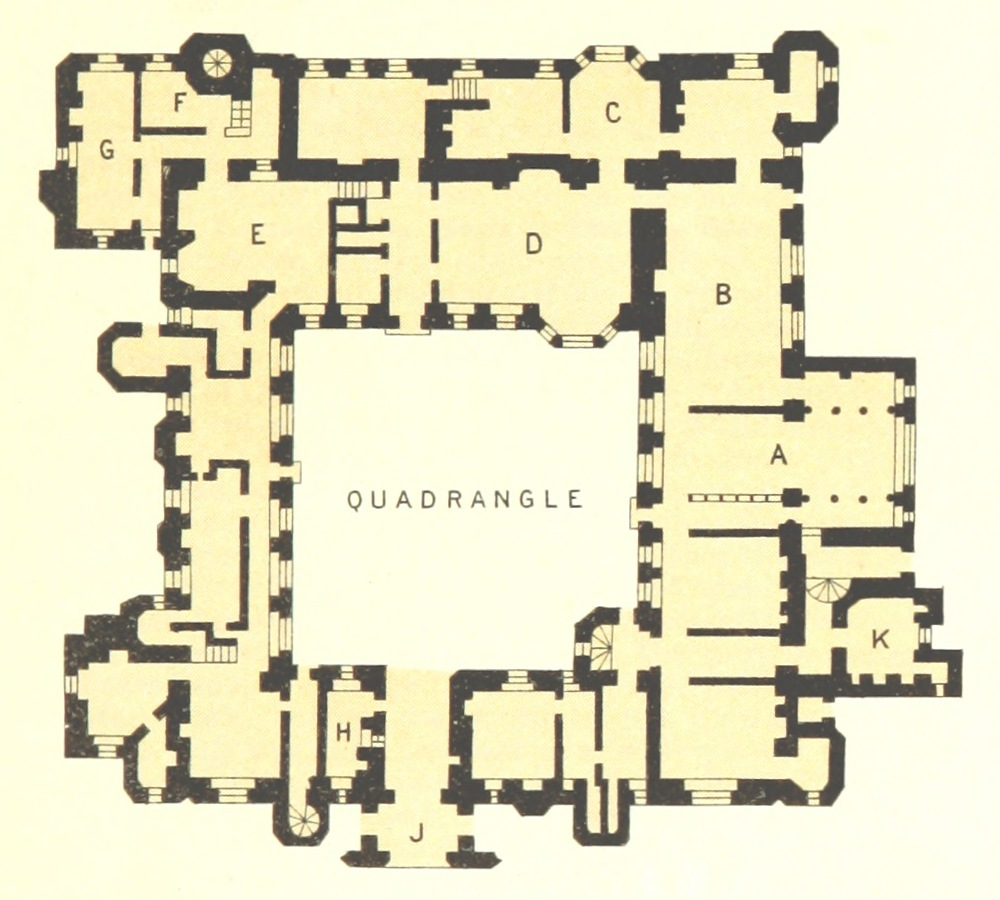
Compton Wynyates Floor Plan. A: Chapel; B; Parlour; C: Staircase; D: Hall; E: Kitchen; F: Larder; G: Scullery; H: Porter's Lodge; J: Porch; K: Cellar

== Royal visits ==
The Comptons, as loyal and rich subjects of the Crown, frequently played host to the reigning sovereign of their time. The frequency with which they entertained state visitors was a barometer of their wealth, and this was an era in which a one-day visit from the monarch could, and frequently did, bankrupt the host.

King Henry VIII stayed many times at Compton Wynyates, and his bedroom window still retains the king's arms in stained glass combined with the arms of Aragon, the home country of his first Queen. Much later, in 1572, Elizabeth I stayed in the house. In 1617 James I spent a night at the house; he had been a frequent guest on previous occasions at Castle Ashby. In 1629 King Charles I, who himself stayed at the house, created Lord Compton Earl of Northampton. The ceiling of the royal bedroom is decorated with the monograms of all the monarchs who have slept here.

An anecdote from the time of the Civil War is that the Cromwellian commander of the house took such a liking to the gilded bed of state, slept in by so many monarchs, that he sequestered it for himself. After the restoration of the monarchy, the 3rd Earl recovered the bed, and it too was restored to its rightful place. Later, when the family fell upon hard times in 1744, this historic bed was sold for £10 and has never since been traced.

== Civil War ==
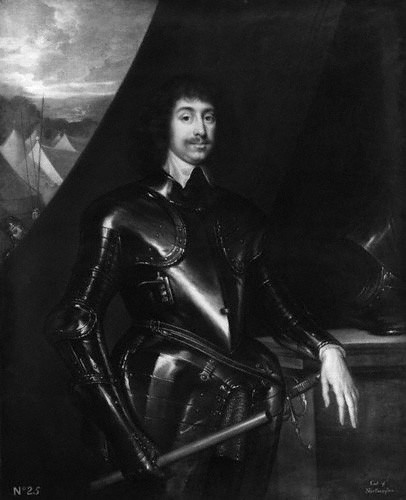
The 2nd Earl of Northampton

Spencer, 2nd Earl of Northampton, a godson of Elizabeth I, was a close friend of Charles I, and the Comptons had strong Royalist ties during the civil war. At the battle of Edgehill, six miles from the house, Spencer and three of his sons fought for the King; the three sons were all knighted for their valour on the battlefield.

The 2nd Earl was killed at the Battle of Hopton Heath in 1643 fighting for his cause, and in the same battle his son and successor, James 3rd Earl of Northampton, was wounded, leaving the family vulnerable. On 12 June 1644, Compton Wynyates was besieged by the Cromwellians, and it fell two days later. The Parliamentarians were recorded as having taken 120 prisoners, £5000 (equivalent to £720,000 in 2008), 60 horses, 400 sheep, 160 head of cattle, 18 loads of plunder (the furnishings of the mansion) and six earthen pots of coins recovered from the moat. The house and the adjacent church still bear the scars of the cannon today.

There is a legend that the widow of the 2nd Earl remained hidden in the attics of the vast house tending to Royalist wounded, undetected by the Cromwellians, until their escape was possible. As the house is a warren of small staircases, passages, and almost concealed rooms – one tower room, the Priest's Room, has three staircases hidden behind its panelling – this story is possible.

During the night of 29 January 1645, the Comptons made an abortive attempt to recapture their home, but were repelled after four hours fighting. The Compton family fled into exile abroad and did not return until the restoration of the monarchy.

== Neglect ==
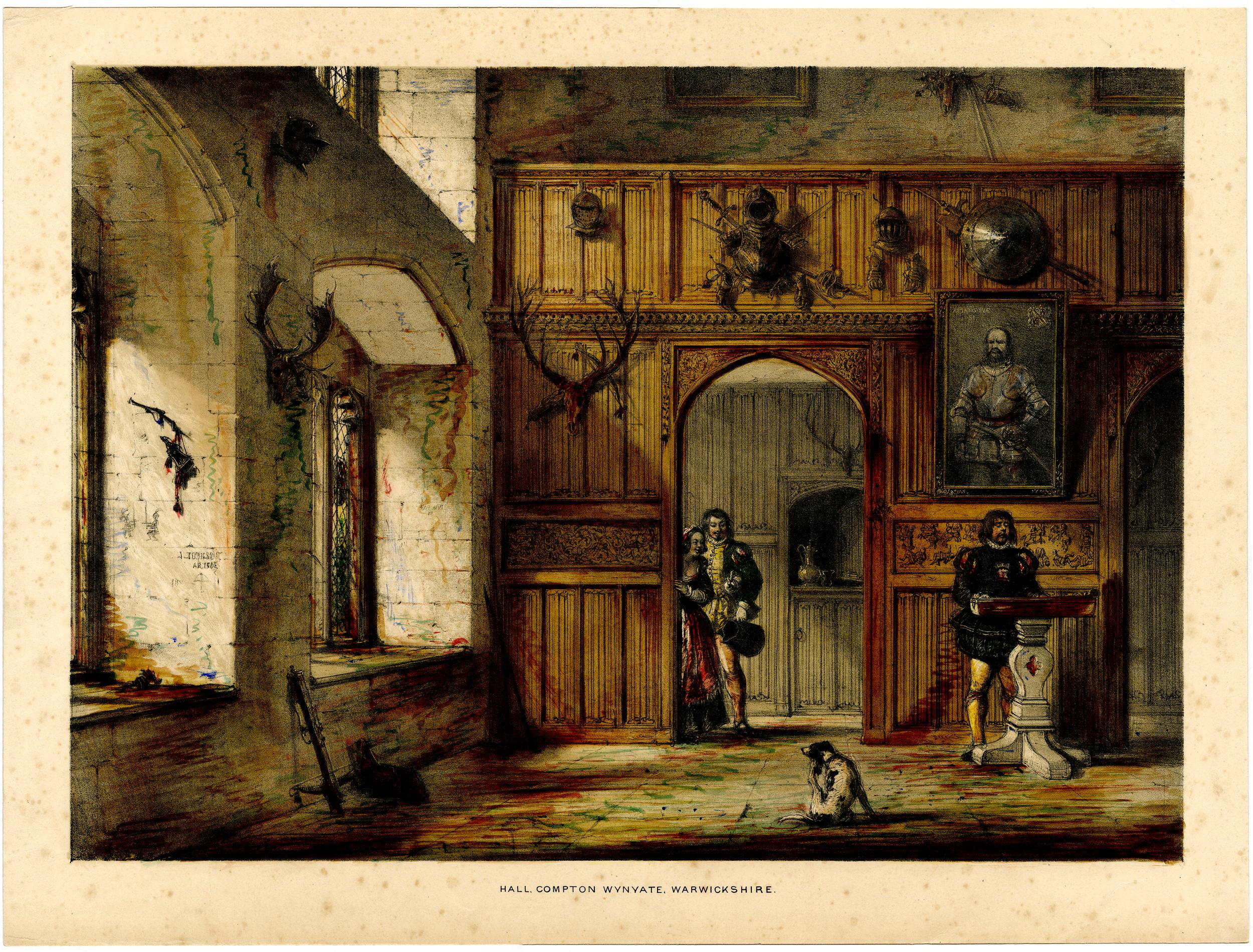
Hall, Compton Wynyates, Warwickshire (1841; hand-coloured lithograph)

Following the restoration of the monarchy, the Comptons too were restored to their estates. As Compton Wynyates was now the minor family house, it tended to be the country home of the heir. Minor alterations were made but usually in sympathy with its Tudor origins. The 5th Earl of Northampton c. 1730 added a wing between two towers on the east side of the house in the classical style, which was not in keeping at all. By this time, though, the family fortunes were running low and, as a result, Compton Wynyates began to suffer neglect. In 1768 the Comptons found themselves in such penury that the entire contents of the house were sold, never to be recovered. The then Lord Northampton, living at Castle Ashby, ordered Compton Wynyates to be demolished. However the family's land-agent ignored the order and merely had the windows bricked up (to avoid the window tax). So the house remained largely forgotten.

== Restoration ==
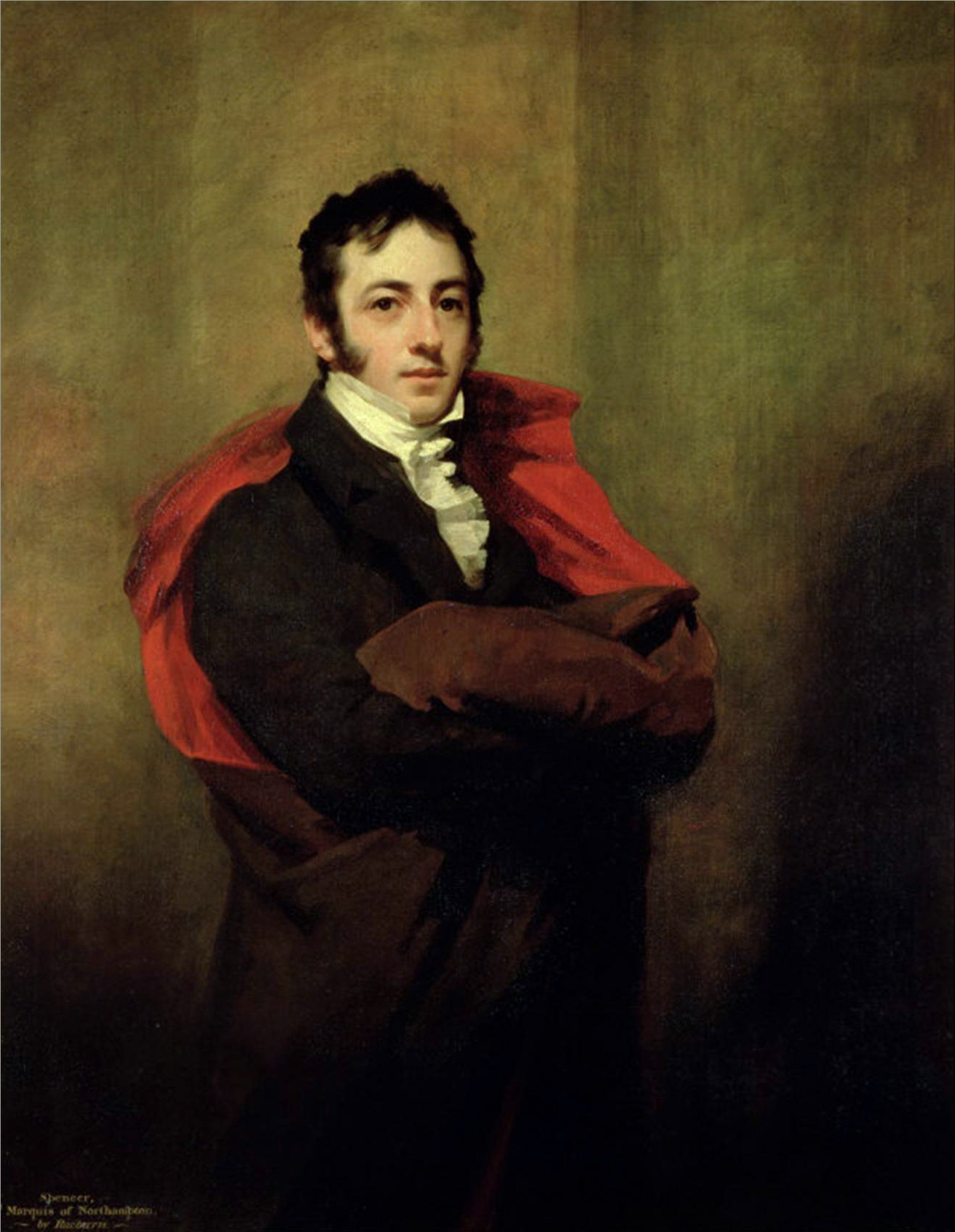
The 2nd Marquess of Northampton, who saved the house from dereliction in 1835

In 1835, the 2nd Marquess of Northampton (the family had been elevated from Earls in 1812) visited Compton Wynyates for the first time and found the house in a ruinous state; he made some minor renovations to prevent complete dereliction. He also employed the architect Sir Digby Wyatt to gothicise the out-of-keeping east front and create a new staircase in the house. This work was a success, and the east front harmonises with the earlier facades of the house.

It was the 4th Marquess who had the house fully restored and presented it to his son, the future 5th Marquess, on his marriage in 1884. The 5th Marquess and Marchioness were the first people to reside in the house since 1770. It was this couple who laid out the topiary gardens and made the mansion the comfortable house it is today.

Wynates is the birthplace and burial place of Spencer Compton, 1st Earl of Wilmington, considered to be the second Prime Minister of the United Kingdom.

== Today ==
The house today remains essentially the mansion that Edmund Compton and his son William completed within a thirty-year period during the reigns of the first two Tudor monarchs.

The 6th Marquess of Northampton (1885–1978) cared greatly for the house and spent a few months each year at Compton Wynyates. It was he who installed the electricity and water supplies; however his principal home always remained Castle Ashby. For a short time the panelled rooms of Compton Wynyates were open to the public: the chapel overlooked by the chapel drawing room, the King's bedroom, the heavily panelled drawing and dining rooms with their moulded plaster ceilings, and works of art, such as the crucifixion by Matteo Balducci, were on limited public display.

On the succession of Spencer, 7th Marquess of Northampton, it was decided that in order for the family to survive the 20th century, Castle Ashby would have to be heavily commercialised. This was achieved and the Marquess and his family returned to make Compton Wynyates their sole country house. However, in the 21st century Castle Ashby was closed to the public (except for occasional weddings), and both houses are now lived in by the family once again.

In 1914 Compton Wynyates served as the inspiration for noted American architect John Russell Pope's design of Branch House in Richmond, Virginia, which was built for the financier John Kerr Branch and his wife.

A dead-end public footpath runs from the village of Upper Tysoe about 1-mile (1.6 km) away, ending at a tall locked gate a few yards short of the estate church, where walkers are instructed to return the way they came. There is no access to the public road a short distance further on.

== Cultural references ==
Compton Wynyates has occasionally been used as a filming location, including: The Black Tent (1955); Carry On Camping (1969), (Coincidentally these establishing shots are said to have come from the earlier Black Tent footage); Candleshoe (1977); Death on the Nile (1978); the 1980s television show Silver Spoons; An Instance of the Fingerpost (1998); The Mirror Crack'd (1980); a 1995 episode of Keeping Up Appearances and the television series The Tudors. The house was the inspiration for Croft Manor in the Tomb Raider series. The Cinema Museum in London holds film of the house from 1938 (Ref HM00083).
