= Henry Compton, 1st Baron Compton =

16th-century English politician and peer (1544–1589)

Henry Compton, 1st Baron Compton (14 July 1544 – 10 December 1589), was an English peer and Member of Parliament.

Compton was the posthumous son of Peter Compton of Compton Wynyates and his wife Anne, daughter of George Talbot, 4th Earl of Shrewsbury, and the grandson of Sir William Compton. He was trained in the law at Gray's Inn (1563). He succeeded his father in 1544 and was knighted in 1567.

He was elected a Member (MP) of the Parliament of England for Old Sarum in 1563 and was appointed High Sheriff of Warwickshire for 1571–1572. In 1572, he was summoned to the House of Lords as Baron Compton, of Compton in the County of Warwick. After his ennoblement, Lord Compton was one of the peers at the trial of Mary, Queen of Scots, in 1586.

Lord Compton died in December 1589, aged 45, and was succeeded in the barony by his son from his first marriage, William, who was created Earl of Northampton in 1618.

== Marriages and children ==
Henry Compton married, firstly, Frances, daughter of Francis Hastings, 2nd Earl of Huntingdon, and Katherine Pole, with whom he had one son:

- William Compton, 1st Earl of Northampton

He married, secondly, Anne, daughter of Sir John Spencer of Althorp and Katherine Kitson, with whom he had a further two sons, including:

- Sir Thomas Compton, made a Knight of the Bath at the coronation of James VI and I in 1603. In 1609 he became the third husband of Mary Villiers, Countess of Buckingham, mother of the great royal favourite George Villiers, 1st Duke of Buckingham.
- Sir Henry Compton (died 1649), who married (1), Cecily, a daughter of Robert Sackville, 2nd Earl of Dorset, and (2) Mary, daughter of Sir George Browne of Balte.

== Notes ==
Peerage of England
| New creation | Baron Compton; 1572–1589 | Succeeded by William Compton |
