= William Compton, 1st Earl of Northampton =

English nobleman, peer and politician

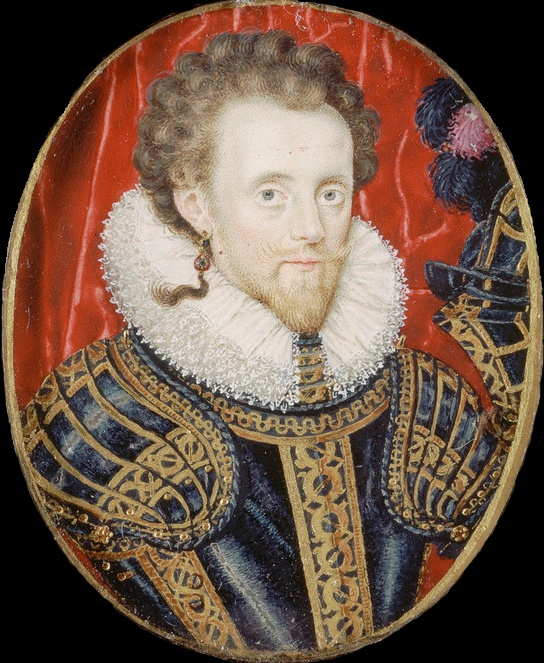
Portrait miniature of Sir William Compton as Baron Compton, c. 1600, by an unknown artist.

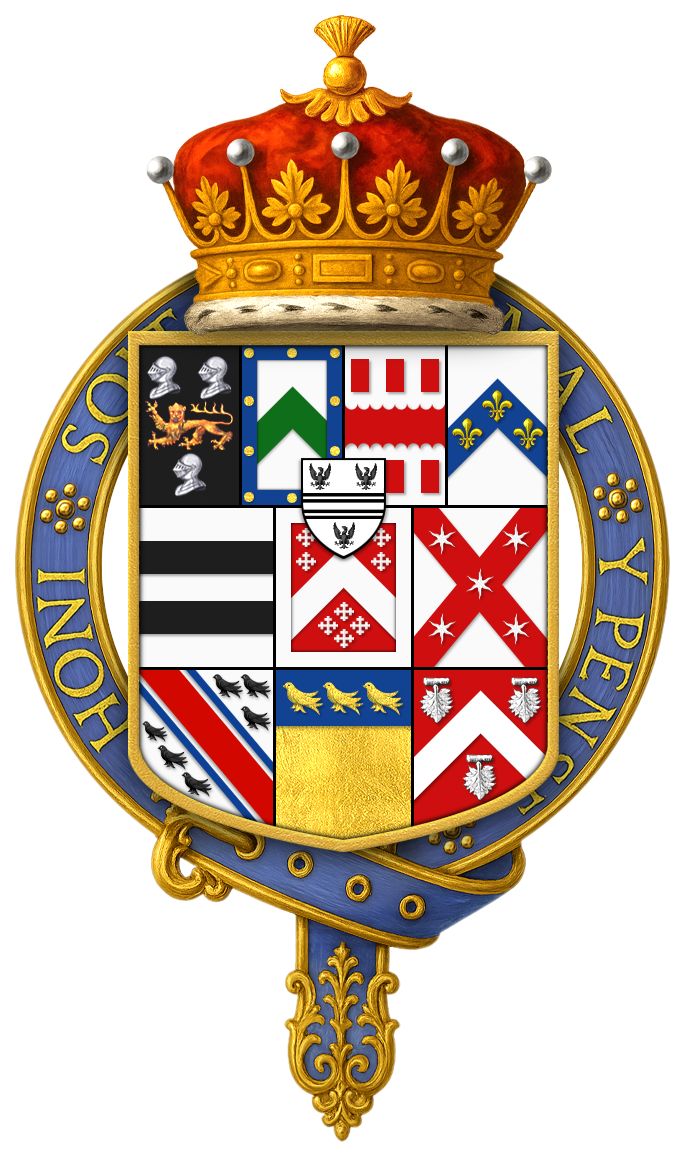
Arms of Sir William Compton, 1st Earl of Northampton, KG

William Compton, 1st Earl of Northampton, KG (born 1560, died 24 June 1630), known as 2nd Baron Compton from 1589 to 1618, was an English nobleman, peer, and politician.

== Career ==
Northampton was born in Compton Wynyates, Warwickshire and was the son of Henry Compton, 1st Baron Compton, and Frances Hastings. His maternal grandparents were Francis Hastings, 2nd Earl of Huntingdon and Catherine Pole. Catherine was a daughter of Henry Pole, 11th Baron Montacute and Lady Jane Nevill. Jane was in turn a daughter of George Nevill, 4th Baron Bergavenny and his wife Margaret, daughter of Hugh Fenn.

In June 1590 he went to Edinburgh with Edward Somerset, 4th Earl of Worcester to congratulate James VI on his marriage to Anne of Denmark. Compton watched 'pastimes' on the sand of Leith.

At the Union of the Crowns, in May 1603, Compton and others including Francis Norris and the Earl of Lincoln were sent by the Privy Council to Berwick-upon-Tweed to meet Anne of Denmark. On the way, they heard reports that she was delayed and unwell at Stirling Castle. There were (unfounded) rumours of plague at Berwick. Compton wrote to Lord Cecil that Lady Kildare had gone to Edinburgh alone.

He notably served as Lord Lieutenant of Warwickshire and of Gloucestershire and as Lord President of the Marches and of the Dominion of Wales. In 1618 he was created Earl of Northampton.

== Family ==
Lord Northampton married in 1599 or 1600 Elizabeth Spencer, a daughter of Sir John Spencer who had been Lord Mayor of London in 1594. Their children included:

- Anne Compton (d. 1675), married Ulick Burke, 1st Marquess of Clanricarde
- Spencer Compton, 2nd Earl of Northampton (1601–1643)

In March 1610 Elizabeth's father died leaving a fortune, and a letter (purportedly) sets out her expectations from her husband. These included; £1,600 per year and £600 for charitable works; three horses of her own; two gentlewomen attendants and horses for them; six or eight gentlemen; two coaches one for herself and another for her women each with a coachman and four horses, with carriages and carts for her things; twenty new gowns yearly; new furnishings in their houses including couches and canopies for her drawing chambers; he should finish building Castle Ashby House; and more signed "Eliza Compton".

== Prince Henry's tournament ==
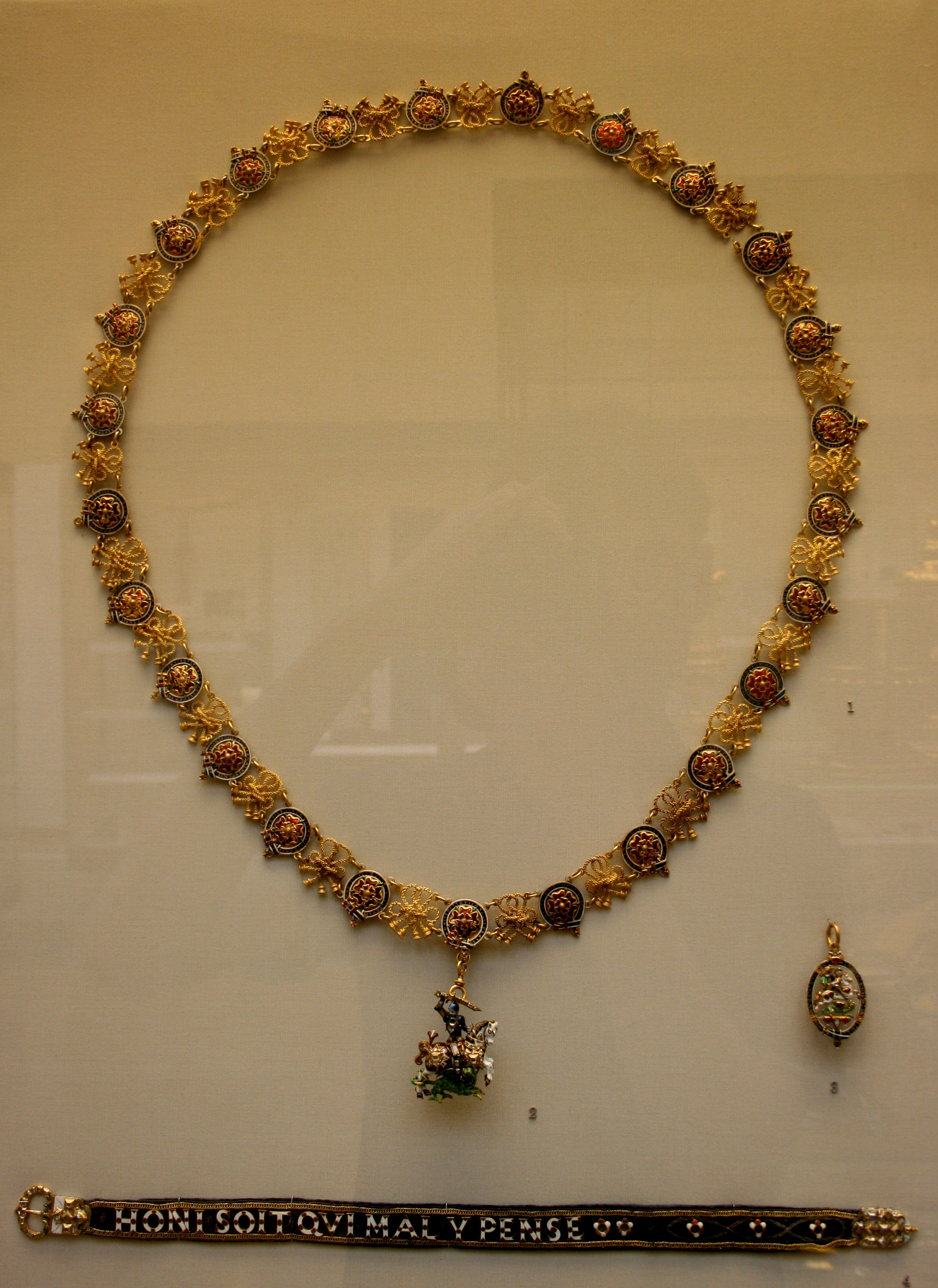
Order of Garter Insignia belonging to William Compton, 1st Earl of Northampton, now in the British Museum (1628-29)

William Compton was a participant in the Accession Day tilts or tournaments at the royal court from 1589. When Prince Henry was made Prince of Wales in 1610, William distinguished himself at the tournament. He dressed as a shepherd knight and sat in a specially constructed "mount" or bower to accept challenges. An eyewitness reported:

He builded himself a bower upon the top of the wall next to St. James's Park, made in the manner of a sheepcote, and there he sat in a gray russet cloak and had a sheep crook in one hand as though he had been a shepherd, and through the top of the bower there stood up the mast of a ship gilded with gold and upon the top a pan with fire burning in it, as some thought with pitch and an iron mark to mark sheep. ...
Afterward, my Lord Compton descended from his sheepcote and mounted himself on a lofty steed, his men also attending him on horseback, every one wearing a hat of straw and their faces painted as black as the devil.

The shepherd's bower was designed by Inigo Jones. The historian Roy Strong identifies this performance as a revival of Elizabethan pastoral themes, related to the shepherd knight Phillisides of Philip Sydney's Arcadia

== Armour ==
Lord Compton ordered a suit of plate armour from the Royal Greenwich Workshop around 1588, and was depicted wearing it in his only known portrait. The armour was depicted as having been heat blued and decorated with gold leaf. A team of researchers including blacksmith Ric Furrer and armourer Jeff Wasson reproduced the cuirass and placard of Lord Compton's armour for a 2017 Nova episode, "Secrets of the Shining Knight", and successfully tested it against a shot from a matchlock musket.

== Notes ==
Political offices
Vacant Title last held by The Earl of Warwick	Lord Lieutenant of Warwickshire; 1603–1630	Succeeded by The Earl of Northampton
Preceded by The Lord Chandos	Lord Lieutenant of Gloucestershire; 1622–1630	Succeeded by The Earl of Northampton
Preceded by The Lord Gerard	Lord President of Wales; Lord Lieutenant of Wales (less Glamorgan and Monmouthshire), Herefordshire, Shropshire and Worcestershire; 1617–1630	Succeeded by The Earl of Bridgewater
Preceded by The Earl of Worcester	Lord Lieutenant of Glamorgan and Monmouthshire; 1629–1630	Succeeded by The Earl of Bridgewater
Honorary titles
Preceded by Sir John Lewis	Custos Rotulorum of Cardiganshire; 1626–1630	Succeeded by Lord Vaughan
Peerage of England
New creation	Earl of Northampton; 5th creation 1618–1630	Succeeded by Spencer Compton
Preceded by Henry Compton	Baron Compton (descended by acceleration); 1589–1626	Succeeded by Spencer Compton
