= Tamworth by-election =

Tamworth by-election may refer to one of the following by-elections:

Australia

- 2001 Tamworth state by-election

United Kingdom

- 1871 Tamworth by-election, following the elevation to the peerage of Henry Bulwer
- 1872 Tamworth by-election, following the death of John Peel
- 1878 Tamworth by-election, following the resignation of Robert William Hanbury
- 1909 Tamworth by-election, following the death of Sir Philip Muntz
- 1917 Tamworth by-election, following the appointment of Francis Newdegate as Governor of Tasmania
- 1922 Tamworth by-election, following the death of Henry Wilson-Fox
- 1929 Tamworth by-election, following the resignation of Sir Edward Iliffe
- 1935 Tamworth by-election, following the death of Sir Arthur Steel-Maitland
- 2023 Tamworth by-election, following the resignation of Chris Pincher

== See also ==
- 1996 South East Staffordshire by-election in a constituency that included Tamworth, UK
