= Rowland Richard Robbins =

Rowland Richard Robbins (1872–1960) was an English farmer, known for market gardening on a large scale, and also for involvement in farming affairs at a national level.

== Life ==
He was the son of Rowland Robbins of "Willersey", Hounslow, "a little house in what was then the verge of the countryside at Hounslow", he having named his house after his birthplace, Willersey, in the Cotswolds. His father, of "humble parentage", left his birthplace for London, first to work as confidential clerk to the banker Sir John Lubbock, but finding this insufficiently well-paid became a "fashionable greengrocer" based at Knightsbridge and Kensington, and with his wife Caroline (née Ebbs) had nine children. He was educated at Taunton School.

"The youngest son of a lower-middle-class family of seven", and thus lacking prospects in his father's business because of his elder brothers, Robbins went into farming at Sipson west of London, with Thomas Wild (1848–1932), who was ailing, as senior partner. Robbins had worked with his brother in the family business based just off Chiswick High Street, and the farm concentrated on market gardening, send fruit and vegetables by rail to Covent Garden and further. It was a sustained commercial success. The company of Wild & Robbins invested in tractors from Wallis & Steevens in 1902, which at that time were limited to 2.7 tonnes (2.7 long tons; 3.0 short tons) by the Locomotives on Highways Act 1896.

In 1914 Robbins described the farm as of 315 acres (127 ha), and employing 148 people. He was on Middlesex County Council from 1913 to 1928, and was awarded the CBE in 1920.

== Politics and farming ==
The period starting in 1920 has been described as an "agricultural crisis" in the United Kingdom, and Robbins was a major figure in it. A meeting between Robbins and the minister for agriculture, which prepared an official meeting on 7 June 1921, played an important role in subsequent events.

Robbins was a member of the Agricultural Wages Board, from 1917 to 1921, and from 1924 to 1931. He was President of the National Farmers' Union of England and Wales (NFU) in 1921, having joined the NFU and its Fruit and Garden Committee in 1918; and then again in 1925. In the NFU Robbins, with the like-minded Thomas Howard Ryland, President in 1924 and son-in-law of Sir Frederick Howard, and Ernest Wilfred Langford, represented a new group of farmers' representatives pro-active in dealing with government, compared to predecessors Colin Campbell and Francis Herbert Padwick. On the other side of the debates were Conservatives around the Unionist Social Reform Committee and Lord Milner.

The wartime Corn Production Act 1917 which had fixed grain prices was replaced, and Robbins was involved in the negotiation under which the government compensated for lost subsidies on wheat and oats by research spending. This was the period called by some the "great betrayal", in which the Agriculture Act 1920 was repealed. The government hoped to gain farmers' support by closing down the Agricultural Wages Board and so removing minimum wages in agriculture. Sir Arthur Griffith-Boscawen, the responsible minister, approached Robbins in mid-1921 for secret meetings. Robbins's dealings with Griffith-Boscawen that summer impressed both the minister with the farmers' flexibility, and the NFU Council representing the farmers' interests, but cost him his health for a period.

Under the First MacDonald ministry the Agricultural Wages Board was restored, after some years in which agricultural wages had fallen. Following a strike in Norfolk, the government brokered a compromise deal between the NFU and the National Union of Agricultural and Allied Workers in April 1924.

Robbins objected to the establishment of the Milk Marketing Board, as proposed at an Annual General Meeting of the NFU Council by Sidney Wear after the Grigg Commission had reported, and resigned from it, with Ryland. At this point in the early 1930s the attitude ingrained in the "Union fundamentalists" like Robbins, that farmers were better off without government intervention, was being eclipsed.
