= Tamworth (constituency) =

UK Parliament constituency (since 1997)

Coordinates: 52.65°N 1.735°W

- County constituency for the House of Commons
- Boundaries since 2024
- Boundary of Tamworth in West Midlands region
- County: Staffordshire
- Electorate: 72,544 (December 2010)
- Major settlements: Tamworth, Fazeley, Wilnecote

Current constituency
- Created: 1997
- Member of Parliament: Sarah Edwards
- Seats: One
- Created from: South East Staffordshire

1885–1945
- Seats: One
- Type of constituency: County constituency

1567–1885
- Seats: Two
- Type of constituency: Borough constituency

Tamworth is a constituency (Note: A county constituency (for the purposes of election expenses and type of returning officer)) represented in the House of Commons of the UK Parliament, based on the town of Tamworth in Staffordshire, England. The seat is currently represented by Sarah Edwards of the Labour Party, re-elected in the UK 2024 general election.

== Constituency profile ==
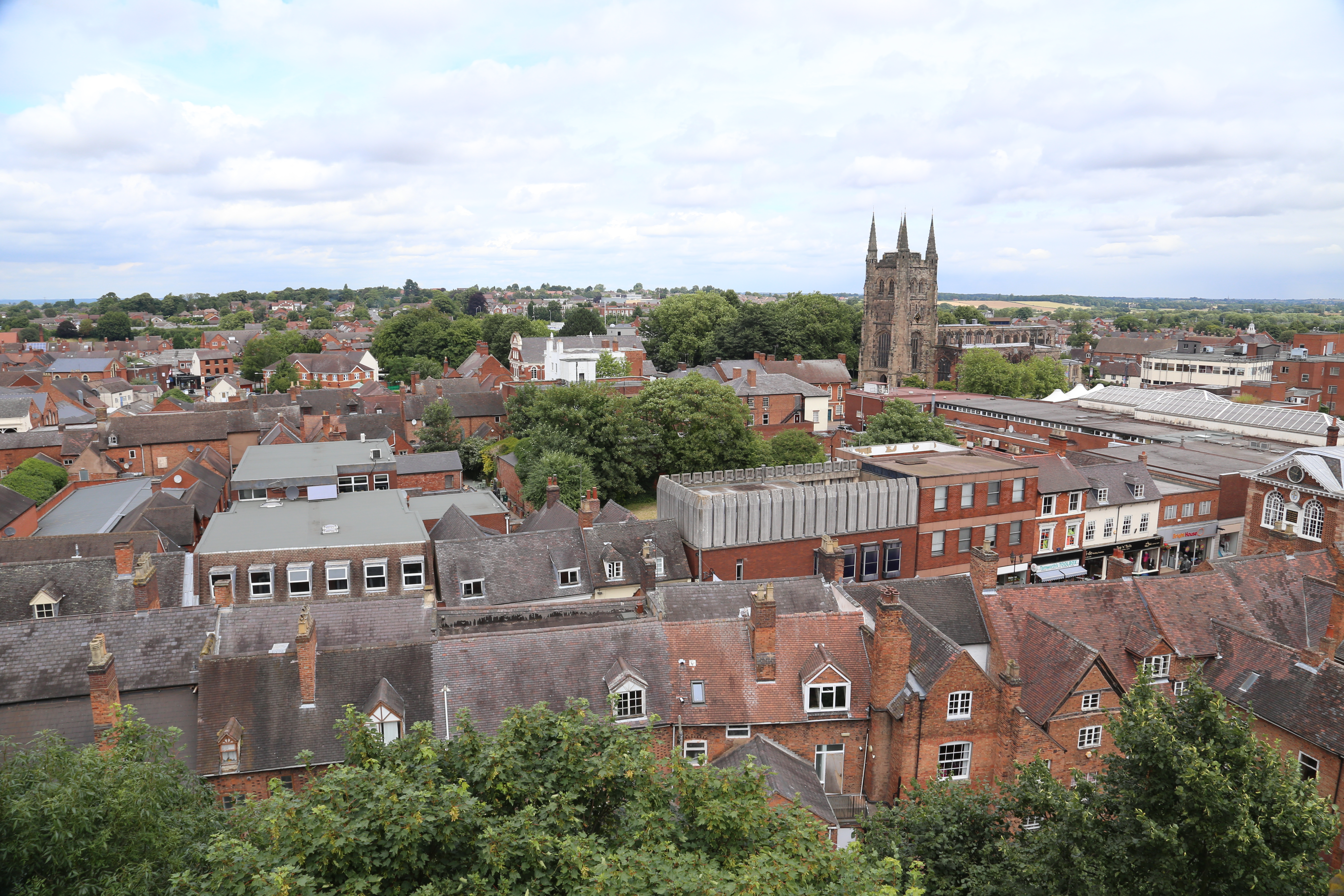
Tamworth

Tamworth is a constituency in Staffordshire in the West Midlands region of England. It is named after its main settlement, the town of Tamworth, which has a population of around 78,000. Other settlements include the town of Fazeley adjacent to Tamworth and the outlying villages of Whittington, Shenstone and Little Aston.

Tamworth is a historic market town that served as the capital of the Anglo-Saxon Kingdom of Mercia. The town more than doubled in population during the 1960s and 1970s when many new housing developments were built to accommodate overspill from Birmingham, which is located around 14 miles (23 km) to the south-west. Fazeley is a small industrial town with a history of textile manufacturing. This constituency has average levels of wealth overall; central Tamworth has some deprivation with many residents living in terraced houses whilst the outer suburbs and rural areas are more affluent. House prices here are generally higher than the rest of the West Midlands but lower than the UK average.

Residents of Tamworth have a similar age profile to the rest of the country but with a marginally higher retired population. They have average rates of income and high levels of homeownership. The child poverty rate is in line with the UK-wide rate. Residents generally have low levels of education and a high proportion work in the retail, manufacturing and transport sectors. The percentage of residents claiming unemployment benefits is low. White people made up 95% of the population at the 2021 census.

At the local borough council, most of this constituency is represented by the Labour Party, however Reform UK won all Tamworth seats at the more recent county and borough council elections in 2025 and 2026 respectively. Voters in Tamworth strongly supported leaving the European Union in the 2016 referendum; an estimated 66% voted in favour of Brexit compared to the UK-wide figure of 52%.

== Boundaries ==
1885–1918: The Municipal Borough of Birmingham, the Sessional Divisions of Birmingham and Solihull, part of the Sessional Divisions of Atherstone and Coleshill, and part of the Municipal Borough of Tamworth.

1918–1945: The Municipal Borough of Sutton Coldfield, the Rural Districts of Meriden and Solihull, and part of the Rural District of Tamworth.

1997–2010: The Borough of Tamworth, and the District of Lichfield wards of Bourne Vale, Fazeley, Little Aston, Mease Valley, Shenstone, Stonnall, and Tame.

2010–2024: The Borough of Tamworth, and the District of Lichfield wards of Bourne Vale, Fazeley, Little Aston, Mease and Tame, Shenstone, and Stonnall.

2024–present: Further to the 2023 Periodic Review of Westminster constituencies which came into effect for the 2024 general election, the constituency comprises the following (as they existed on 1 December 2020):

- The District of Lichfield wards of: Bourne Vale; Fazeley; Little Aston & Stonnall; Mease Valley; Shenstone; Whittington & Streethay (excluding the parish of Streethay).
- The Borough of Tamworth.

Minor adjustments to the boundary with Lichfield.

== History ==
The present Tamworth Constituency, a county constituency, replaced the old South East Staffordshire constituency for the 1997 general election.

A previous Tamworth constituency existed from 1563 until it was abolished for the 1945 general election. It was a borough constituency that elected two MPs until the 1885 general election, when it was reincarnated as a single-MP constituency in the county of Warwickshire by the Redistribution of Seats Act 1885.

=== Political history ===
Since its 1997 recreation the seat has been a bellwether, reflecting the largest party in terms of seats in the House of Commons with the largest share of the vote for the candidate locally. However, the seat has heavily trended towards the Conservatives in the general elections up to 2019, with majorities in excess of 10,000 in both 2015 and 2017 and almost 20,000 in 2019.

In the October 2023 by-election caused by the resignation of Chris Pincher (Conservative), Sarah Edwards (Labour) was elected. The results were videoed. Whilst it was a 24% swing to Labour, the turnout was a comparatively low 35%.

In the 2024 general election, Eddie Hughes stood as the Conservative candidate; he was the incumbent MP for Walsall North, which had been abolished as a result of the 2023 boundary review. Edwards retained the seat with a slightly increased margin in numerical terms, but a lower percentage margin (3.1% versus 5.1%) due to the higher turnout.

=== Prominent members ===
The Prime Minister and leader of the breakaway Tory group, the Peelites, Sir Robert Peel, represented the area for a long period 1830–1850, as did his father, brother and son at different periods. His father and son, also named Robert, also shared the baronetcy gained by his father, which gave them the automatic right to the style "Sir".

== Members of Parliament ==
=== MPs before 1660 ===
Parliament	First member	Second member
1275–1559	No representation or records	
1563–1567	Michael Harcourt	Robert Harcourt
1571	Edward Lewknor	John Bullock
1572–1583	Lancelot Bostock	John Nuttall
1584–1585	John Breton	Clement Fisher
1586–1587	Walter Bagot	John Ferrers
1588–1589	Sir Edward Devereux	Robert Wright
1593	John Ferrers	Thomas Smith
1597–1598	William Temple	George Hyde
1601	George Egeock	Robert Burdett
1604	Sir Percival Willoughby; Chose to sit for Nottinghamshire, replaced by Sir Thomas Beaumont	John Ferrers
1614	Sir Thomas Roe	Sir Percival Willoughby
1621	Sir Thomas Puckering	John Ferrar
1624–1625	John Woodford	John Wightwick
1625	Sir Thomas Puckering	Sir Richard Skeffington
1626	Sir Thomas Puckering	Sir Walter Devereux
1628–1629	Sir Thomas Puckering	Sir Walter Devereux
1629–1640	No Parliaments summoned	
1640 (Apr)	Sir Simon Archer	George Abbot
1640 (Nov)	Ferdinando Stanhope (Royalist), killed 1643	Henry Wilmot (Royalist), expelled 1641.
1645	George Abbot (Parliamentarian)	Sir Peter Wentworth (Parliamentarian)
1648	George Abbot (Parliamentarian)	Sir Peter Wentworth (Parliamentarian)
1653	Tamworth not represented in Barebone's Parliament	
1654	Tamworth not represented in 1st Protectorate Parliament	
1656	Tamworth not represented in 2nd Protectorate Parliament	
1659	Maj. Gen. Tobias Bridge	Edward Keeling

=== MPs 1660–1885 ===
Year	First member	First party	Second member	Second party
1660	Richard Newdigate		Thomas Fox	
1661	Amos Walrond		John Swinfen	
1669	John Ferrers		John Swinfen	
1670	John Boyle, Lord Clifford		John Swinfen	
Feb 1679	Sir Thomas Thynne, Bt		John Swinfen	
Aug 1679	Sir Thomas Thynne, Bt		Sir Andrew Hacket	
1681	Sir Thomas Thynne, Bt		John Swinfen	
1685	Richard Howe		Sir Henry Gough	
Jan 1689	Henry Sidney		Sir Henry Gough	
May 1689	Henry Boyle		Sir Henry Gough	
1690	Michael Biddulph		Sir Henry Gough	
1695	Thomas Guy		Sir Henry Gough	
1698	Thomas Guy		John Chetwynd	
1699	Thomas Guy		Sir Henry Gough	
1701	Thomas Guy		Henry Thynne	
1702	Thomas Guy		Joseph Girdler	
1708	Richard Swinfen		Joseph Girdler	
1710	Samuel Bracebridge		Joseph Girdler	
1715	Samuel Bracebridge		William Inge	
1722	Samuel Bracebridge		Francis Willoughby	
1723	Richard Swinfen		Francis Willoughby	
Jan 1727	Hon. George Compton		Francis Willoughby	
Aug 1727	William O'Brien, 4th Earl of Inchiquin	Whig	Hon. Thomas Willoughby	Tory
1734	Lord John Sackville		Hon. George Compton	
1735	Lord John Sackville		Charles Cotes	
1741	Lord John Sackville		John Floyer	
1742	Lord John Sackville		Charles Cotes	
1747	Hon. Thomas Villiers		Sir Henry Harpur	
1748	Hon. Thomas Villiers		Sir Robert Burdett	
1756	Hon. Thomas Villiers		Viscount Villiers	
1765	Hon. Thomas Villiers		Edward Thurlow	
Mar 1768	William de Grey		Edward Thurlow	
Nov 1768	Charles Vernon		Edward Thurlow	
1774	Thomas de Grey		Edward Thurlow	
1778	Thomas de Grey		Anthony Chamier	
Sep 1780	John Courtenay		Anthony Chamier	
Nov 1780	John Courtenay		John Calvert	
1784	John Courtenay		John Calvert II	
1790	John Courtenay		Sir Robert Peel	Tory
1796	Thomas Carter		Sir Robert Peel	Tory
1802	William Loftus		Sir Robert Peel	Tory
1812	Lord Charles Townshend	Whig	Sir Robert Peel	Tory
1818	William Yates Peel	Tory	Sir Robert Peel	Tory
1820	William Yates Peel	Tory	Lord Charles Townshend	Whig
1830	Sir Robert Peel, 2nd Bt	Tory	Lord Charles Townshend	Whig
1834	Sir Robert Peel, 2nd Bt	Conservative	Lord Charles Townshend	Whig
1835	Sir Robert Peel, 2nd Bt	Conservative	William Yates Peel	Conservative
1837	Sir Robert Peel, 2nd Bt	Conservative	Edward Henry A'Court	Conservative
1846	Sir Robert Peel, 2nd Bt	Peelite	Edward Henry A'Court	Conservative
Jul 1847	Sir Robert Peel, 2nd Bt	Peelite	William Yates Peel	Conservative
Dec 1847	Sir Robert Peel, 2nd Bt	Peelite	John Townshend	Whig
1850	Sir Robert Peel, 3rd Bt	Peelite	John Townshend	Whig
1856	Sir Robert Peel, 3rd Bt	Peelite	John Townshend	Whig
1859	Sir Robert Peel, 3rd Bt	Liberal	John Townshend	Liberal
1863	Sir Robert Peel, 3rd Bt	Liberal	John Peel	Liberal
1868	Sir Robert Peel, 3rd Bt	Liberal	Sir Henry Bulwer	Liberal
1871	Sir Robert Peel, 3rd Bt	Liberal	John Peel	Liberal
1872	Sir Robert Peel, 3rd Bt	Liberal	Robert William Hanbury	Conservative
1878	Sir Robert Peel, 3rd Bt	Liberal	Hamar Bass	Liberal
1880	Jabez Balfour	Liberal	Hamar Bass	Liberal

=== MPs 1885–1945 ===
Tamworth was reduced to having one member in 1885.

Year	Member	Whip
1885	Philip Muntz	Conservative
1909	Sir Francis Newdegate	Conservative
1917	Henry Wilson-Fox	Unionist
1922	Sir Percy Newson	Unionist
1923	Sir Edward Iliffe	Unionist
1929	Sir Arthur Steel-Maitland	Unionist
1935	Sir John Mellor	Conservative

The seat was abolished in 1945.

=== MPs since 1997 ===
South East Staffordshire prior to 1997

Election	Member	Party
1997	Brian Jenkins	Labour
2010	Chris Pincher	Conservative
2022	Chris Pincher	Independent
2023 by-election	Sarah Edwards	Labour

== Elections ==
=== Elections in the 2020s ===
General election 2024: Tamworth
Party	Candidate	Votes	%	±%
Labour	Sarah Edwards	15,338	35.0	+11.7
Conservative	Eddie Hughes	13,956	31.9	−34.8
Reform	Ian Cooper	11,004	25.1	N/A
Green	Sue Howarth	1,579	3.6	+1.5
Liberal Democrats	Jed Marson	1,451	3.3	−2.0
UKIP	Robert Bilcliff	290	0.7	−1.0
Workers Party	Adam Goodfellow	170	0.4	N/A
Majority		1,382	3.1	N/A
Turnout		43,788	58.3	▼6.5
Labour gain from Conservative		Swing	▲23.4	

- Changes in vote share are based on the 2019 general election result, not the 2023 by-election result.

2023 Tamworth by-election
Party	Candidate	Votes	%	±%
Labour	Sarah Edwards	11,719	45.8	▲22.1
Conservative	Andrew Cooper	10,403	40.7	▼25.6
Reform	Ian Cooper	1,373	5.4	New
Britain First	Ashlea Simon	580	2.3	New
UKIP	Robert Bilcliff	436	1.7	▼0.1
Green	Sue Howarth	417	1.6	▼0.4
Liberal Democrats	Sunny Virk	417	1.6	▼3.7
Monster Raving Loony	Howling Laud Hope	155	0.6	New
Independent	Peter Longman	86	0.3	New
Majority		1,316	5.1	N/A
Turnout		25,586	35.9	▼28.4
Labour gain from Conservative		Swing	▲23.9	

=== Elections in the 2010s ===
General election 2019: Tamworth
Party	Candidate	Votes	%	±%
Conservative	Chris Pincher	30,542	66.3	▲5.3
Labour Co-op	Chris Bain	10,908	23.7	▼11.1
Liberal Democrats	Rob Wheway	2,426	5.3	▲1.1
Green	Andrew Tilley	935	2.0	New
UKIP	Robert Bilcliff	814	1.8	New
Independent	John Wright	431	0.9	New
Majority		19,634	42.6	▲16.4
Turnout		46,066	64.3	▼1.8
Conservative hold		Swing	▲8.2	

General election 2017: Tamworth
Party	Candidate	Votes	%	±%
Conservative	Chris Pincher	28,748	61.0	▲11.0
Labour	Andrew Hammond	16,401	34.8	▲8.7
Liberal Democrats	Jennifer Pinkett	1,961	4.2	▲1.2
Majority		12,347	26.2	▲2.3
Turnout		47,110	66.1	▲0.5
Conservative hold		Swing	▲1.1	

General election 2015: Tamworth
Party	Candidate	Votes	%	±%
Conservative	Chris Pincher	23,606	50.0	▲4.2
Labour	Carol Dean	12,304	26.1	▼6.6
UKIP	Janet Higgins	8,727	18.5	▲13.6
Liberal Democrats	Jennifer Pinkett	1,427	3.0	▼13.2
Green	Nicola Holmes	1,110	2.4	New
Majority		11,302	23.9	▲10.8
Turnout		47,174	65.6	▲1.8
Conservative hold		Swing	▲5.4	

General election 2010: Tamworth
Party	Candidate	Votes	%	±%
Conservative	Chris Pincher	21,238	45.8	▲8.7
Labour	Brian Jenkins	15,148	32.7	▼10.3
Liberal Democrats	Jennifer Pinkett	7,516	16.2	▲2.1
UKIP	Steven Fowler	2,253	4.9	▲2.1
Christian	Charlene Detheridge	235	0.5	New
Majority		6,090	13.1	N/A
Turnout		46,390	63.8	▲2.8
Conservative gain from Labour		Swing	▲9.5	

=== Elections in the 2000s ===
General election 2005: Tamworth
Party	Candidate	Votes	%	±%
Labour	Brian Jenkins	18,801	43.0	▼6.0
Conservative	Chris Pincher	16,232	37.1	▼0.5
Liberal Democrats	Phil Bennion	6,175	14.1	▲2.4
Veritas	Patrick Eston	1,320	3.0	New
UKIP	Tom Simpson	1,212	2.8	▲1.1
Majority		2,569	5.9	▼6.5
Turnout		43,740	61.0	▲3.2
Labour hold		Swing	▼2.8	

General election 2001: Tamworth
Party	Candidate	Votes	%	±%
Labour	Brian Jenkins	19,722	49.0	▼2.8
Conservative	Luise Gunter	15,124	37.6	▲0.9
Liberal Democrats	Jennifer Pinkett	4,721	11.7	▲3.6
UKIP	Paul Sootheran	683	1.7	▲1.0
Majority		4,598	11.4	▼3.7
Turnout		40,250	57.8	▼16.4
Labour hold		Swing	▼1.8	

=== Elections in the 1990s ===
General election 1997: Tamworth
Party	Candidate	Votes	%	±%
Labour	Brian Jenkins	25,808	51.8	
Conservative	Lady Lightbown	18,312	36.7	
Liberal Democrats	Jennifer Pinkett	4,025	8.1	
Referendum	Dianne Livesey	1,163	2.3	
UKIP	Christopher Lamb	369	0.7	
Liberal	Catherine Twelvetrees	177	0.4	
Majority		7,496	15.1	
Turnout		49,854	74.2	
Labour win (new seat)				

== Elections 1918–1945 ==
=== Elections in the 1930s ===
Another general election was required to take place before the end of 1940. The political parties had been making preparations for an election to take place from 1939 and by the end of this year, the following candidates had been selected:

- Conservative: John Mellor
- Labour: Michael Patrick Fogarty

General election 1935: Tamworth
Party	Candidate	Votes	%	±%
Conservative	John Mellor	42,675	79.47	
Labour	John Yates	11,026	20.53	
Majority		31,649	58.94	
Turnout		53,701	64.72	
Conservative hold		Swing		

1935 Tamworth by-election
Party	Candidate	Votes	%	±%
Conservative	John Mellor	Unopposed	N/A	N/A
Conservative hold				

General election 1931: Tamworth
Party	Candidate	Votes	%	±%
Conservative	Arthur Steel-Maitland	41,571	84.67	
Labour	Joseph Willbery	7,525	15.33	
Majority		34,046	69.34	
Turnout		49,096	73.92	
Conservative hold		Swing		

=== Elections in the 1920s ===
1929 Tamworth by-election
Party	Candidate	Votes	%	±%
Unionist	Arthur Steel-Maitland	23,495	64.8	–2.6
Labour	George Horwill	12,759	35.2	+2.6
Majority		10,736	29.6	–5.2
Turnout		36,254	60.3	–13.3
Registered electors		60,087		
Unionist hold		Swing	–2.6	

General election 1929: Tamworth
Party	Candidate	Votes	%	±%
Unionist	Edward Iliffe	29,807	67.4	N/A
Labour	George Horwill	14,402	32.6	New
Majority		15,405	34.8	N/A
Turnout		44,209	73.6	N/A
Unionist hold		Swing		

General election 1924: Tamworth
Party	Candidate	Votes	%	±%
Unionist	Edward Iliffe	Unopposed	N/A	N/A
Unionist hold				

General election 1923: Tamworth
Party	Candidate	Votes	%	±%
Unionist	Edward Iliffe	Unopposed	N/A	N/A
Unionist hold				

General election 1922: Tamworth
Party	Candidate	Votes	%	±%
Unionist	Percy Newson	Unopposed	N/A	N/A
Unionist hold				

1922 Tamworth by-election
Party		Candidate	Votes	%	±%
C	Unionist	Percy Newson	14,732	68.8	N/A
	Labour	George Henry Jones	6,671	31.2	New
Majority			8,061	17.6	N/A
Turnout			21,403	60.0	N/A
	Unionist hold		Swing	N/A	
C indicates candidate endorsed by the coalition government.

=== Elections in the 1910s ===
General election 1918: Tamworth
Party		Candidate	Votes	%	±%
C	Unionist	Henry Wilson-Fox	Unopposed		
	Unionist hold				
C indicates candidate endorsed by the coalition government.

== Elections 1885–1918 ==
=== Elections in the 1910s ===
1917 Tamworth by-election
Party	Candidate	Votes	%	±%
Unionist	Henry Wilson-Fox	Unopposed		
Unionist hold				

General Election 1914–15:

Another General Election was required to take place before the end of 1915. The political parties had been making preparations for an election to take place and by July 1914, the following candidates had been selected:

- Unionist: Francis Newdegate
- Liberal:

General election December 1910: Tamworth
Party	Candidate	Votes	%	±%
Conservative	Francis Newdegate	Unopposed		
Conservative hold				

General election January 1910: Tamworth
Party	Candidate	Votes	%	±%
Conservative	Francis Newdegate	10,313	68.2	+7.2
Liberal	Charles Henry Brampton	4,799	31.8	–7.2
Majority		5,514	36.4	+14.4
Turnout		15,112	82.9	+2.8
Registered electors		18,228		
Conservative hold		Swing	+7.2	

=== Elections in the 1900s ===
1909 Tamworth by-election
Party	Candidate	Votes	%	±%
Conservative	Francis Newdegate	Unopposed		
Conservative hold				

General election 1906: Tamworth
Party	Candidate	Votes	%	±%
Conservative	Philip Muntz	7,561	61.0	N/A
Liberal	John Seymour Keay	4,842	39.0	New
Majority		2,719	22.0	N/A
Turnout		12,403	80.1	N/A
Registered electors		15,491		
Conservative hold		Swing	N/A	

General election 1900: Tamworth
Party	Candidate	Votes	%	±%
Conservative	Philip Muntz	Unopposed		
Conservative hold				

=== Elections in the 1890s ===
General election 1895: Tamworth
Party	Candidate	Votes	%	±%
Conservative	Philip Muntz	Unopposed		
Conservative hold				

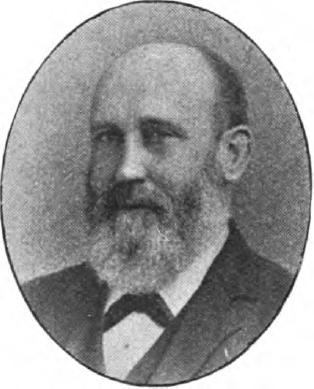
Johnson

General election 1892: Tamworth
Party	Candidate	Votes	%	±%
Conservative	Philip Muntz	5,128	65.5	N/A
Lib-Lab	William Johnson	2,702	34.5	New
Majority		2,426	31.0	N/A
Turnout		7,830	78.6	N/A
Registered electors		9,968		
Conservative hold		Swing	N/A	

=== Elections in the 1880s ===
General election 1886: Tamworth
Party	Candidate	Votes	%	±%
Conservative	Philip Muntz	Unopposed		
Conservative hold				

General election 1885: Tamworth
Party	Candidate	Votes	%	±%
Conservative	Philip Muntz	4,338	52.9	+25.9
Liberal	William Beale	3,858	47.1	–25.9
Majority		480	5.8	N/A
Turnout		8,196	81.6	–16.8 (est)
Registered electors		10,046		
Conservative gain from Liberal		Swing	+25.9	

== Elections 1868–1885 ==
=== Elections in the 1880s ===
General election 1880: Tamworth (2 seats)
Party	Candidate	Votes	%	±%
Liberal	Hamar Bass	1,409	41.4	+2.9
Liberal	Jabez Balfour	1,074	31.6	+24.2
Conservative	William Henry Worthington	920	27.0	−11.3
Majority		154	4.6	N/A
Turnout		2,329 (est)	98.4 (est)	+21.9
Registered electors		2,368		
Liberal hold		Swing	+4.3	
Liberal gain from Conservative		Swing	+14.9	

=== Elections in the 1870s ===
1878 Tamworth by-election (1 seat)
Party	Candidate	Votes	%	±%
Liberal	Hamar Bass	1,186	66.1	+20.2
Conservative	Francis Bridgeman	607	33.9	−4.4
Majority		579	32.2	N/A
Turnout		1,793	85.5	+9.0
Registered electors		2,096		
Liberal gain from Conservative		Swing	+12.3	

- Caused by Hanbury's resignation in order to contest the 1878 North Staffordshire by-election.

General election 1874: Tamworth (2 seats)
Party	Candidate	Votes	%	±%
Liberal	Robert Peel (3rd)	1,089	38.5	–2.6
Conservative	Robert William Hanbury	1,086	38.3	N/A
Lib-Lab	Henry Hawkes	448	15.8	N/A
Liberal	Charles Parker Butt	209	7.4	N/A
Turnout		1,416 (est)	76.5 (est)	–2.3
Registered electors		1,850		
Majority		3	0.2	–0.9
Liberal hold		Swing	N/A	
Majority		638	22.5	N/A
Conservative gain from Liberal		Swing	N/A	

By-election, 16 Apr 1872: Tamworth (1 seat)
Party	Candidate	Votes	%	±%
Conservative	Robert William Hanbury	946	74.5	New
Liberal	Robert Spencer Robinson	323	25.5	N/A
Majority		623	49.0	N/A
Turnout		1,269	72.6	–6.2
Registered electors		1,747		
Conservative gain from Liberal		Swing	N/A	

- Caused by John Peel's death.

By-election, 28 Mar 1871: Tamworth (1 seat)
Party	Candidate	Votes	%	±%
Liberal	John Peel	Unopposed		
Liberal hold				

- Caused by Butler's elevation to the peerage, becoming Lord Dalling and Bulwer.

=== Elections in the 1860s ===
General election 1868: Tamworth (2 seats)
Party	Candidate	Votes	%	±%
Liberal	Robert Peel (3rd)	1,136	41.1	–10.5
Liberal	Henry Bulwer	827	30.0	N/A
Liberal	John Peel	798	28.9	–6.7
Majority		29	1.1	–21.7
Turnout		1,381 (est)	78.8 (est)	–6.6
Registered electors		1,753		
Liberal hold		Swing	N/A	
Liberal hold		Swing	N/A	

== Elections 1832–1868 ==
=== Elections in the 1860s ===
General election 1865: Tamworth (2 seats)
Party	Candidate	Votes	%	±%
Liberal	Robert Peel (3rd)	416	51.6	+3.3
Liberal	John Peel	287	35.6	–4.8
Conservative	William Thomas Shave Daniel	103	12.8	+1.5
Majority		184	22.8	–7.3
Turnout		455 (est)	85.4 (est)	+0.9
Registered electors		532		
Liberal hold		Swing	+1.3	
Liberal hold		Swing	–2.8	

By-election, 12 October 1863: Tamworth
Party	Candidate	Votes	%	±%
Liberal	John Peel	224	57.3	–31.4
Liberal	Henry Cowper	167	42.7	+31.4
Majority		57	14.6	–14.5
Turnout		391	84.4	–0.1
Registered electors		463		
Liberal hold		Swing	–31.4	

Caused by Townshend's succession to the peerage, becoming 5th Marquess Townshend.

By-election, 31 July 1861: Tamworth
Party	Candidate	Votes	%	±%
Liberal	Robert Peel (3rd)	Unopposed		
Liberal hold				

- Caused by Peel's appointment as Chief Secretary to the Lord Lieutenant of Ireland.

=== Elections in the 1850s ===
General election 1859: Tamworth (2 seats)
Party	Candidate	Votes	%	±%
Liberal	Robert Peel (3rd)	341	48.3	N/A
Liberal	John Townshend	285	40.4	N/A
Conservative	William Thomas Shave Daniel	80	11.3	N/A
Majority		205	29.1	N/A
Turnout		393 (est)	84.5 (est)	N/A
Registered electors		465		
Liberal hold		Swing	N/A	
Liberal hold		Swing	N/A	

General election 1857: Tamworth (2 seats)
Party	Candidate	Votes	%	±%
Peelite	Robert Peel (3rd)	Unopposed		
Whig	John Townshend jnr.	Unopposed		
Registered electors		419		
Peelite hold				
Whig hold				

By-election, 7 February 1856: Tamworth
Party	Candidate	Votes	%	±%
Whig	John Townshend jnr.	Unopposed		
Whig hold				

- Caused by Townshend's elevation to the peerage, becoming Marquess of Townshend

By-election, 14 March 1855: Tamworth
Party	Candidate	Votes	%	±%
Peelite	Robert Peel (3rd)	Unopposed		
Peelite hold				

- Caused by Peel's appointment as a Civil Lord of the Admiralty.

General election 1852: Tamworth (2 seats)
Party	Candidate	Votes	%	±%
Peelite	Robert Peel (3rd)	Unopposed		
Whig	John Townshend snr.	Unopposed		
Registered electors		382		
Peelite hold				
Whig gain from Conservative				

By-election, 19 July 1850: Tamworth
Party	Candidate	Votes	%	±%
Peelite	Robert Peel (3rd)	Unopposed		
Peelite hold				

- Caused by Robert Peel's death.

=== Elections in the 1840s ===
By-election, 18 December 1847: Tamworth
Party	Candidate	Votes	%	±%
Whig	John Townshend snr.	Unopposed		
Whig gain from Conservative				

- Caused by William Yates Peel's resignation by accepting the office of Steward of the Chiltern Hundreds

General election 1847: Tamworth (2 seats)
Party	Candidate	Votes	%	±%
Peelite	Robert Peel (2nd)	Unopposed		
Conservative	William Yates Peel	Unopposed		
Registered electors		393		
Peelite gain from Conservative				
Conservative hold				

By-election, 13 September 1841: Tamworth
Party	Candidate	Votes	%	±%
Conservative	Robert Peel (2nd)	Unopposed		
Conservative hold				

- Caused by Peel's appointment as Prime Minister of the United Kingdom and First Lord of the Treasury

General election 1841: Tamworth (2 seats)
Party	Candidate	Votes	%	±%
Conservative	Robert Peel (2nd)	365	48.5	+1.1
Conservative	Edward Henry A'Court	241	32.0	+2.0
Whig	John Townshend snr.	147	19.5	–3.1
Majority		94	12.5	+5.1
Turnout		377 (est)	77.6 (est)	c. –11.7
Registered electors		485		
Conservative hold		Swing	+1.3	
Conservative hold		Swing	+1.8	

=== Elections in the 1830s ===
General election 1837: Tamworth (2 seats)
Party	Candidate	Votes	%
Conservative	Robert Peel (2nd)	387	47.4
Conservative	Edward Henry A'Court	245	30.0
Whig	John Townshend snr.	185	22.6
Majority		60	7.4
Turnout		444	89.3
Registered electors		497	
Conservative hold			
Conservative hold			

General election 1835: Tamworth (2 seats)
Party	Candidate	Votes	%
Conservative	Robert Peel (2nd)	Unopposed	
Conservative	William Yates Peel	Unopposed	
Registered electors		505	
Conservative hold			
Conservative gain from Whig			

General election 1832: Tamworth (2 seats)
Party	Candidate	Votes	%
Tory	Robert Peel (2nd)	Unopposed	
Whig	Charles Townshend	Unopposed	
Registered electors		586	
Tory hold			
Whig hold			

General election 1831: Tamworth (2 seats)
Party	Candidate	Votes	%
Tory	Robert Peel (2nd)	Unopposed	
Whig	Charles Townshend	Unopposed	
Tory hold			
Whig hold			

General election 1830: Tamworth (2 seats)
Party	Candidate	Votes	%
Tory	Robert Peel (2nd)	Unopposed	
Whig	Charles Townshend	Unopposed	
Tory hold			
Whig hold			

== See also ==
- List of parliamentary constituencies in Staffordshire
- List of parliamentary constituencies in West Midlands (region)

== Notes ==
Parliament of the United Kingdom
Vacant since 1827 Title last held by Seaford	Constituency represented by the prime minister 1834–1835	Vacant until 1841 Title next held by Tamworth
Vacant Title last held by Tamworth	Constituency represented by the prime minister 1841–1846	Succeeded by City of London
