= Sir Robert Peel, 3rd Baronet =

British Peelite and Member of Parliament (MP)

The Right Honourable Sir Robert Peel Bt GCB PC MP
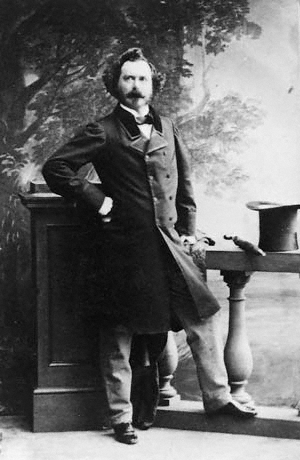
- Sir Robert Peel, Bt, by Camille Silvy.

Chief Secretary for Ireland
- In office 29 July 1861 – 7 December 1865
- Monarch: Victoria
- Prime Minister: The Viscount Palmerston
- Preceded by: Edward Cardwell
- Succeeded by: Chichester Fortescue

Personal details
- Born: 4 May 1822 London
- Died: 9 May 1895 (aged 73) Stratton Street, London
- Party: Peelite; Liberal
- Spouses: Lady Emily Hay; (1836–1924)
- Children: 5
- Parents: Sir Robert Peel; Julia Floyd
- Education: Christ Church, Oxford

Sir Robert Peel, 3rd Baronet, GCB, PC, MP (4 May 1822 – 9 May 1895), was a British Peelite, Liberal and from 1884 until 1886 Conservative Member of Parliament (MP).

Eldest son of the prime minister Robert Peel, he was educated at Harrow and Christ Church, Oxford, and entered the Diplomatic Service in 1844. He served as co-member for Tamworth, his father's constituency, from 1850 until 1880, for Huntingdon from 1884 and for Blackburn from 1885 to 1886.

He was appointed Irish secretary in 1861 in Palmerston's ministry, but in 1865, under Russell he was replaced by Chichester Fortescue. He was appointed a GCB in 1866.

His variety of parties and tendency not to toe the party line saw republication of a charge of moral want, volatility and "lack of dignity" from biographies written after his death, pre-Liberal landslide. One such, the Dictionary of National Biography (DNB) mentions signs of general profligacy and his rift from his wife.

== Background and education ==
Born in London on 4 May 1822, Peel was the eldest son of Sir Robert Peel, 2nd Baronet, the statesman, and Julia, daughter of Sir John Floyd, 1st Baronet. He went to Harrow School in February 1835. He matriculated from Christ Church, Oxford on 26 May 1841, but did not take a degree.

== Diplomatic career ==
Entering the diplomatic service, Peel became an attaché to the British legation at Madrid on 18 June 1844. He was promoted to be secretary of legation in Switzerland on 2 May 1846, and was chargé d'affaires there in November 1846. On his father's death, on 2 July 1850, and his own succession to the baronetcy, he resigned his office at Bern.

== Political career ==
Peel was elected member for his father's former constituency, Tamworth as a "liberal-conservative" (i.e. as one of the Peelites). He entered the House of Commons on 19 July 1850. The DNB (1895) summarises his political career thus:

... he had every opportunity open to him of taking a distinguished place in public life. He had a fine presence and gaiety of manner, and was popular in social life; while his oratorical gifts – a rich ringing voice, a perfect command of language, rare powers of irony, a capacity for producing unexpected rhetorical effects – ought to have rendered his success in parliament a certainty. But he used his abilities fitfully. The want of moral fibre in his volatile character, an absence of dignity, and an inability to accept a fixed political creed, prevented him from acquiring the confidence of his associates or of the public.

— George Clement Boase, Dictionary of National Biography (1895)

He remained the member for Tamworth until the 1880 election, in which he unsuccessfully stood as a Conservative for another constituency. Peel was returned as member in other constituencies in 1884 and 1885. He made a final unsuccessful parliamentary bid as a Liberal candidate in 1889.

=== Early appointments ===
In March 1855 Lord Palmerston, who had been Secretary of State for Foreign Affairs while Peel was in the diplomatic service, appointed him a junior Civil Lord of the Admiralty. Henceforth he was regarded as a Liberal, and his persistent advocacy of the liberation of Italy fully justified this view of his political opinions.

In July 1856 he acted as secretary to Lord Granville's special mission to Russia at the coronation of Alexander II. On 5 January 1857, during a lecture delivered at the opening of the new library at Adderley Park, near Birmingham, he spoke discourteously of the Russian court and the court officials. The lecture, severely commented on by the Russian and French press, was the subject of a parliamentary debate, and caused great annoyance to the English court.

=== Secretary for Ireland ===
Nevertheless, on Palmerston's return to power, he, on 26 July 1861, made Peel Chief Secretary for Ireland and a privy councillor. In this position his careless good humour pleased the Irish and the prime minister, and he almost thought he had solved the Irish question when he made excursions incognito through the country on a jaunting-car and interviewed the peasants. His speeches were very optimistic; but, before his connection with the castle ended, Fenianism came to a head. Irish debates became more embittered, and his replies and speeches in parliament lacked discretion and were not calculated to promote peace. In February 1862 he received a challenge from the O'Donoghue, but the matter was brought before the commons on 25 February and was adjusted. Although he took a warm interest in some Irish questions, especially higher education, which he had aided by a handsome contribution to the Queen's Colleges founded by his father, his career in Ireland was a failure. When the Liberal government was reconstituted, after the death of Lord Palmerston, by Lord John Russell, to whom Peel's failings were peculiarly obnoxious his post was filled by Chichester Fortescue and he did not again hold office. On 5 January 1866 he was created Knight Grand Cross of the Order of the Bath (GCB).

=== Parliamentarian without post ===
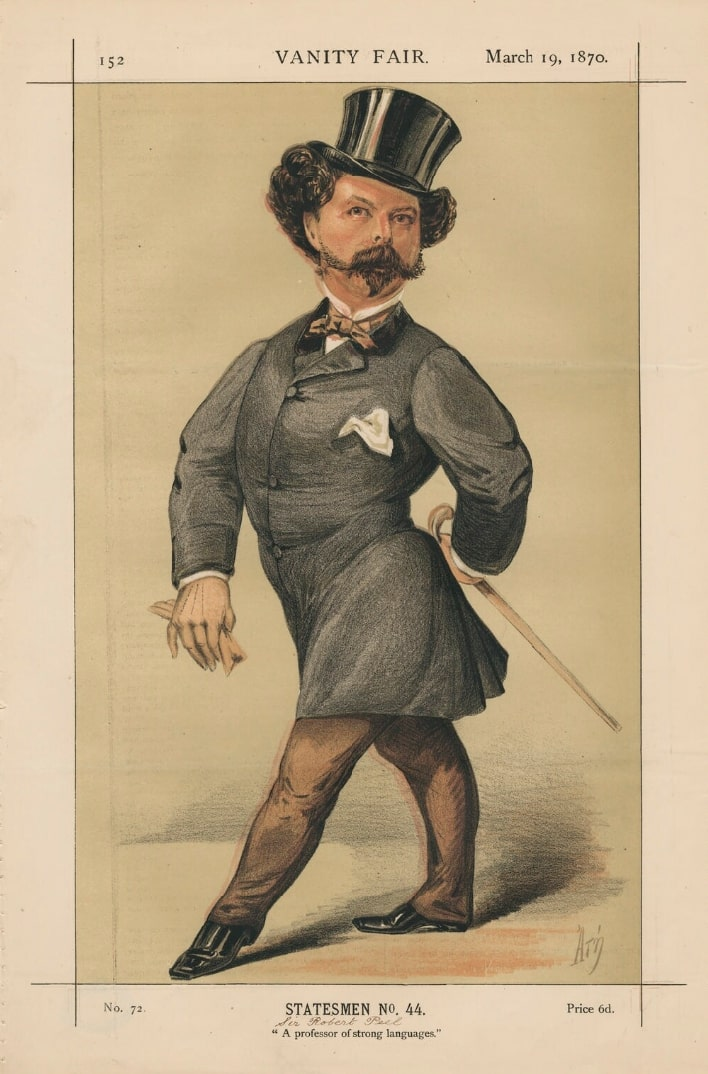
"A professor of strong languages" Peel as caricatured in Vanity Fair, March 1870

Peel continued to sit for Tamworth as a Liberal, but was often a severe critic of Mr. Gladstone's policy. In 1871 he gave a remarkable proof of his eloquence by describing to the House the rout, which he had himself witnessed, of the French army of General Bourbaki, and its flight over the Swiss frontier in the depth of winter during the Franco-Prussian War. In 1874 he for a second time christened himself a liberal-conservative; and when the eastern question, during Lord Beaconsfield's administration, came to the front, he wholly separated himself from the followers of Gladstone.

=== Other constituencies ===
Peel did not stand for Tamworth at the general election in 1880 but unsuccessfully contested Gravesend in the conservative interest; and his voice was often heard on Conservative platforms, denouncing the action of the Liberal administration in Egypt and Ireland. In The Times of 8 May 1880 he published a letter, in which he recounted the offers from various governments of honours and offices which he had refused.

On 21 March 1884 he was returned as a Conservative member for Huntingdon. When that borough was disfranchised, he was, in November 1885, returned for Blackburn. On the critical division on the second reading of the Home Rule Bill, on 7 June 1886, he abstained from voting.

At the general election in the following July, Peel contested the Inverness Burghs for the Liberal party against a Liberal Unionist who had broken with his party on the issue of Home Rule. Peel was not successful. Subsequently, with characteristic impetuosity, he threw himself into the home rule agitation as a supporter of the Irish demands, and at a by-election in 1889 was the Liberal candidate for Brighton, duly advocating (Irish) home rule. Neither of the incumbents returned had been Liberals since the election of 1880 but the by-election was expected to be a closer affair, and polling 39.3% of the vote, he decided not to stand again to be an MP.

== Other activities ==
On 24 April 1854 Peel was shipwrecked off the coast of Genoa in the SS Ercolano, and only saved his life by swimming ashore on some portion of the wreck. From 29 March 1854 to 1859 he served as a captain in the Staffordshire Yeomanry. From about 1856 Peel was extensively engaged in horse racing under the name of Mr. F. Robinson; and later had an establishment at Bonehill, near Tamworth, where he bred horses.

== Family ==
Peel married Lady Emily Hay, seventh daughter of George Hay, 8th Marquess of Tweeddale, on 13 January 1856. (Note: Burke's Peerage has 17 January 1856 for the marriage.) They had a son and four daughters:

- Twin daughters were born in 1860 –
  - Gwendolin Cecilia. (In 1896, she married a captain of the Prussian Army, Victor von Muller); and
  - Agnes Helen (1860–1964). Agnes wrote a book Arctic Gleans about her travel. She married twice: Daniel von der Heydt (1866–1911) on 22 November 1894 by whom she had a daughter; and on 25 June 1919, Arthur Gilstrap Soames (1854–1934; died without issue). Soames was the uncle of Olave Baden-Powell (née Soames), the World Chief Guide.
- Another daughter followed, Victoria Alexandrina Julia (1865–1935; married Daniel F. P. Barton in 1887); then a son,
- Robert (1867–1925), who succeeded to the baronetcy in 1895; and lastly, another daughter,
- Evelyn Emily (1869–1960; in 1901, married James William Ronald Macleay, first secretary of the diplomatic service at Brussels).

== Later life and death ==
His father's fine collection of 77 pictures and 18 drawings, including Chapeau de Poil by Rubens, he sold to the National Gallery in March 1871 for £75,000 (equivalent to about £7,600,000 in 2025). According to The Great Landowners of Great Britain and Ireland of 1883, he owned 9,923 acres (40 km^{2}) across Staffordshire, Warwickshire, and Lancashire yielding an annual rent of £24,532. However, in later life his private circumstances, a reckless extravagance and rift from his wife, meant he ceased to live at Drayton Manor, Staffordshire. These circumstances made him a stranger there in his final years.

His last public appearance was the week before his death, attending St James's Hall to protest atrocities in Armenia. The Times wrote his obituary to include a statement that his death "left no gap in English public life ... his career has closed in disappointment and futility." It added "he had much of his great father's impressive dignity, though without any of his stiffness, for which, indeed, he substituted a Bohemian easiness of manner."

On 9 May 1895, aged 73, Peel died from a brain hæmorrhage. He was found dead in his bedroom at 12 Stratton Street, London. His valet had to enter his room via a window and summoned his doctor from Harley Street. He was buried at Drayton Bassett's Anglican church on 16 May. His probate was sworn that year at £9,568 (equivalent to about £1,100,000 in 2025). His son Robert succeeded in the baronetcy. Lady Peel died in April 1924 in Florence at the age of 88.

== Notes ==
Parliament of the United Kingdom
Preceded by Sir Robert Peel; John Townshend	Member of Parliament for Tamworth; 1850–1880; With: John Townshend, to 1856; Viscount Raynham 1856–1863; John Peel 1863–1868; Sir Henry Bulwer 1868–1871; John Peel 1871–1872; Robert William Hanbury 1872–1878; Hamar Bass from 1878	Succeeded by Jabez Spencer Balfour
Preceded by Viscount Hinchingbrooke	Member of Parliament for Huntingdon; 1884–1885	Succeeded by Thomas Coote
Preceded by Sir William Coddington, Bt; William Edward Briggs	Member of Parliament for Blackburn; 1885–1886; With: Sir William Coddington, Bt	Succeeded by Sir William Coddington, Bt; Sir William Henry Hornby
Political offices
Preceded by Hon. William Cowper	Civil Lord of the Admiralty; 1855–1857	Succeeded by Thomas Baring
Preceded by Edward Cardwell	Chief Secretary for Ireland; 1861–1865	Succeeded by Chichester Fortescue
Baronetage of Great Britain
Preceded by Robert Peel	Baronet of Drayton Manor and Bury; 1850–1895	Succeeded by Robert Peel (born 1867)
