= William Johnson (Liberal-Labour politician) =

William Johnson MBE
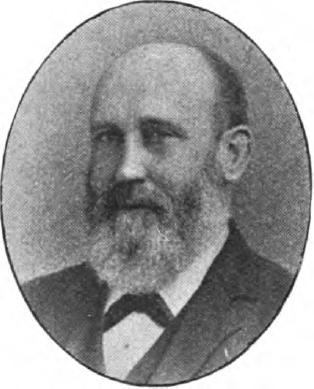
- Portrait, 1905

Member of Parliament for Nuneaton
- In office 1906–1918
- Preceded by: Francis Newdegate
- Succeeded by: Henry Maddocks
- Majority: 1,828 (13.6%)

Personal details
- Born: 1849 Chilvers Coton, Warwickshire
- Died: 20 July 1919 (aged 69–70)
- Party: Liberal-Labour
- Spouses: Priscilla Davenport (1868–1906; her death); Anne (1908)
- Occupation: Coal miner; trade unionist; politician

William Johnson MBE (c. 1849 – 20 July 1919) was an English coal miner, trade unionist and Liberal-Labour (Lib-Lab) politician from Warwickshire. He sat in the House of Commons from 1906 to 1918.

== Early life ==
Johnson was born in Chilvers Coton, which was then a small village near the town of Nuneaton in Warwickshire, the youngest son of John Johnson, a collier. He was educated at Collycroft School, and began work young, in both factories and collieries.

== Career ==
In 1885 Johnson became secretary to the Warwickshire Miners Association. After serving on several local bodies he was elected to Warwickshire County Council for Bedworth, becoming an alderman by 1916, by which times he was also chairman of Bedworth Parish Council, treasurer of the Midland Miners Federation, a Free and Accepted Mason of the Grand Lodge of England, a Justice of the Peace (J.P.) for Warwickshire, and a governor of the Nicholas Chamberlain School Foundation.

He first stood for election to Parliament at the 1892 general election, when he unsuccessfully contested the Tamworth division of Warwickshire as a Lib-Lab candidate, where he lost by a large margin of 31% of the votes to the Conservative Party MP Philip Muntz. He was unsuccessful again at the 1900 general election, when he contested the Nuneaton division, but by a narrower margin of 12.8%. He won the seat on his attempt, at the 1906 general election, and remained the Member of Parliament (MP) for Nuneaton until he retired from Parliament at the 1918 general election.

Although first elected as a Liberal party (Lib-Lab) MP, Johnson was required to take the Labour party whip in 1909. This was because of a decision by the Miners Federation of Great Britain, to affiliate to the Labour party. This decision was not popular with the Warwickshire Miners Association or Johnson's local Constituency Party, which refused to affiliate to the Labour party. In 1914, Labour Party HQ in London decided to set up a rival Constituency party in Nuneaton and Johnson continued to sit in parliament as a Liberal.

== Personal life ==
In 1868, Johnson married Priscilla Davenport, who died in 1906. He married again in 1908, to Anne, the widow of W. Copson of Leicester.

Parliament of the United Kingdom
Preceded by Francis Newdegate	Member of Parliament for Nuneaton; 1906 – 1918	Succeeded by Henry Maddocks
Trade union offices
Preceded by New position	Secretary of the Warwickshire Miners' Association; 1885 – 1917	Succeeded by William Johnson, Jr
Preceded by Benjamin Dean	Treasurer of the Midland Counties Miners' Federation c.1892 – 1919	Succeeded by William Johnson, Jr
