= Arthur Daniel =

English cricketer

Arthur William Trollope Daniel (3 January 1841 – 26 January 1873), was an English all-round sportsman and amateur cricketer who played from 1861 to 1869.

Daniel was born at St Pancras, London, the son of William Thomas Shave Daniel. A barrister at Lincoln's Inn, he had been captain of the Harrow Cricket XI and played for its Football XI while at school there. Going up to Trinity College, Cambridge, he was a founder member of the Cambridge University Athletic Club, running in the hurdles race for the university at its first Inter-Varsity sports match in 1864.

After leaving Cambridge, he was mainly associated with Middlesex, as a right-handed batsman and occasional wicket-keeper. He made 37 known appearances. He played for several predominantly amateur teams including the Gentlemen in the Gentlemen v Players series.

He died of tuberculosis at his brother-in-law's house on Victoria Road, Clapham on 26 January 1873, and was buried at West Norwood Cemetery. He is commemorated in one light of a stained glass window at St Mary the Virgin church, Great Wakering, Essex.
