= John Townshend, 5th Marquess Townshend =

British politician

The Most Honourable The Marquess Townshend DL
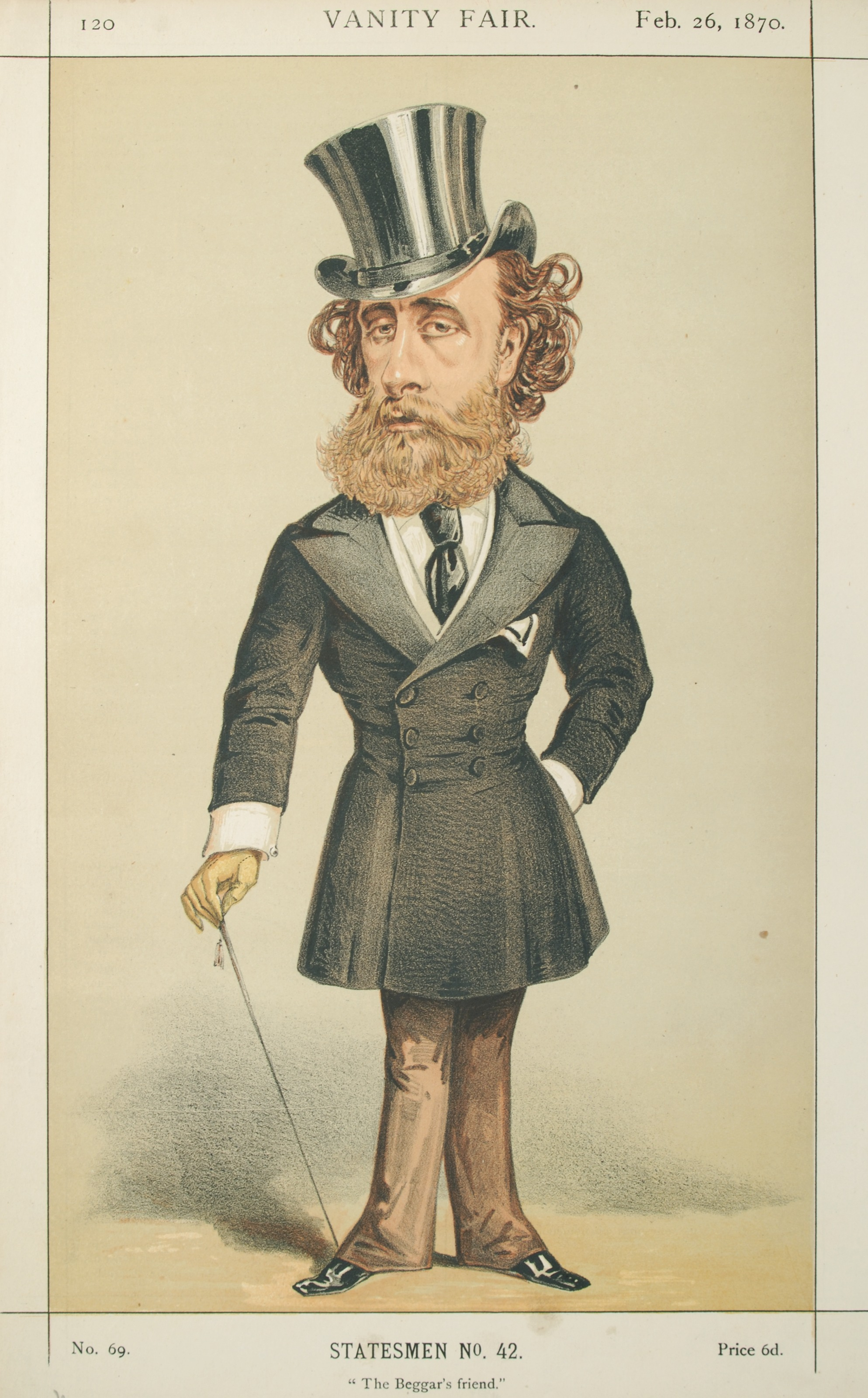
- Caricature by "Ἀτη" published in Vanity Fair in 1870.

Personal details
- Born: 10 April 1831
- Died: 26 October 1899 (aged 68)
- Party: Liberal; Universal League for the Material Elevation of the Industrious Classes
- Spouse: Lady Anne Duff (m. 1865)
- Children: John Townshend, 6th Marquess Townshend; Lady Agnes Cunningham-Durham
- Parent(s): John Townshend, 4th Marquess Townshend; Elizabeth Crichton-Stuart
- Occupation: Politician, peer

John Villiers Stuart Townshend, 5th Marquess Townshend DL (10 April 1831 – 26 October 1899), known as Viscount Raynham from 1855 to 1863, was a British peer and Liberal Member of Parliament.

== Life ==
Townshend was the son of John Townshend, 4th Marquess Townshend, and Elizabeth Jane Crichton-Stuart. The soldier George Townshend, 1st Marquess Townshend, was one of his paternal great-grandfathers, and Prime Minister John Stuart, 3rd Earl of Bute, was one of his maternal great-grandfathers. He was elected to the House of Commons for Tamworth in 1855 (succeeding his father), a seat he held until 1863, when he inherited the marquessate on his father's death and entered the House of Lords.

In 1869 Townshend introduced a bill to Parliament making it unlawful for anyone but a parent to box a child's ears, and to permit no corporeal punishment of children except for flogging, known to English youth as "horsing".

At the Salisbury Petty Sessions in May 1881, Lord Edward Thynne described how he had been accosted by Lord Townshend and two accomplices on the road between Laverstock and Salisbury. A Colonel Nepean held the pony's head while Townshend struck him several times with the handle of a horse whip. Thynne acknowledged having eloped with Lady Townshend in 1872, but noted that the marquess had never sued for divorce, and alleged that Lord Macduff had attacked him over the same matter while he was abroad.

Townshend was convicted of the assault, and sentenced to a fine of £500 or three months in prison. After some hours in jail, he reluctantly paid the fine, equivalent to £50,300 in 2023. Townshend denounced the court, while Vanity Fair reported unnamed others as saying "the only regret is that he [Thynne] was not thrashed earlier and worse".

In 1897 Lord Townsend placed Tamworth Castle and the neighbouring manors of Bolehall and Glascote up for auction. They were bought by the Corporation of Tamworth for £3,000 (equivalent to £322,600 in 2023). The corporation made the purchase in honour of Queen Victoria's Golden Jubilee. The castle had come the Townsend family through the marriage of Charlotte Compton, 16th Baroness Ferrers of Chartley to George Townshend, 1st Marquess Townshend in 1751, however the family had not lived at the castle and it had been rented to a series of tenants.

Lord Townshend died in October 1899, aged 68, and was succeeded in his titles by his son John.

== Family ==
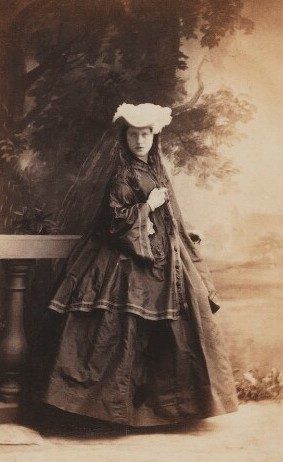
Lady Anne Elizabeth Clementina Duff, 1860 photograph

Lord Townshend married Lady Anne Elizabeth Clementina Duff, daughter of James Duff, 5th Earl Fife, on 17 October 1865. Their children included:

- John James Dudley Stuart Townshend, 6th Marquess Townshend (1866–1921)
- Lady Agnes Elizabeth Audrey Townshend (1870–1955), married James Cunningham-Durham and had issue

Lady Townshend died in 1925.

== Arms ==
Coat of arms of John Townshend, 5th Marquess Townshend
Crest A stag statant proper, attired and unguled or. Escutcheon Quarterly, 1st and 4th, Azure, a chevron ermine between three escallops argent (Townshend); 2nd and 3rd, quarterly gules and or, in the first quarter a mullet argent, in the centre a crescent sable (Vere). Supporters Dexter, A stag sable, attired and unguled or; Sinister, A greyhound argent. Motto Hæc generi incrementa fides (Faith obtained these honours for our race’). Other versions The arms are also shown without the Vere quarters.

Parliament of the United Kingdom
Preceded by John Townshend; Sir Robert Peel, Bt	Member of Parliament for Tamworth; 1856–1863; With: Sir Robert Peel, Bt	Succeeded by Sir Robert Peel, Bt; John Peel
Peerage of Great Britain
Preceded by John Townshend	Marquess Townshend; 1863–1899	Succeeded by John Townshend
