= John Townshend, 4th Marquess Townshend =

British nobleman, peer, politician, and naval commander

Rear-Admiral The Most Honourable The Marquess Townshend
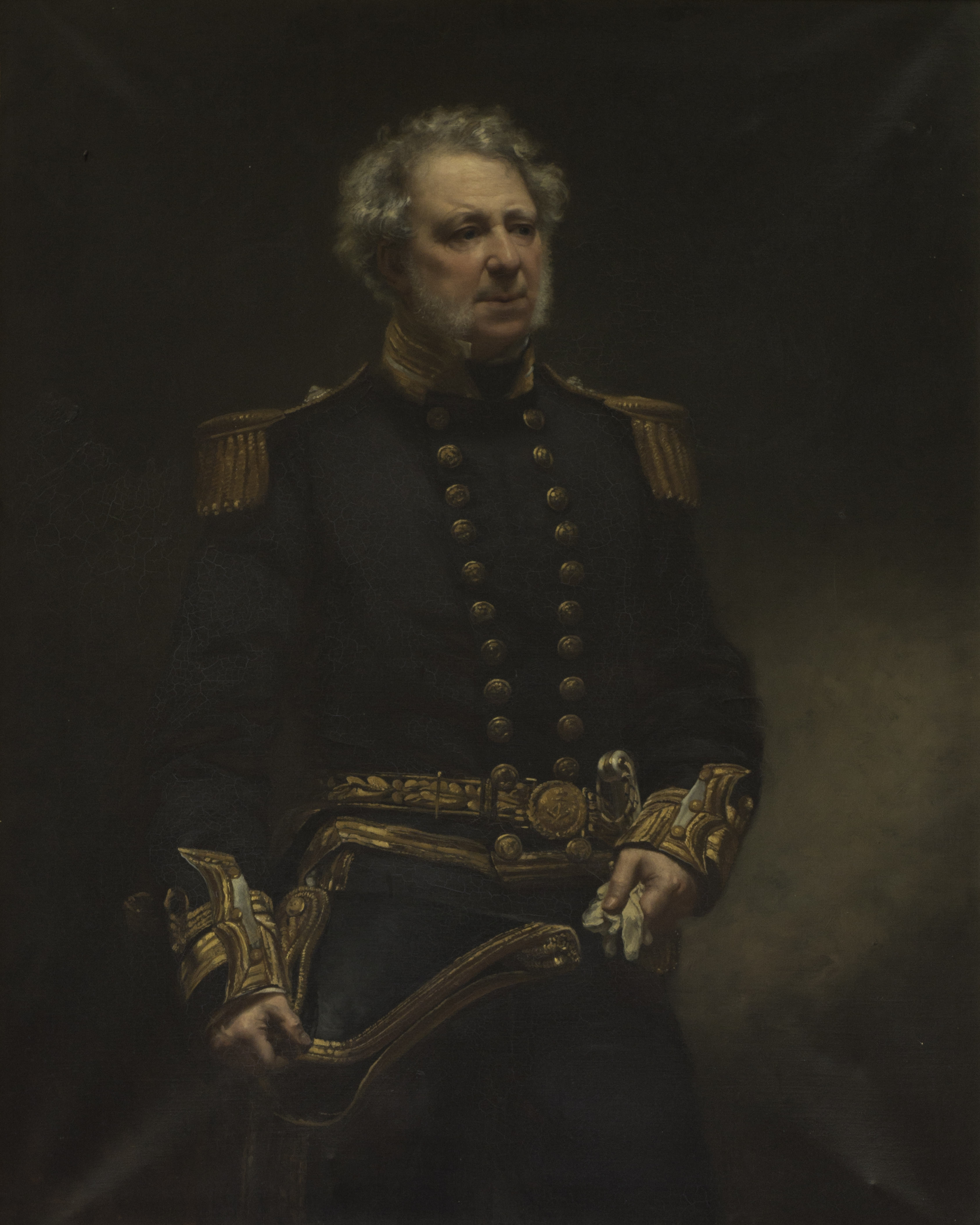
- portrait attributed to Henry William Pickersgill

Member of Parliament for Tamworth
- In office 1847–1855
- Preceded by: Sir Robert Peel, Bt, William Yates Peel
- Succeeded by: Sir Robert Peel, Bt, Viscount Raynham

Marquess Townshend
- In office 1855–1863
- Preceded by: George Townshend
- Succeeded by: John Townshend

Personal details
- Born: 28 March 1798
- Died: 10 September 1863 (aged 65)
- Occupation: British nobleman, politician, naval commander
- Known for: Member of Parliament, Rear-Admiral, 4th Marquess Townshend

Rear-Admiral John Townshend, 4th Marquess Townshend (28 March 1798 – 10 September 1863), known as John Townshend until 1855, was a British nobleman, peer, politician, and naval commander.

Townshend was the son of Lord John Townshend, younger son of George Townshend, 1st Marquess Townshend. His mother was Georgiana Anne Poyntz. His brother, Charles Fox Townshend, founded the Pop Society at Eton College. John Townshend served in the Royal Navy and achieved the rank of Rear-Admiral. Between 1847 and 1855 he also sat as a Member of Parliament (MP) for Tamworth. In the latter year he succeeded his first cousin in the marquessate and entered the House of Lords.

Lord Townshend married Elizabeth Jane Crichton-Stuart, daughter of Lord George Stuart, younger son of John Crichton-Stuart, 1st Marquess of Bute, on 18 August 1825. They had five children:

- Lady Audrey Jane Charlotte Townshend (d. 1926), married firstly, Greville Howard, son of Charles Howard, 17th Earl of Suffolk and had issue. She married secondly, General Redvers Henry Buller.
- James Dudley Browlow Stuart Townshend (d. 1846), unmarried
- Anne Maria Townshend (d. 1899), married Alexander Sherson
- Elizabeth Clementina Townshend (d. 1910), married John St Aubyn, 1st Baron St Levan and had issue
- John Villiers Stuart Townshend, 5th Marquess Townshend (1831–1899)

Lord Townshend died in September 1863, aged 65, as result of a fall from his horse in the grounds of his home, Raynham Hall, and was buried at East Raynham, Norfolk. He was succeeded in his titles by his eldest son John. Lady Townshend died in 1877.

== Arms ==
Coat of arms of John Townshend, 4th Marquess Townshend
Crest A stag statant proper, attired and unguled or. Escutcheon Quarterly, 1st and 4th, Azure, a chevron ermine between three escallops argent (Townshend); 2nd and 3rd, quarterly gules and or, in the first quarter a mullet argent, in the centre a crescent sable (Vere). Supporters Dexter, A stag sable, attired and unguled or; Sinister, A greyhound argent. Motto Hæc generi incrementa fides (Faith obtained these honours for our race’). Other versions The arms are also shown without the Vere quarters.

== See also ==
- O'Byrne, William Richard (1849). "Townshend, John" . A Naval Biographical Dictionary . John Murray – via Wikisource.

Parliament of the United Kingdom
Preceded by Sir Robert Peel, Bt; William Yates Peel	Member of Parliament for Tamworth; 1847 – 1855; With: Sir Robert Peel, 2nd Bt 1847–1850; Sir Robert Peel, 3rd Bt 1850–1855	Succeeded by Sir Robert Peel, Bt; Viscount Raynham
Peerage of Great Britain
Preceded by George Townshend	Marquess Townshend; 1855–1863	Succeeded by John Townshend
