= Percy Newson =

British banker and jute merchant in India

Sir Percy Newson Bt

Member of Parliament for Tamworth
- In office 1922–1923

Personal details
- Born: Percy Wilson Newson; 4 April 1874 Suffolk, England
- Died: 17 May 1950 (aged 76)
- Occupation: Banker and jute merchant

Sir Percy Wilson Newson, 1st Baronet (4 April 1874 – 17 May 1950) was a British banker and jute merchant in India.

Newson was born in Suffolk, the son of Georgina Martha and William Henry Newson. He was senior partner with Jardine, Skinner & Co in Calcutta and also became president of the Bank of Bengal in 1920 and Governor of the Imperial Bank of India in 1921. He was knighted in the 1920 New Year Honours and created a baronet in the 1921 Birthday Honours. He served as Conservative Member of Parliament for Tamworth from 1922 to 1923. He commissioned a pair of town houses by Wimperis, Simpson and Guthrie on the corner of Green Street and Dunraven Street, Mayfair, in 1924. He was the maternal grandfather of English explorer Ranulph Fiennes.

Parliament of the United Kingdom
| Preceded by Henry Wilson-Fox | Member of Parliament for Tamworth; 1922–1923 | Succeeded by Edward Iliffe |
Baronetage of the United Kingdom
| New creation | Baronet (of Framlingham); 1921–1950 | Extinct |
