= Ramsay-Steel-Maitland baronets =

Extinct baronetcy in the Baronetage of the United Kingdom

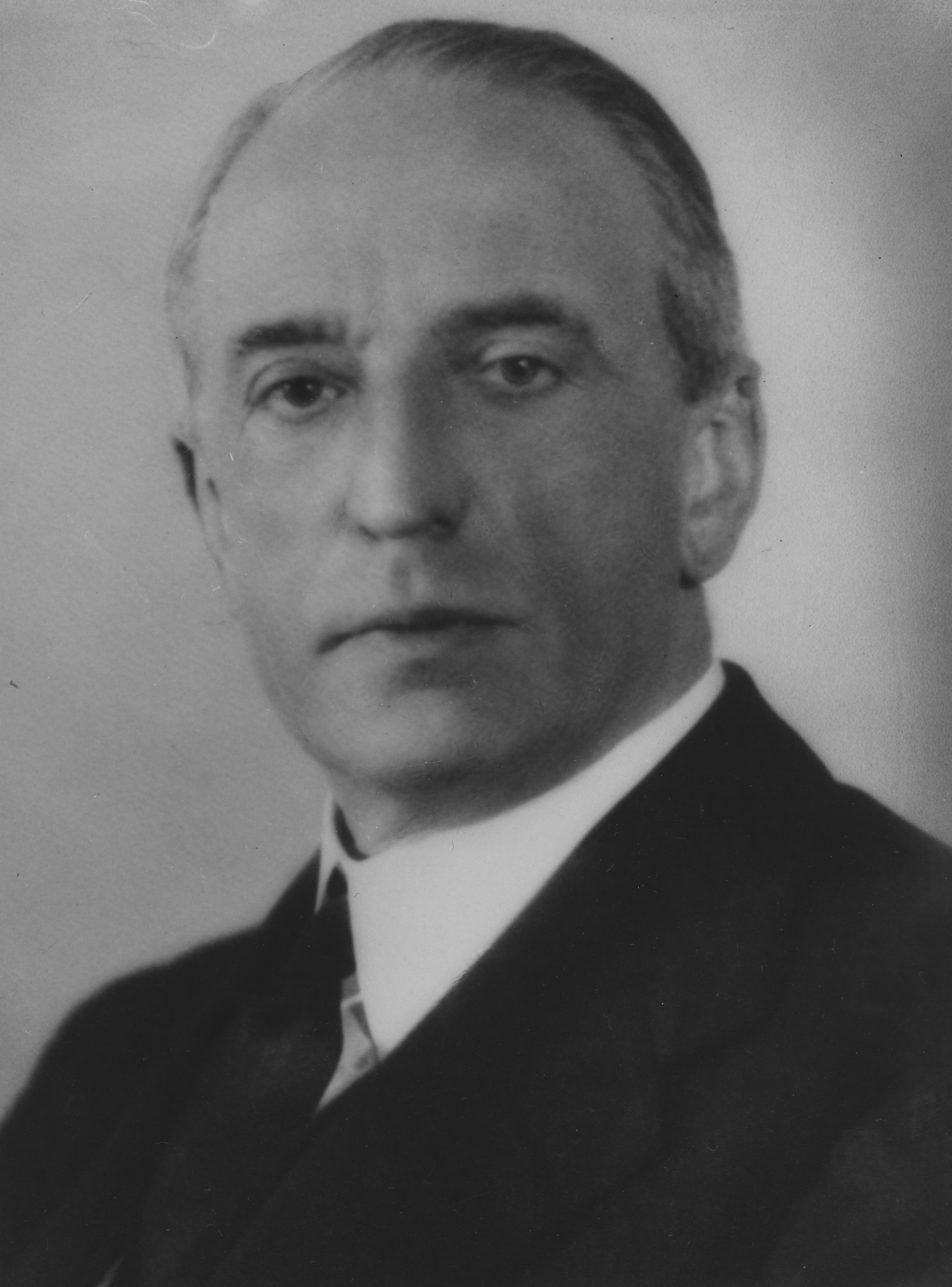
Sir Arthur Steel-Maitland, 1st Baronet

The Steel-Maitland, later Ramsay-Steel-Maitland Baronetcy, of Sauchie in the County of Stirling, was a title in the Baronetage of the United Kingdom. It was created on 30 March 1935 for the Conservative politician Arthur Steel-Maitland. The title was inherited successively by his two sons and became extinct on the death of the third Baronet in 1965.

== Steel-Maitland, later Ramsay-Steel-Maitland baronets, of Sauchie (1917) ==
- Sir Arthur Herbert Drummond Ramsay Steel-Maitland, 1st Baronet (1876–1935)
- Sir Arthur James Drummond Ramsay-Steel-Maitland, 2nd Baronet (1902–1960)
- Sir Keith Richard Felix Ramsay-Steel-Maitland, 3rd Baronet (1912–1965)

Coat of arms of Ramsay-Steel-Maitland of Sauchie
Crest A lion sejant affronted Gules, ducally crowned Or, holding in his dexter paw a sword Proper, hiked and pommelled of the Second, and in the sinister a fleur-de-lys Azure. Escutcheon Quarterly, 1st: Or, a lion rampant Gules, couped at all the joints of the First, within a double tressure flory-counterflory Azure (Maitland); 2nd: grand quarter counter-quartered, i and iv: Argent, three furisons Azure, (Steel); ii and iii: Or, three bars wavy Gules, the centre one charged with a crescent Argent, within a bordure Azure charged with three mullets of the first (Drummond); 3rd: Azure, an eagle displayed Sable within a bordure of the Last besanty Or, on a chief Gules two cinquefoils Ermine (Ramsay); 4th: grand quarter counter-quartered, i and iv: Azure, three keys fesseways in pale, wards downwards Or (Gibson); ii and iii, Azure, a chevron between three battle-axes Argent, within a bordure of the Last (Wright). Motto Consilio et animis

== See also ==
- Maitland baronets
