= Jabez Balfour =

British politician

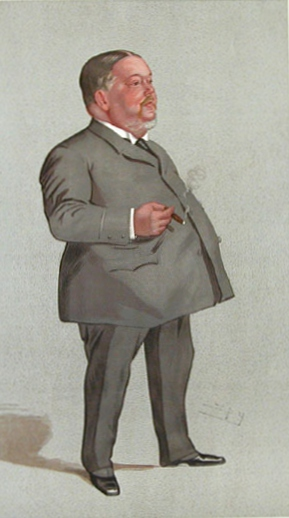
- Balfour as caricatured by "Spy" in Vanity Fair, March 1892

Member of Parliament for Burnley
- In office 1889-1893
- Preceded by: John Slagg
- Succeeded by: Philip Stanhope

Member of Parliament for Tamworth
- In office 1880-1885 Serving with Hamar Bass
- Preceded by: Sir Robert Peel, 3rd Baronet
- Succeeded by: Philip Albert Muntz

Personal details
- Born: Jabez Spencer Balfour; 4 September 1843 London, England
- Died: 23 February 1916 (aged 72)
- Party: Liberal
- Spouse: Ellen Mead (m. 1866)
- Children: 1

Jabez Spencer Balfour (4 September 1843 – 23 February 1916) was an English businessman, British Liberal Party politician and fraudster.

== Life ==
Balfour was born in Marylebone, London to James and Clara Lucas Balfour.

He was Member of Parliament for Tamworth from 1880 to 1885, and for Burnley from 1889 to 1893. Balfour was also interested in local politics in his home town of Croydon, Surrey, where he regularly topped the poll for the school board. When Croydon was awarded borough status in 1883 he was selected as charter mayor and re-elected for a second term. In 1885 he stood as Liberal candidate in Croydon at the general election but lost to the Conservatives. He also stood unsuccessfully for the Liberals at Walworth in 1886.

In 1880, he was appointed chairman of the Northampton Street Tramways.

Together with City financiers Leopold Salomons and Sir John Pender, Balfour founded the investment underwriting firm the Trustees, Executors and Securities Insurance Corporation Limited in December 1887.

In 1892, he was at the centre of a scandal over the failure of a series of companies which he had set up and controlled, starting with the London and General Bank and culminating in the Liberator Building Society, leaving thousands of investors penniless. Instead of advancing money to home buyers, the Liberator had advanced money to property companies to buy properties owned by Balfour, at a high price.

After the swindle was discovered, Balfour fled the country. He was arrested in Argentina by Inspector Frank Froest of Scotland Yard in 1895. With extradition proceedings held up by legal wrangling, Froest simply bundled Balfour into a train and then a boat sailing for England, The Tartar Prince. The captain of the ship, Thomas Hesketh, later received a letter from Balfour thanking him for his kindness and hospitality during the trip back to England. Balfour was tried at the Old Bailey and sentenced to 14 years penal servitude, most of which was served in harsh conditions in Portland prison. He was released in 1906.

After his release, his memoirs were serialised by Lord Northcliffe's Weekly Dispatch newspaper. Balfour died aged 72 on 23 February 1916, on a train from London to Wales, while heading for a job as a mining consultant.

He married Ellen Mead in 1866. By 1880, her mental condition had deteriorated and she became a patient in the Priory Hospital, Roehampton. They had a son, James, born in 1868, and four grandchildren.

== Legacy ==
Present day South Norwood, in the London Borough of Croydon, has a Balfour Road which is named after Jabez Balfour.

So does Ilford, Essex, where Balfour Road is on the former Ilford Lodge estate, bought for development by Balfour's group. In the same area Wellesley Road is named after his Croydon house and Morland Road after the road where Hobbs and Co, the builders, had their offices in Croydon. Also nearby is Granville Road: Granville was the middle name of the group's solicitor.

His name has, however, been erased from the memorial plaques at Croydon University Hospital (formerly Mayday Hospital).

Croydon Road and Tamworth Road in Arthur's Hill, Newcastle upon Tyne, were built using funds invested in the Liberator Building Society and named in tribute to Balfour.

Balfour plays a central role in the tabletop game Sherlock Holmes: Consulting Detective.

Parliament of the United Kingdom
Preceded by Sir Robert Peel and Hamar Bass	Member of Parliament for Tamworth; 1880 – 1885; With: Hamar Bass	Succeeded by Philip Albert Muntz
Preceded by John Slagg	Member of Parliament for Burnley; 1889 – 1893	Succeeded by Philip Stanhope
