= Henry Wilson-Fox =

English lawyer

Henry Wilson-Fox FRGS (18 August 1863 – 22 November 1921) was an English lawyer, journalist, tennis player, and businessman. He built his career in Rhodesia, where he became an associate of Cecil Rhodes, manager of the British South Africa Company, and an advocate of Rhodes's imperialist ideals.

In 1916 Wilson-Fox was a founder of the Empire Resources Development Committee, which promoted the idea of state-managed commercial development of the British Empire. He was elected in 1917 as the Conservative Member of Parliament (MP) for Tamworth. In the House of Commons, he focused on finance and imperial development until his death in 1921.

== Early life and family ==
The son of Wilson Fox, physician to Queen Victoria, he was educated at Charterhouse, Marlborough College, University College London and Trinity College, Cambridge. Wilson-Fox was an exhibitioner and scholar at Trinity, where he graduated with a BA in natural sciences. He represented Cambridge University at lawn tennis in 1885–86, and thereafter made tennis and golf his main recreations.

Wilson-Fox was called to the bar at Lincoln's Inn in 1888, having been an equity scholar.

In 1898 he married the Hon. Eleanor Birch Sclater-Booth, daughter of the 1st Baron Basing.

== Career ==
=== Africa ===
Wilson-Fox moved to Johannesburg in 1889, where he became editor of the South African Mining Journal in 1892. He worked with John Hays Hammond to help draft the Rhodesian mining laws, which brought him in contact with Cecil Rhodes, leading to his appointment in 1894 as public prosecutor in Rhodesia.

During the Second Matabele War in 1896, when the Ndebele rose up against white settlers and laid siege to Bulawayo, Cecil Rhodes led a relief column from Salisbury to Bulawayo, with Wilson-Fox as his transport and commissariat officer. In 1897, he undertook the same role during the Mashonaland rebellion. He was mentioned in despatches and received a medal with clasp.

Wilson-Fox returned to England for a holiday in May 1897, when he was offered the role of manager of the British South Africa Company (BSAC). The BSAC was a chartered company which administered Southern Rhodesia, North-Western Rhodesia and North-Eastern Rhodesia. Southern Rhodesia is now Zimbabwe, and the two northern zones were merged in 1911 to form Northern Rhodesia, which achieved independence in 1964 as Zambia. BSAC's role in the Jameson Raid and the Matabele Wars, along with its manipulation of share prices, made it the best-known charter company.

He took up the post the following year, aged 35. He dealt mostly with the commercial aspects of the company, and served on the boards of many of the biggest companies in Rhodesia. He joined the BSAC's board of directors in 1913, and was also a director of the Charter Trust and Agency, which had been spun off from the BSAC in 1902. By 1921 the Charter Trust owned over 3,690,000 acres (1,490,000 ha; 5,770 sq mi) acres in Rhodesia. Other directorships included the Mashonaland Railway Company, Rhodesia Railways, Trust and Agency Assets, the Wankie Colliery Company, and Willoughbys Consolidated Company.

He established a reputation as a good public speaker, and as a fervent supporter of the imperialistic ideals of Cecil Rhodes. He was a fellow of the Royal Colonial Institute, the Royal Statistical Society, and the Royal Geographical Society (RGS). In 1918 he became a vice-president of the RGS.

Wilson-Fox was also a periodic writer of letters to the editor of The Times newspaper. In 1912 he suggested that collisions between submarines could be avoided if "the example of the whale should be followed, and that by means of a small pump a spout of spray should be discharged into the air at regular intervals". In 1916 he proposed that domestic manufacturing industries—especially small and new ones—should be offered special protection by the state, in return for paying their workers a minimum wage and sharing profits with the state.

=== Empire development ===
In late September 1916, under the heading "Finance after the war", The Times published two articles by Wilson-Fox. The first article was "The need for new methods", in which he warned against attempts to pay off the war debt too quickly. He proposed that the state should instead cut taxation, and increase borrowing to invest in economic growth. In the second article "A board of development", he proposed the creation of a Board of Imperial Development which would invest in schemes anywhere in the British Empire which did not compete with existing commercial ventures and promised a return on investment of at least 10% per annum. The first of the two articles was accompanied by an editorial in which The Times supported the broad outline of his proposals.

The articles were reprinted and widely circulated, leading to an inaugural meeting on 31 October 1916 of a body which became the Empire Resources Development Committee (ERDC). The principal founders were Wilson-Fox, the Conservative MP Alfred Bigland (an early supporter of the Tariff Reform League), and Moreton Frewen. Frewen was a former cattle-rancher in Wyoming and a vice-president of the Imperial Federation League.

The committee was publicly launched after a meeting in early 1917 at the London offices of the Rhodes Trust under the chairmanship of Lord Milner. Dedicated to pursuing the aims set out by Wilson-Fox, the ERC was chaired by Sir Starr Jameson, with Wilson-Fox as honorary secretary and Almeric Paget as honorary treasurer.

The committee's manifesto was published on 29 January 1917, claiming to represent "every party in the state". The ERDC claimed that if their plans were adopted, the national debt would not be a problem after the war.

The 33 signatories to the manifesto included MPs and former MPs, government ministers, writers, journalists, and businessmen (4 of whom were involved with the BSAC). The full list was: Waldorf Astor, Alfred Bigland, Henry Birchenough, Harry Brittain, Wiliam Bull, Henry Page Croft, Henry Cust, Lord Desborough, the Earl of Dunraven, Sir Laming Worthington-Evans, Algernon Firth, Victor Fisher, Moreton Frewen, the Earl Grey, Rupert Gwynne, John Hodge, Lord Islington, Sir Starr Jameson, Rudyard Kipling, Arthur Lawley W. H. Lynch, Halford Mackinder, Ian Macpherson, V. A. Malcolmson, George Croydon Marks, Walter Grant Morden, Horace Plunkett, the Earl of Plymouth, J. A. Seddon, the Earl of Selborne, Richard Vassar-Smith, and Henry Wilson-Fox.

Later that year, Harry Brittain wrote "We hold that the scientific development of the resources of the empire, especially perhaps of the tropical empire, offers the only possible way of avoiding a permanent taxation much at the present level". In a paper delivered in 1918 to the Royal Colonial Institute on behalf of the committee, Wilson-Fox set out their vision more poetically:

Looking into the future, we can visualise the State as an owner of vast herds of cattle Overseas raised on lands which are today unutilized; as a proprietor of forests and valuable plantations of tropical shrubs and trees grown on areas which are still virgin; as the harnesser of mighty waterfalls fed by the eternal snows of India and Africa; as an organiser of great commercial air services; and as the reaper on an immense scale of the manifold harvest of the seas.

— Henry Fox-Wilson, Esq., MP, "Payment of War Debt by Development of Empire Resources". United Empire: The Royal Colonial Institute Journal. 1918. p. 175.

His other writings epitomised the committee's values. Fox-Wilson sought restriction on foreign land-holdings and business activity in Britain. He opposed laissez-faire in industry, supported productivity agreements to replace wage-bargaining, and sought an economy devoted to building national resources rather than satisfying consumer demand.

The ERDC's approach was criticised by John X. Merriman, the last Prime Minister of the Cape Colony. Merriman derided Wilson-Fox's proposals as "ridiculous", and claimed that they amounted to "The British Empire being managed ... I suppose like the Chartered Company". In England, the Manchester Guardian and the Aborigines Protection Society' attacked the proposed creation of state monopolies, and the usurpation of the land rights of Africans who would become labourers rather than farmers.

=== Parliament ===
In February 1917, Francis Newdegate MP was appointed as Governor of Tasmania. This created a vacancy for Newdegate's parliamentary seat of Tamworth in Staffordshire, and on 13 February Wilson-Fox was adopted as the Unionist (Conservative) candidate for the resulting by-election.

The Liberal Party did not nominate a candidate, keeping the war-time electoral truce. (The Labour, Liberal and Conservative parties had agreed not to contest any vacancies which arose in seats held by their opponents.) When nominations closed on 23 February, Wilson-Fox was the only candidate nominated, and so was declared elected without a vote. He was returned unopposed at the general election in December 1918.

In Parliament he continue to promote the cause of trade and investment within the British Empire. The EDRC's work led to the formation of an Empire Development Parliamentary Committee, of which Fox-Wilson became the vice-chair. By 1921, it had over 200 members.

In July 1917, he moved an amendment to the Finance Bill which would have given a reduction in the income tax paid on the returns from investments made within the Empire. Later that month he was appointed to the Commons select committee on finance.

In February 1921, he came fourth in the annual ballot for Private Members' Bills. He announced that he intended to present a bill to amend the provisions of the Trade Union Act 1913 in respect of political levies.

In October 1921, Wilson-Fox was part of a delegation of MPs from the Empire Development Parliamentary Committee, who met with Winston Churchill, the Secretary of State for the Colonies. Led by Alfred Bigland, they pressed the case for more rapid development of the Empire "to find openings for our millions of surplus population". The MPs sought a "gradual transfer to the overseas dominions" of these surplus people, and Churchill expressed support for their ideas.

== Death ==
On 19 November 1921, The Times reported that Wilson was "seriously ill, and his condition gives cause for anxiety". Daily bulletins followed. On Monday 21 November, it reported that "his condition yesterday showed improvement"; but Tuesday's report was "no improvement".

The following day, The Times announced his death in London, aged 58. Wilson-Fox was buried on 25 November at Brookwood Cemetery in Surrey, after a funeral conducted by his brothers-in-law Canon Merewether and Canon Baggallay. A memorial service was held on 28 November at St Margaret's, Westminster, the parish church of the House of Commons. The by-election for his seat in the Commons was held on 17 January 1922, and won by the Conservative candidate Sir Percy Newson, Bt.

His estate was valued at £63,020 (equivalent to £3.1 million in 2025), with net personalty of £41,678 (equivalent to £2.05 million in 2025).

His wife Eleanor survived him by more than 40 years, dying aged 92 in October 1963. She had been made a Commander of the Order of the British Empire (CBE) in 1918 for her work as Chairman of the South African Comforts Committee in London.

Henry and Eleanor Wilson-Fox had two children. Their son George Hubert Wilson-Fox was born 1899, and married in 1935. Their daughter Leila Eleanor Wilson-Fox was born in 1901, and died at Aldeburgh-on-Sea in 1903.

Parliament of the United Kingdom
Preceded by Sir Francis Newdegate	Member of Parliament for Tamworth; 1917 – 1921	Succeeded by Sir Percy Newson, Bt
