= Arthur Steel-Maitland =

British politician

The Right Honourable Sir Arthur Steel-Maitland Bt
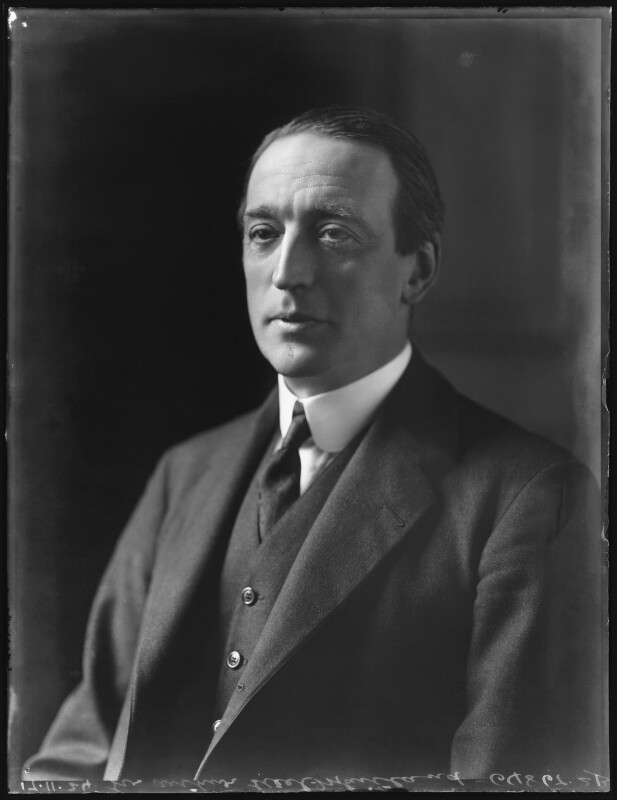

Chairman of the Conservative Party
- In office 1911–1916
- Monarch: George V
- Prime Minister: H.H. Asquith; David Lloyd George
- Preceded by: Position established
- Succeeded by: George Younger

Minister for Labour
- In office 6 November 1924 – 4 June 1929
- Monarch: George V
- Prime Minister: Stanley Baldwin
- Preceded by: Tom Shaw
- Succeeded by: Margaret Bondfield

Personal details
- Born: 5 July 1876
- Died: 30 March 1935 (aged 58)
- Party: Conservative
- Spouse: Mary Maitland
- Education: Balliol College, Oxford

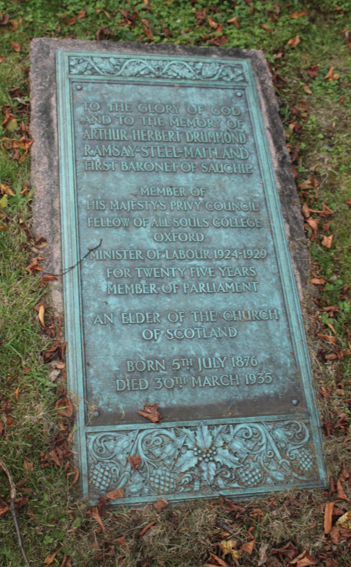
The grave of Sir Arthur Steel-Maitland, St Ninian's Churchyard, Stirling

Sir Arthur Herbert Drummond Ramsay Steel-Maitland, 1st Baronet (5 July 1876 – 30 March 1935) was a British Conservative politician. He was the first Chairman of the Conservative Party from 1911 to 1916 and held junior office from 1915 to 1919 in David Lloyd George's coalition government. From 1924 to 1929 he was Minister of Labour under Stanley Baldwin, with a seat in the cabinet.

== Background and education ==
The second son of Mary Emmeline Eden Drummond, daughter of General Henry Drummond, and Colonel Edward Harris Steel, Steel-Maitland was educated at Rugby and at Balliol College, Oxford, where he was a classical Scholar and Eldon Scholar in 1899. He gained first class honours in classics and law, and became a Fellow of All Souls College in 1900 (receiving an MA from the college in January 1903). He was Secretary, Junior Treasurer and President of the Oxford Union Society, and rowed against Cambridge in 1899.

== Political career ==
Steel-Maitland was appointed an assistant private secretary (unpaid) to the Chancellor of the Exchequer, Charles Ritchie, in October 1902. He unsuccessfully contested Rugby in 1906, and was a Special Commissioner to the Royal Commission on the Poor Laws from 1906 to 1907. He was elected as Member of Parliament for Birmingham East in 1910, a seat he held until 1918, and then represented Birmingham Erdington from 1918 to 1929 and Tamworth from 1929 until 1935. He was the first Chairman of the Conservative Party from 1911 to 1916, and founded the Unionist Social Reform Committee in 1911.

Steel-Maitland served under David Lloyd George as Under-Secretary of State for the Colonies from 1915 to 1917. The latter year he was created a Baronet, of Sauchie in the County of Stirling. He then held office under Lloyd George as Secretary for Overseas Trade in his capacity as Head of the Department of Overseas Trade (Development and Intelligence) from 1917 to 1919. In 1924 he was sworn of the Privy Council and appointed Minister of Labour under Stanley Baldwin, with a seat in the cabinet, a post he retained until the government fell in June 1929.

== Other ==
Steel-Maitland was awarded honorary degrees of LL.D. by the University of Edinburgh and the University of St Andrews.

== Legacy ==
A new residential area of Erdington, Birmingham had a road named after Arthur Steel-Maitland in December 2016.

== Family ==
His brother, Col. Richard Steel, was concerned with MIO during the war.

Steel-Maitland married Mary, daughter of Sir James Ramsay-Gibson-Maitland, 4th Baronet, of Barnton and Sauchie, in 1901. He died in March 1935, aged 58, while playing golf at Rye. He had just played a magnificent shot when he fell. His death was recorded as due to chronic heart trouble. He was succeeded in the baronetcy by his son, Arthur.

Parliament of the United Kingdom
Preceded by Sir John Benjamin Stone	Member of Parliament for Birmingham East; January 1910–1918	Constituency abolished
New constituency	Member of Parliament for Birmingham Erdington; 1918–1929	Succeeded by Charles Simmons
Preceded by Sir Edward Iliffe	Member of Parliament for Tamworth; 1929–1935	Succeeded by Sir John Mellor, Bt
Political offices
Preceded by The Lord Islington	Under-Secretary of State for the Colonies; 1915–1917	Succeeded by William Hewins
New title	Secretary for Overseas Trade; 1917–1919	Succeeded by Sir Hamar Greenwood, Bt
Preceded by Tom Shaw	Minister of Labour; 1924–1929	Succeeded by Margaret Bondfield
Party political offices
New title	Chairman of the Conservative Party; 1911–1916	Succeeded by Sir George Younger, Bt
Baronetage of the United Kingdom
New creation	Baronet (of Sauchie); 1917–1935	Succeeded by Arthur Ramsay-Steel-Maitland
