= Francis Newdegate =

British politician and colonial administrator (1862–1936)

Sir Francis Newdegate GCMG GCStJ
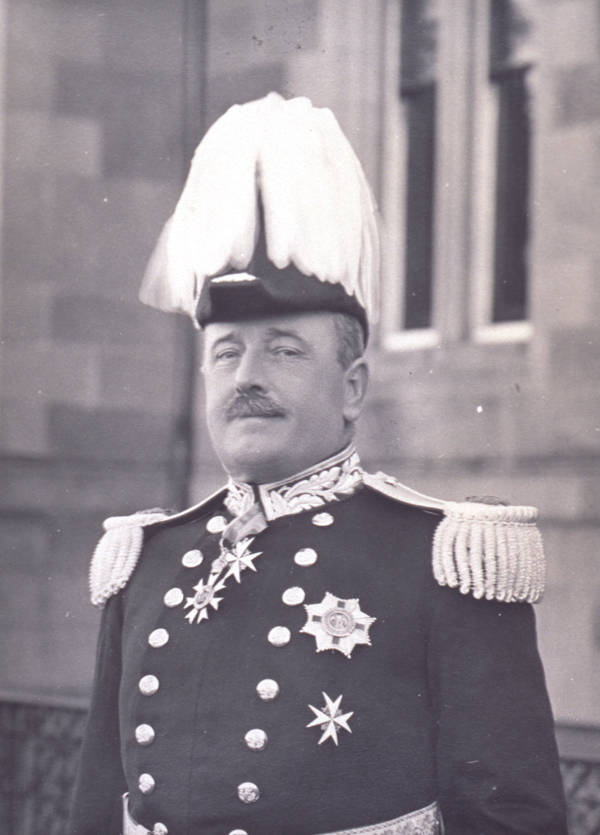

Member of Parliament for Nuneaton
- In office 1892–1906
- Preceded by: John Dugdale
- Succeeded by: William Johnson

Member of Parliament for Tamworth
- In office 1909–1917
- Preceded by: Sir Philip Muntz
- Succeeded by: Henry Wilson-Fox

12th Governor of Tasmania
- In office 30 March 1917 – 9 February 1920
- Monarch: George V
- Premier: Walter Lee
- Preceded by: Sir William Ellison-Macartney
- Succeeded by: Sir William Lamond Allardyce

18th Governor of Western Australia
- In office 9 April 1920 – 16 June 1924
- Monarch: George V
- Premier: James Mitchell; Philip Collier
- Preceded by: Sir William Ellison-Macartney
- Succeeded by: Sir William Campion

Personal details
- Born: 31 December 1862 Chelsea, London, England
- Died: 2 January 1936 (aged 73) Nuneaton, Warwickshire, England
- Party: Conservative
- Spouse: Hon. Elizabeth Sophia Lucia Bagot

Sir Francis Alexander Newdigate Newdegate, GCMG GCStJ (31 December 1862 – 2 January 1936) was an English Conservative Party politician. After over twenty years in the House of Commons, he served as Governor of Tasmania from 1917 to 1920, and Governor of Western Australia from 1920 to 1924.

== Early life and family ==
Born in 1862, he was the son of Lieutenant Colonel Francis William Newdigate and his first wife Charlotte Elizabeth Agnes Sophia Woodford, and grandson of Francis Parker Newdigate. He was educated at Eton and the Royal Military College, Sandhurst, and was commissioned into the Grenadier Guards in 1883. He married Elizabeth Sophia Lucia Bagot on 13 October 1888.

Newdegate inherited estates at Arbury Hall, near Nuneaton and at Harefield, near Uxbridge, on the death of his father in 1893, and uncle Sir Edward Newdegate in 1902. He assumed the additional surname "Newdegate", differently spelt, under the terms of the will of a kinsman Charles Newdigate Newdegate, in September 1902. In 1911 he erected, at Arbury Hall, a monument to the memory of George Eliot, whose father had been employed on the Arbury estate.

== Career ==
Newdegate was Member of Parliament for Nuneaton from 1892 to 1906, and for Tamworth from 1909 to 1917. He was on 14 February 1917 appointed Steward of the Manor of Northstead, a mechanism for resigning from the House of Commons, on his appointment as Governor of Tasmania.

Newdegate was appointed a Knight Commander of the Order of St Michael and St George in 1917 upon his appointment as Governor of Tasmania (1917 to 1920). He was appointed Governor of Western Australia in 1920 where he served until 1924. On retirement he was promoted to Knight Grand Cross of the Order of St Michael and St George in 1925. The Western Australian town of Newdegate is named after him.

== Later life and death ==
Newdegate was appointed High Steward of the Royal Town of Sutton Coldfield in 1925. On his death in 1936 his estates passed to his daughter Lucia, who in 1919, had married John Maurice Fitzroy, father of the 3rd Viscount Daventry.

== Personal life ==
He was a friend of Sir Alexander Russell Downer, who built a large home and gardens in the Adelaide Hills in South Australia and named it Arbury Park after the Newdigate family home.

== See also ==
- Newdigate family

Parliament of the United Kingdom
Preceded by John Dugdale	Member of Parliament for Nuneaton; 1892–1906	Succeeded by William Johnson
Preceded by Sir Philip Muntz	Member of Parliament for Tamworth; 1909–1917	Succeeded by Henry Wilson-Fox
Government offices
Preceded by Sir William Ellison-Macartney	Governor of Tasmania; 1917–1920	Succeeded by Sir William Lamond Allardyce
Preceded by Sir William Ellison-Macartney	Governor of Western Australia; 1920–1924	Succeeded by Sir William Campion
