= John Peel (Tamworth MP) =

John Peel (4 February 1804 – 2 April 1872) was an English Liberal Party politician.

Peel was the son of Thomas Peel of Peelfold. He was educated at Manchester Grammar School, and became a merchant.

Peel was elected as a member of parliament (MP) for Tamworth at a by-election in October 1863, following the succession to the peerage of the Liberal MP Viscount Raynham. He was re-elected in 1865, but was defeated at the 1868 general election by Henry Bulwer.

When Bulwer was elevated to the peerage in 1871, Peel was elected unopposed in his place, and held the seat until his own death in April 1872, aged 68.

Peel was also a justice of the peace for Warwickshire and Staffordshire.

Parliament of the United Kingdom
Preceded by Sir Robert Peel, Bt; Viscount Raynham	Member of Parliament for Tamworth; 1863 – 1868; With: Sir Robert Peel, Bt	Succeeded by Sir Robert Peel, Bt; Sir Henry Bulwer
Preceded by Sir Robert Peel, Bt; Sir Henry Bulwer	Member of Parliament for Tamworth; 1871 – 1872; With: Sir Robert Peel, Bt	Succeeded by Sir Robert Peel, Bt; Robert William Hanbury
