= William Thomas Shave Daniel =

English barrister and judge

William Thomas Shave Daniel, QC (1806–1891) was vice-chairman of the Incorporated Council of Law Reporting.

== Life ==
He was the eldest son of William Daniel, of Stapenhill, then part of Derbyshire. W T S Daniel was born on 17 March 1806. He was educated at Repton School. On 12 September 1831, he married Harriet, eldest daughter of John Mayou, Esq., of Coleshill. She died in 1838. On 11 April 1840, he married Sarah, only daughter of Arthur William Trollope, headmaster of Christ's Hospital. W T S Daniel was the father of Arthur William Trollope Daniel.

== Career ==
W T S Daniel became a student of Lincoln's Inn on 27 January 1825, was called to the bar on 8 February 1830, became Queen's Counsel on 17 July 1851, and was called to the bench on 3 November 1851. He was recorder of Ipswich from May 1842 to November 1848. He was a county court judge on circuit No. 11 from March 1867 to 12 April 1884. He was a joint judge at Leeds for the trial of equity and bankruptcy cases in 1875. He was vice-chairman (and originator) of the system of the law reports of the Council of Law Reporting from 1865 to 1870 and a member of the Law Digest Commission in 1868. He contested Tamworth in 1859 and 1865.

== Death ==
He died at 51 The Parade, Leamington on 9 June 1891.

== Works ==
He is the author of The History and Origin of the Law Reports (1884). The Saturday Review said that W T S Daniel was the authority on law reporting.
