= 1929 Tamworth by-election =

UK Parliamentary by-election

The 1929 Tamworth by-election was held on 2 December 1929. The by-election was held due to the resignation of the incumbent Conservative MP, Sir Edward Iliffe. It was won by the Conservative candidate Arthur Steel-Maitland.

== Background ==
Sir Edward Iliffe had been MP for Tamworth since 1923. In the general elections of both 1923 and 1924 Iliffe had been returned unopposed. In the general election a few months earlier he had been challenged by Labour candidate George Horwill, but had been easily re-elected, with Horwill polling only 14,402 votes against Iliffe's total of 29,807.

Horwill, an ex-railway clerk who held a BSc degree from the University of London, was again the Labour candidate in the by-election. The new Conservative candidate was Arthur Steel-Maitland, a former cabinet minister who had been a member of parliament from 1910, but who had lost narrowly lost his Birmingham Erdington seat at the recent general election.

== Result ==
The Unionist Party held the seat comfortably.

Tamworth by-election, 2 December 1929
Party	Candidate	Votes	%	±%
Unionist	Arthur Steel-Maitland	23,495	64.8	−2.6
Labour	George Horwill	12,759	35.2	+2.6
Majority		10,736	29.6	−5.2
Turnout		36,254	60.3	−13.3
Registered electors		60,087		
Unionist hold		Swing	−2.6	

== Aftermath ==
At the next election Steel-Maitland substantially increased his majority to over 34,000 votes.
