= 1871 Tamworth by-election =

UK Parliamentary by-election

The 1871 Tamworth by-election was fought on 28 March 1871. The by-election was fought due to the elevation to the peerage of the incumbent MP of the Liberal Party, Henry Bulwer. It was won by the Liberal candidate John Peel.
