= 1909 Tamworth by-election =

UK Parliamentary by-election

The 1909 Tamworth by-election was held on 16 January 1909. The by-election was held due to the death of the incumbent Conservative MP, Sir Philip Muntz. It was won by the Conservative candidate Francis Newdegate, who was unopposed.
