= 1878 Tamworth by-election =

UK Parliamentary by-election

The 1878 Tamworth by-election was fought on 24 April 1878. The by-election was fought due to the resignation of the incumbent, Conservative MP, Robert William Hanbury, in order to contest North Staffordshire. It was won by the Liberal candidate Hamar Bass.

1878 Tamworth by-election (1 seat)
Party	Candidate	Votes	%	±%
Liberal	Hamar Bass	1,186	66.1	+20.2
Conservative	Francis Bridgeman	607	33.9	−4.4
Majority		579	32.2	N/A
Turnout		1,793	85.5	+9.0
Registered electors		2,096		
Liberal gain from Conservative		Swing	+12.3	
