= 1872 Tamworth by-election =

UK Parliamentary by-election

The 1872 Tamworth by-election was fought on 16 April 1872. The by-election was fought due to the death of the incumbent Liberal MP, John Peel. It was won by the Conservative candidate Robert William Hanbury.
