= 1922 Tamworth by-election =

UK Parliamentary by-election

The 1922 Tamworth by-election was held on 17 January 1922. The by-election was held due to the death of the incumbent Coalition Conservative MP, Henry Wilson-Fox. It was won by the Coalition Conservative candidate Percy Newson.

== Result ==
Tamworth by-election, 1922
Party		Candidate	Votes	%	±%
C	Unionist	Percy Newson	14,732	68.8	N/A
	Labour	George Henry Jones	6,671	31.2	New
Majority			8,061	17.6	N/A
Turnout			21,403	60.0	N/A
	Unionist hold		Swing	N/A	
C indicates candidate endorsed by the coalition government.
