= 1935 Tamworth by-election =

UK Parliamentary by-election

The 1935 Tamworth by-election was held on 10 May 1935. The by-election was held due to the death of the incumbent Conservative MP, Sir Arthur Ramsay-Steel-Maitland. It was won by the Conservative candidate John Mellor.
