= Philip Muntz =

British politician

Coat of arms of Philip Muntz

Crest
In front of a demi-swan wings expanded Argent semee of trefoils slipped Vert a staff raguly fesswise Or.
Escutcheon
Pean on a mount in base Proper a swan rising Argent charged on each wing with a trefoil slipped Vert in chief a staff raguly erect between two estoiles Or.
Motto
Basis Virtutum Constantia (Steadiness Is The Foundation of the Virtues)

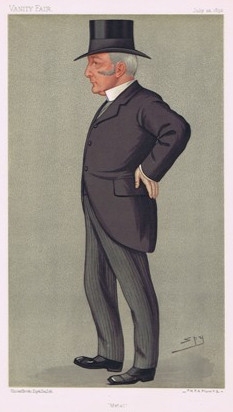
"Metal" Muntz as caricatured by Spy (Leslie Ward) in Vanity Fair, July 1892

Sir Philip Albert Muntz, 1st Baronet (5 January 1839 – 21 December 1908) was an English businessman and politician who sat in the House of Commons from 1884 to 1906.

Muntz was the son of George Frederic Muntz of Umberslade Hall, Warwickshire and his wife Eliza Price. He was a J.P. for Warwickshire. In 1881 he built Dunsmore House, a three-storey Grade II listed country house near Rugby.

In 1884, Muntz was elected as a Conservative Member of Parliament (MP) for Warwickshire North but the constituency was abolished under the Redistribution of Seats Act 1885. He was elected as MP for Tamworth at the 1885 general election, and held the seat until his death in 1908 aged 69.

It was announced that he would receive a baronetcy in the 1902 Coronation Honours list published on 26 June 1902 for the (subsequently postponed) coronation of King Edward VII, and on 24 July 1902 he was created a Baronet, of Dunmore, near Rugby, in the parish of Clifton-on-Dunmore, in the county of Warwick.

Muntz married his cousin Rosalie Muntz, daughter of Philip Henry Muntz in 1859.

Parliament of the United Kingdom
Preceded by William Bromley-Davenport; Charles Newdigate Newdegate	Member of Parliament for North Warwickshire; 1884 – 1885; With: Charles Newdigate Newdegate	Constituency abolished
Preceded by Hamar Bass; Jabez Spencer Balfour	Member of Parliament for Tamworth; 1885 – 1908	Succeeded by Francis Newdegate
Baronetage of the United Kingdom
New creation	Baronet (of Clifton-upon-Dunsmore); 1902–1908	Succeeded by Gerard Albert Muntz
