= 1917 Tamworth by-election =

UK Parliamentary by-election

The 1917 Tamworth by-election was held on 23 February 1917. The by-election was held due to the incumbent Conservative MP, Francis Newdegate, becoming Governor of Tasmania. It was won by the Conservative candidate Henry Wilson-Fox who was unopposed due to a War-time electoral pact.
