= Unionist Social Reform Committee =

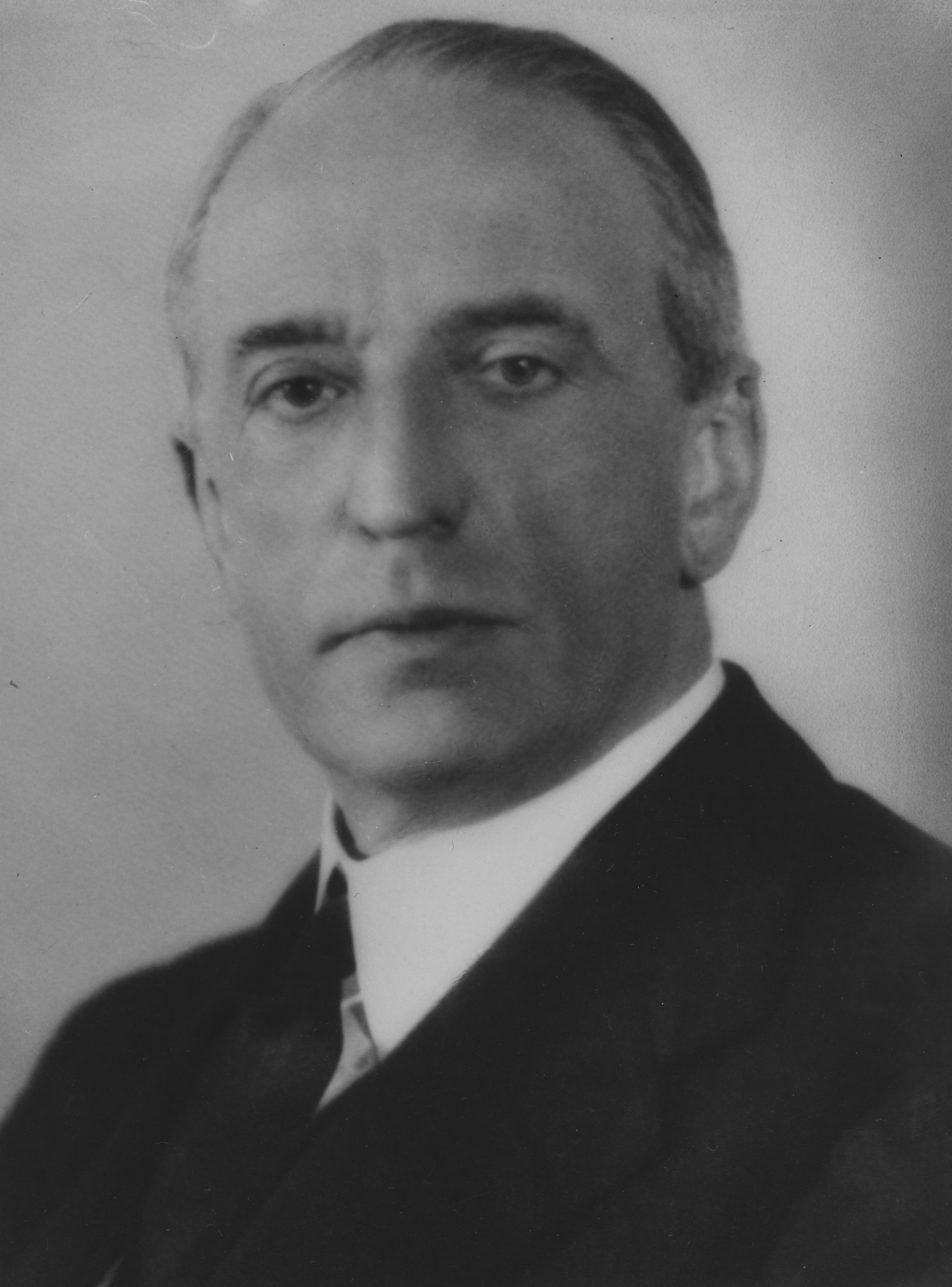
Arthur Steel-Maitland

The Unionist Social Reform Committee was a group within the British Conservative Party dedicated to help formulating a Conservative policy of social reform between 1911 and 1914. According to E. H. H. Green, the Committee "saw the earliest, detailed discussion of Conservative principles concerning the role of the State in the provision of social welfare".

== History ==
Arthur Steel-Maitland was elected to parliament as a Conservative in January 1910 and in October he sought to bring together Conservative social reformers into a committee. However, this was postponed by the general election of December. The Committee held its first meeting in February 1911. Green stated that Steel-Maitland was "very much the driving force behind the USRC, which under his aegis had become an official party think-tank of Conservative politicians and intellectuals dedicated to formulating Conservative social policy".

In September 1913 the Committee called for rural wage boards, appointed by County Councils and would, if necessary, enforce a minimum wage. This divided the party and party leader Bonar Law attempted to postpone a decision by telling the party conference in November that an inquiry would be set up looking at the proposals. Infighting continued, however, with Lord Salisbury emerging as one of the foremost opponents of regulating rural wages. He wrote to Steel-Maitland, claiming that a minimum wage should be enforced locally not nationally and should be voluntary, claiming that it would cause unemployment. Steel-Maitland in reply argued that as demand for rural labour exceeded supply, there was no danger of unemployment and that a voluntary minimum wage would not bring underpaying farmers into line.

In the Committee's 1914 book, Industrial Unrest, they argued:

We have in this country now outlived that curious philosophic conception of the relations between the State and the individual which finds its origins in Rousseau and its most powerful exponents on this side of the channel in Bentham, the two Mills, Herbert Spencer and Cobden...[and that] the old Cobdenite and laissez faire view that the conditions of wages, health, housing and labour among the vast majority of the population of this country was the concern of private individuals and private contract has long since been abandoned.

At the outbreak of war in 1914, the Committee was in the middle of an in-depth study on the provision of health care. In an undated paper titled ‘The Theory of Public Health’, the Committee noted that "The boundary between private and the official sphere is constantly changing and sometimes eludes precise definition...[it is] true that the voluntary association of individuals here and there intercepts the necessity for public action...that does not affect the general proposition that the care and improvement of its subjects' health must occupy a large place in the outlook of every modern and civilised government".

== Publications ==
- Poor Law Reform. A Practical Programme (1913)
- Industrial Unrest (1914)
