= Peelite =

British political faction

Peelites
- Leader: Robert Peel; Lord Aberdeen
- Founder: Robert Peel
- Founded: 1846; 180 years ago
- Dissolved: 1859; 167 years ago
- Split from: Conservative Party
- Merged into: Liberal Party
- Ideology: Free trade Liberal conservatism
- Political position: Centre to centre-right
- Colours: Blue Green

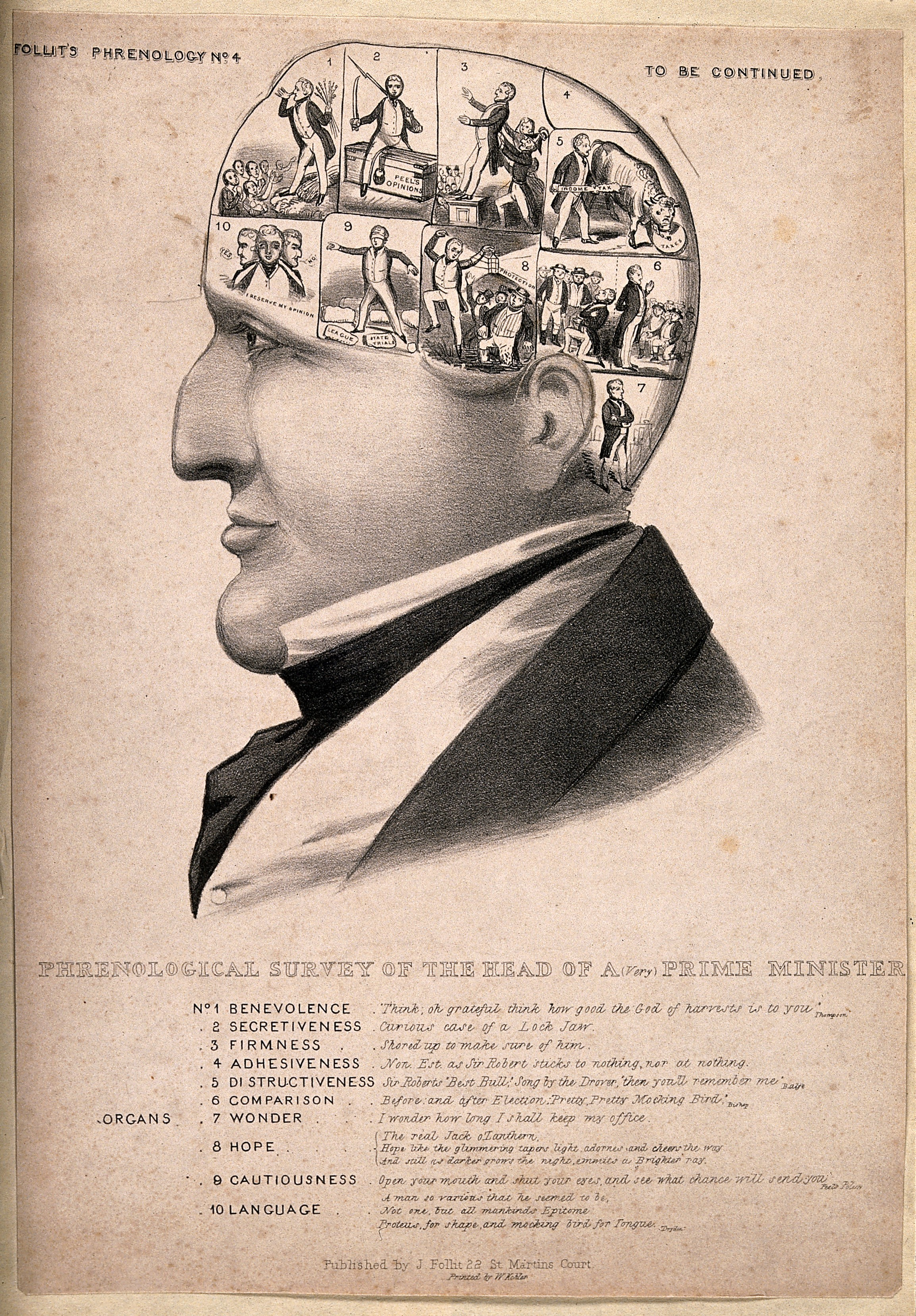
Parodic phrenological analysis of Peel, 1850.

The Peelites, also called the Peel faction, were a breakaway political faction of the British Conservative Party from 1846 to 1859. Initially led by Robert Peel, the former Prime Minister and Conservative Party leader in 1846, the Peelites supported free trade whilst the bulk of the Conservative Party remained protectionist. The Peelites later merged with the Whigs and Radicals to form the Liberal Party in 1859.

== Overview ==
The Peelites were characterised by commitment to free trade and a managerial, almost technocratic, approach to government. Though they sought to maintain the general principles of the Conservative Party, Peelites disagreed with the major wing of that party (the landed interest) on issues of trade, in particular the issue of whether agricultural prices should be artificially kept high by tariffs. The Peelites were often called the Liberal Conservatives in contrast to Protectionist Conservatives led by Benjamin Disraeli and Edward Smith-Stanley, 14th Earl of Derby.

Facing a serious famine in Ireland in 1845, the Peelites sought to lower food prices by repealing the Corn Laws. Peel was able to carry the repeal vote in the House of Commons, but only at the price of splitting the Conservative Party, a split which led to the fall of Peel's government in June 1846 and its replacement by a Whig government led by John Russell, 1st Earl Russell.

The leading members of the Peelite faction that developed after the 1846 split of the Conservative Party were the following:

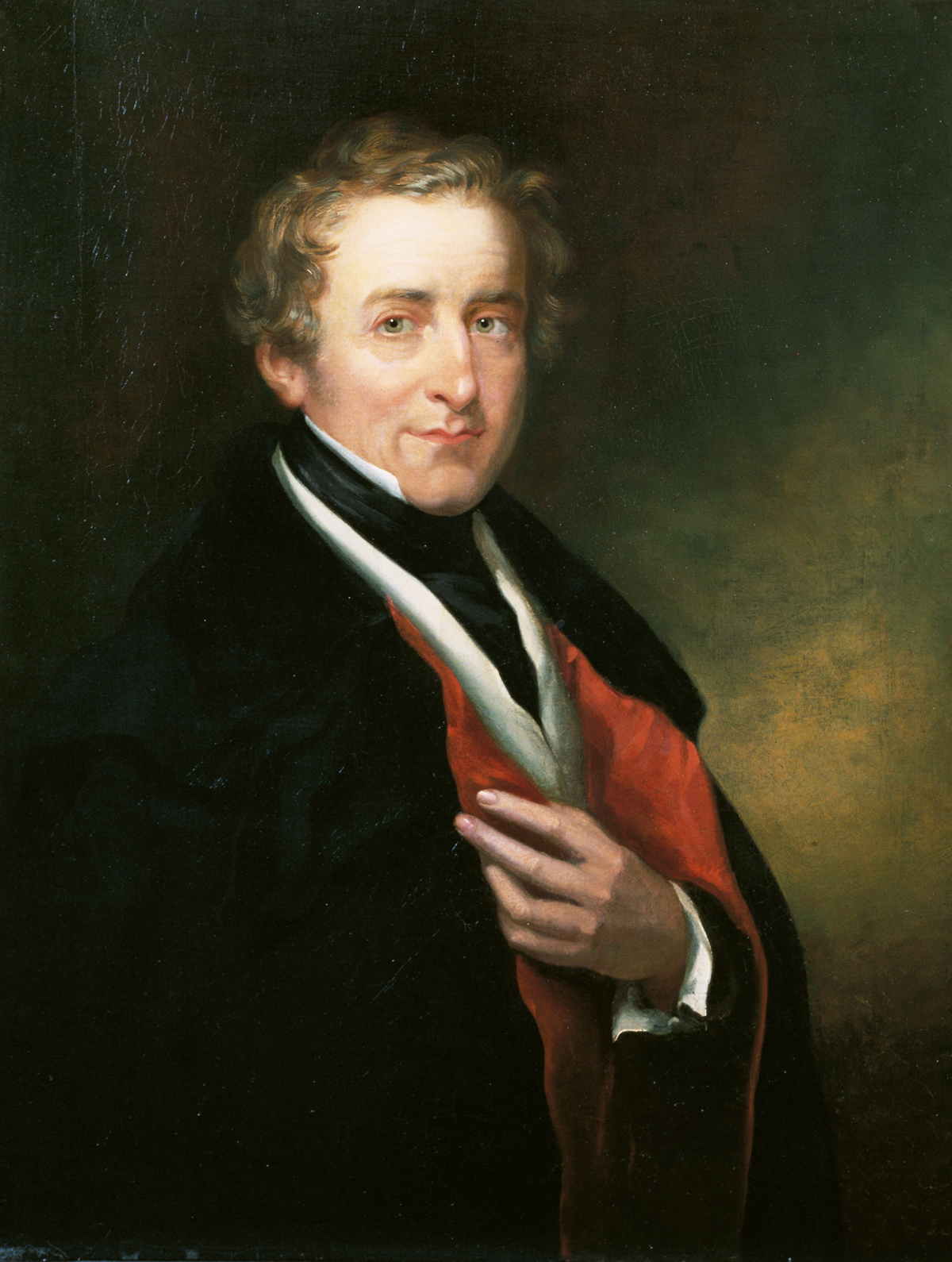
Sir Robert Peel

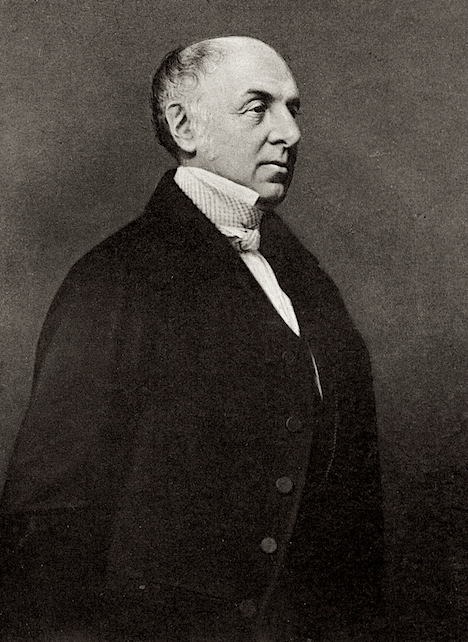
Sir James Graham

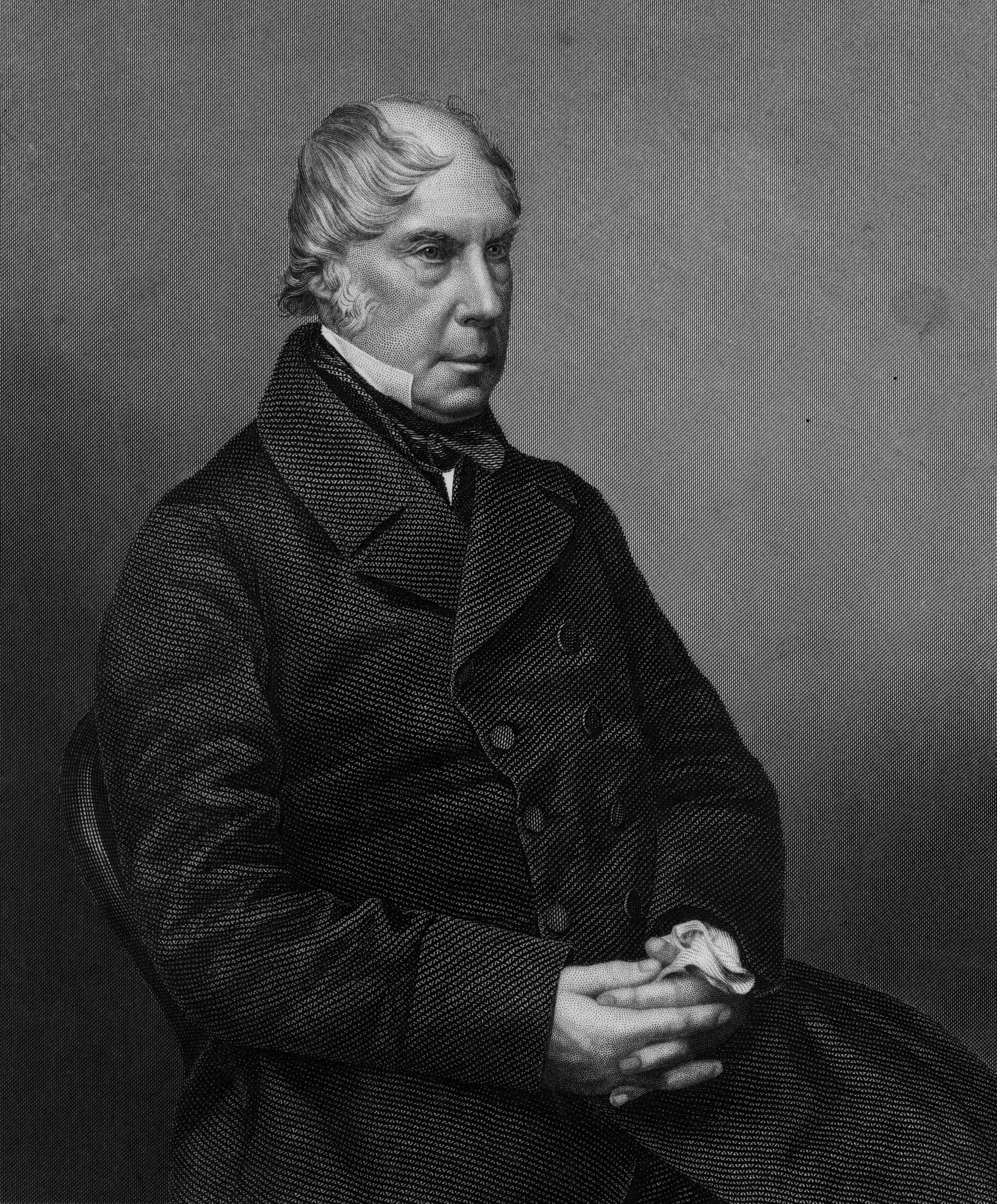
The Earl of Aberdeen

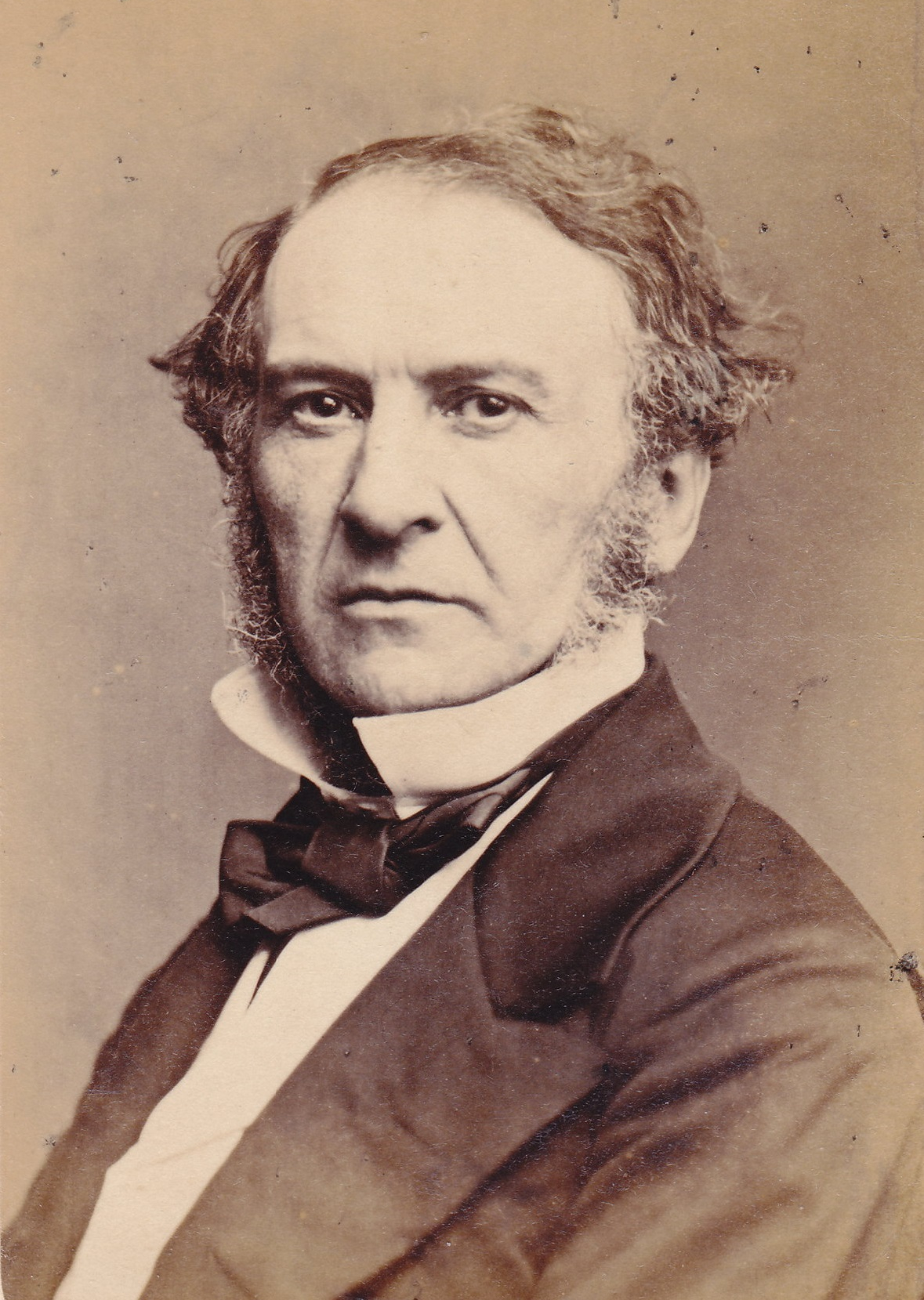
William Gladstone

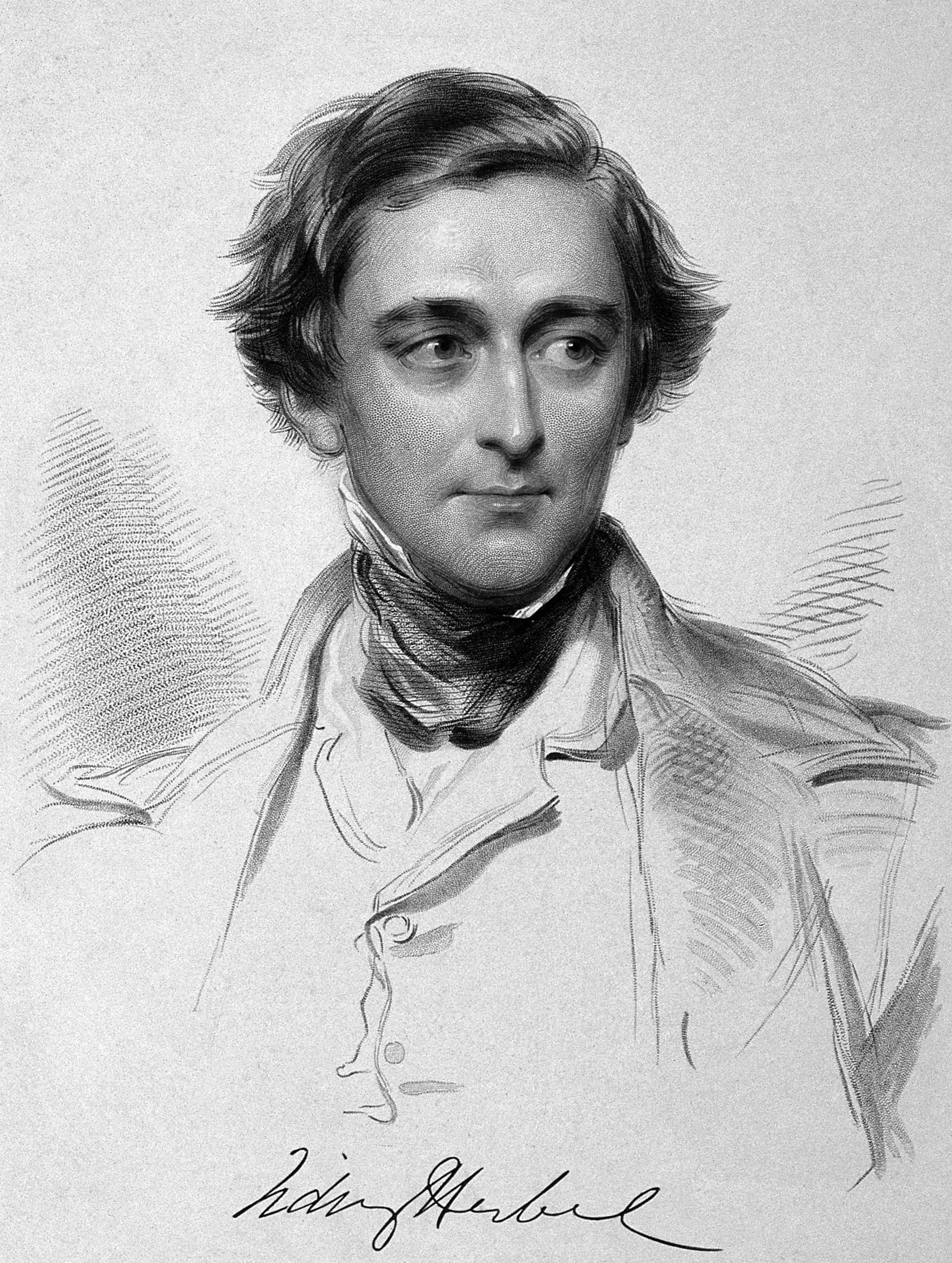
Sidney Herbert

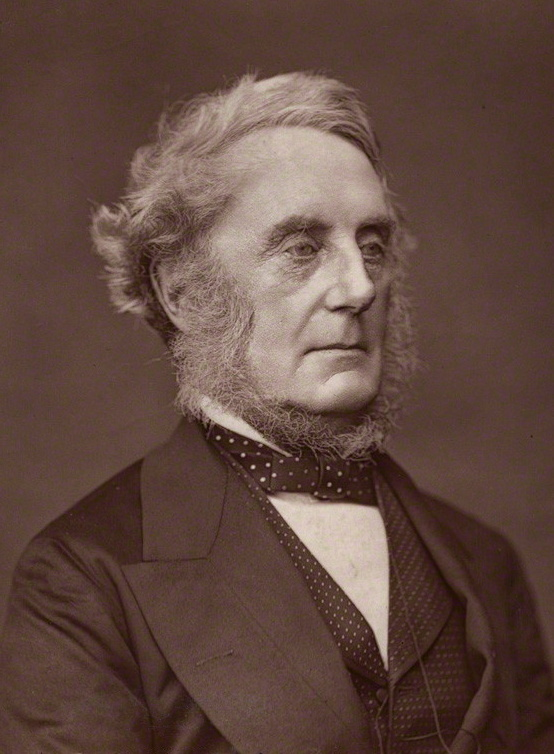
Edward Cardwell

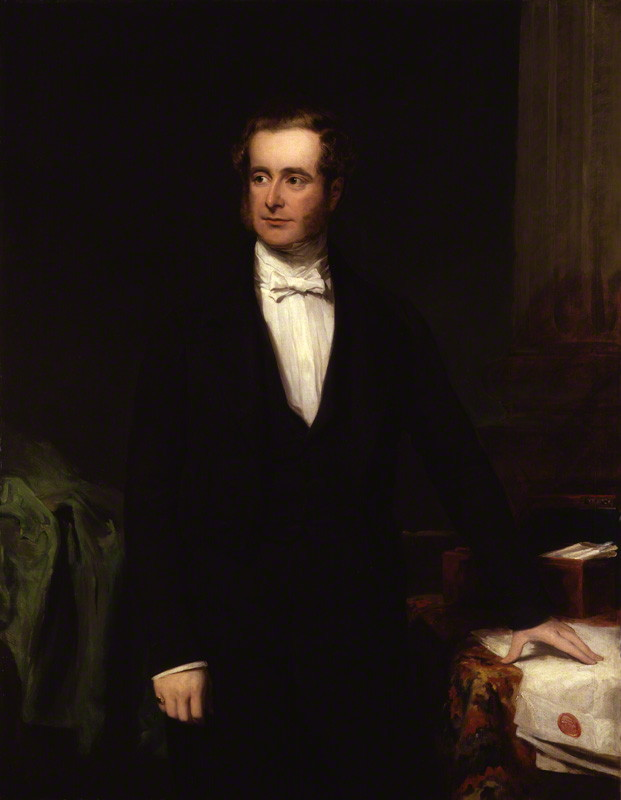
Lord Lincoln
(later Duke of Newcastle)

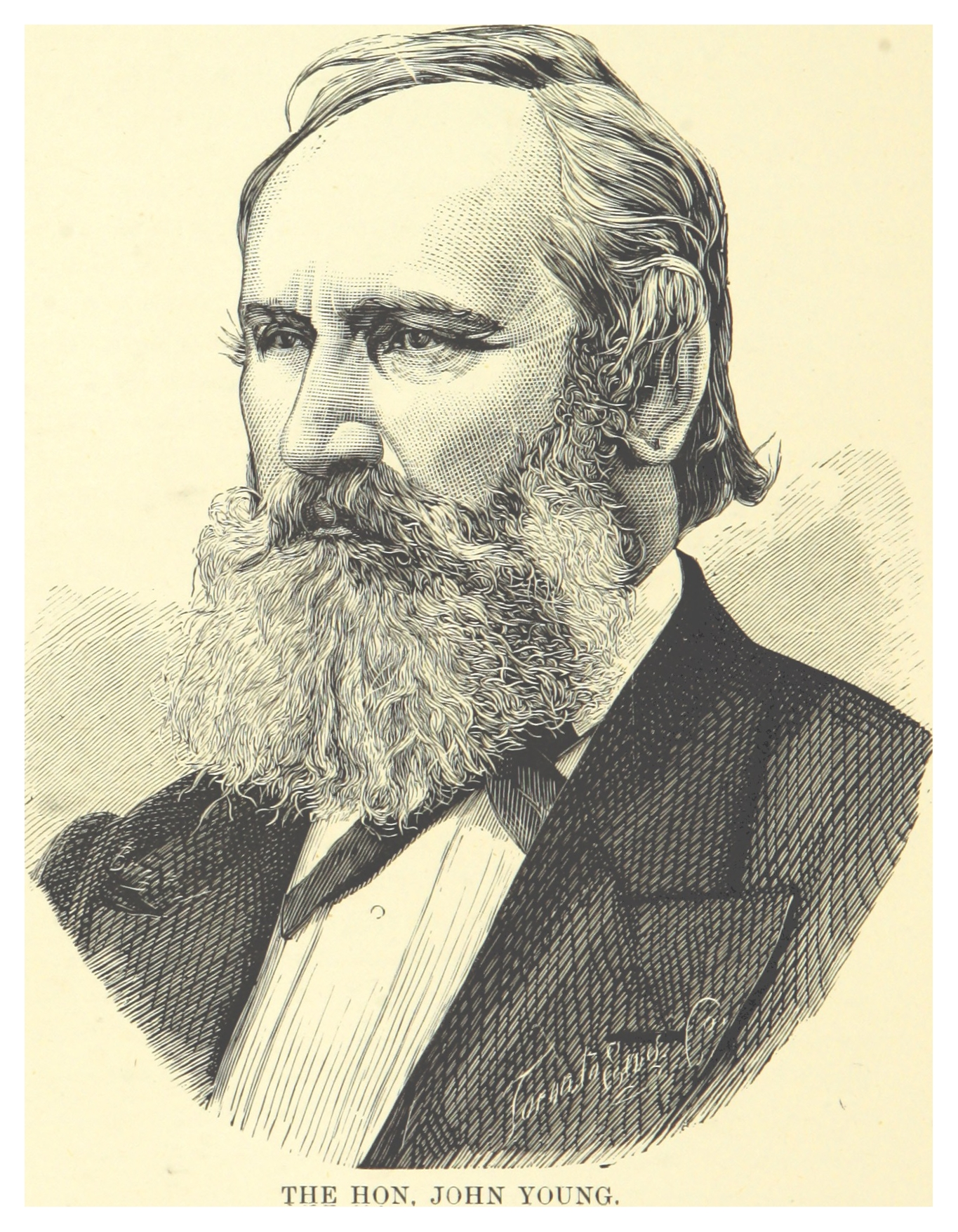
Sir John Young

The Peelites numbered about a third of the old Conservative party in the House of Commons following the 1847 general election. Their main political positions at that time were closer to the Protectionist Conservatives than to the Whigs and Radicals in parliament, except on the issue of free trade. The split had been so bitter on a personal level, with attacks on Peel by Protectionist Conservatives such as Lord George Bentinck and Benjamin Disraeli, that the Conservative Party was unable to reconcile the Peelites even after the Conservatives officially abandoned protection in 1852. The Peelites also had their own newspaper The Morning Chronicle to highlight their political position.

After Peel's death in 1850, the Peelite faction was led by Sir James Graham and Lord Aberdeen. In the 1852 general election, the number of Peelite MPs was estimated at 40. In that same year, George Hamilton-Gordon, 4th Earl of Aberdeen was invited by Queen Victoria to form a coalition government with the Whigs and the Radicals. This government fell in 1855 as a result of the unpopularity of its hesitant attitude during the Crimean War.

After the fall of the Aberdeen government, the Peelite faction took most of the blame for their management of the war in the Crimea. The group further lost cohesion with some members including William Ewart Gladstone, Sir James Graham and Sidney Herbert accepting cabinet posts in the new government led by Viscount Palmerston only to resign a few weeks later when the government agreed to hold a commission on the conduct of the recent war. Others stayed, including George Campbell, 8th Duke of Argyll and Stratford Canning, 1st Viscount Stratford de Redcliffe after which the Peelites with now no agreed overall leader appeared to be a band of independents rather than a putative political party. In the 1857 general election, their numbers in the House of Commons further decreased to around 26, or maybe less than 20 as identifying who was and who was not a Peelite became increasingly difficult.

The Peelites finally disappeared as a distinctive political entity after the 1859 general election. On 6 June 1859 a meeting was held at the Willis's Rooms, St James Street with most of the remaining Peelites agreed to combine with the Whigs, the Radicals and the Independent Irish Party members of the United Kingdom Parliament to bring down the Conservative government of Edward Smith-Stanley, 14th Earl of Derby in a vote of no confidence. The vote was won by the opposition by 323 votes to 310 on 10 June.

The subsequent creation of Palmerston's ministry out of this combination was the birth of the British Liberal Party. Several leading Peelites (including Gladstone, Herbert, Cardwell, and Newcastle, but notably not Graham, who was one of the driving forces behind the coalition) accepted cabinet posts in this ministry, though some Peelites became independents or returned to the Conservatives.

== See also ==
- Contributions to liberal theory
- Liberal democracy
- Liberalism
- Conservatism
- Conservatism in the United Kingdom
- Liberalism in the United Kingdom
- List of liberal parties
- Thatcherism
- Canningites, an earlier eponymous dissident group of centrist Tories in support of free trade
