= List of Michelin-starred restaurants in England =

The first Michelin Guide was published for the British Isles in 1911 and originally contained driving information to motorists. It ran for five years until it was suspended during World War I and resumed from 1922 until 1930 now titled 'Great Britain'. In 1974, a new guidebook was released in its modern form, solely a restaurant and hotel guide titled, 'Great Britain and Ireland.'

As of the 2026 guide, there are 181 restaurants in England (including Greater London) with a Michelin-star rating, a rating system used by the Michelin Guide to grade restaurants based on their quality.

== Northern England ==
As of the 2026 guide, there are 34 restaurants in Northern England with a Michelin-star rating.

Key
| 1 Michelin star | One Michelin star |
| 2 Michelin stars | Two Michelin stars |
| 3 Michelin stars | Three Michelin stars |
| — | The restaurant did not receive a star that year |
| Closed | The restaurant is no longer open |

Michelin-starred restaurants
| Name | Cuisine | Location | 2020 | 2021 | 2022 | 2023 | 2024 | 2025 | 2026 |
|---|---|---|---|---|---|---|---|---|---|
| Allium at Askham Hall | British | Cumbria – Askham | 1 Michelin star | 1 Michelin star | 1 Michelin star | 1 Michelin star | 1 Michelin star | 1 Michelin star | 1 Michelin star |
| Cedar Tree | Indian | Cumbria – Farlam | — | — | — | — | 1 Michelin star | 1 Michelin star | 1 Michelin star |
| Fifty Two | Modern | North Yorkshire – Harrogate | — | — | — | — | — | — | 1 Michelin star |
| Forest Side | British | Cumbria – Grasmere | 1 Michelin star | 1 Michelin star | 1 Michelin star | 1 Michelin star | 1 Michelin star | 1 Michelin star | 1 Michelin star |
| Forge | Modern | North Yorkshire – Middleton Tyas | — | — | — | — | — | 1 Michelin star | 1 Michelin star |
| Heft | British | Cumbria – High Newton | — | — | — | 1 Michelin star | 1 Michelin star | 1 Michelin star | 1 Michelin star |
| Hjem | Nordic | Northumberland – Wall | — | 1 Michelin star | 1 Michelin star | 1 Michelin star | 1 Michelin star | 1 Michelin star | Closed |
| House of Tides | Contemporary | Tyne and Wear – Newcastle | 1 Michelin star | 1 Michelin star | 1 Michelin star | 1 Michelin star | 1 Michelin star | 1 Michelin star | 1 Michelin star |
| HRiSHi | Indian | Cumbria – Windermere | 1 Michelin star | 1 Michelin star | 1 Michelin star | Closed | | | |
| JÖRO | Modern | South Yorkshire – Sheffield | — | — | — | — | — | — | 1 Michelin star |
| L'Enclume | British | Cumbria – Cartmel | 2 Michelin stars | 2 Michelin stars | 3 Michelin stars | 3 Michelin stars | 3 Michelin stars | 3 Michelin stars | 3 Michelin stars |
| Lake Road Kitchen | Contemporary | Cumbria – Ambleside | — | — | — | — | 1 Michelin star | 1 Michelin star | 1 Michelin star |
| Mana | British | Greater Manchester – Manchester | 1 Michelin star | 1 Michelin star | 1 Michelin star | 1 Michelin star | 1 Michelin star | 1 Michelin star | 1 Michelin star |
| Moor Hall | British | Lancashire – Aughton | 2 Michelin stars | 2 Michelin stars | 2 Michelin stars | 2 Michelin stars | 2 Michelin stars | 3 Michelin stars | 3 Michelin stars |
| Northcote | British | Lancashire – Langho | 1 Michelin star | 1 Michelin star | 1 Michelin star | 1 Michelin star | 1 Michelin star | 1 Michelin star | 1 Michelin star |
| Old Stamp House | Contemporary | Cumbria – Ambleside | 1 Michelin star | 1 Michelin star | 1 Michelin star | 1 Michelin star | 1 Michelin star | 1 Michelin star | 1 Michelin star |
| Pentonbridge Inn | British | Cumbria – Penton | — | — | — | 1 Michelin star | 1 Michelin star | 1 Michelin star | 1 Michelin star |
| Pine | Contemporary | Tyne and Wear – Newcastle | — | — | 1 Michelin star | 1 Michelin star | 1 Michelin star | 1 Michelin star | 1 Michelin star |
| Pipe and Glass | British | East Riding of Yorkshire – South Dalton | 1 Michelin star | 1 Michelin star | 1 Michelin star | 1 Michelin star | 1 Michelin star | 1 Michelin star | 1 Michelin star |
| Restaurant Fraiche | French | Merseyside – Birkenhead | 1 Michelin star | 1 Michelin star | 1 Michelin star | 1 Michelin star | Closed | | |
| Restaurant Mýse | Contemporary | North Yorkshire – Hovingham | — | — | — | — | 1 Michelin star | 1 Michelin star | 1 Michelin star |
| Rogan & Co. | British | Cumbria – Cartmel | 1 Michelin star | 1 Michelin star | 1 Michelin star | 1 Michelin star | 1 Michelin star | 1 Michelin star | 1 Michelin star |
| Roots | Contemporary | North Yorkshire – York | — | 1 Michelin star | 1 Michelin star | 1 Michelin star | 1 Michelin star | 1 Michelin star | 1 Michelin star |
| Shaun Rankin at Grantley Hall | British | North Yorkshire – Grantley | — | 1 Michelin star | 1 Michelin star | 1 Michelin star | 1 Michelin star | 1 Michelin star | 1 Michelin star |
| Simon Radley at The Chester Grosvenor | Contemporary | Cheshire – Chester | 1 Michelin star | 1 Michelin star | Closed | | | | |
| Skof | Creative | Greater Manchester – Manchester | — | — | — | — | — | 1 Michelin star | 1 Michelin star |
| Sō–lō | British | Lancashire – Aughton | — | — | — | 1 Michelin star | 1 Michelin star | 1 Michelin star | 1 Michelin star |
| Solstice by Kenny Atkinson | British | Tyne and Wear – Newcastle | — | — | — | 1 Michelin star | 1 Michelin star | 1 Michelin star | 1 Michelin star |
| Source | Contemporary | Cumbria – Windermere | — | — | — | 1 Michelin star | 1 Michelin star | 1 Michelin star | 1 Michelin star |
| The Angel | Contemporary | North Yorkshire – Hetton | 1 Michelin star | 1 Michelin star | 1 Michelin star | 1 Michelin star | 1 Michelin star | 1 Michelin star | 1 Michelin star |
| The Barn | British | Lancashire – Aughton | — | — | 1 Michelin star | 1 Michelin star | 1 Michelin star | 1 Michelin star | 1 Michelin star |
| The Black Swan | British | North Yorkshire – Oldstead | 1 Michelin star | 1 Michelin star | 1 Michelin star | 1 Michelin star | 1 Michelin star | 1 Michelin star | 1 Michelin star |
| The Cottage in the Wood | British | Cumbria – Braithwaite | 1 Michelin star | 1 Michelin star | 1 Michelin star | 1 Michelin star | 1 Michelin star | 1 Michelin star | 1 Michelin star |
| The Dog and Gun | British | Cumbria – Skelton | — | — | 1 Michelin star | 1 Michelin star | 1 Michelin star | 1 Michelin star | 1 Michelin star |
| The Man Behind the Curtain | British | West Yorkshire – Leeds | 1 Michelin star | 1 Michelin star | 1 Michelin star | 1 Michelin star | Closed | | |
| The Raby Hunt | British | Durham – Summerhouse | 2 Michelin stars | 2 Michelin stars | 2 Michelin stars | 2 Michelin stars | Closed | | |
| The Samling | Contemporary | Cumbria – Ambleside | — | — | — | 1 Michelin star | 1 Michelin star | 1 Michelin star | 1 Michelin star |
| The Star Inn at Harome | British | North Yorkshire – Harome | 1 Michelin star | 1 Michelin star | 1 Michelin star | 1 Michelin star | 1 Michelin star | 1 Michelin star | 1 Michelin star |
| White Swan | British | Lancashire – Fence | 1 Michelin star | 1 Michelin star | 1 Michelin star | 1 Michelin star | 1 Michelin star | 1 Michelin star | 1 Michelin star |
| Winteringham Fields | Contemporary | Lincolnshire – Winteringham | 1 Michelin star | 1 Michelin star | 1 Michelin star | 1 Michelin star | 1 Michelin star | 1 Michelin star | 1 Michelin star |
| Reference | | | | | | | | | |

== Southern England ==
As of the 2026 guide, there are 46 restaurants in Southern England with a Michelin-star rating.

Key
| 1 Michelin star | One Michelin star |
| 2 Michelin stars | Two Michelin stars |
| 3 Michelin stars | Three Michelin stars |
| — | The restaurant did not receive a star that year |
| Closed | The restaurant is no longer open |

Michelin-starred restaurants
| Name | Cuisine | Location | 2020 | 2021 | 2022 | 2023 | 2024 | 2025 | 2026 |
|---|---|---|---|---|---|---|---|---|---|
| 33 The Homend | British | Herefordshire – Ledbury | — | — | — | — | — | 1 Michelin star | 1 Michelin star |
| Àclèaf | Contemporary | Devon – Plymouth | — | — | — | 1 Michelin star | 1 Michelin star | 1 Michelin star | 1 Michelin star |
| Artichoke | British | Buckinghamshire – Amersham | 1 Michelin star | 1 Michelin star | 1 Michelin star | 1 Michelin star | 1 Michelin star | 1 Michelin star | 1 Michelin star |
| Le Manoir aux Quat'Saisons | French | Oxfordshire – Great Milton | 2 Michelin stars | 2 Michelin stars | 2 Michelin stars | 2 Michelin stars | 2 Michelin stars | 2 Michelin stars | Closed |
| Ben Wilkinson at The Pass | British | West Sussex – South Lodge | — | — | — | 1 Michelin star | 1 Michelin star | 1 Michelin star | 1 Michelin star |
| Bulrush | British | Bristol – Cotham | 1 Michelin star | 1 Michelin star | 1 Michelin star | 1 Michelin star | 1 Michelin star | 1 Michelin star | 1 Michelin star |
| Casamia | Spanish | Bristol – Redcliffe | 1 Michelin star | 1 Michelin star | 1 Michelin star | Closed | | | |
| Coworth Park | British | Berkshire – Ascot | 1 Michelin star | 1 Michelin star | 1 Michelin star | Closed | | | |
| Crocadon | Contemporary | Cornwall – St Mellion | — | — | — | — | 1 Michelin star | 1 Michelin star | Closed |
| Gidleigh Park | Contemporary | Devon – Gidleigh | — | — | — | 1 Michelin star | 1 Michelin star | 1 Michelin star | 1 Michelin star |
| Gravetye Manor | British | West Sussex – West Hoathly | 1 Michelin star | 1 Michelin star | 1 Michelin star | 1 Michelin star | 1 Michelin star | 1 Michelin star | 1 Michelin star |
| Hide and Fox | British | Kent – Hythe | — | 1 Michelin star | 1 Michelin star | 1 Michelin star | 1 Michelin star | 2 Michelin stars | 2 Michelin stars |
| Interlude | Contemporary | West Sussex – Lower Beeding | 1 Michelin star | 1 Michelin star | 1 Michelin star | 1 Michelin star | 1 Michelin star | 1 Michelin star | 1 Michelin star |
| L'Ortolan | French | Berkshire – Reading | 1 Michelin star | 1 Michelin star | — | — | Closed | | |
| Le Champignon Sauvage | French | Gloucestershire – Cheltenham | 1 Michelin star | 1 Michelin star | 1 Michelin star | 1 Michelin star | 1 Michelin star | 1 Michelin star | 1 Michelin star |
| Lumière | French | Gloucestershire – Cheltenham | — | — | — | 1 Michelin star | 1 Michelin star | 1 Michelin star | 1 Michelin star |
| Lympstone Manor | Contemporary | Devon – Lympstone | 1 Michelin star | 1 Michelin star | 1 Michelin star | 1 Michelin star | 1 Michelin star | 1 Michelin star | 1 Michelin star |
| Maré | Brazilian | East Sussex – Brighton and Hove | — | — | — | — | — | — | 1 Michelin star |
| Mark Poynton at Caistor Hall | British | Norfolk – Caistor St Edmund | — | — | — | — | — | 1 Michelin star | 1 Michelin star |
| Meadowsweet | British | Norfolk – Holt | — | — | 1 Michelin star | 1 Michelin star | 1 Michelin star | 1 Michelin star | 1 Michelin star |
| Midsummer House | Contemporary | Cambridgeshire – Cambridge | 2 Michelin stars | 2 Michelin stars | 2 Michelin stars | 2 Michelin stars | 2 Michelin stars | 2 Michelin stars | 2 Michelin stars |
| Morston Hall | British | Norfolk – Morston | 1 Michelin star | 1 Michelin star | 1 Michelin star | 1 Michelin star | 1 Michelin star | 1 Michelin star | 1 Michelin star |
| Nut Tree Inn | British | Oxfordshire – Murcott | 1 Michelin star | 1 Michelin star | 1 Michelin star | 1 Michelin star | 1 Michelin star | 1 Michelin star | 1 Michelin star |
| Olive Tree | Contemporary | Somerset – Bath | 1 Michelin star | 1 Michelin star | 1 Michelin star | 1 Michelin star | 1 Michelin star | 1 Michelin star | 1 Michelin star |
| Osip | British | Somerset – Bruton | — | 1 Michelin star | 1 Michelin star | 1 Michelin star | 1 Michelin star | 1 Michelin star | 1 Michelin star |
| Outlaw's Fish Kitchen | Seafood | Cornwall – Port Isaac | 1 Michelin star | 1 Michelin star | 1 Michelin star | 1 Michelin star | 1 Michelin star | 1 Michelin star | 1 Michelin star |
| Outlaw's New Road | Seafood | Cornwall – Port Isaac | — | 1 Michelin star | 1 Michelin star | 1 Michelin star | 1 Michelin star | 1 Michelin star | 1 Michelin star |
| Oxford Kitchen | British | Oxfordshire – Oxford | 1 Michelin star | Closed | | | | | |
| Paco Tapas | Spanish | Bristol – Redcliffe | 1 Michelin star | 1 Michelin star | 1 Michelin star | 1 Michelin star | — | Closed | |
| Paul Ainsworth at No.6 | Contemporary | Cornwall – Padstow | 1 Michelin star | 1 Michelin star | 1 Michelin star | 1 Michelin star | 1 Michelin star | 1 Michelin star | 1 Michelin star |
| Pea Porridge | Mediterranean | Suffolk – Bury St Edmunds | — | 1 Michelin star | 1 Michelin star | 1 Michelin star | 1 Michelin star | 1 Michelin star | 1 Michelin star |
| Restaurant Hywel Jones by Lucknam Park | British | Wiltshire – Colerne | 1 Michelin star | 1 Michelin star | 1 Michelin star | 1 Michelin star | 1 Michelin star | 1 Michelin star | 1 Michelin star |
| Restaurant Nathan Outlaw | Seafood | Cornwall – Port Isaac | 2 Michelin stars | Closed | | | | | |
| Restaurant Tristan | British | West Sussex – Horsham | 1 Michelin star | 1 Michelin star | 1 Michelin star | Closed | | | |
| Restaurant Twenty-Two | Contemporary | Cambridgeshire – Cambridge | — | — | — | 1 Michelin star | 1 Michelin star | 1 Michelin star | 1 Michelin star |
| Sorrel | British | Surrey – Dorking | 1 Michelin star | 1 Michelin star | 1 Michelin star | 1 Michelin star | 1 Michelin star | 1 Michelin star | 1 Michelin star |
| Sportsman | British | Kent – Whitstable | 1 Michelin star | 1 Michelin star | 1 Michelin star | 1 Michelin star | 1 Michelin star | 1 Michelin star | 1 Michelin star |
| Stark | British | Essex – East Mersea (Note: Restaurant relocated from Broadstairs, Kent to its current location in 2025) | 1 Michelin star | 1 Michelin star | 1 Michelin star | 1 Michelin star | 1 Michelin star | 1 Michelin star | 1 Michelin star |
| Starling | British | Surrey – Esher | — | — | — | — | — | 1 Michelin star | 1 Michelin star |
| Store | Contemporary | Norfolk – Stoke Holy Cross | — | — | — | 1 Michelin star | 1 Michelin star | — | — |
| The Blackbird | Contemporary | Berkshire – Newbury | 1 Michelin star | 1 Michelin star | Closed | | | | |
| The Black Rat | British | Hampshire – Winchester | 1 Michelin star | — | Closed | | | | |
| The Bridge Arms | British | Kent – Bridge | — | — | 1 Michelin star | 1 Michelin star | 1 Michelin star | 1 Michelin star | — |
| The Bybrook | British | Wiltshire – Castle Combe | 1 Michelin star | 1 Michelin star | 1 Michelin star | 1 Michelin star | 1 Michelin star | 1 Michelin star | 1 Michelin star |
| The Clock House | British | Surrey – Ripley | 1 Michelin star | 1 Michelin star | 1 Michelin star | 1 Michelin star | Closed | | |
| The Coach | British | Buckinghamshire – Marlow | 1 Michelin star | 1 Michelin star | 1 Michelin star | 1 Michelin star | 1 Michelin star | 1 Michelin star | 1 Michelin star |
| The Crown | British | Berkshire – Burchetts Green | 1 Michelin star | 1 Michelin star | — | — | — | — | — |
| The Dining Room | Contemporary | Wiltshire – Malmesbury | 2 Michelin stars | 2 Michelin stars | 1 Michelin star | 1 Michelin star | 1 Michelin star | 1 Michelin star | 1 Michelin star |
| The Fordwich Arms | Contemporary | Kent – Fordwich | 1 Michelin star | 1 Michelin star | 1 Michelin star | 1 Michelin star | 1 Michelin star | 1 Michelin star | 1 Michelin star |
| The Elephant | British | Devon – Torquay | 1 Michelin star | 1 Michelin star | 1 Michelin star | 1 Michelin star | 1 Michelin star | 1 Michelin star | 1 Michelin star |
| The Fat Duck | Contemporary | Berkshire – Bray | 3 Michelin stars | 3 Michelin stars | 3 Michelin stars | 3 Michelin stars | 3 Michelin stars | 3 Michelin stars | 3 Michelin stars |
| The Hand and Flowers | British | Buckinghamshire – Marlow | 2 Michelin stars | 2 Michelin stars | 2 Michelin stars | 2 Michelin stars | 2 Michelin stars | 2 Michelin stars | 2 Michelin stars |
| The Hind's Head | British | Berkshire – Bray | 1 Michelin star | 1 Michelin star | 1 Michelin star | 1 Michelin star | 1 Michelin star | 1 Michelin star | 1 Michelin star |
| The Latymer | Contemporary | Surrey – Bagshot | 1 Michelin star | 1 Michelin star | 1 Michelin star | 1 Michelin star | 1 Michelin star | 1 Michelin star | 1 Michelin star |
| The Masons Arms | French | Devon – Knowstone | 1 Michelin star | 1 Michelin star | 1 Michelin star | 1 Michelin star | 1 Michelin star | 1 Michelin star | 1 Michelin star |
| The Neptune | Contemporary | Norfolk – Hunstanton | 1 Michelin star | 1 Michelin star | 1 Michelin star | 1 Michelin star | 1 Michelin star | 1 Michelin star | 1 Michelin star |
| The Pony and Trap | British | Somerset – Newtown (Chew Magna) | 1 Michelin star | Closed | | | | | |
| The Red Lion Free House | British | Wiltshire – East Chisenbury | 1 Michelin star | — | — | — | — | — | — |
| The Tudor Pass | Contemporary | Surrey – Egham | 1 Michelin star | 1 Michelin star | 1 Michelin star | 1 Michelin star | 1 Michelin star | 1 Michelin star | 1 Michelin star |
| The Waterside Inn | French | Berkshire – Bray | 3 Michelin stars | 3 Michelin stars | 3 Michelin stars | 3 Michelin stars | 3 Michelin stars | 3 Michelin stars | 3 Michelin stars |
| Thomas Carr 1873 | Contemporary | Devon – Ilfracombe | 1 Michelin star | 1 Michelin star | — | Closed | | | |
| Tim Allen's Flitch of Bacon | British | Essex – Great Dunmow | 1 Michelin star | — | — | — | — | Closed | |
| Ugly Butterfly | British | Cornwall – Newquay | — | — | — | — | — | — | 1 Michelin star |
| Wilks | French | Bristol – Redland | 1 Michelin star | Closed | | | | | |
| Wilsons | Modern | Bristol – Cotham | — | — | — | — | — | 1 Michelin star | 1 Michelin star |
| Woodspeen | Contemporary | Berkshire – Newbury | 1 Michelin star | 1 Michelin star | 1 Michelin star | — | — | — | — |
| Woven by Adam Smith | Contemporary | Berkshire – Ascot | — | — | — | 1 Michelin star | 1 Michelin star | 1 Michelin star | 1 Michelin star |
| Reference | | | | | | | | | |

== The Midlands ==
As of the 2026 guide, there are 13 restaurants in the Midlands with a Michelin-star rating.

Key
| 1 Michelin star | One Michelin star |
| 2 Michelin stars | Two Michelin stars |
| — | The restaurant did not receive a star that year |
| Closed | The restaurant is no longer open |

Michelin-starred restaurants
| Name | Cuisine | Location | 2020 | 2021 | 2022 | 2023 | 2024 | 2025 | 2026 |
|---|---|---|---|---|---|---|---|---|---|
| Adam's | Contemporary | West Midlands – Birmingham | 1 Michelin star | 1 Michelin star | 1 Michelin star | 1 Michelin star | 1 Michelin star | 1 Michelin star | 1 Michelin star |
| Alchemilla | British | Nottinghamshire – Nottingham | 1 Michelin star | 1 Michelin star | 1 Michelin star | 1 Michelin star | 1 Michelin star | 1 Michelin star | 1 Michelin star |
| Carters of Mosely | British | West Midlands – Birmingham | 1 Michelin star | 1 Michelin star | 1 Michelin star | 1 Michelin star | Closed | | |
| Grace & Savour | Contemporary | West Midlands – Hampton in Arden | — | — | — | 1 Michelin star | 1 Michelin star | 1 Michelin star | 1 Michelin star |
| Hambleton Hall | British | Rutland – Hambleton | 1 Michelin star | 1 Michelin star | 1 Michelin star | 1 Michelin star | 1 Michelin star | 1 Michelin star | 1 Michelin star |
| John's House | Contemporary | Leicestershire – Mountsorrel | 1 Michelin star | 1 Michelin star | 1 Michelin star | 1 Michelin star | 1 Michelin star | 1 Michelin star | 1 Michelin star |
| Opheem | Indian | West Midlands – Birmingham | 1 Michelin star | 1 Michelin star | 1 Michelin star | 1 Michelin star | 2 Michelin stars | 2 Michelin stars | 2 Michelin stars |
| Peel's | British | West Midlands – Hampton in Arden | 1 Michelin star | 1 Michelin star | 1 Michelin star | Closed | | | |
| Pensons | British | Worcestershire – Tenbury Wells | 1 Michelin star | 1 Michelin star | 1 Michelin star | 1 Michelin star | — | Closed | |
| Purnell's | Contemporary | West Midlands – Birmingham | 1 Michelin star | 1 Michelin star | 1 Michelin star | 1 Michelin star | 1 Michelin star | Closed | |
| Restaurant Sat Bains | Contemporary | Nottinghamshire – Nottingham | 2 Michelin stars | 2 Michelin stars | 2 Michelin stars | 2 Michelin stars | 2 Michelin stars | 2 Michelin stars | 2 Michelin stars |
| Salt | British | Warwickshire – Stratford-upon-Avon | 1 Michelin star | 1 Michelin star | 1 Michelin star | 1 Michelin star | — | — | — |
| Simpsons | Contemporary | West Midlands – Birmingham | 1 Michelin star | 1 Michelin star | 1 Michelin star | 1 Michelin star | 1 Michelin star | 1 Michelin star | 1 Michelin star |
| The Boat | British | West Midlands – Lichfield | — | — | — | — | — | — | 1 Michelin star |
| The Cross | British | Warwickshire – Kenilworth | 1 Michelin star | 1 Michelin star | 1 Michelin star | 1 Michelin star | 1 Michelin star | 1 Michelin star | 1 Michelin star |
| The Royal Oak | British | Warwickshire – Whatcote | 1 Michelin star | 1 Michelin star | 1 Michelin star | 1 Michelin star | 1 Michelin star | 1 Michelin star | 1 Michelin star |
| The Wilderness | Modern | West Midlands – Birmingham | — | — | — | — | — | — | 1 Michelin star |
| Upstairs by Tom Shepherd | Modern | West Midlands – Lichfield | — | — | 1 Michelin star | 1 Michelin star | 1 Michelin star | 1 Michelin star | 1 Michelin star |
| Reference | | | | | | | | | |

== See also ==
- List of Michelin 3-star restaurants in the United Kingdom
- List of Michelin-starred restaurants in Greater London
- List of Michelin-starred restaurants in Ireland
- List of Michelin-starred restaurants in Scotland
- List of Michelin-starred restaurants in Wales
- Lists of restaurants
