= Positive Organ Company =

Organ builder in London

Positive Organ Company Ltd, Positive Organ Company (1922) Ltd
- Formerly: WR Andrew, Casson’s Patent Organ Co Ltd
- Founded: 1898
- Founder: Thomas Casson
- Defunct: 1941
- Fate: Terminated
- Headquarters: London, England, UK
- Area served: International
- Key people: Thomas Casson, William Raeburn Andrew, Lewis Casson
- Products: Pipe Organ Builders

The Positive Organ Company (also known as Casson's Patent Organ Co Ltd and Positive Organ Company (1922) Ltd but often referred to as Casson Positive) was an English pipe organ maker, established in London in 1898 by Thomas Casson, although with some earlier antecedents. The firm was best known for small, one-manual organs, which were able to be moved about. It ceased trading in 1941, but the name was revived in 2020 with a new, unrelated organ builder.

== William Andrew ==
William Raeburn St Clair Andrew (1853-1914) was the son of the Indian railwayman, Sir William Patrick Andrew. His mother was Anne Raeburn. She was a granddaughter of the painter Sir Henry Raeburn, of whom Andrew wrote a biography: Life or Sir Henry Raeburn, R.A. (1886: W.H. Allen & Company).

He was educated at Harrow and Exeter College, Oxford, and was called to the bar in 1878. He did not long practise: by 1881 he was a non-practising barrister and by 1891 a retired one. He did write a law text book (with the future MP Charles Conybeare), which was published in 1883.

He married first, in 1877, Frances Gardiner Ramsay Inglis, who died in 1892, and secondly, in 1893, Ellen Nichols.

In 1896 Andrew set up as an organ builder, in Kilburn High Road. The following year he moved to Berkley Road NW1. A year after that, he sold the firm to Thomas Casson. Although the National Pipe Organ Register has records of seven organs with Andrew's name, most are also labelled Positive Organ Co.

Andrew died in 1914, and is buried in Kensal Green Cemetery.

== Thomas Casson ==
Thomas Casson (1843-1911) was the son of William Casson. William's brother, John, founded Casson's Bank in Wales, and young Thomas was sent to work for him. Casson married Laura Ann Holland-Thomas (1843-1912); they had seven children, two of whom were Sir Lewis Casson, the actor, and Dr Elizabeth Casson, the founder of the occupational therapy school, Dorset House. Casson's Bank was acquired by The North and South Wales Bank in 1875, and Casson continued to work for the new owners. Casson's first love, however, was music, and, in particular, organs. Lewis, having left Ruthin Grammar School with virtually no qualifications, was apprenticed to an iron foundry in 1891, which included working on pipe organs. After that, Lewis was transferred to a firm of organ-builders in Shepherd's Bush, Michell & Thynne; Thomas bought in as a partner in 1889. He spent so much time travelling between the family home in Denbigh and Shepherd's Bush that the Bank asked him to resign. Thomas then moved the whole family to London in 1892.

Before moving to London, Casson had been producing organ inventions. There are registered patents in his name for couplers (1882 and 1884), pneumatic action (1889) and electric action (1889). His early work in Denbigh was with John Bellamy. The 1882 rebuild of the William Hill organ at St Mary's, Denbigh, is attributed to Casson; Bellamy subsequently rebuilt it again in 1909. He fell out with Bellamy and set up on his own, although that venture failed.

He commissioned Wadsworth Bros of Manchester to build an organ to his design for the 1885 International Inventions Exhibition in South Kensington, although the National Pipe Organ Register has a second entry which attributes this organ to Casson. He established Casson's Patent Organ Co Ltd in 1887. After moving to London there are two further patents: pneumatic action (1894) and action (melody) (1903). In doing so, he designed what would become known as his trademark one-manual 'Casson Positive Organ'. Along with the innovative designs, Casson wrote The Modern Organ: A Consideration of the Prevalent Theoretical and Practical Defects in its construction with plans and suggestions for their removal (1883: T Gee & Son) and The Pedal Organ: Its History, Design & Control (1905: W Reeves). Lewis also obtained patents: pneumatic action (1902), and (1905)

Despite a very Evangelical upbringing in Wales, the Casson family worshipped in London in famously Anglo-Catholic churches: first at St Cuthbert's, Philbeach Gardens and then at St Augustine's, Kilburn. An early Casson instrument (1890) was built for the parish church of St Mary and All Saints, Little Walsingham, which, in 1922, would be the church where Fr Hope Patten revived the shrine of Our Lady of Walsingham. This organ was lost when the church was badly damaged by fire in 1961.

== Positive Organ Company ==
In 1898 Casson's younger brother Randal (father of the architect Sir Hugh Casson) helped him establish the Positive Organ Company. In doing so he acquired Andrew's firm. The Positive Organ Company was a prolific manufacturer of organs. Positive organs are small, usually one-manual, pipe organs that are intended to be capable of being more or less mobile. Later in their development they acquired a hanging pedal.

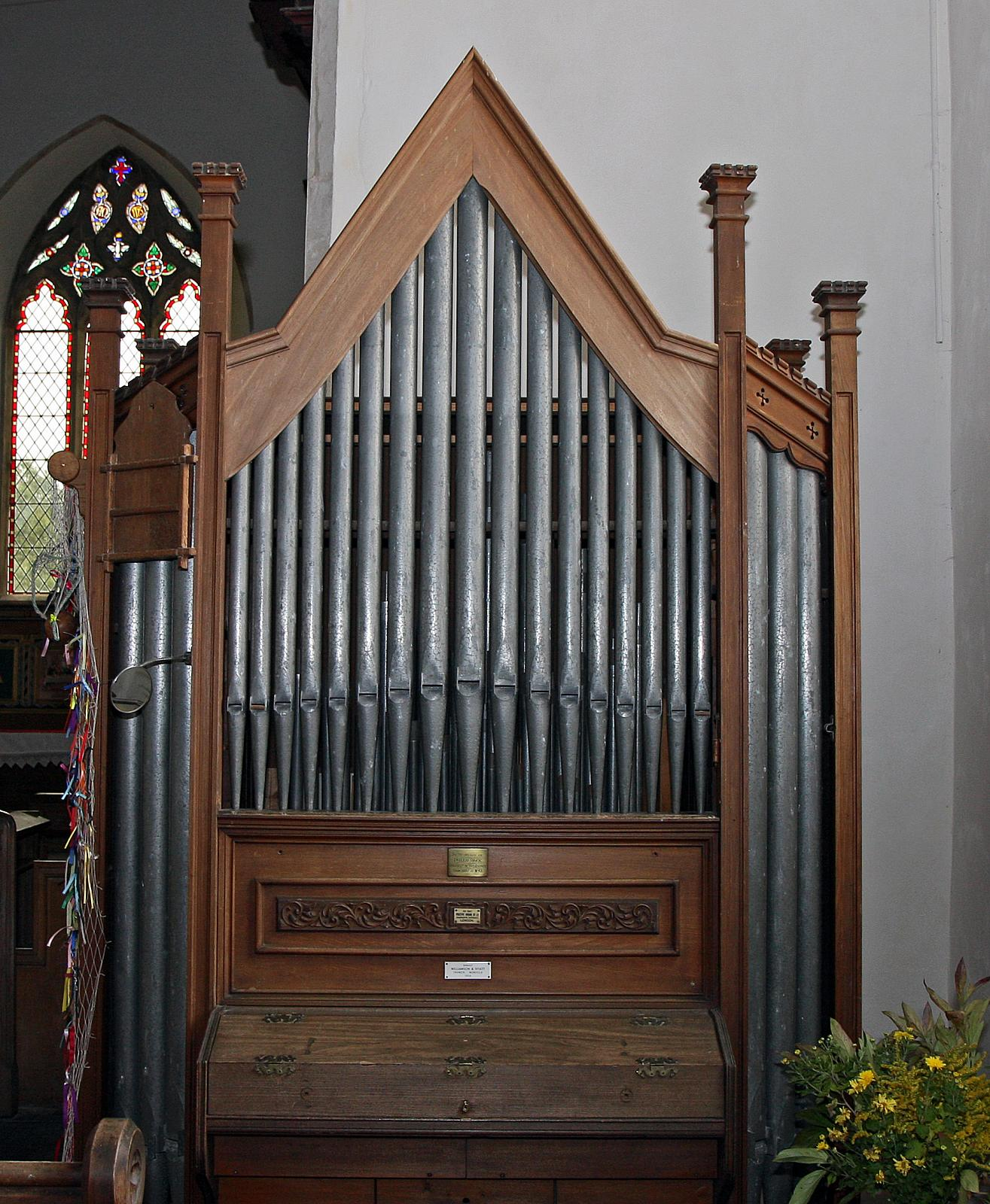
The Positive Organ Company organ at St John and St Mary, Stiffkey

The small size of the one-manual Casson Positives meant that they were ideally suited to small village churches. An extant example is a 5-stop model at St John and St Mary, Stiffkey, in Norfolk, made famous by the defrocking of its Rector, Harold Davidson, who then became a showman and was killed by a lion in Skegness. The Casson Positive at Stiffkey is undated, but may have been installed during Davidson's incumbency (1906-32). An early (1890) 9-stop Casson Patent is maintained at St Mary the Virgin, Horton, Northumberland. A late (1926) 5-stop Casson Positive, still playable, is at the private chapel of St Paul at Stansted House in Sussex. The chapel has a 3-bay nave; it was designed by Lewis Way but restored by Harry Goodhart-Rendel in 1926, at which point the Casson Positive was installed.

The small size of the Casson Positives also meant that they were well-suited to large churches and cathedrals which needed additional organs. The Brompton Oratory in South Kensington had a Casson Positive, which was used to accompany small services, sung by clergy only. In 1937 it was regarded as unsatisfactory, and was replaced by a harmonium, itself since replaced. A one-manual 8-stop Positive Organ Company instrument was installed in the crypt of St Paul's Cathedral in London in 1900, to commemorate Queen Victoria's 80th birthday the year before. Subsequently, for some years it was the organ in the Lady Chapel at St Edmundsbury Cathedral in Bury St Edmunds, Suffolk. The Positive Organ Company provided a one-manual 8-stop instrument for use by Westminster Cathedral in 1902 (and possibly another in 1907, details of which are otherwise lost). The 1902 instrument has had a long and varied service, used as recently as 1994, but is no longer playable. It is located in a gallery in the Vaughan Chantry above the north transept.

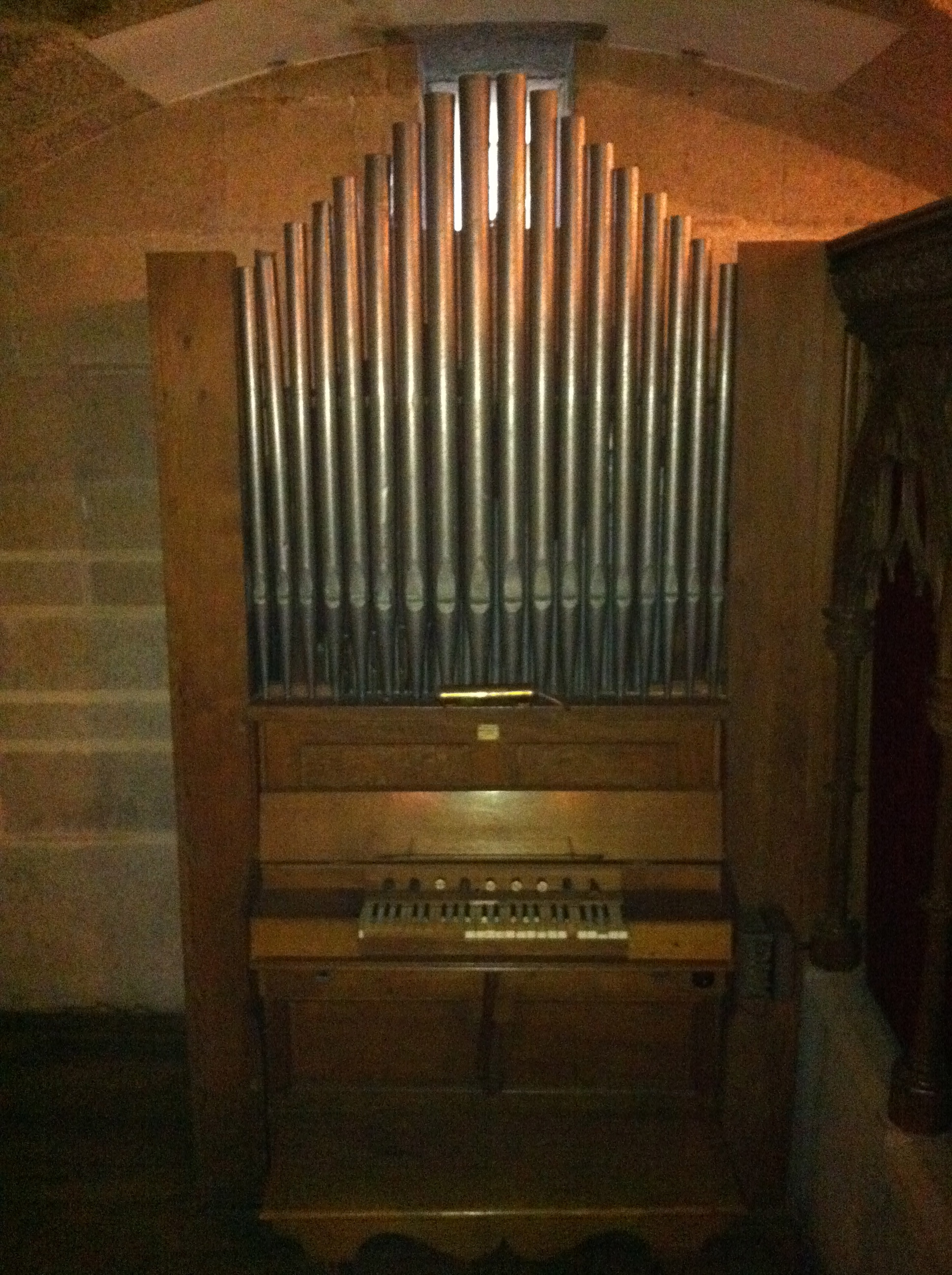
The Positive Organ Company organ at Castle Drogo

They were also well-suited to private homes. An extant, although unplayable, example is the undated Positive Organ Company instrument installed in 1931 in the chapel at Castle Drogo in Devon (now in the care of the National Trust). Another Positive Organ Company instrument was previously at the residence of Henry Wykey Prosser in Andover. After Prosser’s death in 1934, it was sold to the Reformed Evangelical Church in Westerlee in the Netherlands. Until 1958 a Positive Organ Company instrument of unknown origin and date was present at the organist Lady Jeans' house in Westhumble in Surrey, but which she then gave to the chapel of ease in the village.

Many Casson Positives can still be found, but the complex pneumatic action meant that the melodic treble and melodic bass stops have often been disconnected. Sometimes Casson rebuilt an earlier organ. An extant example of that is the organ in the chapel at St Michael's Mount in Cornwall, originally built in 1786 by John Avery and installed in 1791; Casson rebuilt it in 1906. A recent loss was the 1896 Casson's Patent organ in the Guild Chapel, Stratford-upon-Avon. It had been rebuilt by Nicholson & Co Ltd in 1955, but was replaced in 2014 by a three-manual organ built by Principal Pipe Organs: only the pedal Bourdon 16 and Open Diapason 16 were retained from the Casson.

Not all of the organs built by Casson were small; generally these are attributed to his own hand rather than to the Positive Organ Company (because such organs were not 'positive organs'). In 1902 Casson installed a 46-stop organ into William Raeburn Andrew's home at Cathcart House in South Kensington. The National Pipe Organ Register attributes this to Casson himself rather than to the Positive Organ Co. Other extant examples of large organs by Casson include an early, 1880s, two-manual one at All Saints, Thorpe Malsor, described by the organist Paul Hale as "much the most spectacular nineteenth century organ in any village church". Another early, 1889, example from the Casson's Patent Organ Co era, is at St Mary's Church, Redgrave, Suffolk, (redundant, and in the care of the Churches Conservation Trust). A c 1900 organ, also attributed to Casson rather than to the Positive Organ Company, was at St George's Hotel, Llandudno, but is now located at Bethania Methodist Chapel, Eglwysbach, and is the only two-manual Casson in Wales. A four-manual organ was installed around 1900 in the London Organ School and College of Music later merging in to become part of the London Academy of Music and Dramatic Art (better known as LAMDA). The organ was removed in 1921.

The compact size of the Casson Positives meant that many travelled far afield. The organ at Violinos Music Farm near Ashburton, New Zealand is a composite of two Positive Organ Company instruments. The case (opus 129) was installed in a Presbyterian church in Christchurch at an early but unknown date. The later pipework (opus 949) was installed in a Presbyterian church in Wellington in 1923. Examples in Australia include a 1900 Positive Organ Company instrument at St Luke, Yea, in Victoria, a 1905 instrument at St Andrew, Aberfeldie, also in Victoria (originally installed in a church in Fiji), and Macarthur Anglican School in Sydney. Two cathedrals in Uganda have organs made by the Positive Organ Company: a 1931 instrument in Namirembe Cathedral, which was restored by Peter Wells in 1999, and an instrument of unknown date, acquired in Leeds in 1955 by Rukidi III of Toro, and installed in St John's Cathedral, Kabarole, which is no longer playable.

The Company made a voluntary wind-up resolution in 1922. The Chairman at the time was John Mewburn Levien, Secretary of the Royal Philharmonic Society, 1918-29. The shell company was not struck off the register of companies until 1971. Meanwhile, a new company was established in 1922: The Positive Organ Company (1922) Ltd. Subsequent organs were built by the 1922 company. That 1922 company ceased trading in 1941.
