= Philip Hamond =

British Army officer (1883-1953)

Major Philip Hamond DSO & Bar MC (1 May 1883 – 29 July 1953) was a decorated British Army officer who played a prominent part in the downfall of the Rector of Stiffkey. He later collected Norfolk folk songs.

== Military career ==
He was the eldest son of Charles Annesley and Mary Augusta Hamond, of Twyford Hall, East Dereham. He was commissioned in the 4th (2nd Norfolk Militia) Battalion, Norfolk Regiment, and served in the Second Boer War where he was dangerously wounded at the Battle of Rooiwal in early April 1902. Following the battle, he was mentioned in despatches, and created a Companion of the Distinguished Service Order (DSO), the youngest regular officer - at 18 - to that date to earn a DSO. He was also, on 23 April 1902, awarded a Regular Army commission as a second lieutenant in the Royal Warwickshire Regiment, nominated by the General Officer Commanding-in-Chief, South Africa. The transfer was cancelled, however, when on 7 May 1902 he instead joined a regular battalion of the Norfolk Regiment. Following the end of hostilities, he left Cape Town for England in early June the same year.

He rejoined the Norfolk Regiment in 1914. He was awarded the Military Cross in the 1916 Birthday Honours and (as a major), a second DSO in 1918. He was attached to the Tank Corps, commanding F battalion at the Battle of Cambrai (1917). Late on the morning of 20 November 1917, his battalion of twelve Mark IV tanks entered the town of Masnières. On reaching the St Quentin Canal, it was found that the only bridge had been partially destroyed by the Germans. F22 Flying Fox II was ordered to attempt to cross but the weight of the tank caused the bridge to collapse further. The crew escaped but the tank blocked the progress of other tanks and cavalry units that were attempting to cross the canal in order to exploit the British breakthrough.

=== Served with Dwight D. Eisenhower ===
In 1918 he was sent to the US as British Liaison Officer to teach tank warfare at Camp Colt, Pennsylvania with Major Dwight D. Eisenhower. The second award of the DSO was gazetted 31 May 1918.

== Family ==
On 25 August 1909, he married Rita Gladys Ethel Hammond. They leased Morston Hall in 1914. Between 1924 and 1928, he built Scaldbeck House, Morston almost entirely from reclaimed materials retrieved from local properties; much of the timber for the house came from a French schooner, Guenowle, which had grounded at Blakeney in August 1921.

After Rita's death in 1926, he married Emily Diana Helen Walton (1899-1982) in 1928.

== Rector of Stiffkey affair ==
As a prominent landowner and churchwarden, he clashed with the Rector of Stiffkey-with-Morston, Harold Davidson. In 1930, Davidson missed the Remembrance Day service; Hamond was furious and accused the priest of insulting the war dead. His complaints initiated investigations which led to the Rector's trial on charges of immorality and his eventual defrocking in 1932.

Hamond was convicted of assault in 1932. After his last service at Stiffkey, Davidson had called at Hamond's house, apparently to ask for a church key, but Hamond refused to speak to him and told him "Clear out, or I'll kick you out!". Hamond then kicked the Rector off the step, stating at the Magistrates' court that it was "a kick of finality and contempt". Hamond also kicked a companion of Davidson, Clinton Gray-Fisk. He was convicted of two counts of assault and fined 20 shillings on each plus the court costs. Hamond was a magistrate on the Holt bench where the case was heard. Local legend states that Hamond received many letters from sympathisers paying part of his fine and that one enclosed a packet of hobnails with a request that he put those into the soles of his boots for next time.

He lost his sight in later life. Accompanying himself on the melodeon, he would sing folk songs in a rich Norfolk accent.
