= Theophilus Lowe =

Theophilus Lowe MA (1708–1769) was a Canon of Windsor from 1749 to 1769.

== Family ==
He was born in 1708, the son of a Staffordshire plumber.

== Career ==
Lowe matriculated in 1725 at St John's College, Cambridge, where he graduated with a B.A. in 1729, M.A. in 1732 and was a Fellow from 1733 to 1737.

He was appointed:

- Rector of Morston and Stiffkey, Norfolk 1736–1769
- Rector of St Benet Fink 1764–1769

He was appointed to the fifth stall in St George's Chapel, Windsor Castle in 1748, a position he held until he died in 1768.
