= Harold Davidson =

British priest

- Rector of Stiffkey
- Davidson preaching in 1932
- Church: Church of England
- Diocese: Norwich
- In office: 1906 to 1932

Orders
- Ordination: 1903 (deacon); 1904 (priest)
- Laicized: 21 October 1934

Personal details
- Born: 14 July 1875 Sholing, Hampshire, United Kingdom
- Died: 30 July 1937 (aged 62) Skegness, Lincolnshire, United Kingdom
- Denomination: Anglican
- Spouse: Moyra "Molly" Saurin (m. 1906)
- Children: 4

Harold Francis Davidson (14 July 1875 – 30 July 1937), generally known as the Rector of Stiffkey, was a Church of England priest who in 1932, after a public scandal, was convicted of immorality by a church court and defrocked. Davidson strongly protested his innocence and, to raise funds for his reinstatement campaign, he exhibited himself in a barrel on the Blackpool seafront. He performed in other sideshows of a similar nature, and died in Skegness after being attacked by a lion in whose cage he was appearing in a seaside spectacular.

Before his ordination in 1903, Davidson had a brief career on the London stage as an entertainer. As a young curate he became actively involved with charitable activity among London's poor, an interest he maintained following his appointment in 1906 as rector of the rural Norfolk parish of Stiffkey. After the First World War, in which he served as a naval chaplain, he devoted himself primarily to his London work. Styling himself the "Prostitutes' Padre", his declared mission was the rescue of young girls he considered in danger of falling into vice. In this role he approached and befriended hundreds of girls and, although there was little direct evidence of improper behaviour, Davidson was frequently found in compromising situations. His neglect of his local duties over many years strained relations with his parishioners in Stiffkey; after a formal complaint, the Bishop of Norwich instituted disciplinary proceedings through a consistory court. Davidson's defence was severely compromised by his eccentric conduct, and was damaged beyond repair when the prosecution produced a photograph of him with a near-naked teenage girl.

Davidson's later career as a showman earned him much notoriety but little money. His attempts at legal redress were unsuccessful, despite recognition even in church circles that he had not been fairly treated by the consistory court. After his death the case continued to attract public interest for decades, through fictional, stage and screen versions of the story. His descendants have continued to assert his innocence of any wrongdoing, and later commentators have generally accepted that however unwise and inappropriate his behaviour, his basic motives were genuine and he did not deserve the humiliations he endured.

== Family background and childhood ==
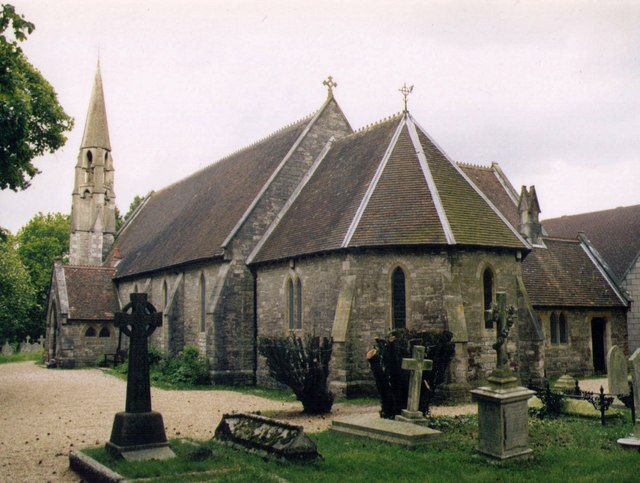
St Mary's Church, in Sholing, Hampshire

Harold Davidson was born on 14 July 1875 in Sholing, near the south coast port of Southampton, to the Reverend Francis Davidson and his wife Alice. Francis Davidson was the vicar of St Mary's, Sholing, a post he had held since 1866; as many as 27 members of the Davidson family were or had been Anglican clergy. Alice Davidson, née Hodgskin, was a great-niece of the educator and Rugby School headmaster Thomas Arnold. Sholing was a poor parish, with a mixed population of dock labourers and itinerant workers, many of whom had little interest in churchgoing. Francis Davidson, described by Harold Davidson's earliest biographer, Tom Cullen, as "a tiny man ... with a luxuriant beard that gave him the appearance of a gnome", served the parish for 48 years. Although he could be pugnacious when necessary, according to a former parishioner he was a true pastor, willing to offer help whatever the circumstances.

Davidson's family assumed that he would follow his father in becoming a priest and he was brought up strictly. When he was six he began attending Banister Court School in Southampton, an establishment founded initially for the sons of Merchant Navy officers. In 1890 Harold was sent to live with two maiden aunts in Croydon while he attended the Whitgift School. Here he became an enthusiastic amateur actor, encouraged by his friendship with a fellow-pupil, Leon Quartermaine, who later won recognition on the stage and in films. In February 1894 the pair appeared together in a school production of the farce Sent to the Tower. Under his aunts' influence, Davidson became a part-time worker at Toynbee Hall, an East End charity founded by Samuel and Henrietta Barnett which attracted many volunteers from schools and universities. Because of these distractions he neglected his school work and failed to win a scholarship that would enable him to attend Oxford University and study for holy orders. In the face of his father's disapproval, he decided to pursue a career as a stage comedian.

== Theatre, Oxford and ordination ==
Davidson's principal theatrical genre was that of the "drawing-room entertainer"; Cullen describes this kind of performance as "An answer to the demand of a rising middle class which was neither cultured nor resourceful, but which wanted desperately to be diverted". Within a few months of leaving Whitgift in 1894, Davidson appeared on the London stage, at Steinway Hall in Lower Seymour Street, performing a comic routine. He was reasonably successful and in the next few years found provincial engagements with Masonic lodges, literary societies and similar social organisations. Cullen suggests that his greatest triumph was as a comic actor in a touring production of Brandon Thomas's popular farce Charley's Aunt. Davidson played the part of Lord Fancourt Babberley, who masquerades as the rich aunt of a fellow-Oxford undergraduate—a frenetic role for which Cullen believes Davidson was eminently suitable.

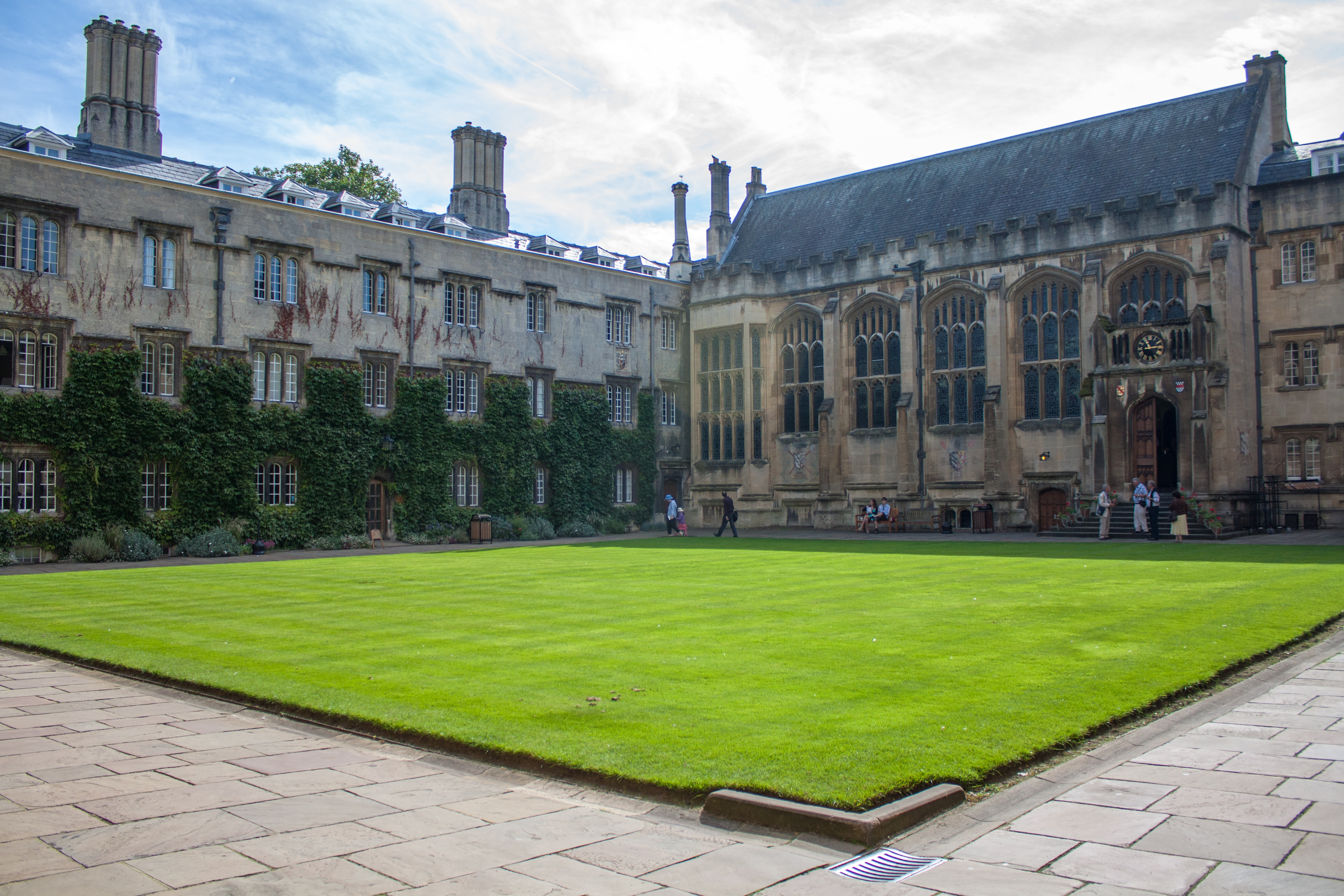
Exeter College, Oxford

During his theatrical days, Davidson maintained high standards of personal morality, observed strict teetotalism and gave regular Bible readings to the elderly in the towns in which he performed on tour. He later gave an account of an incident from November 1894 when he was performing in London. While walking along the Thames Embankment in a thick fog, he said, he encountered a 16-year-old girl who was about to throw herself into the Thames. After preventing her suicide attempt, Davidson learned that she had run away from home near Cambridge, was penniless and without shelter. He paid her fare home: "Her pitiful story made a tremendous impression on me ... I have ever since ... kept my eyes open for opportunities to help that kind of girl."

In 1898 Davidson finally bowed to his father's wish that he should study for holy orders, after the intervention of the Reverend Basil Wilberforce, grandson of the abolitionist William Wilberforce and a friend of the Davidson family. Wilberforce was an alumnus of Exeter College, Oxford, and used his influence to secure Davidson a place there despite the latter's lack of qualifications. At Oxford, Davidson's behaviour was notably eccentric; he displayed considerable energy but disregarded rules, was persistently unpunctual and regularly failed his examinations. He continued to appear on the stage when he could, and decorated the walls of his rooms with autographed pictures of actresses. He once claimed he had left behind a salary of £1000 per year, for a relatively paltry £3 per week as a curate. By 1901 his academic inadequacies were such that he was required to leave Exeter College, although he was allowed to continue studying for his degree at Grindle's Hall, a private hall of the university. He finally passed his examinations in 1903, at the age of 28, and that year was ordained by the Bishop of Oxford—after some reluctance on the part of the bishop to accept so unpromising a candidate.

In 1901, when Annie Horniman's travelling theatrical company visited Oxford, Davidson fell in love with one of the company's leading actresses, Moyra ("Molly") Cassandra Saurin, an attractive blonde and blue-eyed woman from County Meath in Ireland. The couple were quickly engaged, but the relationship was stormy and was several times broken off. There was no question of marriage until Davidson was fully established in his new profession. His first church appointment was a curacy at Holy Trinity Church, Windsor, Berkshire, with an additional role as assistant chaplain to the Household Cavalry at Combermere Barracks. In 1905 he was transferred to London as curate at St Martin-in-the-Fields, where his enthusiasm and industry drew approving comments.

== Rector of Stiffkey ==
=== Early years ===
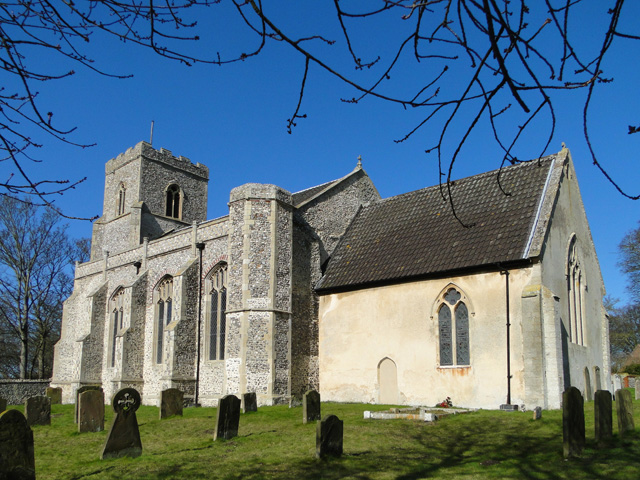
St John and St Mary, Stiffkey, Norfolk

Davidson's appointment in 1906 as rector of the Norfolk parish of Stiffkey with Morston came through the patronage of the 6th Marquess Townshend, whose family had a long history of public and political service in the county. (Note: In the Church of England, every parish has a "patron" responsible for the appointment of incumbent clergy. Traditionally, patrons were often members of the nobility or landed gentry; following late 20th-century legislation, most patronage passed to bishops, other church bodies or the Crown, though some remains in private hands.) The appointment was probably given in recognition of Davidson's role in reconciling the fierce opposition of the Townshend family to the marquess's proposed marriage to Gwladys Sutherst, the daughter of a bankrupt Yorkshire businessman; as curate of St Martin's, Davidson had officiated at the wedding on 8 August 1905. The Stiffkey living was highly desirable, with 60 acres (24 ha) of glebe land, a large Georgian rectory, and an income in 1906 of £503 per annum, rising during Davidson's incumbency to £800. (Note: Thirty years after Davidson's appointment, only about half of the Church of England's 12,000 parishes were worth more than £400 a year to their incumbents, and as late as 1962 many clergy earned no more than £600 a year – less than a bus driver's wages.)

Stiffkey, close to the northern Norfolk coast, lies on both sides of the River Stiffkey, with extensive salt marshes on its seaward side. (Note: Some sources, including Ronald Blythe (1964) and Matthew Parris (1998), maintain that the village name is pronounced "Stewkey". Davidson's principal biographers Cullen (1975) and Tucker (2007) found that the locals pronounced the name as spelt. Cullen records that "Stewkey" refers only to the "Stewkey Blues" cockles, found on the nearby seashore.) At the time of Davidson's arrival in 1906, the village, with a population of around 350, was generally impoverished. Although, according to Davidson's 2007 biographer Jonathan Tucker, the village was well-supplied, and did have a few shops and public houses. Davidson was quickly on good terms with most of the villagers, who referred to him with affection as "Little Jimmy"—he was only 5 feet 3 inches (1.60 metres) tall. He was less well-regarded by the local gentry, including the main landowner, Colonel Groom, who fell out with Davidson after the priest rebuked him for keeping a mistress.

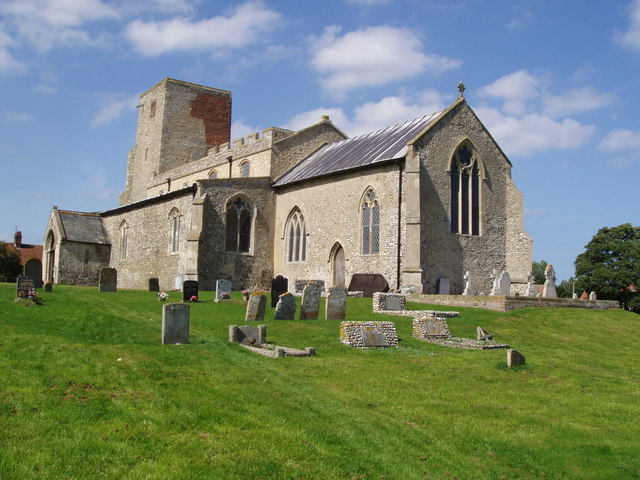
All Saints' Church, Morston, Norfolk

On 9 October 1906, now settled into a prosperous living, Davidson married Molly Saurin. The Stiffkey rectory became a family home, as children were born at regular intervals. (Note: The first child, a daughter, was born in 1907, followed by a son in 1909, another daughter in 1911 and another son in 1913. Cullen records that as they grew older they were mainly educated away from home, and were not much exposed to the atmosphere of the Stiffkey rectory.) Notwithstanding his parochial and domestic responsibilities, Davidson quickly adopted the habit of spending much of the week in London, engaged in various kinds of social work. Through his friendship with Reginald Kennedy-Cox, whom he had met at Oxford, Davidson became involved with the Malvern Mission, forerunner of the Dockland Settlements, of which he later became a trustee. (Note: Davidson continued this work for the remainder of his years as rector. His activities in raising funds and soliciting volunteer helpers were noted with approval on a visit to the East End by Queen Mary.) He also became chaplain to the Actors' Church Union, based at St Paul's, Covent Garden, and was frequently to be found backstage in London's theatres, ministering to the needs of showgirls—sometimes with an unwelcomed degree of persistence. Between 1910 and 1913 he expanded this work to Paris, to which he made regular visits, sometimes acting as a chaperone for dancers recruited by the Folies Bergère. Many out-of-work and would-be actresses were invited to stay at the Stiffkey rectory, sometimes as many as 20 at a time, to the consternation of Molly Davidson and of some of the local establishment who feared for the morals of local farmhands. Among those most disapproving of Davidson's conduct was Major Philip Hamond, a churchwarden at Morston, who later became Davidson's principal adversary.

=== First World War ===
Davidson was 39 years old at the outbreak of the First World War in 1914. In October 1915, possibly to escape the increasingly turbulent atmosphere in the Stiffkey rectory, he joined the Royal Navy as a chaplain. He began his service on HMS Gibraltar, a depot ship based in the Shetland Islands, where he irritated his shipmates by calling church parades every time another ship visited the anchorage. However, he had the full approval of the base commander, Vice Admiral Sir Reginald Tupper, who was known as "Holy Reggie". Davidson's service report from Gibraltar's captain records that "he performs his duties in a perfunctory manner. Not on good terms with messmates, disregards mess rules and regulations". In October 1916 Davidson joined HMS Fox in the Middle East, and shortly afterwards was arrested by the naval police during a raid on a Cairo brothel. He explained that he was looking for a diseased prostitute who had been infecting his men. Again his commanding officer's reports were negative; however, Davidson remained with the Fox until August 1918 when he was posted to HMS Leviathan in the northern Atlantic. Here, his commander was slightly more complimentary; he found Davidson "a clever writer and entertainer [who] pays attention to duty". Davidson left the Navy in March 1919.

=== "Prostitutes' Padre" ===
"The Reverend Mr Davidson's downfall ... was girls. Not a girl, not five or six girls even, not a hundred, but the entire tremulous universe of girlhood. Shingled heads, clear cheeky eyes, nifty legs, warm, blunt-fingered workaday hands, small firm breasts and, most importantly, good strong healthy teeth, besotted him."

— Ronald Blythe: The Rector of Stiffkey (1964)

When Davidson returned home he found that Molly was six months pregnant. The dates of his service leave during 1918 made it apparent that he was not the father. A daughter was born on 21 June 1919; the likely father was a Canadian army colonel, Ernest Doudemain, a friend from Davidson's schooldays who had lodged at the rectory in the latter part of 1918. Although deeply upset by his wife's infidelity, Davidson accepted the child—who bore some resemblance to him—as his own. (Note: The daughter, born Pamela Cushla le Poer Davidson, lived until 2001. She always maintained that Doudemain was her real father, though she was fond of Davidson and often stayed with him in Blackpool and Skegness, after his removal from Stiffkey.) To escape the poisoned atmosphere in Stiffkey he applied for a year's posting as chaplain to a hill station at Simla in India, but the opportunity fell through. Instead, Davidson resumed his pre-war routine of spending his weeks in London, departing early on Monday morning and returning late on Saturday. Sometimes, through a missed rail connection or other mishap, he was barely in time for the Sunday morning service at Stiffkey, and sometimes he would fail to arrive at all.

Davidson, perhaps partly driven by his youthful experience of rescuing a girl from suicide at Thames River 25 years earlier, had convinced himself that nearly all young girls alone in London were in need of rescue from a life of vice. Typical of these was Rose Ellis, whom he met in Leicester Square in September 1920. Twenty years old and living precariously from part-time prostitution, she was homeless and had no money. Davidson gave her cash for a room, and arranged to meet her the following week. Thus began a friendship that endured for more than a decade. Davidson brought her to the rectory, where she worked for a time in the gardens. He also tried to get her a job with a touring theatre company, took her to Paris to find employment as an au pair, kept her supplied with small sums of money, and paid her medical bills when she was suffering from venereal disease.

According to his own estimate, Davidson approached around 150 to 200 girls a year over a period of 12 years (he later modified these figures to an overall total of between 500 and 1000). His activities usually centred on the innumerable Lyons, ABC and Express Dairies teashops and their staffs of waitresses. Davidson was mesmerised, says Blythe, by "the ineffable harmonies created by starched linen crackling over young breasts and black-stockinged calves in chubby conference just below the hem of the parlourmaid's frock". Many rejected his advances; a number of teashops considered him a pest and barred him. Landladies took exception to his habit of visiting their female tenants at all hours of the night. Commentators have found little evidence that he behaved indecently, or molested the girls; he bought them tea, found them rooms, listened to their problems and sometimes found them work on the stage or in domestic service. He styled himself the "Prostitutes' Padre", and asserted to his bishop that this was "the proudest title that a true priest of Christ can hold".

=== Financial problems ===
To meet the costs of his lifestyle, Davidson needed more money than his Stiffkey living could provide. He sought to improve his financial position when, in about 1920, he met Arthur John Gordon, supposedly a wealthy American company promoter but in reality an undischarged bankrupt and confidence trickster. Gordon not only persuaded Davidson to invest his savings in a range of dubious schemes, but also got him to solicit funds from other investors. Davidson borrowed heavily to increase his investment and by 1925 was in serious financial difficulties. (Note: Both Tucker and Cullen record that Davidson invested around £5,000 with Gordon, a sum more than six times his gross stipend.) In February that year he failed to pay his local rates and was threatened with imprisonment. He avoided this by borrowing from moneylenders at exorbitant interest rates, but in October was forced to file a petition of bankruptcy with debts totalling £2,924. Eventually a settlement was reached, whereby around half of his Stiffkey stipend was applied to the reduction of his debts. Somehow, however, Davidson managed to continue his London life. He never stopped believing in Gordon's essential honesty, and was certain that one day his investments would pay off. Much of his time in London was spent, not in pursuit of girls, but looking for Gordon.

== Downfall and deposition ==
=== Complaints and investigations ===
"I can earnestly assure you in the sight of God that my conscience is free from any knowledge of breach of the moral law ... or of vice of any form with women or girls ... I believe with all my soul that if [Christ] were born again in London in the present day he would be found constantly walking in Piccadilly"

— Letter from Davidson to the Bishop of Norwich, 9 December 1931.

Although many of Davidson's parishioners accepted that his London rescue mission was entirely honourable, some, including Major Hamond, were less convinced. Hamond was suspicious of the stream of visitors that Davidson brought to the Stiffkey rectory and thought he was neglecting his parochial duties. In 1927 relations between the two men worsened when Davidson, in a letter which Tucker describes as "breathless in its rudeness and insensitivity", upbraided the major for clearing the ground in the Morston churchyard alongside his recently deceased wife's grave: "Morston Churchyard is the private freehold property of the Rector of Morston ... you have no possible right to interfere with it in any way without my permission any more than I have the right to come and annex a part of your garden." On one occasion, Davidson arrived late at Morston to officiate at a communion service, having forgotten the bread and wine; enraged, Hamond ordered him back to the rectory to collect it. An even greater lapse, in Hamond's eyes, was Davidson's failure to return to Stiffkey in time to officiate at the 1930 Armistice Day ceremony at the local war memorial.

Early in 1931, advised by a cousin who was a priest, Hamond made a formal complaint against Davidson to the Bishop of Norwich, the Right Reverend Bertram Pollock, citing the rector's supposed behaviour with women in London. Under the provisions of the Clergy Discipline Act 1892, members of the clergy could be prosecuted in a consistory court for "immoral acts" and, if convicted, face punishments ranging from temporary suspension to full deposition—"defrocking"—from holy orders. Pollock was initially reluctant to prosecute Davidson, but was advised by his legal counsel Henry Dashwood that the case should proceed. In search of evidence, Dashwood hired a private enquiry agent, who soon found Rose Ellis and persuaded her to sign a statement detailing her ten-year association with Davidson. The statement—which was immediately retracted by Ellis and never presented in court—contained little indication of any intimate relationship other than that she had once lanced a boil on Davidson's bottom.

Enquiries continued for many months. The bishop was initially reluctant to pursue the case—Davidson thought he might be prepared to replace the charges with a lesser one of indiscipline. In February 1932 Dashwood advised Pollock that the matter could not be suppressed in this way; allegations had been printed in the Evening News on 1 February, and the story had been picked up by other papers whose lurid headlines had created much public interest. On 7 February the bishop received a letter from a 17-year-old girl, Barbara Harris, which contained specific allegations of immoral conduct against Davidson and promised more: "I know lots of things against him that might help you ... He has the keys of a lot of girls' flats and front doors." This letter is described by Matthew Parris in his account of the case as "a masterpiece of vituperation"; Davidson's lawyers failed to identify some obvious differences between the handwriting in the letter and other examples of Harris's writing, a factor which might have affected the impact of her subsequent testimony to the court.

=== Consistory court hearing ===
A consistory court was convened for 29 March 1932, under the presidency of the Norwich diocesan chancellor, F. Keppel North. Davidson was accused of associating with "women of loose character", and "accosting, molesting, and importuning young females for immoral purposes". The prosecution's case was in the hands of a high-profile legal team, headed by Roland Oliver KC and including the future cabinet minister Walter Monckton. Davidson, meanwhile, engaged experienced lawyers to defend him, funding this partly through the sale of newspaper stories. Because of the level of press interest, and the number of London-based witnesses involved, the court sat in Church House, Westminster, rather than in Norwich.

This photograph of Davidson with Estelle Douglas, taken on 28 March 1932, was critical evidence that led to his conviction by the Consistory Court.

After Oliver provided a summary account of Davidson's life in London, Barbara Harris gave evidence. Cullen likens her evidence to "a whip of scorpions" that Davidson took full in the face. Davidson had first met Harris in September 1930, when she was 16. He had used a favoured ploy—affecting to confuse her with a well-known film actress—to persuade her to take a meal with him. He then began regular visits to her lodgings, gave her small sums of money and promised to find her work. From time to time he shared rooms with her: "At first he kept to the chair", Harris wrote, "but after the first few nights he did not". In her evidence to the court she said she had not had intercourse with Davidson, though he had attempted this on several occasions; when she had repulsed his advances, she claimed that he had "relieved himself".

Other aspects of the odd relationship were revealed during Harris' lengthy examination and cross-examination: her visit to the Stiffkey rectory where she had been made to work as an unpaid kitchenmaid and given only a chair to sleep in; Davidson's repeated promises to divorce his wife and marry Harris; an incident when she and another girl, the latter in a nightgown, had danced in front of Davidson, supposedly so that he could judge their dancing abilities. The picture that Harris' letter and evidence presented, if true, Tucker says, was that of "a man who is out of control ... running around London entertaining teenage girls ... adopting the guise of a kindly priest to ingratiate himself".

Harris was followed into the witness-box by a succession of landladies, waitresses and other women, all of whom confirmed Davidson's habitual pestering without making any serious accusation of misconduct. When Davidson himself took to the stand, on 25 May, his light-hearted, even flippant, manner created, says Tucker, "the flavour of a comedy routine with the rector's counsel as straight man". Davidson's disastrous finances were aired—he took great offence when his association with Gordon was presented as a "partnership in crime". He caused disbelief and amusement in the court when, questioned about the boil-lancing incident with Rose Ellis, he professed not to know what a "buttock" was, claiming: "It is a phrase I have honestly never heard. So far as I remember it is a little below the waist." At this stage, only Harris's largely uncorroborated testimony had provided specific allegations of immorality; the rest of the evidence was inconclusive and it seemed that the prosecution might fail. Davidson's cause was severely damaged, however, when Oliver produced a photograph of him, taken on 28 March 1932, with a nearly naked girl. She was Estelle Douglas, the 15-year-old daughter of one of Davidson's oldest friends. Davidson explained that the picture had been intended as a publicity shot to help the girl find work as an actress. He protested that he had been set up, and did not know she was naked under her shawl; he thought she was wearing a bathing suit, as she had been in an earlier photograph. On 6 June, after closing speeches from both sides, the court adjourned until 8 July to allow the chancellor, who alone would determine the outcome, to consider the evidence.

=== Verdict, sentence, defrocking ===
During the court proceedings Davidson continued to officiate at Stiffkey and Morston, although his erratic attendance meant that substitutes often had to be arranged. On 12 June 1932 the Reverend Richard Cattell arrived to officiate at the evening service in Stiffkey. He had just begun when Davidson entered the church and attempted to seize the Bible. The two priests wrestled with the book for some seconds before Cattell yielded, telling the congregation: "As nothing short of force will prevent Mr Davidson from taking part, I can see nothing left to do but to withdraw." The crowds of reporters and sightseers at weekends led the Archdeacon of Lynn to issue a statement deploring the "media circus" and asking that "the full spirit of worship" be restored to Sunday services.

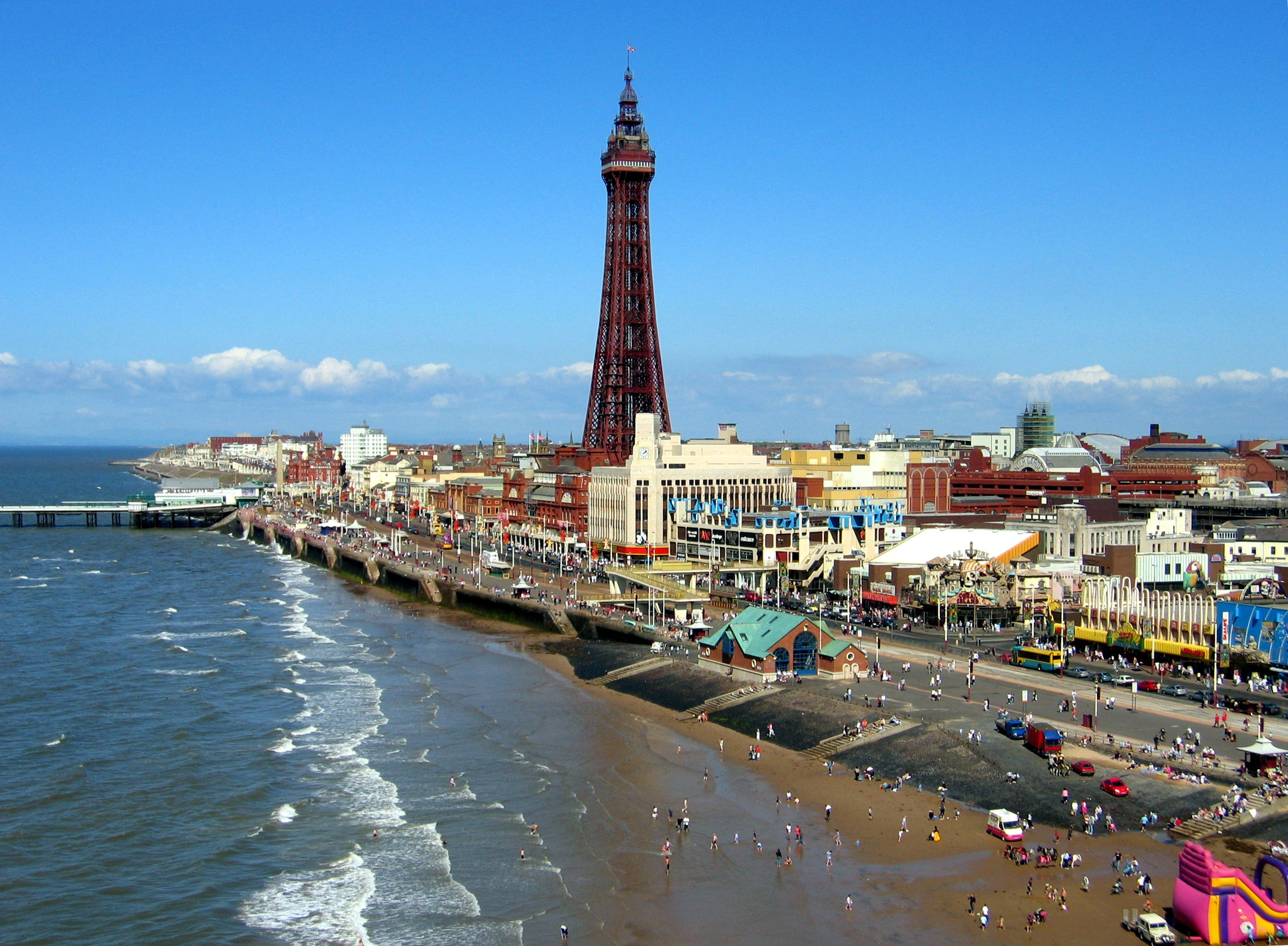
Blackpool's "Golden Mile", with the 1894 Blackpool Tower prominent

On 8 July 1932 Keppel North announced his verdict; Davidson was guilty on five counts of immorality. The sentence would be determined by the bishop; in the meantime, Davidson was entitled to seek leave to appeal to the Privy Council. Sorely in need of funds to meet his continuing legal expenses, Davidson reverted to his early career as a stage entertainer. On 18 July he made his debut with a variety act at the Prince's Cinema in Wimbledon and later toured in the provinces until, possibly dissuaded by pressure from church authorities, theatres declined to book him. He then continued his public performances by appearing in a barrel on the Blackpool sea front, or "Golden Mile", where thousands paid to observe him through a small window. Not everyone was impressed; one customer, recalling the event years later, said: "He was very tatty and the place stank." He shared his seafront billing with, among other attractions, "Mariana the Gorilla Girl", the "Bearded Lady from Russia" and Dick Harrow, "the world's fattest man".

To the consternation of Hamond and some other parishioners, the bishop delayed issuing an instruction forbidding Davidson to preach. When Hamond locked Morston church against him, the rector preached to a large congregation on the grass outside the church. In August, Davidson's licence to minister as a priest was revoked; his last service was morning worship at Stiffkey on 21 August 1932, when around 1,000 people congregated outside the church. That afternoon he demanded the Morston church keys from Hamond, who sent him away by turning him round and administering a substantial kick. Hamond was later fined for this assault.

In July and again in October, Davidson was refused leave to appeal to the Privy Council on grounds of either fact or law. The consistory court reconvened for sentencing in Norwich Cathedral on 21 October. Davidson was allowed briefly to address the court; he admitted that his behaviour had been indiscreet, but regretted none of his actions and proclaimed his innocence "of any of the graver charges that have been made against me". Then, in what Blythe describes as a "horrible little ceremony", Bishop Pollock delivered the most severe sentence available—that of deposition: "Now therefore we, Bertram ... do thereby pronounce decree and declare that the said Reverend Harold Francis Davidson being a priest and deacon ought to be entirely removed, deposed and degraded from the said offices." Davidson was thus defrocked. As the ceremony ended he made a furious impromptu speech, denouncing the sentence and declaring his intention to appeal to the Archbishop of Canterbury, Cosmo Gordon Lang.

== Campaigning for reinstatement, death by lion ==
=== Blackpool showman ===
"The campaign to clear his name, very real at first, declined with gimmicky tricks until it became an outré side-show in which goggle-eyed holidaymakers would cram themselves to see a real live Sunday newspaper sensation."

— Ronald Blythe, The Rector of Stiffkey (1964)

The consistory court had awarded the prosecution's costs against Davidson, who now faced enormous legal bills and had no regular source of income. His only recourse was to return to Blackpool and resume his career as a showman; this became his milieu for the next four years, interrupted by occasional prosecutions for obstruction and a nine-day spell in prison in 1933, for non-payment of rent owing to one of his former London landladies. He informed the press: "While I am in the barrel I shall be occupied in preparing my case". Although the barrel act remained his staple performance, he introduced variations over the years: freezing in a refrigerated chamber, or being roasted in a glass-fronted oven while a mechanised devil prodded him with a pitchfork. In August 1935 the freezing routine led to Davidson's arrest and prosecution for attempted suicide; he won the case and was awarded £382 damages for false imprisonment. How much money Davidson made from his various acts is uncertain; Tucker believes that the main financial beneficiary was his agent, Luke Gannon.

Molly Davidson had managed to acquire a small house in South Harrow, where Davidson spent his winters. Off-season he worked sporadically, at one time as a door-to-door book salesman, and on another as a porter at St Pancras railway station. He could not avoid press attention; in November 1936 he was arrested and fined for pestering two 16-year-old girls at Victoria station—he had approached them offering auditions for a leading role in a West End show. That same month he interrupted a Church Assembly at Central Hall, Westminster, at which the Archbishop of Canterbury was present. Davidson was prevented from addressing the meeting, at which he dropped numerous copies of a mimeographed pamphlet titled "I Accuse", in which he listed his grievances and castigated the Church's hierarchy.

=== Death in Skegness ===
The seafront at Skegness (2006 photograph), showing the Skegness Amusement Park in the left-hand background

By 1937 interest in Davidson's Blackpool sideshows was waning and, for that summer, he accepted an invitation to join the self-styled "Captain" Fred Rye's animal-themed show in the east coast resort of Skegness. He considered this a step upwards from what he termed "the blatant vulgarities of Blackpool". Davidson's act consisted of a 10-minute address delivered outside a cage containing two lions, after which he would enter the cage and spend a few minutes with the lions. This required courage on Davidson's part, because he was fearful of animals. A 16-year-old tamer, Irene Somner, supervised proceedings. The act was billed as "Daniel in a modern lion's den", and attracted large audiences, including a significant number of clergy.

On 28 July 1937, at the evening performance, Davidson gave his usual speech before entering the cage in which two lions, Freddie and Toto, were sitting quietly. Then, according to Blythe: "in scarcely credible terms, the little clergyman from Norfolk and the lion acted out the classical Christian martyrdom to the full". Eyewitnesses later reported that after Davidson had cracked his whip and shouted, Freddie became agitated and knocked Davidson over, before seizing him by the neck and running with him around the cage. Somner struggled to pacify the snarling Freddie, who eventually dropped the unconscious Davidson, enabling her to drag him to safety; he was badly gashed, and had suffered a broken bone in his neck. An uncorroborated story circulated that while waiting for the ambulance, Davidson asked that the London newspapers be alerted in time for next day's first editions. According to some press reports he sat up in hospital and asked visitors for their impressions of his ordeal in the cage. Most historians of the affair, however, believe that Davidson never recovered consciousness. He died on 30 July, his death possibly hastened by an insulin injection administered by a doctor who believed that Davidson was a diabetic. The coroner's verdict was death by misadventure.

Friends and well-wishers covered the expenses of the funeral, which took place on 3 August in Stiffkey churchyard. A large crowd—around 3,000 according to Tucker—was in attendance including, from Davidson's distant past, the Marchioness Townshend. Onlookers unable to get into the churchyard found vantage points on nearby walls, roofs and in trees. When the headstone was put in place it contained a line from Robert Louis Stevenson: "For on faith in man and genuine love of man all searching after truth must be founded."

== Aftermath and appraisal ==
"We have no hesitation in saying that the conduct of the case by the Bishop's legal advisers was tragically ill-advised ... A Consistory Court is still, in the eyes of the law, a Court Christian. We might at least have expected in it a higher tone than we get in secular courts. We did not find it ... the spirit in which [the proceedings] were conducted has shocked the public conscience."

— From the Church Times, 15 July 1932, quoted in Tucker, p. 115.

In Skegness, Rye saw Davidson's death as a business opportunity; crowds flocked to see "The Actual Lion that Mauled and Caused the Death of the Ex-Rector of Stiffkey". By contrast, Molly Davidson's financial situation was desperate. When her family applied to the church authorities for help, Archbishop Lang acted on her behalf behind the scenes and eventually she received grants from two church charities. She died in a Dulwich nursing home in 1955. Of the other major participants in the legal case, Pollock remained as Bishop of Norwich until his resignation in 1942, a year before his death. Davidson's girls—Rose Ellis, Barbara Harris, Estelle Douglas and the rest—disappeared from public view after the 1932 trial, although a 1934 letter from Davidson indicates that Harris was then working at the London store Selfridges, under the name "Babs Simpson". When announcing a 2010 book about the war artist Leslie Cole, The Fleece Press revealed that Harris had married Cole after changing her name and had thereafter successfully concealed her true identity from all enquirers. Even her husband may not have known of her past. (Note: Book details: Yorke, Malcolm (2010). "Today I worked well – the picture fell off the brush". The artistry of Leslie Cole. Huddersfield: The Fleece Press. ISBN 978-0-948375-90-3.)

After Davidson's death and burial, press attention withered as newspapers concentrated on more significant events in the years before the Second World War. In the decades after the war interest in the affair was periodically revived. In 1963 Blythe, deemed by Parris to be the affair's "best historian", published his account. Later in the 1960s, two stage musical versions were produced: The Stiffkey Scandals of 1932, which appeared in Edinburgh in 1967 and London in 1968, and God Made the Little Red Apple, staged in Manchester in 1969. Neither of these productions was commercially successful; when the former was adapted for television, The Daily Telegraph's critic questioned the artistic justification for a musical about "so sad and peculiar a person". In the 1970s Davidson's case was the subject of a radio documentary, A Proper Little Gent, and in 1994 an episode of BBC Television's Matter of Fact series examined the affair. Cullen's full-length biography of Davidson in 1975 posits a theory that multiple personalities led him to behave in different ways in differing circumstances. Robert Brown, in a biographical sketch for the Oxford Dictionary of National Biography, suggests that what really motivated Davidson will never be known. In 2001 Ken Russell made a short film inspired by his life The Lion's Mouth.

In 2007 John Walsh published a fictionalised account of Davidson's life, Sunday at the Cross Bones (Fourth Estate), in which, according to a review in The Guardian, Davidson is depicted as "well-meaning but ineffectual, bewildered by the world's wickedness and his own barely acknowledged desires".

The question of Davidson's treatment by the consistory court was first raised by the Church Times immediately after the trial. A leading article argued that, although Davidson's conduct had been "foolish and eccentric", his intentions at least at the start of his ministry had been guided by idealism. Chancellor North was criticised both for lacking compassion and for the general conduct of the proceedings: "No experienced criminal solicitor could conceivably have blundered so badly and consistently." In 2006 Davidson's granddaughter, Karylin Collier, privately published a brief biography, The Rector of Stiffkey: His Life and Trial, in which she repudiates all the charges against him. Tucker argues that "Harold Davidson probably deserved to be quietly defrocked for his shortcomings as a priest", but nevertheless believes that he was not an immoral man. He also highlights the incompetent presentation of Davidson's case by his legal team, particularly their failure to question the provenance of the Barbara Harris letter. Tucker concludes that since the proceedings were flawed and the evidence of immorality flimsy, the Church of England owes it to the Davidson family to re-examine the original findings.

The writer-historian A. N. Wilson summarises Davidson as a "Tragic buffoon cum Christian Martyr". In his history of Britain in the inter-war years, A. J. P. Taylor writes that "Davidson offered a parable of the age. He attracted more attention than, say, Cosmo Gordon Lang, archbishop of Canterbury. Which man deserves a greater place in the history books?"

== Notes and references ==
=== Bibliography ===
- Blythe, Ronald (1964). The Age of Illusion: England in the Twenties and Thirties, 1919–1940 (Ch. 8: "The Rector of Stiffkey"). Harmondsworth, UK: Penguin Books. OCLC 10971329.
- Cullen, Tom (1975). The Prostitutes' Padre: The Story of the Notorious Rector of Stiffkey. London: The Bodley Head. ISBN 0-370-10285-1.
- Lyall, Ian (2007). Explore the North Norfolk Coast. London: Lulu Enterprises. ISBN 978-1-84753-681-5.
- Parris, Matthew (1999). The Great Unfrocked ( Ch. "Harold Davidson, Rector of Stiffkey", pp. 47–64). London: Robson Books. ISBN 1-86105-263-4.
- Taylor, A. J. P. (1970). English History 1914–45. Harmondsworth, UK: Penguin Books. ISBN 0-14-021181-0.
- Tucker, Jonathan (2007). The Troublesome Priest. Norwich: Michael Russell. ISBN 978-0-85955-307-0.
- Wilson, A. N. (2006). After the Victorians. London: Arrow Books. ISBN 978-0-09-945187-7.
