= St John and St Mary, Stiffkey =

Parish church in Norfolk

Coordinates: 52°56′53″N 0°56′16″E

St John the Baptist and St Mary's Church is the parish church of Stiffkey in the English county of Norfolk. It is dedicated to St John the Baptist and the Virgin Mary; the double dedication is the result of, historically, there being two churches in the churchyard. St Mary's was deconsecrated in 1563, and abandoned; St John's then being renamed. The church is best known for its association with Harold Davidson, the Rector of Stiffkey who was defrocked in 1932 and subsequently killed by a lion in Skegness.

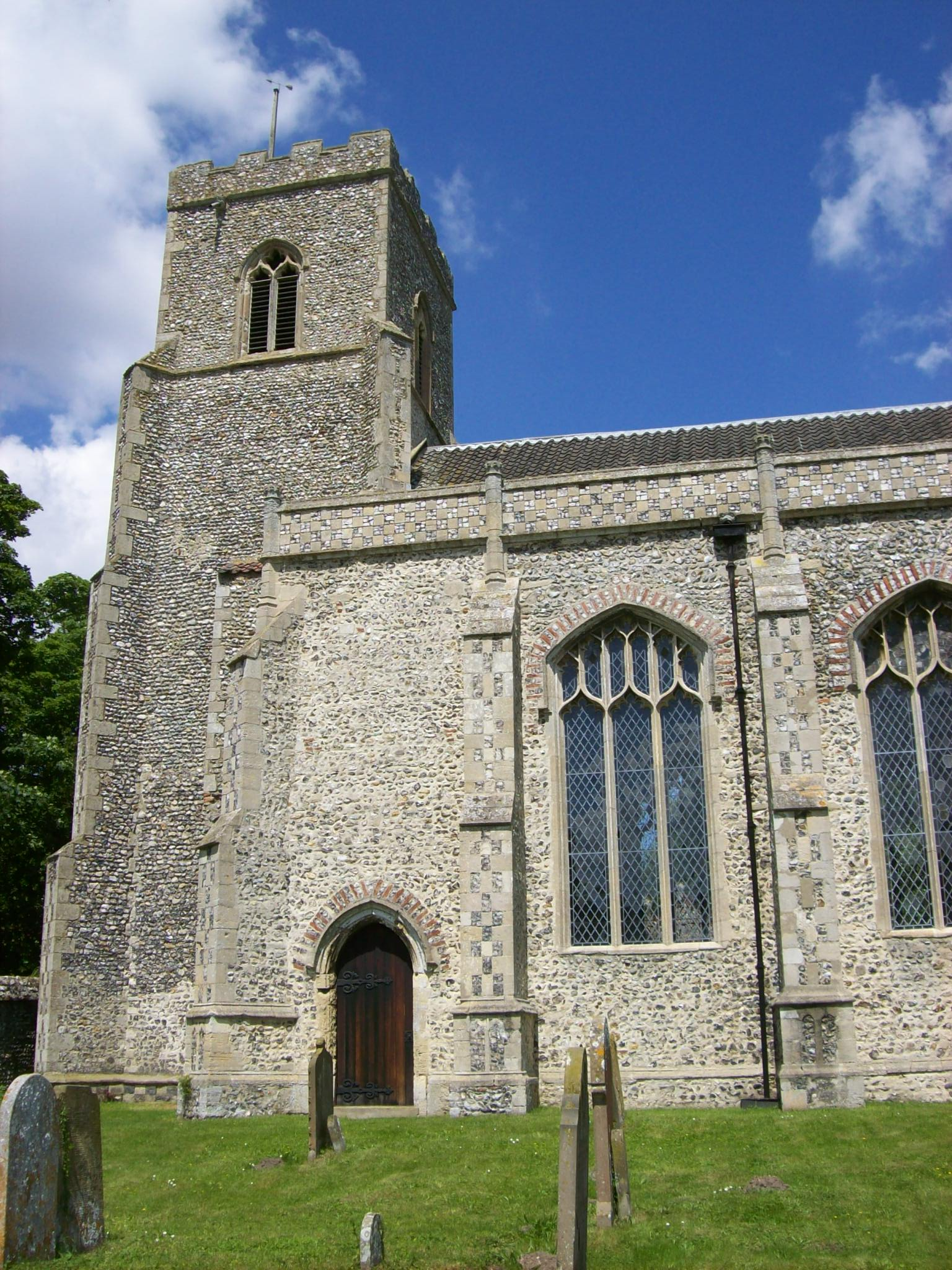
Church tower

== Structure ==
The church is largely perpendicular, but the west tower and charnel are earlier. There is a 4-bay perpendicular nave, with flushwork parapet. The chancel is late 13th or early 14th-century. There are surviving rood stairs on the south side of the nave. There is a wall monument to Nathaniel Bacon, dating from before 1615, possibly by Maximilian Colt. The church is Grade I listed.

The war memorial is a wall tablet, depicting Calvary, and commissioned by Davidson.

The organ was built by the Positive Organ Company. The organs built by the Positive Organ Company were generally small, one-manual instruments, designed to be mobile and well-suited for small churches. They were, however, undated: the company traded from 1898 to 1941, which provides some parameters to its date. The organ was rebuilt in 1954, by Williamson & Hyatt of Trunch in Norfolk.

== Benefice ==
In 1769 the parish of Stiffkey was consolidated with All Saints, Morston. In 1972 it was consolidated with St Andrew and St Mary, Langham Episcopi. It was further consolidated in 1976, with All Saints Cockthorpe (now redundant, and in the care of Norfolk Churches Trust) and Binham Priory. It was consolidated again in 2003, with St Mary, Gunthorpe, All Saints, Bale, St Andrew, Field Dalling, St Margaret, Saxlingham and All Saints, Sharrington, to now form the Benefice of Stiffkey (St John and St Mary) and Bale.

== Notable clergy ==
The church is best known for Harold Davidson (1875-1937), Rector 1906–32. Born to an ecclesiastical family, Davidson initially pursued a career as a stage comedian. Nevertheless, he then attended Exeter College, Oxford, and was ordained in 1903. He was appointed to the living of Stiffkey with Morston in 1906. Davidson was obsessed with the idea of rescuing 'fallen girls' (i.e. prostitutes), and spent his week, from Monday to Saturday, in London, ministering to young girls. His conduct in doing so resulted in him falling out with the churchwarden at Morston. In turn, this led to a complaint to the Bishop of Norwich, and a hearing in a consistory court in 1932. The court's verdict was that Davidson was guilty of five counts of immorality; as a result, the bishop defrocked him. Davidson returned to a career as a stage entertainer, initially at Blackpool, and then, eventually, in Skegness. It was in Skegness that he performed a Daniel in the lions' den routine with an elderly, toothless lion. Attacked by the lion, he died of his injuries. He was buried in the churchyard at Stiffkey; the inscription on his grave describes him as 'Priest'.

Other clergy of note include:

- Theophilus Lowe, Rector 1736–69, who, in plurality, was a Canon of Windsor, 1749–69.
- Lord Frederick Townshend, Rector 1792–1836. Lord Frederick was a younger son of Field Marshal George Townshend, 1st Marquess Townshend. He was ordained as both deacon and priest in 1792, and, upon the latter, immediately appointed to the living of Stiffkey with Morston. Another younger son, Lord Charles Townshend, was elected MP for Yarmouth on 25 May 1796. Lord Frederick attended the declaration with his brother; they then raced to London in a 'carriage and four'. On arrival in London on 27 May, Lord Charles's body was discovered in the coach, having been shot, and Lord Frederick was arrested for his murder. Lord Frederick was judged to be insane, and from 1806 spent the rest of his life at Hadham Palace, the former country home of the Bishops of London in Much Hadham, which was then a lunatic asylum. He died in 1836 and was buried in the churchyard of St Andrew, Much Hadham. Until his death, however, he remained Rector of Stiffkey. Services were taken by curates.
- George Townshend Hudson, Rector 1842–45. Hudson was the nephew of Charlotte Osborne, Duchess of Leeds, the wife of the 6th Duke of Leeds, as well as his predecessor, the insane Lord Frederick Townshend. Sir James Hudson, ambassador to Piedmont-Sardinia in Turin between 1852 and 1863, was Hudson's brother.
- Charles Harold Fitch, Rector 1932–42. Fitch was the voice of Norfolk on a series on dialect by the British Drama League.
- Victor Thomas South Jagg, Rector 1946–55. Jagg was awarded the Military Cross, 1919.
- Cecil Howard Dunstan Cullingford, Rector 1968–71. Cullingford was Headmaster of Monmouth School, 1946–56. He was also a noted speleologist, and the author of a number of books on the subject: Exploring Caves (1950: Compass Books), British Caving (1953: Routledge and Kegan Paul), A Manual of Caving Techniques (1969: Routledge & Kegan Paul), Caving (1976: Thornhill Press), and (with Trevor Ford) The Science of Speleology (1976; The Academic Press).

== Churchyard ==
Notable burials include:

- Aubrey Buxton, Baron Buxton of Alsa (1918-2009), and his first wife, Pamela (1922-83).
- Harold Davidson (1875-1937), Rector of Stiffkey 1906–32.
- Eugene Sweny (1837-1906), Rector 1883–1906. The monument is a large stone Celtic cross.
