= Forest Side (restaurant) =

Restaurant in Grasmere, England

- Interactive map of Forest Side

Restaurant information
- Head chef: Paul Leonard
- Food type: Modern British
- Rating: Michelin star AA Rosettes (2026)
- Location: Keswick Road, Grasmere, LA22 9RN, United Kingdom
- Coordinates: 54°27′50.3″N 3°0′56.9″W
- Website: theforestside.com

Forest Side is a Michelin-starred restaurant in Grasmere, in the United Kingdom. It serves modern British cuisine.

== See also ==
- List of British restaurants
- List of Michelin-starred restaurants in England
