= Galton Blackiston =

English chef

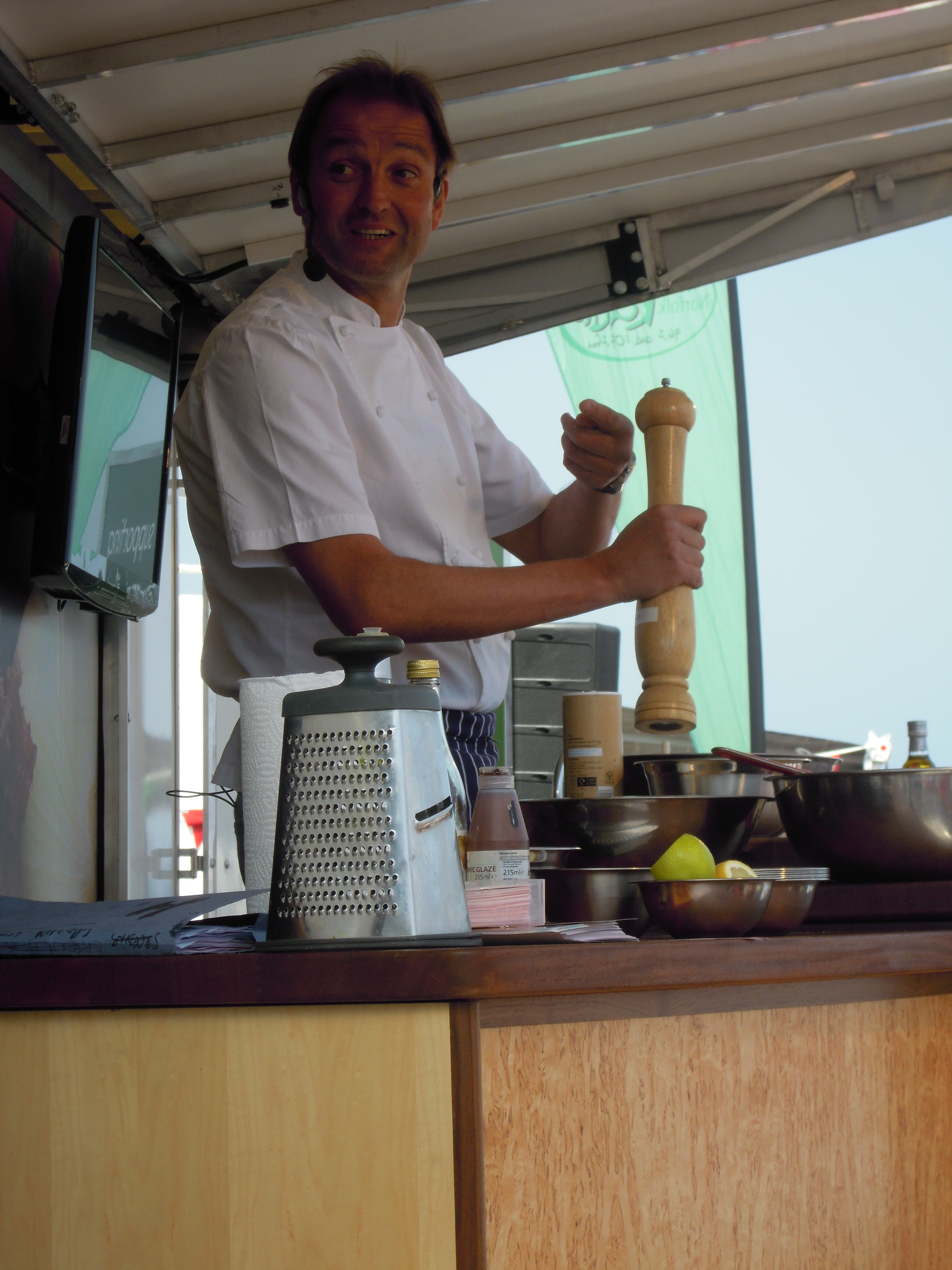
- Galton Blackiston in May 2010
- Born: 13 August 1962 (age 64); Norfolk, England
- Education: Hainford School Norfolk
- Culinary career
- Current restaurant
- No.1 Cromer
- Previous restaurant
- Morston Hall
- Television shows
- Saturday Kitchen; 10 Mile Menu; Great British Menu
- Awardss
- Chef of the Year; Good Hotel Guide; Hotel of Year
- Website: http://www.galtonblackiston.co.uk/

Galton Blackiston is an English chef, born in Norfolk. The restaurant of his hotel, Morston Hall in Morston, is Michelin starred and has 4 AA Rosettes. It is on the north Norfolk coast, two miles from Blakeney.

Blackiston has never trained formally as a chef. After leaving school at 16 to play cricket, he was encouraged by his mother to set up a market stall selling homemade baked goods, "Galton's Goodies". His first job in a restaurant was at John Tovey's Miller Howe country hotel in Windermere, the Lake District.

In 2013, Blackiston opened No 1 Cromer, a fish and chip shop in Cromer.

In 2025, Blackiston and his wife Tracy sold Morston Hall to the hotelier Henry Elworthy, and no longer have any involvement with its running.

== Television ==
Blackiston represented the Midlands and East of England in the BBC's Great British Menu, knocking out celebrity chef Antony Worrall Thompson to gain a place in the final. In 2007, he appeared on the television programme Food Poker. He has also appeared on Put Your Money Where Your Mouth Is, Country Show Cook Off, and Saturday Kitchen.

== Personal life ==
Blackiston supports Norwich City F.C.

== Bibliography ==
Blackiston has published four books on cookery, with the fourth arriving in October 2017.

- Blackiston, Galton (2002). Cooking at Morston Hall. Navigator Guides. ISBN 1-903872-04-9.
- Blackiston, Galton (2006). A Return to Real Cooking. Navigator Guides. ISBN 1-903872-19-7.
- Blackiston, Galton (2009). Summertime. Virgin Books. ISBN 978-1-905264-63-6.
- Blackiston, Galton (2017). Hook Line and Sinker: A Seafood Cook Book. Face. ISBN 978-0-955893-05-6.
