= Cedar Tree (restaurant) =

- Interactive map of Cedar Tree

Restaurant information
- Head chef: Hrishikesh Desai
- Dress code: Smart casual
- Rating: 1 Michelin star
- Location: Hallbankgate, Brampton, United Kingdom
- Coordinates: 54°56′3″N 2°40′22″W
- Website: farlamhall.com

Cedar Tree is a Michelin-starred restaurant in Brampton's Farlam Hall Hotel, in the United Kingdom.

== See also ==
- List of Michelin-starred restaurants in England
