= George Townshend, 7th Marquess Townshend =

British Marquess (1916-2010)

The Most Honourable The Marquess Townshend
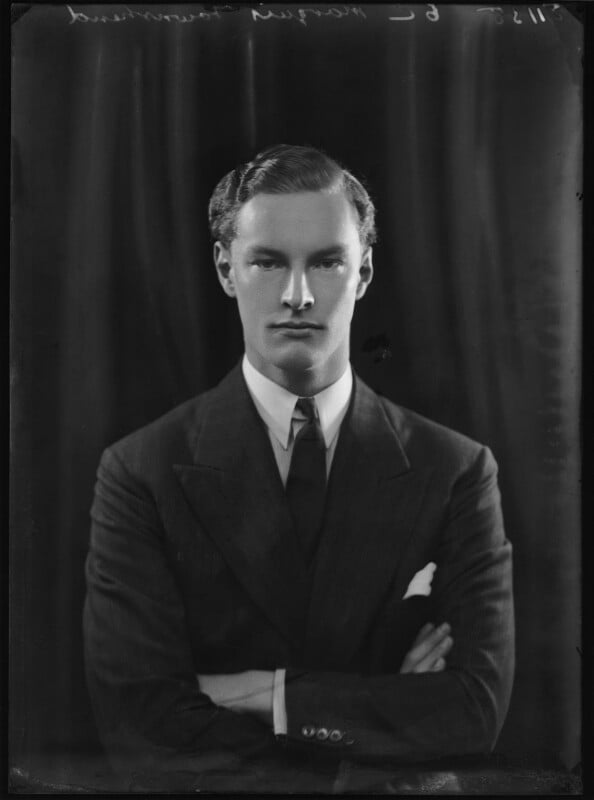
- Townshend in 1936

Member of the House of Lords
- Lord Temporal
- In office 17 November 1921 (Note: He took his seat on 21 October 1937.) – 11 November 1999 as a hereditary peer
- Preceded by: The 6th Marquess Townshend
- Succeeded by: Seat abolished (Note: Pursuant to the House of Lords Act 1999.)

Personal details
- Born: George John Patrick Dominic Townshend; 13 May 1916
- Died: 23 April 2010 (aged 93)
- Party: Conservative
- Spouses: Elizabeth Ludy (m. 1939; div. 1960) Ann Darlow (m. 1960; died 1988) Philippa Swire (m. 2004)
- Children: 5, including Charles Townshend, 8th Marquess Townshend
- Parents: John Townshend, 6th Marquess Townshend; Gwladys Sutherst
- Education: Harrow School

Military service
- Allegiance: United Kingdom
- Branch/service: Territorial Army; British Army
- Years of service: 1936–1945
- Unit: Norfolk Yeomanry; Scots Guards
- Battles/wars: Second World War

George John Patrick Dominic Townshend, 7th Marquess Townshend (13 May 1916 – 23 April 2010), styled Viscount Raynham until 1921, was a British peer and businessman.

== Background ==
Townshend was the only son of John Townshend, 6th Marquess Townshend, and Gwladys Ethel Gwendolen Eugenie Sutherst. His education was at Harrow School, where he contracted a near-fatal case of septicaemia caused by a cricket injury.

Having held his titles since the death of his father in 1921, as of 2 March 2009 Lord Townshend had held a peerage longer than any other peer in history, having passed the previous mark of 87 years, 104 days, held by Charles St Clair, 13th Lord Sinclair (b. 30 July 1768, succeeded 16 December 1775, d. 30 March 1863).

As a hereditary peer, Lord Townshend was entitled to sit and vote in the House of Lords until 1999. He took his seat in 1937, when he reached maturity and received his writ of summons. He did not turn 21 until the day after the 1937 coronation of George VI, which he was allowed to attend as a minor.

Townshend sat as a Conservative, attending debates irregularly until the passage of the House of Lords Act 1999.

== Career ==
In 1936 he joined the Norfolk Yeomanry, later transferring to the Scots Guards and serving in World War II. In 1940, he was involved in a serious road accident in which a fellow officer, Lord Blythswood, was killed.

In 1958, Lord Townshend led the consortium Anglia Television in its successful bid to operate the ITV franchise for the east of England, and served as Chairman of Anglia for 28 years, to 1986. His other business interests included serving as vice-chairman of the Norwich Union insurance company, chairman of AP Bank, and a director of Riggs National Bank and London Merchant Securities.

He was chairman of the Royal Norfolk Agricultural Association and from 1951 to 1961, he was a Deputy Lieutenant of Norfolk. Townshend was an active freemason.

== Family ==
Lord Townshend married, firstly, Elizabeth Pamela Audrey Luby (d. 1989), daughter of Lt.-Col. Thomas Luby, on 2 September 1939. They had three children:

- Lady Carolyn Elizabeth Ann Townshend (born 27 September 1940); she married Antonio Capellini on 13 October 1962 and they were divorced in 1971. They have one son (Cenzo Townshend). She briefly remarried Edgar Bronfman in January 1973.
- Lady Joanna Agnes Townshend (born 19 August 1943); she married Jeremy Bradford, son of Commander George F. N. Bradford RN, on 27 September 1962 and they were divorced in 1968. They have one son. She remarried James Morrisey in 1978 and they were divorced in 1984. She married, lastly, Christian Boegnor in 1991.
- Charles Townshend, 8th Marquess Townshend (26 September 1945- -20 November 2025); he married Hermione Ponsonby on 9 October 1975. They had two children, including the current, 9th, Marquess. He remarried Alison Combs on 6 December 1990.

After he and his first wife were divorced in 1960, Lord Townshend married, secondly, Ann Frances Darlow (d. 1988), daughter of Arthur Pellow Darlow, on 22 December 1960. They had two children.

- Lord John Townshend (born 17 June 1962); he married Rachel Chapple in 1987 and they were divorced in 1991. He remarried Helen Burt Chin in 1999. They had one son and one daughter. They divorced in 2010.
- Lady Katherine Townshend (born 29 September 1963); she married Piers W. Dent in April 1991 and were divorced. They have two children. She remarried Guy Bayley in 2001. They have two children.

Lord Townshend married, thirdly, in 2004, Philippa Sophia Swire (born 28 April 1935), former wife of Humphrey Roger Swire (1934–2004), and daughter of George Jardine Kidston-Montgomerie of Southannan. She is the mother of former Conservative MP Hugo, Baron Swire and Sophia Swire.

Lord Townshend died aged 93 on 23 April (St George's Day) 2010, having held his peerage for 89 years. At the time, that made him the longest known holder of a peerage, having passed the previous record, held by Charles St Clair, 13th Lord Sinclair, in March 2009. (Note: The record was surpassed by John Dodson, 3rd Baron Monk Bretton, in January 2021.)

== Arms ==
Coat of arms of George Townshend, 7th Marquess Townshend
Crest A stag statant proper, attired and unguled or. Escutcheon Quarterly, 1st and 4th, Azure, a chevron ermine between three escallops argent (Townshend); 2nd and 3rd, quarterly gules and or, in the first quarter a mullet argent, in the centre a crescent sable (Vere). Supporters Dexter, A stag sable, attired and unguled or; Sinister, A greyhound argent. Motto Hæc generi incrementa fides (Faith obtained these honours for our race’). Other versions The arms are also shown without the Vere quarters.

== Literature ==
- Kidd, Charles; Williamson, David, eds. (1990). Debrett's Peerage and Baronetage. New York: St Martin's Press.
- Leigh Rayment's Peerage Pages

Peerage of Great Britain
Preceded by John Townshend	Marquess Townshend; 1921–2010; Member of the House of Lords (1921–1999)	Succeeded by Charles Townshend
Peerage of England
Preceded by John Townshend	Viscount Raynham; 1921–2010	Succeeded by Charles Townshend
Preceded by John Townshend	Baron Townshend; 1921–2010	Succeeded by Charles Townshend
Baronetage of England
Preceded by John Townshend	Baronet of Raynham; 1921–2010	Succeeded by Charles Townshend
