= Morston Cliff =

Protected area in Norfolk, England

Coordinates: 52.957°N 0.961°E

- Site of Special Scientific Interest
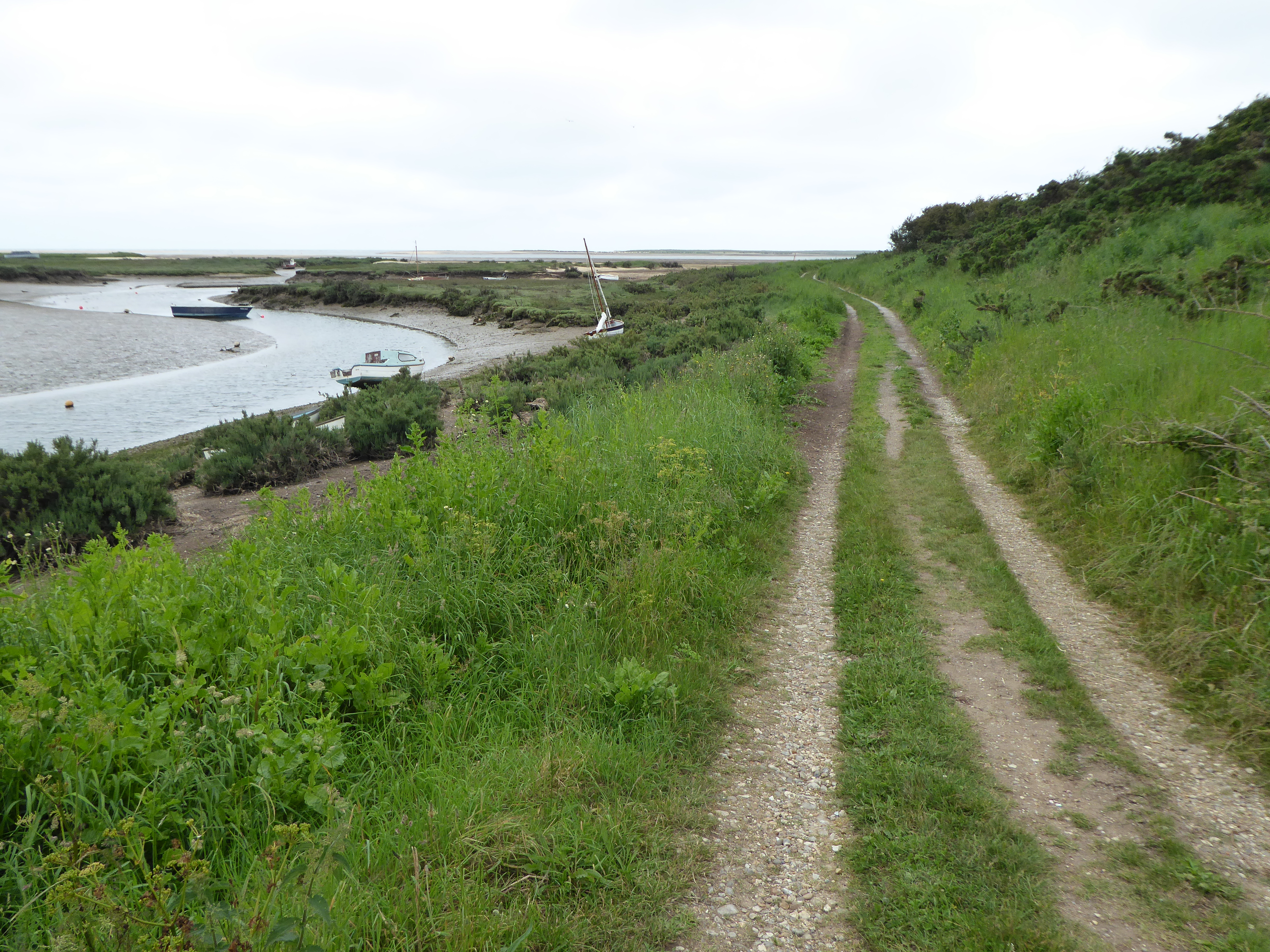
- Location of Morston Cliff.
- Area of search: Norfolk, England
- Grid reference: TF 990 441
- Interest: Geological
- Area: 1.0 hectare (2.5 acres)
- Notification date: 1984
- Location map: Magic Map

Morston Cliff is a 1-hectare (2.5-acre) geological Site of Special Scientific Interest east of Wells-next-the-Sea in Norfolk, England. It is a Geological Conservation Review site. It is part of Blakeney National Nature Reserve, which is managed by the National Trust, and of the Norfolk Coast Area of Outstanding Natural Beauty.

This key Pleistocene site has the only interglacial deposit of a raised beach in East Anglia. It is believed to be Ipswichian, dating to around 125,000 years ago, and is overlain by glacial deposits of the late Devensian Hunstanton Till.

The Peddars Way and Norfolk Coast Path go through the site.
