= John Townshend, 6th Marquess Townshend =

British Marquess (1866-1921)

The Most Honourable The Marquess Townshend DL
- Arms of Townshend: Azure, a chevron ermine between three escallops argent

Personal details
- Born: John James Dudley Stuart Townshend; 17 October 1866
- Died: 17 November 1921 (aged 55)
- Spouse: Gwladys Sutherst (m. 1905)
- Children: George Townshend, 7th Marquess Townshend; Lady Elizabeth Townshend
- Parent(s): John Townshend, 5th Marquess Townshend; Lady Anne Elizabeth Clementina Duff

John James Dudley Stuart Townshend, 6th Marquess Townshend DL (17 October 1866 – 17 November 1921), known as Viscount Raynham from 1866 to 1899, was a British peer.

== Early life ==
Townshend was the son of John Villiers Stuart Townshend, 5th Marquess Townshend, and Lady Anne Elizabeth Clementina Duff. His paternal grandfather was John Townshend, 4th Marquess Townshend and his maternal grandfather was James Duff, 5th Earl Fife. His father was a Member of Parliament for Tamworth before his elevation to the House of Lords in 1863. His maternal uncle was Alexander Duff, 1st Duke of Fife, son-in-law of King Edward VII.

His grandmother, Agnes Duff, Countess Fife, was the second daughter of the 18th Earl of Erroll and his wife, Elizabeth FitzClarence, an illegitimate daughter of King William IV.

== Career and peerage ==
Upon the death of his father in 1899, he succeeded as the 11th Baronet Townshend of Rainham, the 9th Baron Townshend of Lynn Regis, the 6th Marquess Townshend of Raynham, and the 9th Viscount Townshend of Raynham.

Lord Townshend served as the Deputy Lieutenant of Norfolk.

== Personal life ==
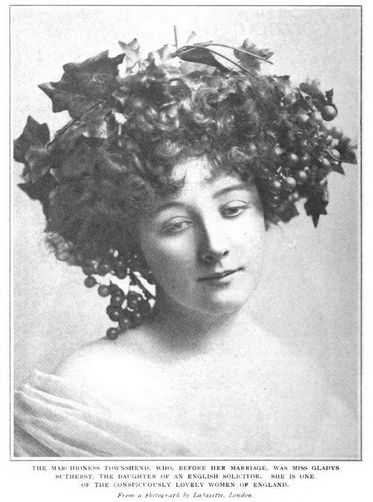
Gwladys, Marchioness of Townshend, from a 1908 publication.

Heavily in debt, Townshend was forced to sell many of the family's valuables, including nearly 200 masterpieces, including works by Thomas Gainsborough, Peter Paul Rubens, and Anthony van Dyck. He leased the family estate Raynham Hall, before traveling to America to find a rich wife. Lord Townshend became engaged to a Mrs. Evelyn Sheffield of Jacksonville, Florida, but broke off the engagement "when he discovered she was not as rich as she had implied." After he returned to England, he was introduced to Thomas Sutherst, a barrister who agreed to pay off his debts if he married his daughter. Lord Townshend agreed and on 9 August 1905, he married Gwladys Ethel Gwendolen Eugénie Sutherst.

Shortly after the wedding, his new father-in-law attempted to have Lord Townshend declared insane. However, "a court found him incapable of managing his own financial affairs, but sane enough to remain at liberty, under the care of his wife." Despite her father's manipulations, reportedly the Marchioness was genuinely devoted to Townshend and worked diligently to restore the family fortunes so her children could be raised at Raynham Hall, although some of the family's land holdings elsewhere were sold. Before his death in 1921, they were the parents of:

- George John Patrick Dominic Townshend, 7th Marquess Townshend (1916–2010), who married three times and served as chairman of Anglia Television from 1958 to 1986.
- Lady Elizabeth Mary Gladys Townshend (1917–1950), who married Sir Eric White, 2nd Baronet. She later married John Clifford Roberts.

Lord Townshend died in November 1921, aged 55, and was succeeded in his titles by his five-year-old son George. Lady Townshend later married Bernard le Strange and died in 1959.

=== Descendants ===
The current Marquess Townshend, Charles Townshend, 8th Marquess Townshend (born 1945), is his grandson. The music producer and sound engineer Cenzo Townshend (b. 1963) is his great-grandson.

== Arms ==
Coat of arms of John Townshend, 6th Marquess Townshend
Crest A stag statant proper, attired and unguled or. Escutcheon Quarterly, 1st and 4th, Azure, a chevron ermine between three escallops argent (Townshend); 2nd and 3rd, quarterly gules and or, in the first quarter a mullet argent, in the centre a crescent sable (Vere). Supporters Dexter, A stag sable, attired and unguled or; Sinister, A greyhound argent. Motto Hæc generi incrementa fides (Faith obtained these honours for our race’). Other versions The arms are also shown without the Vere quarters.

Peerage of Great Britain
Preceded by John Townshend	Marquess Townshend; 1899 – 1921	Succeeded by George Townshend
