= Gwladys Sutherst Townshend =

British writer

The Most Honourable The Marchioness Townshend
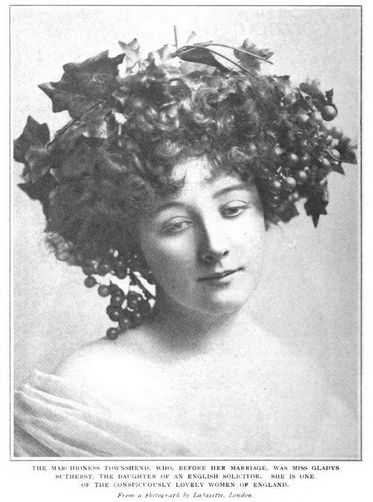
- Gwladys, Marchioness of Townshend, from a 1908 publication.
- Born: Gwladys Ethel Gwendolen Eugénie Sutherst; 1884
- Died: 1959 (aged 74–75)
- Occupation: Writer
- Spouses: John Townshend, 6th Marquess Townshend (m. 1905; died 1921): Bernard le Strange
- Parent: Thomas Sutherst
- Relatives: Charles Townshend, 8th Marquess Townshend (grandson); Cenzo Townshend (great-grandson)

Gwladys Ethel Gwendolen Eugénie Sutherst (1884 – 1959), after 1905 Gwladys, Marchioness Townshend, was a British writer. In addition to writing novels, poems, and plays, she was probably "the first peeress to write for the cinema." She also served a term as Mayor of King's Lynn. The details of her marriage and finances were often aired in the courtroom and in newspapers.

== Early life ==
Gwladys Sutherst was the daughter of Thomas Sutherst, a barrister.

== Career ==
Gwladys Sutherst Townshend was credited as the scenarist on eight silent films, all of them now lost, made by the Clarendon studio, all of them made in 1913, 1914, or 1915, all starring Dorothy Bellew and directed by Wilfred Noy. Titles included The Convent Gate, The House of Mystery, and A Strong Man's Love. She claimed to be "the first peeress to write for the cinema."

Her play Sir John and the Compriere was produced in 1914, in London. She co-edited a fiction collection, True Ghost Stories (1936). Her autobiography, It Was, and It Wasn't, was published in 1937. Other books by Townshend included a book of poems, In the King's Garden (1906), and a novel, The Widening Circle (1920).

In 1928 she was elected to a term as Mayor of King's Lynn, though she opposed the idea of women as lawmakers. "As Mayor I give two banquets a year, a reception to the townspeople, open bazars, lay cornerstones, and represent the town at all affairs," she explained to an American reporter. In that role, she travelled to the United States in 1929, to help the city of Lynn, Massachusetts, celebrate its tercentenary.

== Personal life ==
Gwladys Sutherst married twice. In 1905 she married John Townshend, 6th Marquess Townshend; their financial arrangements became the subject of scandal and lawsuits, when it was revealed that her father did not make an expected settlement on the couple. There were also concerns that her husband's mental status was unsound, and accusations that Gwladys was keeping him hidden even from his mother. The Townshends had two children, George and Elizabeth; given earlier scandals, the paternity of the Townshend children was also a matter of press speculation. Gwladys was widowed when John died in 1921. She remarried, to Bernard le Strange. She died in 1959, aged 75 years, in London.

The current Marquess Townshend, Charles Townshend, is her grandson. Music producer and sound engineer Cenzo Townshend is her great-grandson.
