= Morston Hall =

Country house hotel

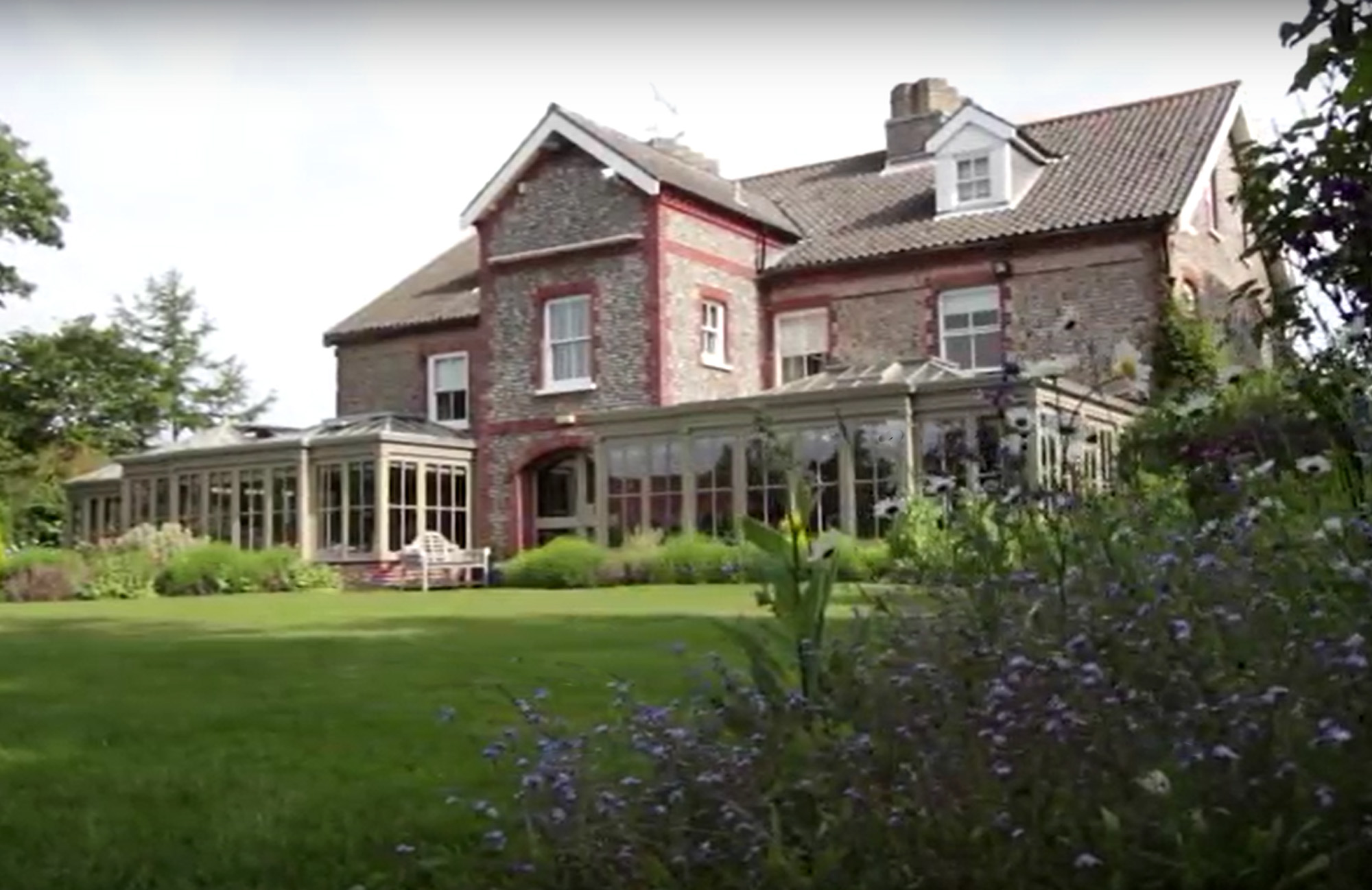
Morston Hall

Morston Hall in the parish of Morston near Holt, Norfolk, is a building of historical significance. The original house was built in about 1640 and cellars and chimneys from it survive. It was substantially altered in the 18th century and a wing was added in the 19th century. It was owned by the Townshend viscounts from Raynham Hall from the 17th century until 1911 and during this time it was tenanted by various notable people. Today it is a hotel. It also caters for special events particularly weddings.

== Early history ==
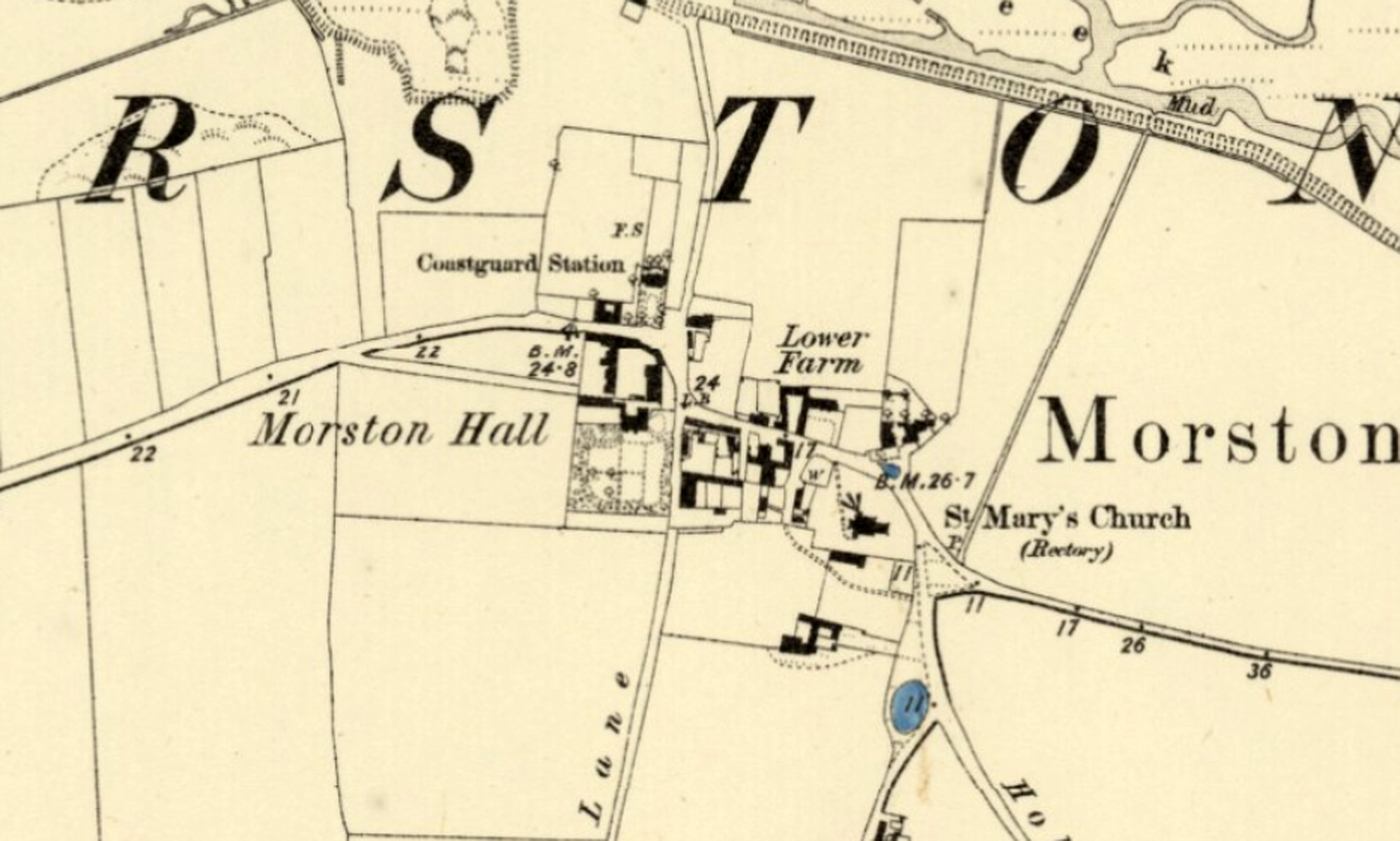
Map of Morston 1886

The Manor of Morston was owned by Sir Nathaniel Bacon of Stiffkey in the 16th century. In 1593 his daughter Anne married Sir John Townshend (1567–1603) and part of the marriage agreement was that the couple would inherit several manors including Morston. Sir Nathaniel died in 1622 and as Anne's husband Sir John had predeceased him he left the land to her son Sir Roger Townshend (1596–1637). It remained in the Townshend family until 1911. It was therefore the Townshends who built the first part of Morston Hall in about 1640 and made the later alterations and additions.

The Tithe Map of 1838 reveals that Lord Charles Townshend was the owner of Morston Hall and George Wood was the tenant. The Wood family were residents of the Hall for about one hundred years.

George Wood (1796–1865) was born in Morston in 1796. In 1820 he married Elizabeth Wrench whose parents Elizabeth and Jonathan lived in Morston. The couple had six children, three sons and three daughters. This family lived in Morston Hall and farmed the adjoining 2000 acres for about forty years. George died in 1865 and his son William George Wood (1824–1903) took over the farm and lived in the Hall. There is an ornate gravestone in Morston Church for him which can be seen at this reference.

In 1857 William married Fanny Page. She was the daughter of Christopher Thomas Page of Stiffkey. They had seven children, two sons and five daughters. When he died in 1903 his son Robert Wrench Wood (1876–1949) moved into the Hall and continued to manage their large farm until its sale in 1911. In 1910 he married Violet Irene Chamberlin who was the daughter of Sir George Moore Chamberlin, a prominent Norfolk businessman. They had two sons.

== Later residents ==
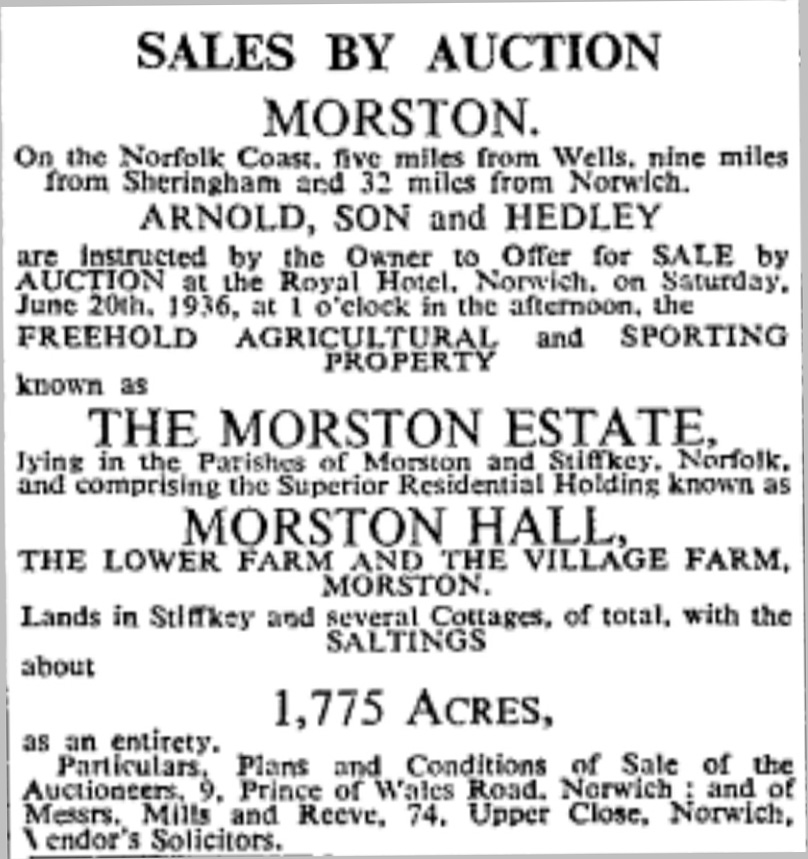
Advertisement for the sale of Morston Hall 1936

In 1911 the Townshend family put both their Stiffkey and Morston properties on the market which together consisted of over 6000 acres. It included Morston Hall which was described as "a desirable residence for a gentleman farmer".

After its sale it continued to be a rental property and in 1914 Major Philip Hamond (1883–1953) took a lease on the Hall. He was a highly decorated soldier gaining two DSO awards and a Military Cross. He served in the Boer War and was wounded and then later was in First World War. He lived at the Hall with his wife Rita until about 1922 when he built Scaldbeck House at Stiffkey. In 1936 the property was advertised for sale. The sale notice is shown.

Major Robert Hamond and his wife Elizabeth Marion were residents of the Hall from about 1958 until 1964. He was the son of Major Philip Hamond.

Bernard Alan Copping was the owner for some years until his death in 1986. He was a millionaire who specialised in fine silver and was considered one of the world's silver experts.

In 1992, the Hall was bought by Tracy and Galton Blackiston, who ran it as a country house hotel and Michelin-starred restaurant. In 2025, it was bought by the hotelier Henry Elworthy.
