= Morston =

Village in Norfolk, England

Coordinates: 52.95466°N 0.98812°E

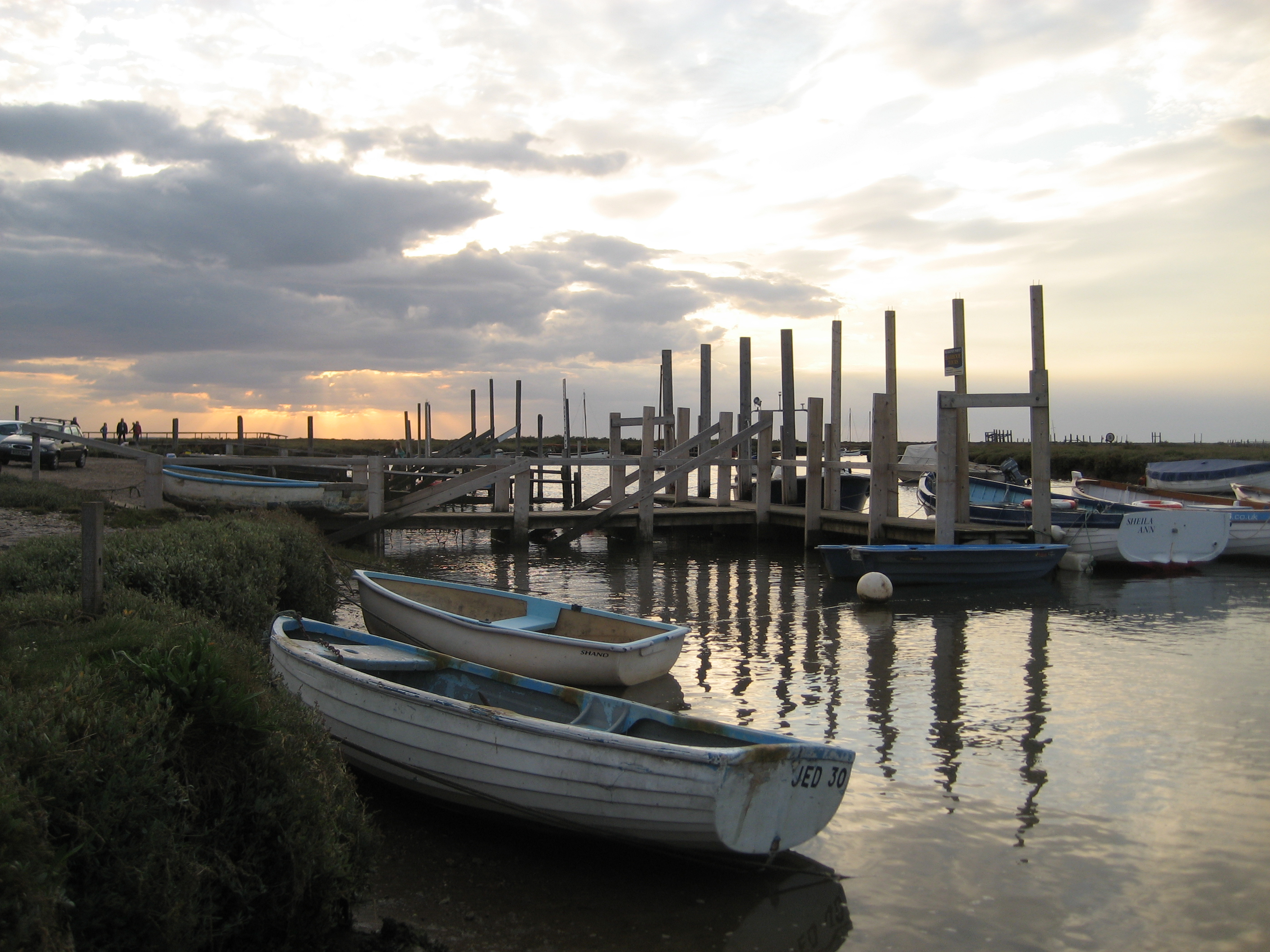
- The quay at Morston

- Location within Norfolk
- Area: 8.68 km^{2} (3.35 sq mi)
- OS grid reference: TG008438
- Civil parish: Morston
- District: North Norfolk
- Shire county: Norfolk
- Region: East
- Country: England
- Sovereign state: United Kingdom
- Post town: HOLT
- Postcode district: NR25
- Police: Norfolk
- Fire: Norfolk
- Ambulance: East of England

Morston is a village and civil parish in the English county of Norfolk. It covers an area of 8.68 km^{2} (3.35 sq mi) and had a population of 86 in 42 households at the 2001 census. The population remained less than 100 at the 2011 Census and was included in the civil parish of Blakeney. For the purposes of local government, it falls within the district of North Norfolk.

Like its neighbour Blakeney, Morston, used to be a major port 400 years ago, but is now only used by a small number of fishing boats, leisure craft and the regular seal watching trips which leave for Blakeney Point.

== History ==
The place-name 'Morston' is first attested in the Domesday Book of 1086, where it appears as Merstona. The name means 'marsh town or settlement'.

Harold Davidson (1875 – 1937), the "Rector of Stiffkey" was also the parish priest here.

The father of writer Annie Hall Cudlip commanded the local Coastguard station.

The 1973 Derby Stakes winner was Morston, the horse being named after the village. Running for just the second time he was returned at odds of 25–1. His half-brother Blakeney won the same race in 1969.

== Contemporary Morston ==
All Saints' Church is a Grade I listed building. The Morston Book Sale, organised by the Friends of Morston Church, was staged for the final time in 2019; it raised over £80,000 during its 10 years.

Morston Hall, a country-house hotel and restaurant formerly owned by Galton Blackiston, is in the parish.

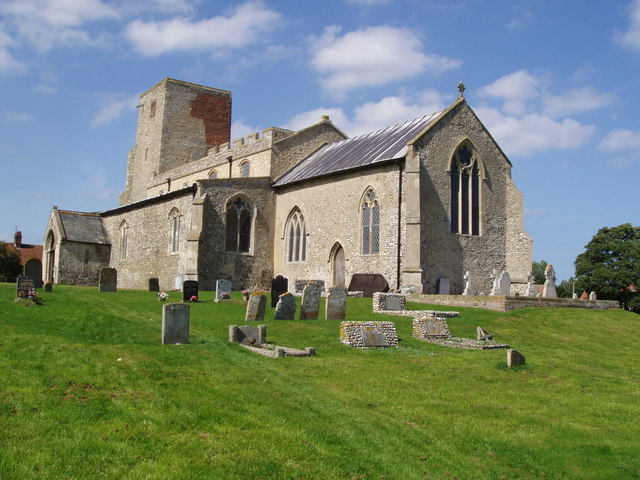
The Church of All Saints, Morston

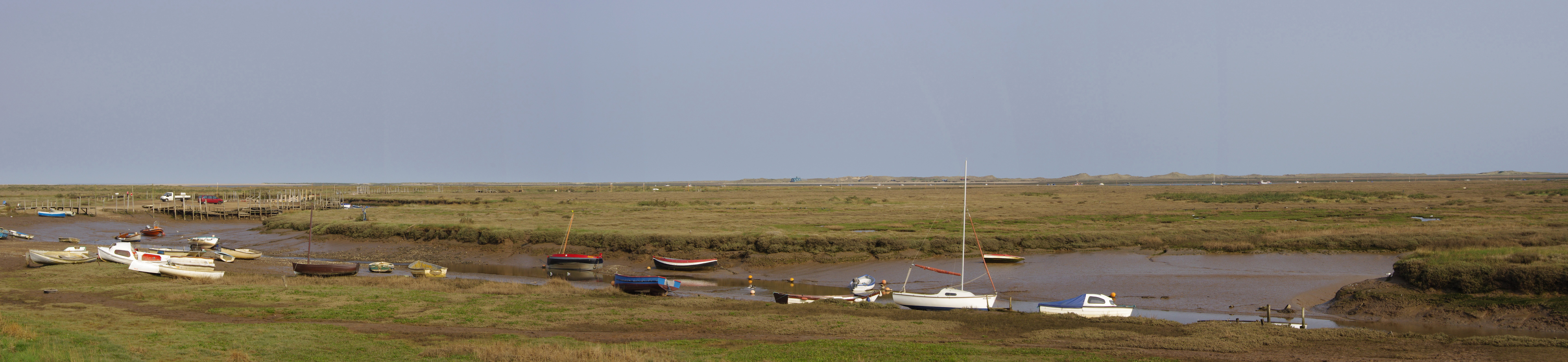
Panoramic view of Morston Quay at morning low tide

== See also ==
- Morston Cliff
