= Ysgol Gyfun Gymraeg Bro Edern =

Location
- Llanedeyrn Road, Penylan; Cardiff, CF23 9DT; Wales; 51.50454°N 3.15563°W

Information
- Type: Community school
- Established: 2012
- Local authority: Cardiff Council
- Department for Education URN: 402295 Tables
- Teaching staff: 45.5 (on an FTE basis)
- Gender: Mixed
- Age range: 11–19
- Enrolment: 907 (2022)
- Student to teacher ratio: 13.6
- Language: Welsh
- Houses: Hafren; Rhymni; Taf
- Colours: Black and Jade
- Publication: Yr Elain
- Website: www.broedern.cymru

Ysgol Gyfun Gymraeg Bro Edern is a mixed, Welsh-medium secondary school for pupils between 11 and 19 years old. The school is situated in Penylan, Cardiff, Wales. As of 2022, it had 907 pupils on roll, with 131 pupils in the sixth form. 18 per cent of pupils came from Welsh-speaking homes in 2017.

The name 'Bro Edern' (Vale of Edern) refers to Saint Edern who is commemorated in the name Llanedeyrn. Of the three Welsh-medium secondary schools serving Cardiff, it is the newest (the others being Ysgol Gyfun Gymraeg Glantaf and Ysgol Gyfun Gymraeg Plasmawr).

== History ==
Ysgol Gyfun Gymraeg Bro Edern was founded in September 2012, as Cardiff's third Welsh-medium secondary school, due to increasing demand for Welsh-medium education in Cardiff. During its first academic year (2012–13) when it had 71 year 7 pupils, it was based temporarily on the site of Ysgol Gyfun Gymraeg Glantaf, before moving to its permanent buildings, the former site of St Teilo's Church in Wales High School by September 2013. The school was inspected for the first time in November 2017 when Estyn reported that "The school is a very close-knit community with an extremely caring and supportive ethos." Following the inspection, the school was invited by Estyn to prepare an effective practice report on its work in relation to the use that teachers and pupils make of information and communication technology to support learning and teaching.
