= 2023 Tamworth by-election =

UK parliamentary by-election

- 19 October 2023

Tamworth constituency
- Turnout: 35.9% (▼28.4 pp)
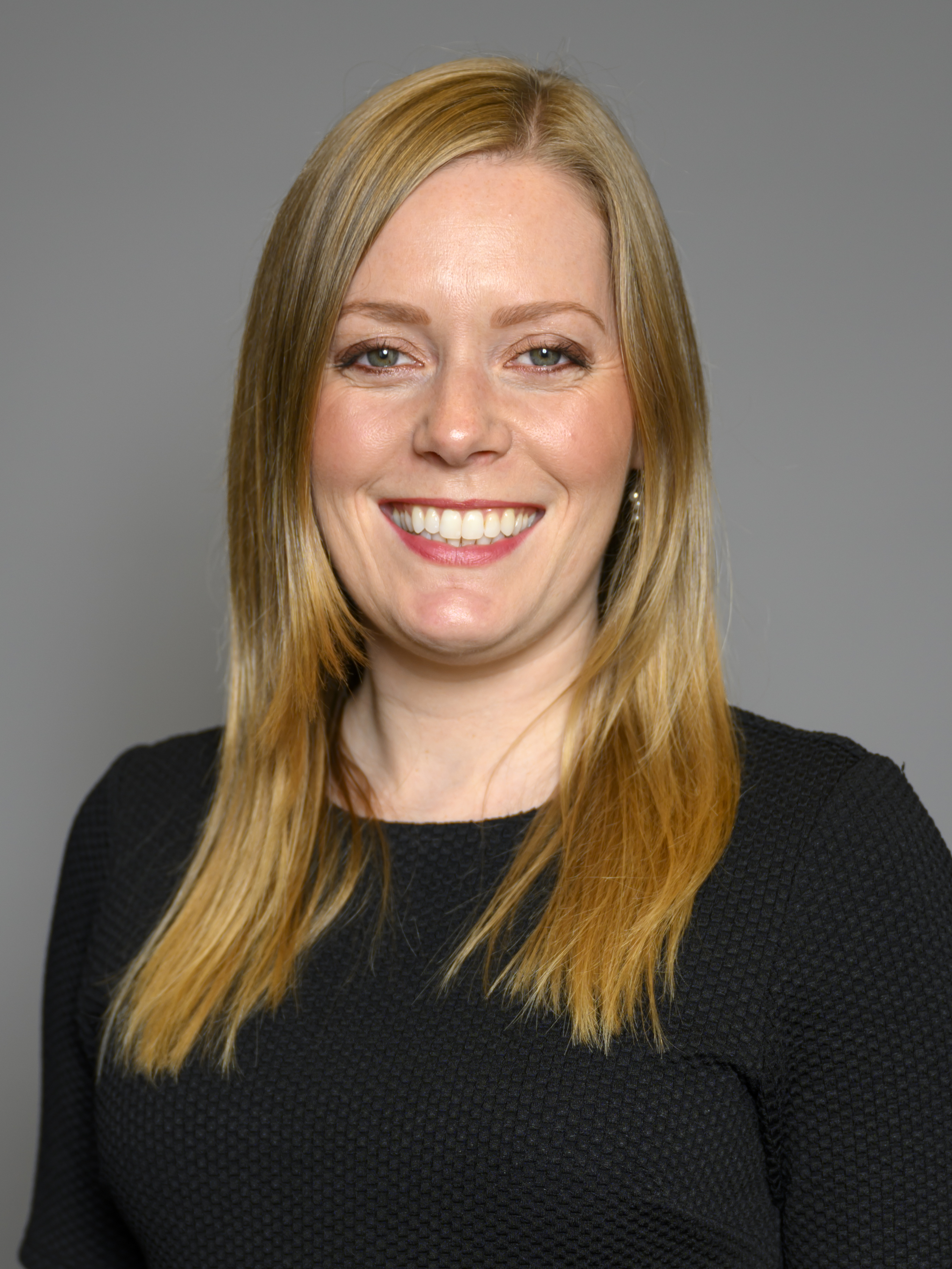

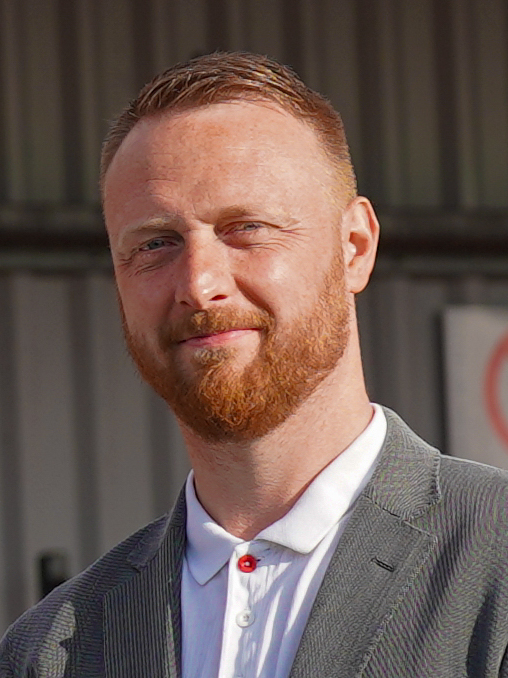
	First party	Second party	Third party
			Ref
Candidate	Sarah Edwards	Andrew Cooper	Ian Cooper
Party	Labour	Conservative	Reform
Popular vote	11,719	10,403	1,376
Percentage	45.8%	40.7%	5.4%
Swing	▲22.1 pp	▼25.6 pp	New
- Boundary of the Tamworth constituency in Staffordshire
MP before election
Chris Pincher
Independent
Elected MP
Sarah Edwards
Labour

A by-election for the United Kingdom parliamentary constituency of Tamworth was held on 19 October 2023, due to the resignation of incumbent Conservative MP Chris Pincher following a sexual misconduct scandal. Sarah Edwards, the Labour candidate, won the seat with a 23.9% swing, the second-biggest from Conservative to Labour since 1945.

The by-election was held on the same day as the 2023 Mid Bedfordshire by-election, which was also a Labour gain from the Conservatives.

== Background ==
=== Chris Pincher resignation ===
Chris Pincher, a former Deputy Chief Whip, was involved in a controversy following allegations of sexual misconduct. Pincher resigned as Deputy Chief Whip on 30 June 2022, and was suspended as a Conservative MP following allegations that he had sexually assaulted two men. Further allegations were made in July, which antedated his appointment by then-Prime Minister Boris Johnson, who originally denied knowledge of the allegations. It was then revealed Johnson had been aware, and many cited this scandal as the catalyst which brought down the Johnson ministry.

The Standards Committee upheld the allegations of sexual assault in July 2023 and recommended an eight-week suspension from the Commons. Pincher appealed the decision in early September, but lost the appeal. The eight-week suspension would have been enough to trigger a recall petition, but Pincher resigned his position on 7 September before the House could vote on the recommended suspension.

=== Constituency ===
The Tamworth constituency consists of the southeastern corner of Staffordshire, including the towns of Fazeley and Tamworth. It was previously considered to be a bellwether constituency, but had become a Conservative safe seat in recent years, with a majority of nearly 20,000 in the 2019 election. During the New Labour years of 1997 to 2010, Brian Jenkins served as the constituency's MP. The constituency voted 66% for leave in the 2016 EU membership referendum. The constituency last had a by-election in 1996, when it was known as South East Staffordshire. Jenkins, the Labour candidate, took the seat from the Conservatives.

== Candidates ==
On 18 June 2023, prior to Pincher's resignation, Conservative MP Eddie Hughes had been selected as the candidate for Tamworth at the 2024 general election. Hughes is currently the MP for the nearby Walsall North constituency, which will be abolished at the 2024 general election under the 2023 Periodic Review of Westminster constituencies. Had Hughes stood and won the by-election, this would have triggered another by-election by means of his vacating the seat for Walsall North. However, Hughes ruled out contesting the by-election on 7 September.

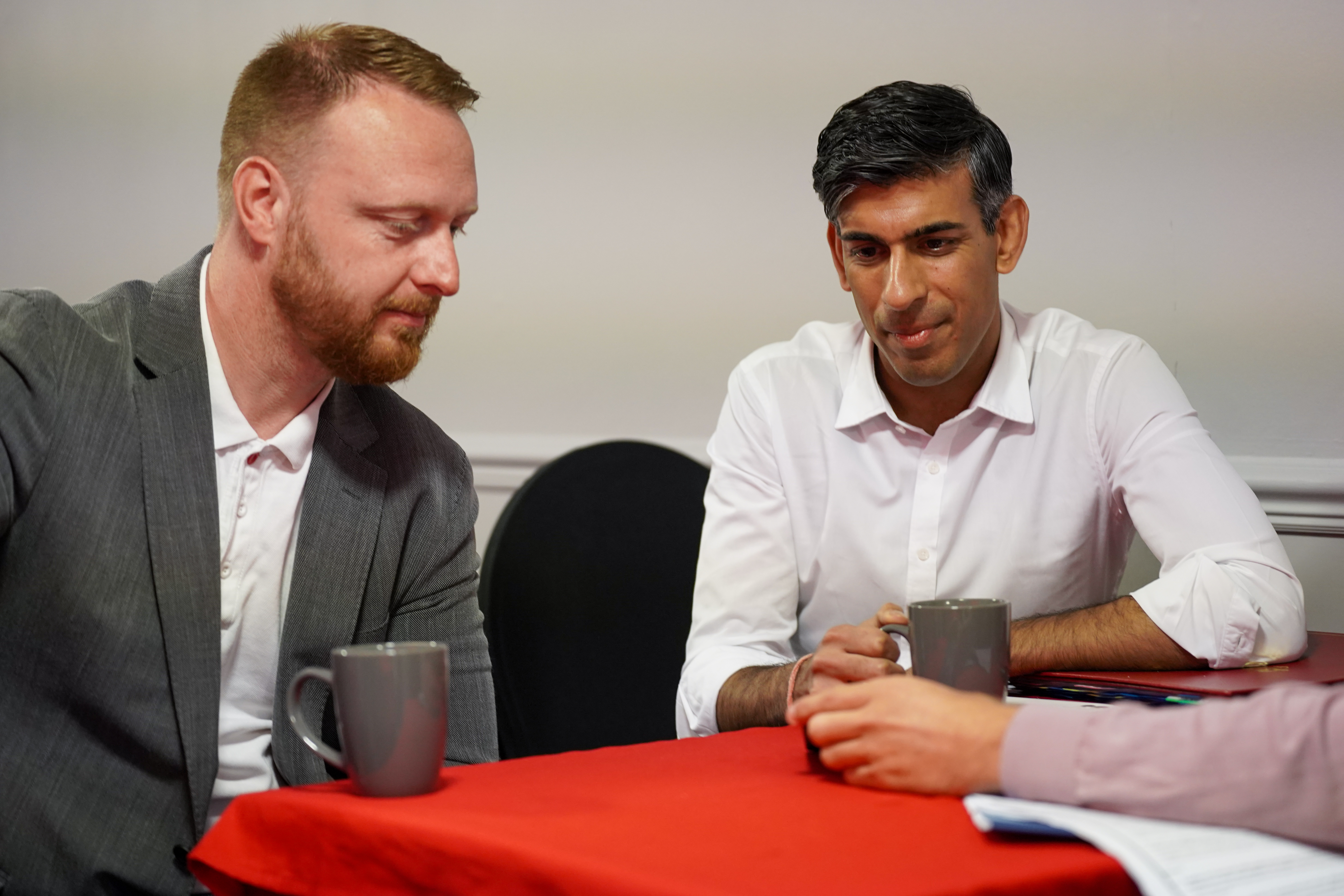
Conservative candidate Andrew Cooper with Rishi Sunak, during the campaign.

The Conservatives selected Andrew Cooper, a councillor in Tamworth since 2021, as their candidate. Cooper was raised on a council estate in Tamworth and served in the Army. Before the election it was reported that he had shared an offensive tweet about families in poverty. At the count he left the stage hurriedly during the winning candidate's speech.

On 23 July, Labour selected Sarah Edwards to be their candidate. She is a Unite union official from Moseley, Birmingham, who has worked for the charity Oxfam.

Sunny Virk, a local barrister and mediator, was the Liberal Democrat candidate. He would later contest the 2024 West Midlands mayoral election, coming last. Ian Cooper is the Reform UK candidate. Former university lecturer Dr. Sue Howarth stood for the Green Party. Robert Bilcliff stood for the UK Independence Party. He was a member of Tamworth Borough Council for Stonydelph from 2016 to 2021. Ashlea Simon, the chair of Britain First, stood for that party.

Local teacher Richard Kingstone, a former Mayor of Tamworth, announced his intention to stand as an independent, but later made a statement announcing he would no longer be standing due to personal circumstances.

== Result ==
Bar chart of the election result.

2023 Tamworth by-election
Party	Candidate	Votes	%	±%
Labour	Sarah Edwards	11,719	45.8	+22.1
Conservative	Andrew Cooper	10,403	40.7	–25.6
Reform	Ian Cooper	1,373	5.4	New
Britain First	Ashlea Simon	580	2.3	New
UKIP	Robert Bilcliff	436	1.7	–0.1
Green	Sue Howarth	417	1.6	–0.4
Liberal Democrats	Sunny Virk	417	1.6	–3.7
Monster Raving Loony	Howling Laud Hope	155	0.6	New
No description	Peter Longman	86	0.3	New
Majority		1,316	5.1	N/A
Turnout		25,586	35.9	–28.4
Labour gain from Conservative		Swing	+23.9	

A similar substantial swing, resulting in a Labour gain from the Conservatives, was seen in the concurrent Mid Bedfordshire by-election. Psephologist John Curtice determined these results to be "one of worst nights any government has endured".

Parties to the right of the Conservatives (Reform UK, Britain First and UKIP) received a total combined vote of 9.4%, although Politics.co.uk suggested that this was due to the low turnout.

== Previous result ==
General election 2019: Tamworth
Party	Candidate	Votes	%	±%
Conservative	Chris Pincher	30,542	66.3	▲5.3
Labour Co-op	Chris Bain	10,908	23.7	▼11.1
Liberal Democrats	Rob Wheway	2,426	5.3	▲1.1
Green	Andrew Tilley	935	2.0	New
UKIP	Robert Bilcliff	814	1.8	New
Independent	John Wright	431	0.9	New
Majority		19,634	42.6	▲16.4
Turnout		46,056	64.3	▼1.8
Conservative hold		Swing	▲8.2	

== See also ==
- 2023 Mid Bedfordshire by-election, held on the same day.
- 1996 South East Staffordshire by-election, a by-election in the predecessor constituency.
