= Ysgol Gyfun Gymraeg Glantaf =

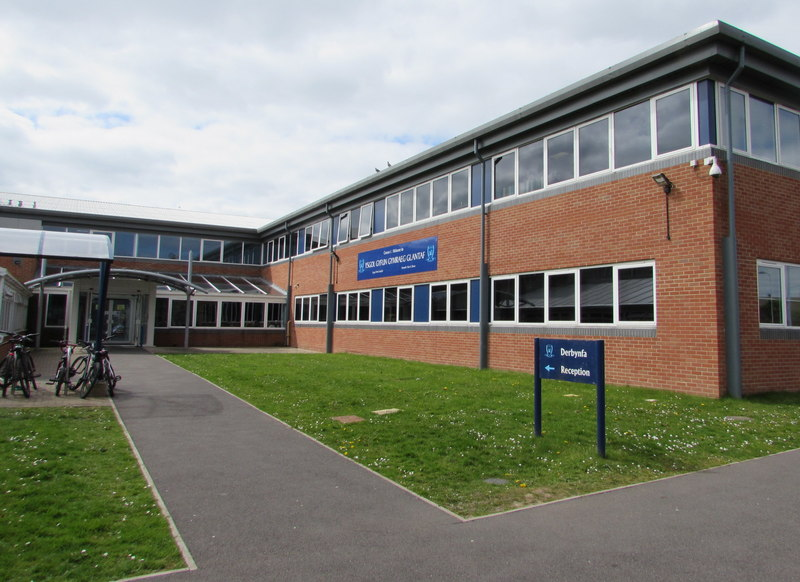
- Main entrance to reception

Location
- Bridge Road; Cardiff, CF14 2JL; Wales; 51.50120°N 3.22605°W

Information
- Type: State school
- Motto: 'Coron Gwlad Ei Mamiaith' ('A Country's Crown is Her Mother Tongue')
- Established: 1978
- Department for Education URN: 401885 Tables
- Head Teacher: Matthew Evans
- Gender: All
- Age: 12 to 18
- Enrolment: 1,498 (2025)
- Language: Welsh
- Houses: Dewi, Dyfrig, Illtud, Teilo
- Colours: Light and dark blue
- Website: www.glantaf.cymru

Ysgol Gyfun Gymraeg Glantaf is a Welsh-medium coeducational secondary school in Llandaff North, a district in the north of Cardiff, Wales; it is the largest of its kind in the country. Of the three Welsh-medium secondary schools serving Cardiff, it was the first to be established; the others are Ysgol Gyfun Gymraeg Plasmawr and Ysgol Gyfun Gymraeg Bro Edern. As of 2025, 49% of pupils came from Welsh-speaking homes.

== History ==
Ysgol Gyfun Gymraeg Glantaf opened in September 1978. This was one month after the 1978 National Eisteddfod of Wales, held in Cardiff and, when a winner for the Bardic Chair could not be found, the chair was donated to Ysgol Glantaf.

While on the one hand the opening of Cardiff's first Welsh language secondary school was seen as a major step, on the other hand there were protests outside the school, with protesters waving placards saying "Welsh Go Home".

The school initially shared premises with the English-language Glantaf High School, but later expanded to occupy the whole building. Its first headmaster was J E Malcolm Thomas, who was succeeded upon his retirement in 1995 by Huw S Thomas, and then by headmistress Rhiannon Lloyd from Rhydywaun School. In early 2010, the board of governors announced that from September 2010, the former head of Rhydywaun School would take over from Rhiannon Lloyd. From September 2010, Alun Davies was headmaster prior to Mathew Evans joining the school in September 2020 as headteacher from Ysgol Gymraeg Ystalyfera Bro Dur.

Pupil numbers at the school increased into four figures during the mid-1980s, necessitating the annexing of the buildings of the old Waterhall School in Fairwater to form the Ysgol Isaf (Lower School), which housed the first and second forms (later years 7 and 8) of the school from 1986. This split-site arrangement continued until the opening of Cardiff's second Welsh-medium comprehensive school, Ysgol Gyfun Gymraeg Plasmawr, in 1998, from which point the Llandaff North site again housed the entirety of Glantaf's pupils.

== Welsh-medium education ==
Ysgol Gyfun Gymraeg Glantaf is a Welsh-medium school, which means that all lessons except English language and literature should take place in the Welsh language. Ysgol Glantaf presents sixth form students for the Welsh Baccalaureate examination.

== Results ==
In 2008, 76% of pupils at GCSE (or equivalent) (ages 15 to 16) year achieved five or more A* - C grades at GCSE, and 76% of pupils at A/AS level (or equivalent) (ages 17 to 18) achieved two or more A - C grades.

== Awards ==
In 2019, Ysgol Gyfun Gymraeg Glantaf was named Welsh Secondary School of the year by the Sunday Times.

== Boys Choir ==
In 2026, Glantaf's Boys Choir was invited to audition for the nineteenth season of ITV's Britain's Got Talent. Led by choirmaster and former X-factor contestant, Lloyd Macey, the group of 11 to 18 year-olds sang 'Never Enough' from The Greatest Showman. This earned them a standing ovation and four "Yes" votes from the judges (Simon Cowell, Alesha Dixon, Amanda Holden, and KSI).

Later in the semi-finals, they performed a cover of 'Stargazing' by Myles Smith with choir member Rhodri Puw starting solo. They placed 3rd in the Public Vote.

== Notable alumni ==
Arts and media

- Huw Bunford, musician, member of Super Furry Animals
- Siân Grigg, BAFTA winner and Oscar nominated Hollywood make up artist
- Ioan Gruffudd, actor
- Ffion Hague, broadcaster and author, wife of Lord William Hague
- Mali Harries, actress
- Gethin Jones, television presenter and former Blue Peter presenter
- Paul Carey Jones, opera singer
- Llwyd Owen, Welsh-language author
- Owen Powell, musician, former member of Catatonia
- Guto Pryce, musician, member of the Super Furry Animals
- Iwan Rheon, actor
- Matthew Rhys, actor
- Huw Stephens, radio presenter and DJ
- Jeremy Huw Williams, opera singer
- Rhodri Williams, sports journalist and television presenter
- Dyfed Wyn-Evans, opera singer
- Siôn Daniel Young, actor

Sport

- Theo Cabango, rugby union, Cardiff Rugby
- Seb Davies, rugby union, Cardiff Rugby & Wales
- Tom Isaacs, rugby union, Ospreys & Cardiff Blues, Wales Sevens
- Darius Jokarzadeh, Olympic weightlifter, represented Wales at the 2014 Commonwealth Games.
- Manon Johnes, women's rugby union, Bristol Bears & Wales
- Meg Jones, women's rugby union, Ealing Trailfinders & England
- Max Llewellyn, rugby union, Gloucester & Wales
- Ioan Lloyd, rugby union, Scarlets & Wales
- Rhys Patchell, rugby union, Cardiff Blues, Scarlets & Wales
- Jamie Roberts, rugby union, Cardiff Blues & Wales
- Jamie Robinson, rugby union, Cardiff Blues & Wales
- Nicky Robinson, rugby union, Cardiff Blues & Wales
- Lee Thomas, rugby union, Cardiff Blues
- Teddy Williams (rugby union), rugby union, Cardiff Rugby & Wales

Politics

- Rhys ab Owen, Plaid Cymru and later Independent Member of the Senedd 2021-2026
- Eluned Morgan, Labour Party Member of the Senedd 2015-2026, Welsh First Minister 2024-2026
- Mair Rowlands, Plaid Cymru Member of the Senedd 2026-

== See also ==
- Emyr Currie-Jones, Chairman of the Education Committee of Cardiff City Council, promoted the foundation of the school
