= 1996 South East Staffordshire by-election =

UK parliamentary by-election

- 11 April 1996
- Turnout: 62.0% (▼20.0 pp)
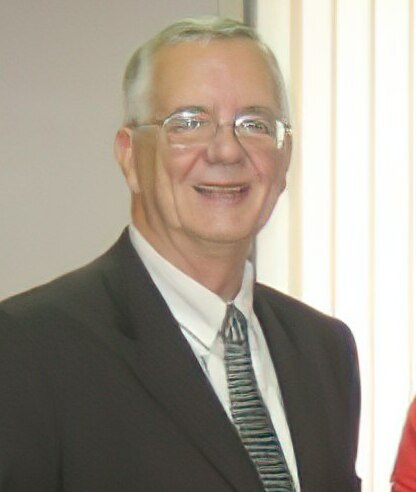
	First party	Second party
Candidate	Brian Jenkins	Timothy James
Party	Labour	Conservative
Popular vote	26,155	12,393
Percentage	60.1%	28.5%
Swing	▲22.0 pp	▼22.2 pp
MP before election
David Lightbown
Conservative
Elected MP
Brian Jenkins
Labour

A by-election for the United Kingdom parliamentary constituency of South East Staffordshire on 11 April 1996, following the death the previous December of the sitting Conservative MP Sir David Lightbown. Labour's Brian Jenkins gained the seat from the Conservatives with a large swing.

== Result ==
South East Staffordshire by-election, 1996
Party	Candidate	Votes	%	±%
Labour	Brian Jenkins	26,155	60.1	+22.0
Conservative	Timothy James	12,393	28.5	–22.2
Liberal Democrats	Janette Davy	2,042	4.7	–4.9
UKIP	Andrew Smith	1,272	2.9	New
Monster Raving Loony	David Sutch	506	1.2	New
National Democrats	Sharron Edwards	358	0.8	New
Liberal	Steven Mountford	332	0.8	New
Churchill Conservative	Leslie Tucker	123	0.3	New
L!VE TV	News Bunny	85	0.2	New
Daily Loonylugs Earring Up the World	Tony Samuelson	80	0.2	New
Natural Law	David Lucas	53	0.1	New
Action Against Crime	Frederick Sandy	53	0.1	New
Restoration of Death Penalty	Alan Wood	45	0.1	New
Majority		13,762	31.6	N/A
Turnout		43,497	62.0	−20.0
Labour gain from Conservative		Swing	+22.1	

== Notes on candidates ==
News Bunny was a character on the cable channel Live TV. The candidate was an employee of the channel who changed his name for the purposes of the election.

The ballot paper description of the candidate N Samuelson was "Daily Loonylugs Earing Up the World".

== See also ==
- 2023 Tamworth by-election (another by-election in the successor constituency)
- List of United Kingdom by-elections
- parliamentary constituencies in Staffordshire
