= Sathnam Sanghera =

British journalist and author (born 1976)

Sathnam Sanghera FRSL
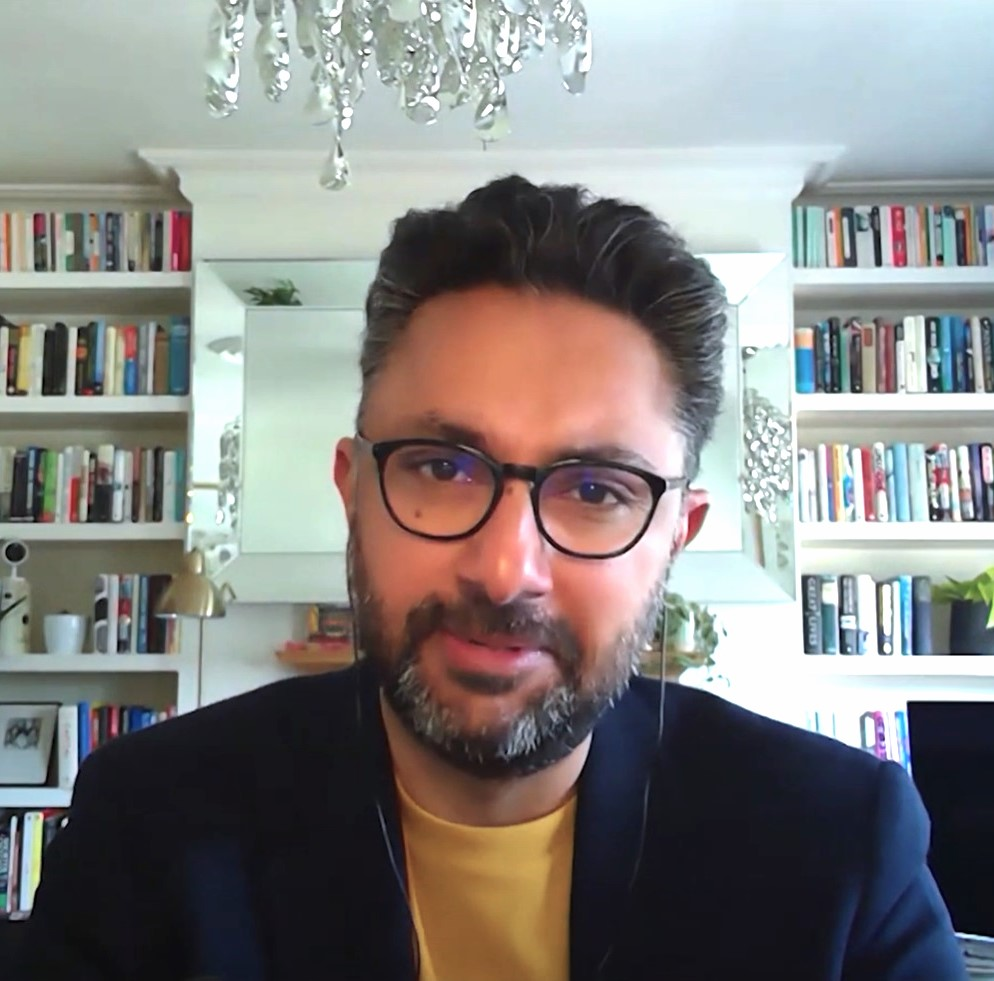
- Sanghera in 2021
- Born: 1976 (age 49–50); Wolverhampton, West Midlands, England
- Education: Wolverhampton Grammar School; Christ's College, Cambridge
- Occupations: Journalist and author
- Notable work: The Boy with the Topknot (2009)
- Website: sathnam.com

Sathnam Sanghera FRSL (born 1976) is a British journalist and best-selling author.

== Early life and education ==
Sathnam Sanghera was born to Punjabi parents in Wolverhampton in 1976. His parents had emigrated from India to the United Kingdom in 1968. He was raised Sikh. He attended Wolverhampton Grammar School, having passed the eleven-plus examination and been funded by the UK government's Assisted Places Scheme. He graduated from Christ's College, Cambridge, with a first-class degree in English Language and Literature in 1998.

== Career ==
Before becoming a writer, Sanghera worked for a burger chain, a hospital laundry, a market research firm, a sewing factory, and a literacy project in New York. As a student, he worked at the Express & Star in Wolverhampton and dressed up as News Bunny for L!VE TV.

Between 1998 and 2006, he was a reporter and feature writer for the Financial Times.Sanghera joined The Times as a columnist and feature writer in 2007. He also writes the motoring column for Management Today magazine.

His memoir, The Boy with the Topknot (2009), originally published in 2008 as If You Don't Know Me By Now, was adapted for BBC Two in 2017. In 2009, he received an honorary Doctor of Letters degree for his contribution to journalism by the University of Wolverhampton.

His novel Marriage Material (2013), about a Sikh family in Wolverhampton, was inspired in part by Arnold Bennett's The Old Wives' Tale. It was adapted for theatre in 2025.

In 2016, Sanghera was elected a Fellow of the Royal Society of Literature (FRSL).

His books Empireland and Empireworld both focus on the history of British imperialism. In November 2021, his Channel 4 documentary series about race, Empire State of Mind, received a four-star review in The Guardian from Chitra Ramaswamy.

== Personal life ==
Sanghera lives in North London.

== Publications ==
- Sanghera, Sathnam (2008). If you don't know me by now: a memoir of love, secrets and lies in Wolverhampton. Viking. ISBN 9780670916702.
  - —— (2009). The boy with the topknot: a memoir of love, secrets and lies in Wolverhampton. London: Penguin. ISBN 978-0-14-102859-0.
- —— (2013). Marriage material. Random House India. ISBN 978-81-8400-482-3.
- —— (2021). Empireland: how imperialism has shaped modern Britain. Viking. ISBN 978-0-241-44529-7.
- —— (2023). Stolen history: the truth about the British empire and how it shaped us. Penguin. ISBN 978-0-241-62343-5.
- —— (2024). Empireworld: how British imperialism has shaped the globe. London: Viking. ISBN 978-0-241-60041-2.
- —— (2026). Tonight the music seems so loud: the meaning of George Michael. Picador. ISBN 978-1-035-06387-1.

== Awards ==
Year	Nominated work	Awards	Category	Result	Ref.
2002		The Press Awards	Young Journalist of the Year	Won	
2008	If You Don’t Know Me By Now	Costa Book Awards	Biography	Shortlisted	
2009	The Boy with the Topknot	PEN/Ackerley Prize		Shortlisted	
2009	The Boy with the Topknot	Mind Book of the Year Award		Won	
2013	Marriage Material	Costa Book Awards	First Novel	Shorlisted	

== See also ==
- List of British Sikhs
