= South East Staffordshire =

UK Parliament constituency (1983–1997)

- Former county constituency for the House of Commons
- County: Staffordshire

1983–1997
- Seats: One
- Created from: Lichfield and Tamworth
- Replaced by: Tamworth, Lichfield

South East Staffordshire was a parliamentary constituency which returned one Member of Parliament (MP) to the House of Commons of the Parliament of the United Kingdom. It was created for the 1983 general election, and abolished for the 1997 general election, when it was replaced by the new Tamworth constituency.

== Boundaries ==
The Borough of Tamworth, and the District of Lichfield wards of Alrewas, Bourne Vale, Fazeley, Little Aston, Mease Valley, Shenstone, Stonnall, Tame, and Whittington.

The main settlement in the constituency was the town of Tamworth; on the seat's abolition for the 1997 general election, it was transferred to the new Tamworth constituency.

== Members of Parliament ==
Election	Member	Party	Notes
1983	David Lightbown	Conservative	Died December 1995
1996 by-election	Brian Jenkins	Labour	Subsequently, MP for Tamworth 1997-2010
1997	constituency abolished: see Tamworth & Lichfield		

== Elections ==
=== Elections in the 1980s ===
General election 1983: Staffordshire South East
Party	Candidate	Votes	%	±%
Conservative	David Lightbown	24,556	50.7	
Labour	Christine Crawley	13,658	28.2	
SDP	Michael Lynch	10,220	21.1	
Majority		10,898	22.5	
Turnout		48,434	76.5	
Conservative win (new seat)				

General election 1987: Staffordshire South East
Party	Candidate	Votes	%	±%
Conservative	David Lightbown	25,115	47.2	▼3.5
SDP	Elisabeth Gluck	14,230	26.7	▲5.6
Labour	David Spilsbury	13,874	26.07	▼2.1
Majority		10,885	20.45	▼2.1
Turnout		53,219	80.4	▲3.9
Conservative hold		Swing	▼4.6	

=== Elections in the 1990s ===
General election 1992: Staffordshire South East
Party	Candidate	Votes	%	±%
Conservative	David Lightbown	29,180	50.7	▲3.5
Labour	Brian Jenkins	21,988	38.2	▲12.1
Liberal Democrats	Gilbert Penlington	5,540	9.6	▼17.1
SDP	Jill Taylor	895	1.6	New
Majority		7,192	12.5	▼7.9
Turnout		57,603	82.0	▲1.6
Conservative hold		Swing	▼4.3	

By-election 1996: South East Staffordshire
Party	Candidate	Votes	%	±%
Labour	Brian Jenkins	26,155	60.1	▲21.9
Conservative	Timothy James	12,393	28.5	▼22.2
Liberal Democrats	Jennette Davy	2,042	4.7	▼4.9
UKIP	Andrew Smith	1,272	2.9	New
Monster Raving Loony	David Sutch	506	1.2	New
National Democrats	Sharron Edwards	358	0.8	New
Liberal	Steven Mountford	332	0.8	New
Independent Conservative	Leslie Tucker	123	0.3	New
L!VE TV	News Bunny	85	0.2	New
Independent	Neville Samuelson	80	0.2	New
Natural Law	David Lucas	53	0.1	New
Independent	Frederick Sandy	53	0.1	New
Independent	Alan Wood	45	0.1	New
Majority		13,762	31.6	N/A
Turnout		43,497	62.0	▼20.0
Labour gain from Conservative		Swing	▲22.1	
