= Llanedeyrn High School =

- Ysgol Uwchradd Llanedeyrn

Location
- Roundwood, Llanedeyrn; Cardiff, CF23 9US; Wales; 51°30′46″N 3°08′59″W

Information
- Type: Community school
- Motto: Achievement, Equality, Excellence
- Established: 1970
- Closed: 2014
- Local authority: Cardiff County Council
- Department for Education URN: 401878 Tables
- Gender: Mixed
- Age range: 11–18
- Website: www.llanedeyrn.cardiff.sch.uk (archive link)

Llanedeyrn High School (Welsh: Ysgol Uwchradd Llanedeyrn) was an 11–16 mixed, community comprehensive school in Llanedeyrn, Cardiff, Wales. It was established in 1970 as the first purpose-built comprehensive school in Wales and closed in 2014.

== History ==
Because of falling pupil numbers, in 2008 a decision was made to close Llanedeyrn and two other Cardiff comprehensive schools. From September 2011, Llanedeyrn High School did not take in any new pupils at Year 7 and the school finally closed in the summer of 2014. Remaining pupils were transferred to Llanishen High School or Cardiff High School, or could apply to attend St Teilo's Church in Wales High School. St Teilo's took over the school's old site at Roundwood Gardens, Llanedeyrn, after moving from its former location in Penylan. New state-of-the-art buildings were constructed on the former playing fields.

== Notable alumni ==
- Justine Picardie, author and journalist
- Ruth Picardie, author and journalist
- Colin Jackson, former athlete, sports presenter
- Suzanne Packer, actress
- Keith Towler, social worker and former Children's Commissioner for Wales
- Chris Blake, Welsh international lawn bowler.
