= Sarah Edwards (British politician) =

British politician (born 1988)

Sarah Edwards MP
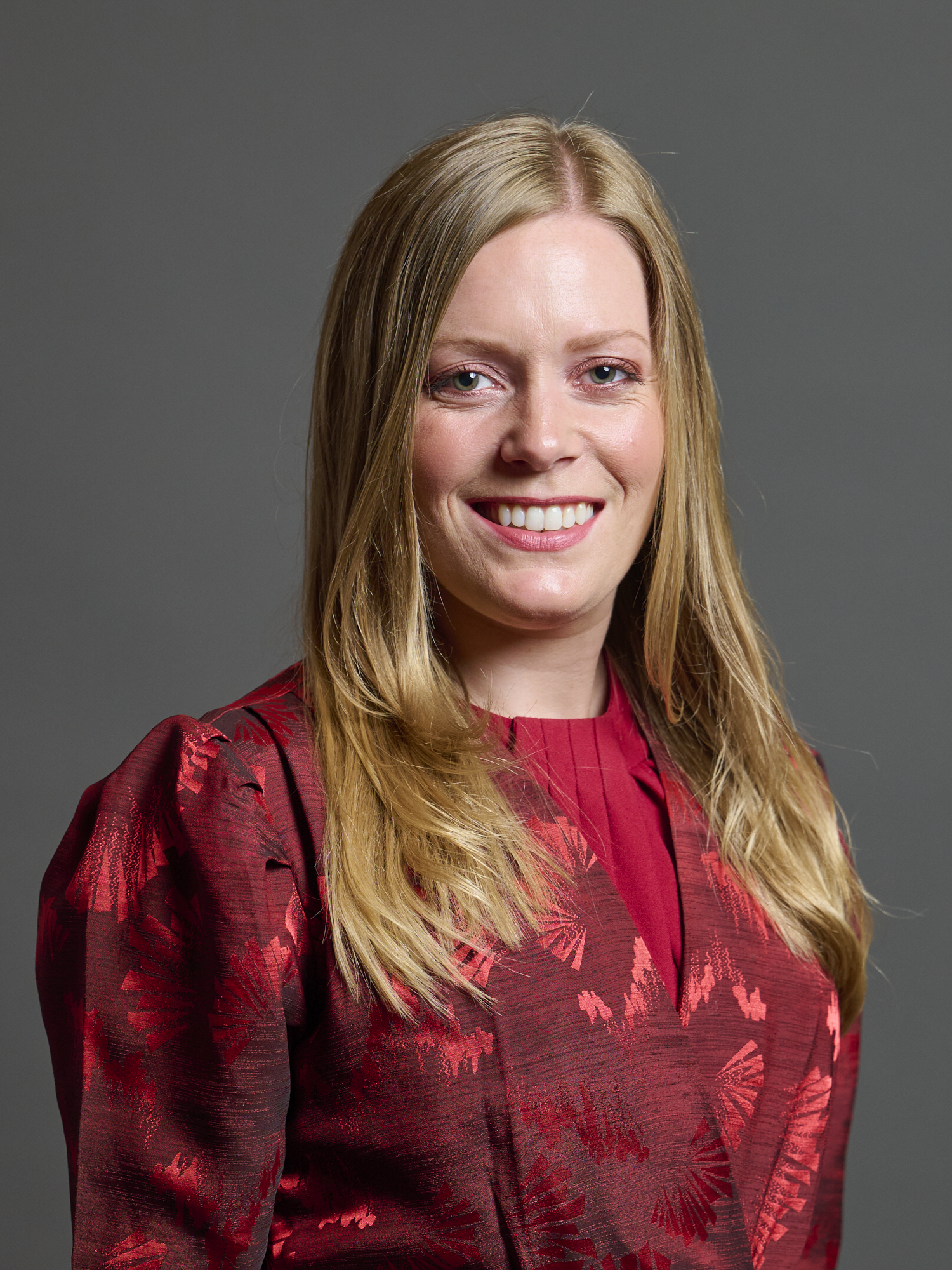
- Official portrait, 2024

Member of Parliament for Tamworth
- Incumbent
- Assumed office 19 October 2023
- Preceded by: Chris Pincher
- Majority: 1,382 (3.1%)

Personal details
- Born: Sarah Siena Edwards; 17 June 1988 (age 38) Moseley, England
- Party: Labour
- Education: Central Saint Martins (BA)

Sarah Siena Edwards (born 17 June 1988) is a British Labour Party politician who has served as the Member of Parliament (MP) for Tamworth in Staffordshire since the by-election in 2023.

== Early life and education ==
Sarah Siena Edwards was born in June 1988 in Moseley, a suburb of south Birmingham. Her father was an English teacher, while her mother and brother both work for the National Health Service. She graduated in Spatial Design from Central Saint Martins in London in 2010.

== Career before Parliament ==
Before being elected to Parliament, Edwards worked as a union organiser in the West Midlands for Unite the Union.

She was previously a governor for the National Health Service. She worked for Oxfam on fundraising and events from 2010 to 2012. She then moved back to Moseley to work for Unite the Union in 2012. She completed the Uprising leadership course in 2012 and joined the US Ambassadors Young Leaders Programme in 2015.

== Parliamentary career ==
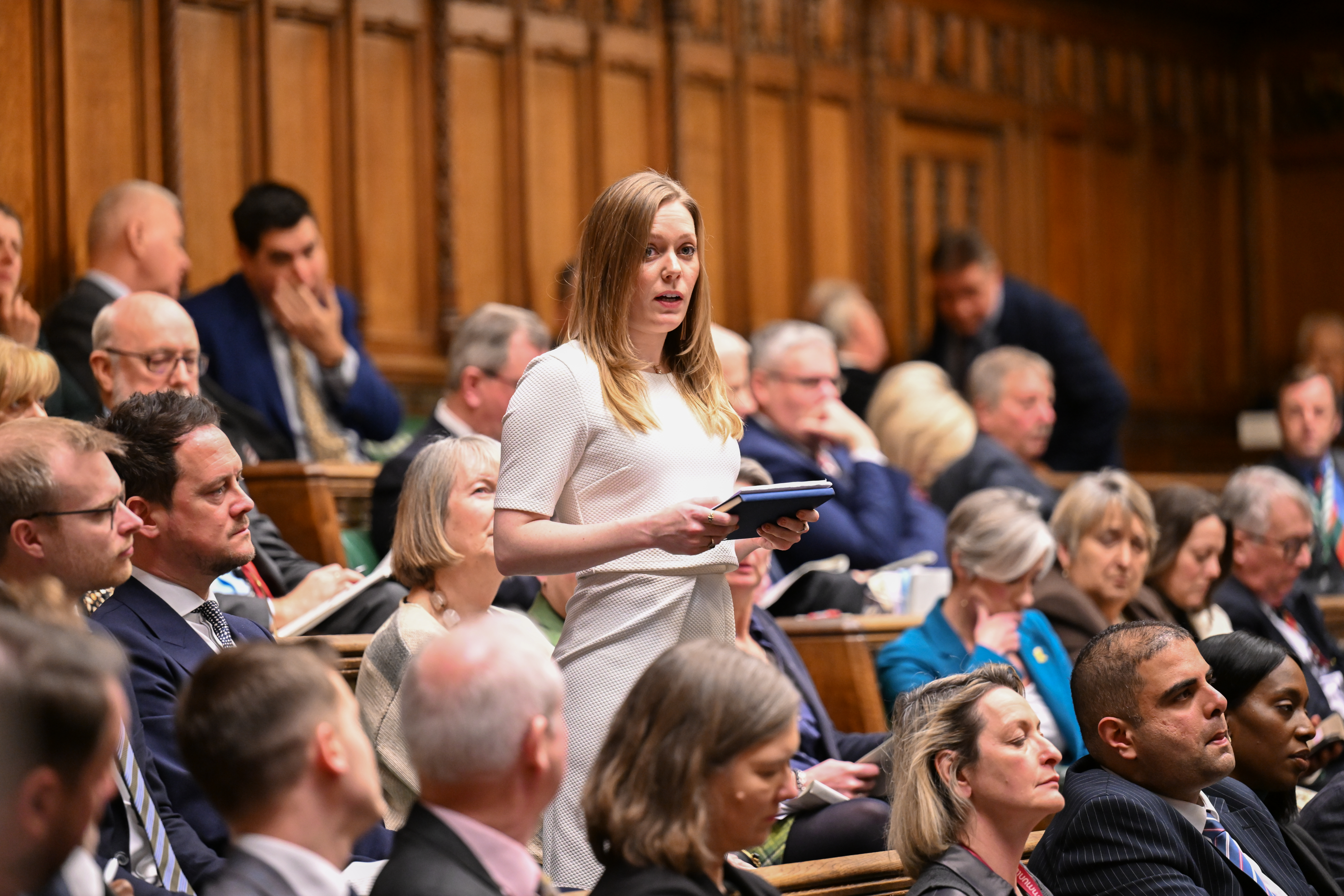
Edwards speaking during Prime Minister's Questions, 7 February 2024

Edwards was elected to represent Tamworth in Parliament at a 2023 by-election, following the resignation of Conservative MP Chris Pincher after a political controversy. She won the seat with 45.8 per cent of the vote and became the first Labour MP for the constituency since the 2010 general election. Her 11,719 votes gave her a majority of 1,316 over the Conservative candidate's 10,403; seven other candidates won between 1,373 and 86 votes.

In her victory speech, Edwards said the people of Tamworth had "voted for Labour's positive vision" and sent a clear message to Prime Minister Rishi Sunak and the government that it was "time for change". The swing from the Conservatives to Labour was 23.9 per cent, the second-highest-ever swing to Labour at a by-election. Political commentator Sir John Curtice said that no government had lost a seat as safe as Tamworth. At the 2024 election she was re-elected, defeating Conservative Eddie Hughes who stood in the seat having previously served as Member of Parliament for Walsall North.

On 30 July Edwards posted a video on social media of a speech she made on 17 July regarding the use of a Holiday Inn Express in her constituency to house asylum seekers, stating that residents of Tamworth "want their hotel back". The hotel was subsequently violently attacked during rioting, sustaining significant damage. The Birmingham Mail reported that Edwards was facing criticism and calls to resign, while a member of Labour's National Executive Committee, Mish Rahman, accused Edwards of "incitement".

In November 2024, Edwards voted in favour of the Terminally Ill Adults (End of Life) Bill, which proposes to legalise assisted suicide.

Parliament of the United Kingdom
Preceded by Chris Pincher	Member of Parliament for Tamworth; 2023–present	Incumbent
