= Owain Williams (rugby union) =

Welsh rugby union player (died 2021)

- Full name: Owain Llewelyn Williams
- Born: 10 October 1964 Ogmore-by-Sea, Wales
- Died: 12 September 2021 (aged 56)
- Height: 198 cm (6 ft 6 in)
- Weight: 121 kg (267 lb)
- School: Brynteg School
- Notable relative(s): Gareth Williams (brother), Teddy Williams (son)

Rugby union career
- Position: Back row
Amateur team(s)
Years	Team	Apps	(Points)
- Glamorgan Wanderers
1988	Wests Rugby		
1988–1992	Bridgend Ravens		
1992–2001	Cardiff RFC		
International career
Years	Team	Apps	(Points)
1990	Wales	1	(0)

Owain Llewelyn Williams (10 October 1964 – 12 September 2021) was a Welsh rugby union player who played as a back row forward for Glamorgan Wanderers, Bridgend, and Cardiff, and the national team. He was the brother of Gareth Williams. He played for Cardiff 221 times, and in the course of his career was in two Welsh Cup-winning sides and also appeared in the inaugural Heineken Cup. He had four children, two of whom, Teddy and Henri, are also rugby players.

After his career in rugby, Williams became a production designer for film and television, namely for the BBC medical drama Casualty.

In 2006 Williams received eye surgery as a result of suffering from cancer.

He died at age 56 from cancer in 2021.
