= Matt Arnold (journalist) =

British journalist & TV presenter

Matthew Fergus Arnold is a British journalist and television presenter who has worked for HTV, GMTV, Sky News, and the BBC.

== Life ==
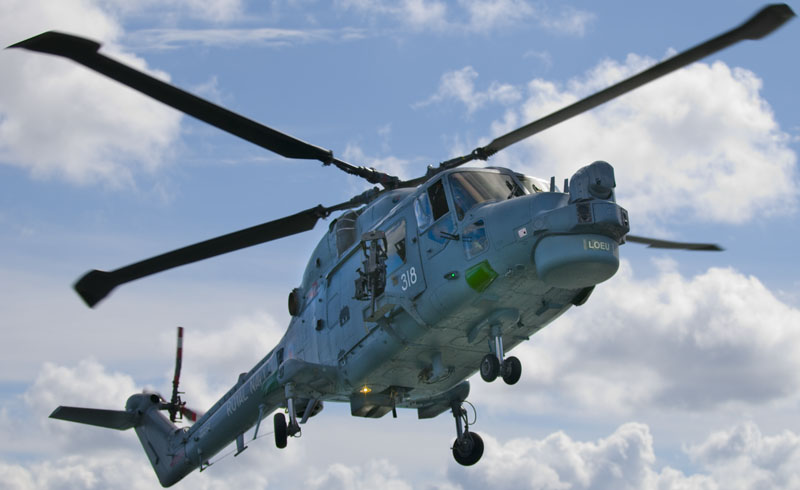
A Royal Navy Lynx helicopter

Born in Derry, Northern Ireland, Arnold attended Gresham's School from 1975 to 1980. He then travelled around the world for a few years, before being commissioned into the Royal Navy in 1986 as an Aircrew Officer, flying in Lynx helicopters. After five years his time in the Navy came to an end, and in 1991 he was hired as a runner on the ITV daytime game show Talk About, before studying for a career in journalism at Highbury College in Hampshire.

In 1993 Capital Radio gave Arnold a job with its show Flying Eye, and for two years he advised Londoners on traffic problems. In 1995 Arnold was one of the first presenters on the new cable television channel L!VE TV, as sports and showbusiness reporter. In 1996 he joined HTV as a sports presenter, moving on to become an HTV news presenter. From there he joined Sky News, then in 2003 became GMTV's Northern Correspondent. GMTV transferred him to London in 2007, and he stayed with it until GMTV was ended by ITV in 2010.

In 1999, Arnold and his wife were living in Battersea. After the end of GMTV they moved to Cambridgeshire. Arnold now runs a family hotel business in Suffolk, with it winning the hit Channel Four show Four in a Bed in 2015.
