= St Teilo's Church in Wales High School =

Secondary school in Cardiff, Wales

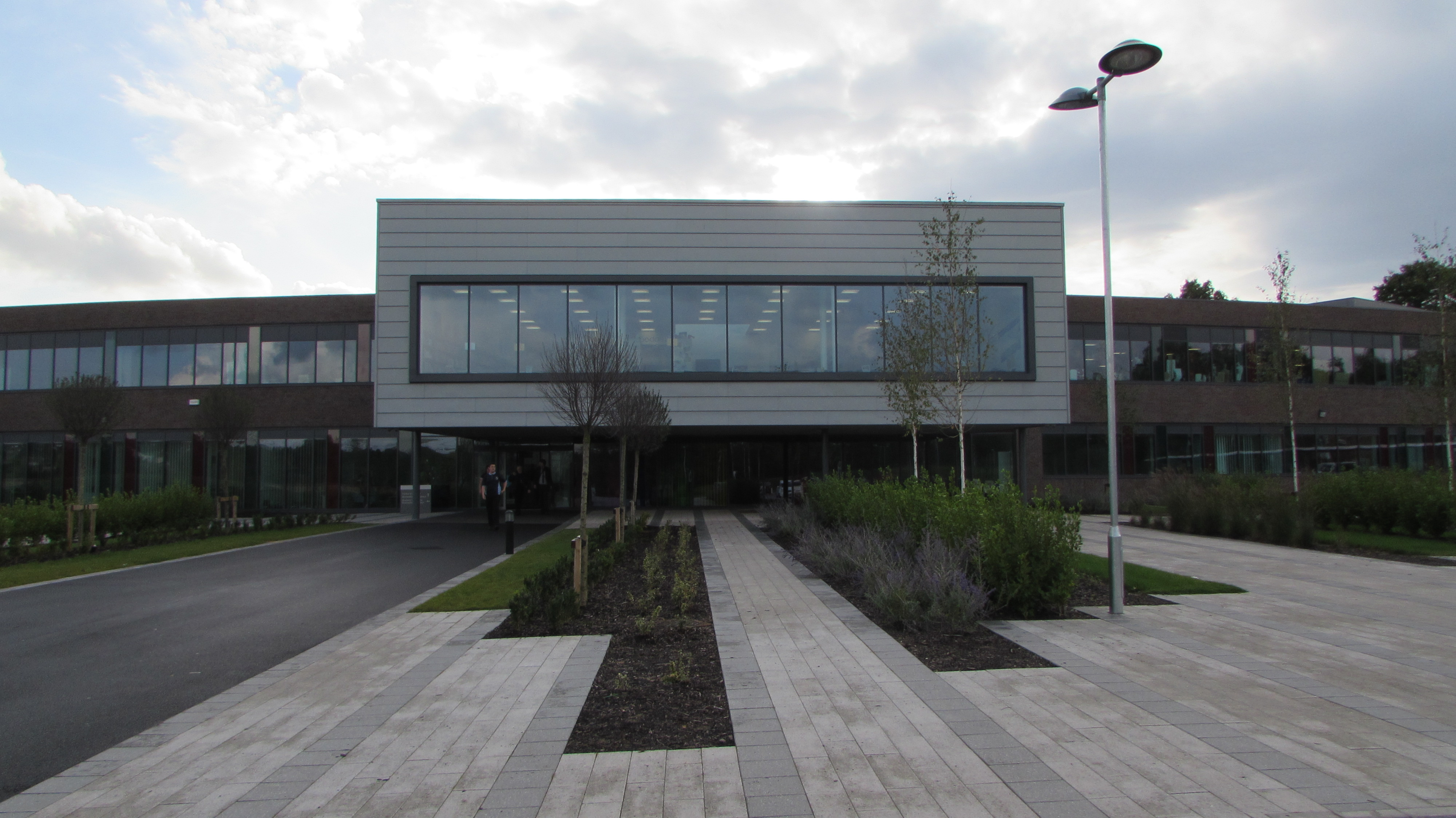
- New school building opened in 2013

Location
- St Teilo's Church in Wales High School; Circle Way East; Llanedeyrn; Cardiff; CF23 9PD; Cardiff, Wales; United Kingdom; 51.50454°N 3.15563°W

Information
- Type: State (magnet) secondary
- Motto: Education with Care
- Established: 1966
- Head teacher: Ian Loynd
- Faculty: 80
- Age: 11 to 16
- Enrollment: 1440
- Colours: Navy, black and yellow
- Website: www.stteilos.com

St Teilo's Church in Wales High School (Welsh: Ysgol Uwchradd Teilo Sant yr Eglwys yng Nghymru) is a co-educational secondary school in Llanedeyrn, Cardiff.

== History ==
The school was opened in September 1966 on its former Llanedeyrn Road, Cyncoed site as an 11-16 school and provides a church school comprehensive education for secondary students living mainly in the eastern half of Cardiff. It is now one of three Voluntary Aided Secondary Schools in the Diocese of Llandaff and serves a much wider geographical and spiritual 'catchment' area; many students come from the Diocese of Monmouth and as far away as Caerphilly. As a Voluntary Aided school, the Local Education Authority maintains it, but the Church through its Governing Body, has considerable spiritual, financial, administrative, and educational duties towards it. The teaching staff are appointed by the Governing Body and have a responsibility to ensure that the curriculum and general life of the school is maintained through a sound Christian foundation.

The school moved to a new building located on the former playing fields of Llanedeyrn High School in September 2013, after Llanedeyrn High School closed.

Today, the school accommodates around 1400 Christian, faith and non-faith pupils between the ages of 11 and 18, with year groups 7 to 11 and an optional sixth form (year groups 12 and 13).

In 2015 the school created controversy when they demanded that pupils provide a doctor's note to be allowed to use the lavatory during lesson periods.

In June 2019, it was announced that headteacher, Ceri Weatherall, would step down from her post, and that current deputy headteacher, Ian Loynd, would take up the role from September 2019.

=== New building ===
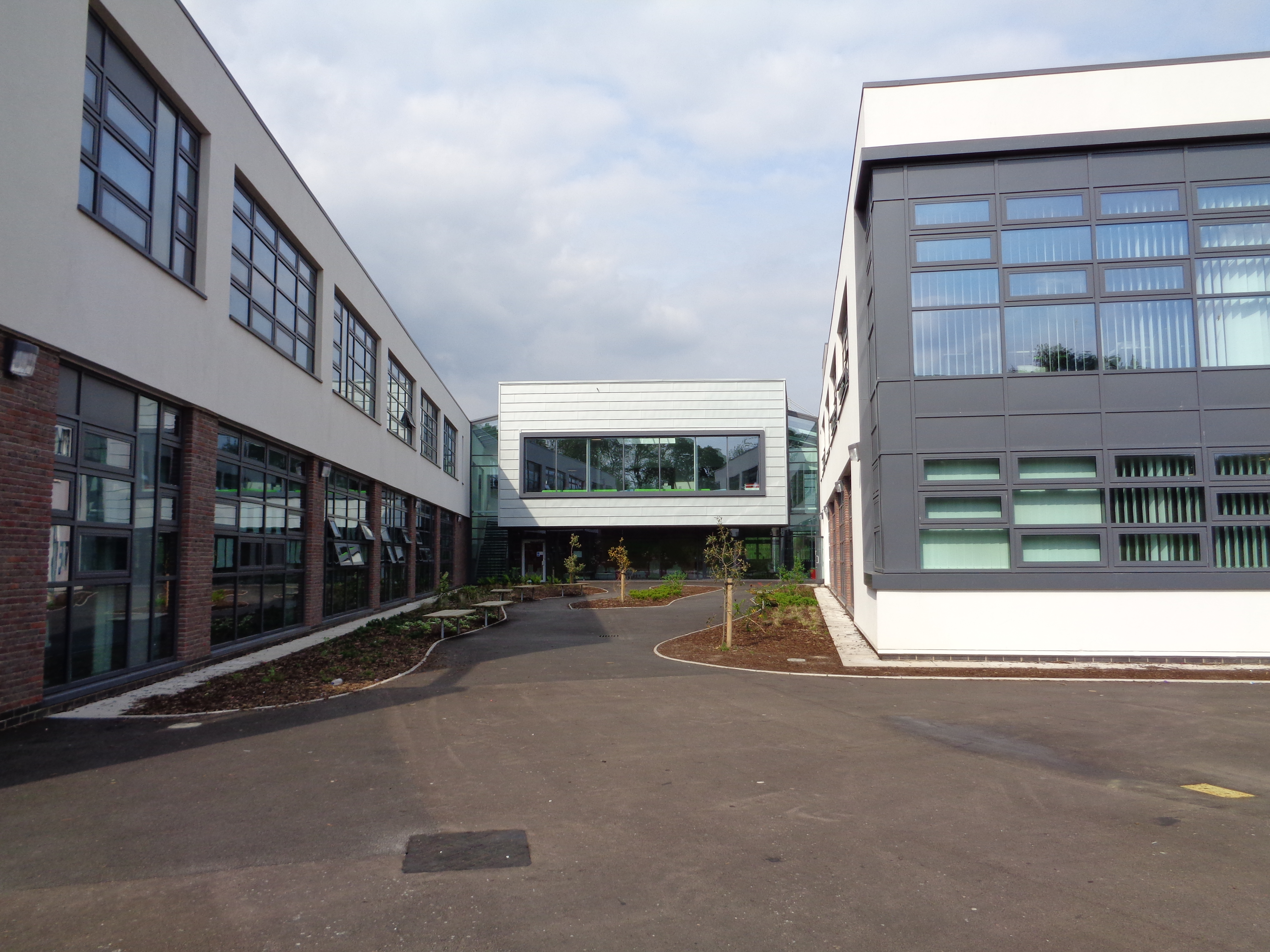
The exterior of the new building.

In September 2013, St Teilo's High School officially moved from its location on Llanedeyrn Road to the playing fields of Llanedeyrn High School, with the former site becoming the home of Ysgol Gyfun Gymraeg Bro Edern. The new school was designed by architects Austin-Smith:Lord in a 'five finger' design, to accommodate over 1400 pupils. The school has a curved design which acts as a sound barrier against the noise pollution caused by the large volume of traffic on the nearby A48 road. However, air pollution is an issue due to the school's close proximity to the A48.

The school has 97 full-size classrooms, of which 8 are ICT computing suites. As part of the new building, a biometric payment system was introduced. Students can now pay for lunch using their fingerprint and load money onto their account via ParentPay, as well as being able to print using their biometrics through PCounter Secure Printing. A deal was also reached with the local Sony UK Technology Centre in Pencoed to provide digital signage services, projectors and video recording facilities for the school. The school was built in 5 stages, the last stages including the construction of the MUGA, 3G pitch and football and rugby playing fields.

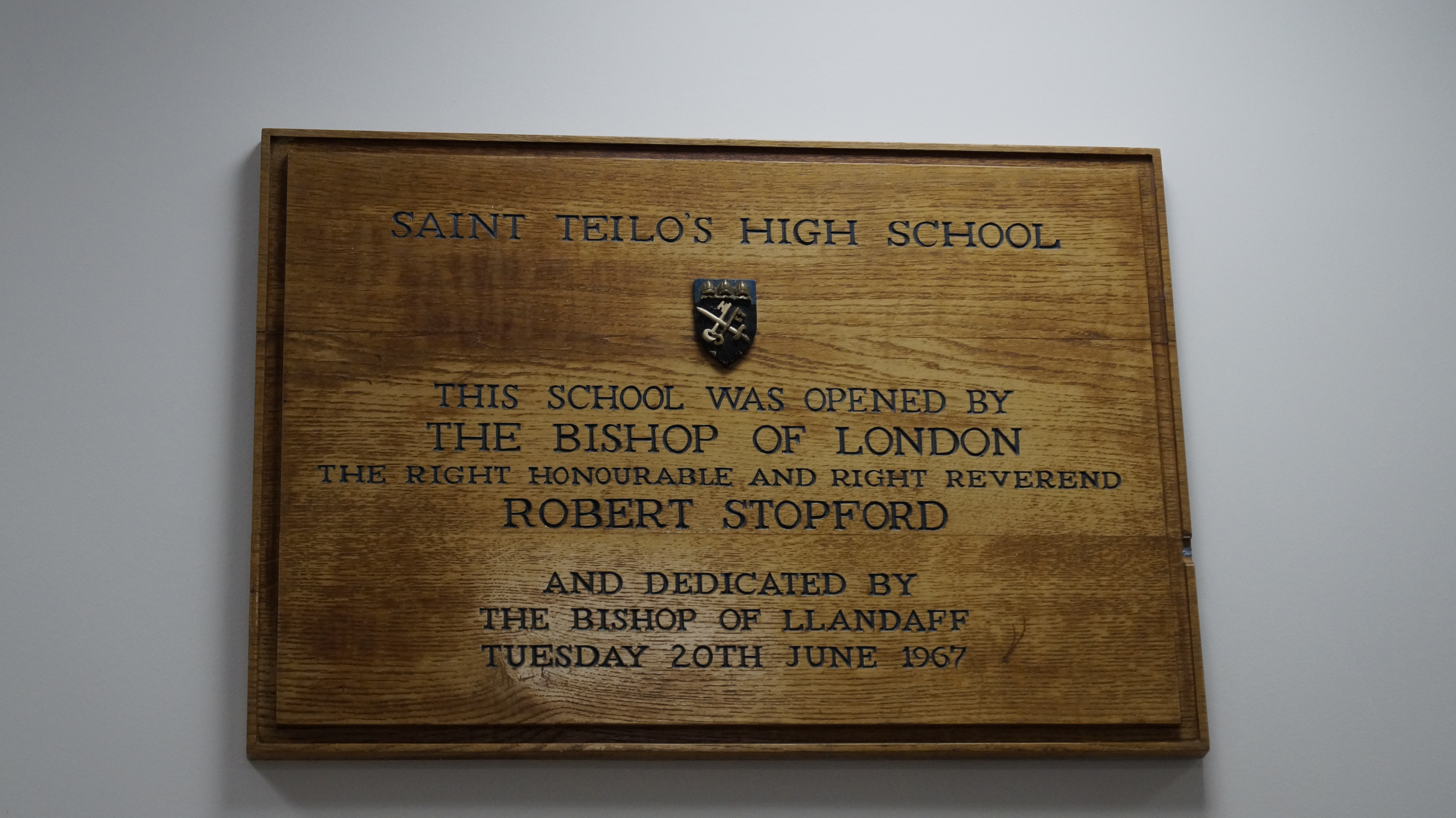
Plaque referencing the opening of the original Llanedeyrn Road building.

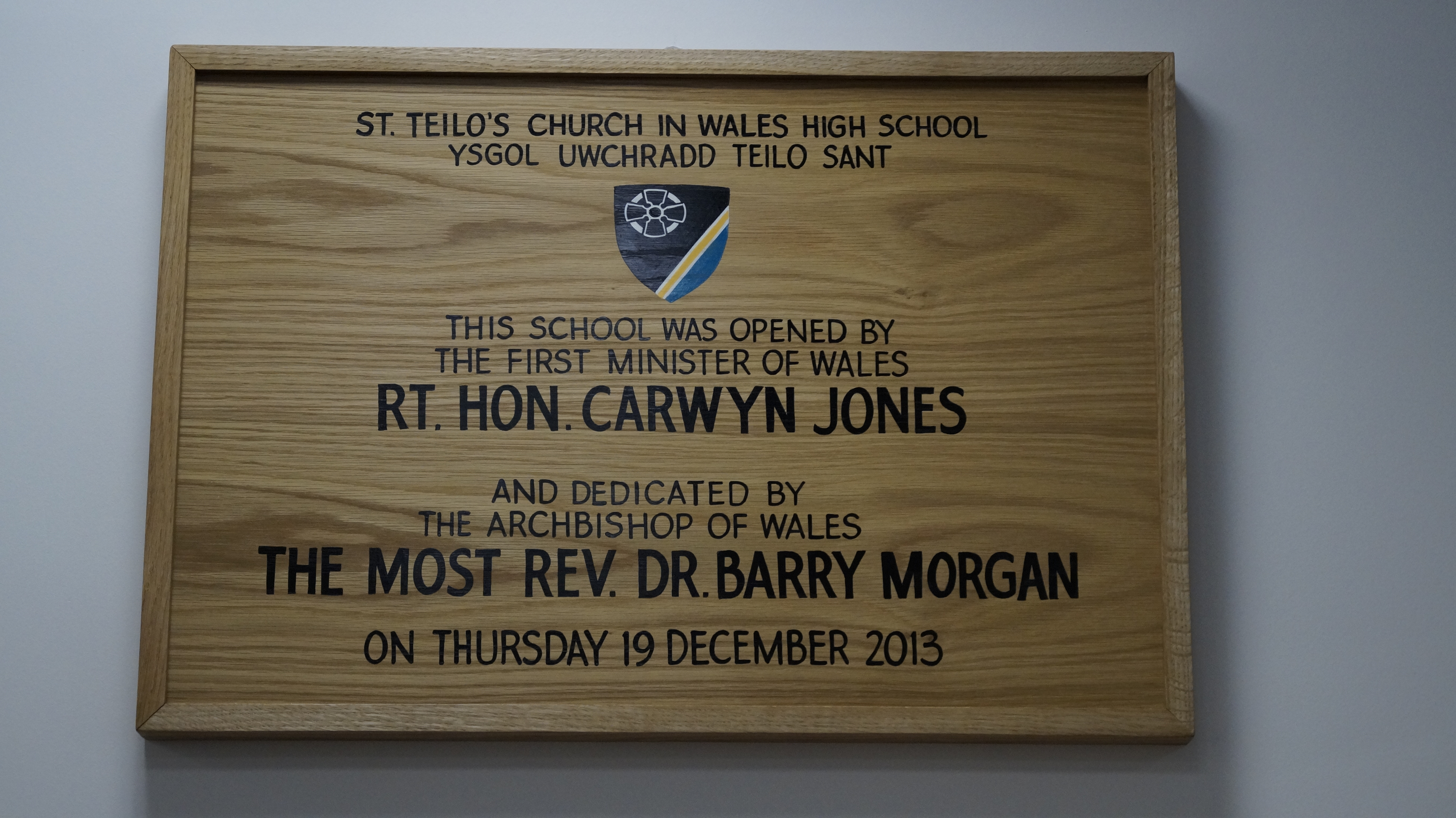
Plaque commemorating the official opening of the new building in 2013.
