= David Lightbown =

British politician (1932–1995)

Sir David Lightbown MP

Comptroller of the Household
- In office 28 November 1990 – 12 December 1995
- Prime Minister: John Major
- Preceded by: Tony Durant
- Succeeded by: Timothy Wood

Vice-Chamberlain of the Household
- In office 25 July 1990 – 28 November 1990
- Prime Minister: Margaret Thatcher
- Preceded by: Tony Durant
- Succeeded by: John Taylor

Lord Commissioner of the Treasury
- In office 26 July 1987 – 25 July 1990
- Prime Minister: Margaret Thatcher
- Preceded by: Second Thatcher ministry
- Succeeded by: Irvine Patnick

Member of Parliament for South East Staffordshire
- In office 9 June 1983 – 12 December 1995
- Preceded by: Constituency created
- Succeeded by: Brian Jenkins

Personal details
- Born: 30 November 1932 Derby, England
- Died: 12 December 1995 (aged 63) London, England
- Spouse: Ann Palmer (m. 1960)
- Education: Derby Technical College

Sir David Lincoln Lightbown (30 November 1932 – 12 December 1995) was a British politician who was the Conservative Member of Parliament for South East Staffordshire from 1983 until his death.

== Background ==
Lightbown was born Derby in 1932, and attended the Derby School and Derby Technical College. He was an engineering executive who had an adversarial relationship with the Transport and General Workers' Union.

== Political career ==
Lightbown was elected to the Lichfield District Council in 1975, and served as its leader from 1977 to 1986. In 1977, he was also elected to the Staffordshire County Council, where he served until 1985. He entered Parliament in 1983. He served as a government whip, and his imposing physique and reputation for robust methods led to him being branded "the Terminator".

Lightbown held right-wing views, endorsing capital punishment and advertising on the BBC, as well as supporting England's 1984 rugby union tour of South Africa under apartheid. He opposed the ordination of divorced men in the Church of England.

== Personal life and death ==
Lightbown married Ann Palmer in 1960. On 12 December 1995, he was watching The Varsity Match at Twickenham Stadium, when he collapsed and died at the age of 63. The resulting by-election for his seat was won by the Labour Party candidate Brian Jenkins.

His widow, Lady Lightbown, contested his successor seat of Tamworth at the 1997 general election but was defeated by Brian Jenkins.

Parliament of the United Kingdom
New constituency	Member of Parliament for South East Staffordshire; 1983–1995	Succeeded by Brian Jenkins
Political offices
Preceded by Tony Durant	Vice-Chamberlain of the Household; 1990	Succeeded by John Mark Taylor
Preceded by Sir George Young, Bt	Comptroller of the Household; 1990–1995	Succeeded by Timothy Wood
