= Jenny Ogwen =

Welsh actress and presenter

- Born: Llandybie, Carmarthenshire, Wales
- Occupations: Actress; Presenter
- Spouse: Euryn Ogwen Williams
- Children: Rhodri Williams

Jenny Ogwen is a Welsh former actress and presenter. She is best known as a weather presenter on the Welsh-language channel S4C.

== Biography ==
=== Early life ===
Ogwen was born in Llandybie, in Carmarthenshire. Her family moved to Crymych in Pembrokeshire when she was two years old. In her teenage years she was crowned Miss Pembrokeshire 1961 and won the title of Miss Norvic Teenager of the Year in London. She left school at the age of 16 and went to London to be trained as a secretary the following year. She moved back to Wales when she was 19.

=== Career ===
Her first job was working as a secretary for the media news programme The Day. Ogwen later went to present the program Siôn a Siân during the 1960s and children's shows as well as acting in Now You're Talking, a television series for learners. She was a presenter on HTV Wales and later moved to S4C in 1992 as a continuity announcer and presented weather bulletins. Ogwen retired as a weather presenter in August 2004 and was replaced by Erin Roberts.

Her family are also involved in the media. Her husband Euryn Ogwen Williams has been working in the media since the 1960s. Her son Rhodri Williams works with Sky Sports in London and on S4C on programs like Y Clwb Rygbi and Pacio. She is the mother of Sara, who presents on S4C, and she is also grandmother to her daughter, Sophia, who played Catherine Bennett in Pobol y Cwm.

== Bibliography ==
- Jenny Ogwen (October 2007). Glaw a Hindda. Llandysul: Gomer Press. ISBN 9781843238850.
