= National Democrats (United Kingdom) =

British nationalist party

National Democrats (UK)
- Abbreviation: ND
- Chairman: Ian Anderson
- Founded: 1995
- Dissolved: 2011
- Preceded by: National Front (Flag Group)
- Ideology: British nationalism Right-wing populism Third Position; Euroscepticism; National conservatism
- Political position: Far-right

National Democrats logo

The National Democrats (ND) was a British nationalist party in the United Kingdom (UK). The former party chairman, Ian Anderson, died on 2 February 2011, and the party was de-registered with the Electoral Commission on 10 March 2011.

== Formation ==
The party evolved out of the Flag Group wing of the British National Front (NF), which gained control of the NF during the early 1990s. Party leader Ian Anderson sought to change the name of the NF to the National Democrats. 72% of the membership voted for the change in a postal ballot; by changing the name it was hoped to avoid the connotations associated with the NF name. However, the move was resisted by other NF members and so the National Democrats came into existence as a new party.

== History ==
The party contested two parliamentary by-elections in 1996. In Hemsworth, Mike Cooper received 111 votes (0.5%) and, in South East Staffordshire, Sharron Edwards received 358 votes (0.8%). Although the NDs never took part in regularly scheduled European elections, it did contest the Merseyside West by-election in which Simon Darby stood but only gained 718 votes (1.2%).

In the 1997 general election, the party contested 21 seats and received a total of 10,829 votes, compared to 35,832 for its rivals in the British National Party (BNP), and 2,719 votes for the NF. The party's best result was in West Bromwich West, where Steven Edwards received 11.4% of the vote. However, this was not a normal constituency, since this was the constituency of then House Speaker Betty Boothroyd, which major parties by convention do not contest. The party was severely damaged immediately before the 1997 election when it was revealed by The Sunday Times and the Daily Mail that leading member Andy Carmichael was working for MI5. Where the West Midlands had been a stronghold, it now began to fall apart, and in 1998, the local branch, which included leading ND activist Simon Darby, defected to the BNP, leaving only a small number of party loyalists behind. The party did not nominate candidates in the 2001 general election.

In the early 1990s, the National Front was left a legacy of almost one hundred thousand pounds by a party supporter. Following the 1995 name change to the National Democrats the legacy remained with the National Democrats under the control of Ian Anderson. The money was spent on the purchase of Britannia House – the building doubled as party HQ and the site of Anderson's printing business.

The National Democrats attempted to give the impression of attracting a mass membership. It never did; most people who left the NF joined the BNP instead, resulting in the legacy being used for election work and costly deposits, all of which were lost. The party printed a glossy monthly magazine called Vanguard that was edited by Blackburn-based Stephen Ebbs which lost money on every print and was subsidised by legacy cash. Publication of the former NF paper, The Flag, continued, now in support of the new party.

== Anti-paedophile campaign ==
In January 1998, Ian Anderson accompanied members of the anti-paedophile campaign People Power when they delivered a letter to Downing Street demanding tougher action against child abusers. Also in attendance were other extreme right wingers, including Paul Ballard of the BNP and Bill Binding, exposed by Searchlight as a leader of the British branch of the Ku Klux Klan and a former BNP parliamentary candidate. A plan to hand out extreme right-wing literature was abandoned when Curtis Sliwa, leader of the Guardian Angels vigilante group, turned up with members, some of whom were non-white. People Power's literature was produced by Ian Anderson, from his printing business in Dagenham.

Following this, the National Democrats set up a website called Paedophile Watch to "out" suspected child abusers with leaflets and demonstrations. The site also listed newspaper reports containing the names and addresses of convicted sex offenders. Reporters from the News of the World sought information from Ian Anderson for their "name and shame" stunt.

== Change in activities ==
Campaign for National Democracy
- Formation: ?
- President: Ian Anderson

By 2000, the National Democrats had ceased to exist with only the Flag newspaper being published as an independent publication, without reference to the National Democrats or the Campaign for National Democracy.

By the beginning of 2002, the party continued as a pressure group under the name Campaign for National Democracy; until 2008. The party officially ceased to exist after the death of its leader at the beginning of 2011.

== Leading members ==
- Simon Darby, parliamentary candidate, left the party in 1998 for the BNP and became its press officer and deputy leader.
- Martin Wingfield, co-editor of The Flag, left the party in 2001 and joined the BNP and became editor of its Voice of Freedom paper.
- Sharron Edwards, parliamentary candidate, left the party in 1999, stood as first candidate on the West Midlands list for the BNP in the 1999 European elections and later became deputy chairwoman of the BNP before helping to form the Freedom Party.

== Parliamentary election results ==
=== 1996-1997 by-elections ===
Date of election	Constituency	Candidate	Votes	%
1 February 1996	Hemsworth	M Cooper	111	0.5
11 April 1996	South East Staffordshire	Mrs S Edwards	358	0.8
12 December 1996	Merseyside West (European Parliament)	Simon Darby	718	1.2

=== 1997 general election ===
The party contested 21 seats, receiving a total of 10,829 votes (less than 0.1% of the total). No candidates were elected, and the party lost all but one of its deposits.

Constituency	Candidate	Votes	%
Birmingham Ladywood	Andrew Carmichael	685	1.8
Blackburn	Tina Wingfield	671	1.4
Burton	Keith Sharp	604	1.1
Dagenham	Michael Hipperson	183	0.5
Derby South	Robert Evans	317	0.6
Devon East	Gary Needs	131	0.2
Dudley North	Simon Darby	469	1
East Ham	Graham Hardy	290	0.7
East Yorkshire	Michael Cooper	381	0.8
Halesowen and Rowley Regis	Karen Needs	592	1.2
Leicester South	Kevin Sills	307	0.6
Leicester West	Clive Potter	186	0.5
Londonderry East	Ian Anderson	81	0.2
Nottingham South	Sharron Edwards	446	0.9
Plymouth Devonport	Stephen Ebbs	238	0.5
Southport	Michael Middleton	92	0.2
Southwark North and Bermondsey	Ingga Yngvisson	95	0.2
Stoke-on-Trent South	Brian Lawrence	288	0.6
Tiverton and Honiton	Del Charles	236	0.4
West Bromwich West	Steven Edwards	4,181	11.4*
Wolverhampton North East	Martin Wingfield	356	0.9

* West Bromwich West was the Speaker's seat and was not contested by the major parties. The candidates were Betty Boothroyd (Speaker, 54.8%), Richard Silvester (Independent, 23.3) and Steven Edwards (ND, 11.4%)

=== 1997-99 by-elections ===
Date of election	Constituency	Candidate	Votes	%
31 July 1997	Uxbridge	Ian Anderson	157	0.5
23 September 1999	Wigan	S Ebbs	100	0.6

== See also ==
- Political party
- Politics of the United Kingdom
- Lists of political parties
