= Rhodri Williams =

Welsh sports journalist and presenter

Rhodri Ogwen Williams (born 10 May 1968) is a Welsh sports journalist from Barry, Vale of Glamorgan, Wales. He is currently employed by Qatar's Al-Kass Sports Channel and anchors the network's English-speaking studio.

== TV career ==
In 1995, Williams was the first presenter on L!VE TV and presented the station's morning show until its revamp later in the year. He stayed with the station, presenting its talent show, Spanish Archer and in 1997, he was the quizmaster on L!VE TV's football quiz A Game of Two Scarves featuring fans and glamour models.

Williams was a main presenter for Sky Sports News and was one of Sky Sports' main rugby presenters, hosting the Heineken Cup and Southern Hemisphere rugby including the Tri Nations, the National Provincial Championship in New Zealand and the Currie Cup in South Africa. He was sacked by Sky Sports in 2006 after tabloid revelations regarding his personal life.

Williams was part of the launch of Channel 5 in the UK as one of the presenters of the channel's afternoon entertainment show 5's Company with Nick Knowles and John Barrowman. He has presented numerous programmes for the Welsh language channel S4C, and also presented Animal Hospital with Rolf Harris. In 2001, Williams appeared on Lily Savage's Blankety Blank.

He was the main rugby presenter for Setanta Sports and hosted various shows on Setanta Sports News. Williams presented ITV Wales' coverage of the 2007 Rugby World Cup.

In 2008, Williams was contracted by Al Jazeera Sports with whom he covered the 2008 Beijing Olympics and the 2011 AFC Asian Cup. He also presented the 2012 Al Kass International Cup. Later that year, he was hired full-time by Al Kass Sports Channel to host a segment known as QSL Review in an attempt to provide coverage of the Qatar Stars League to non-Arabic speakers.

== Radio ==
Williams has been a presenter on national radio sports station Talksport, presenting the Kick-off programme on Thursday from 19:00 to 22:00 and The Sunday Session.

He has also presented radio shows for BBC Radio Wales and Radio Cymru.

== Personal life ==
Williams is the son of the Welsh TV (S4C) weather presenter Jenny Ogwen. He was educated at Ysgol Gyfun Gymraeg Glantaf and South Glamorgan Institute of Higher Education.
