= Suzanne Packer =

Welsh actress (born 1962)

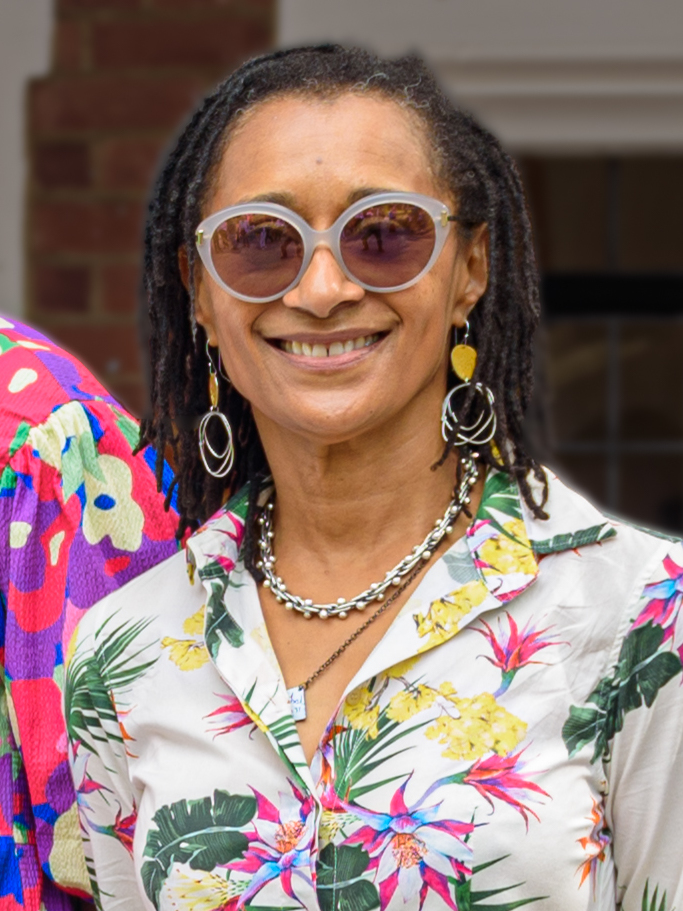
- Packer in 2021
- Born: Suzanne Jackson; 26 November 1962 (age 63); Cardiff, Wales
- Education: Llanedeyrn High School; Webber Douglas Academy of Dramatic Art
- Alma mater: University of Warwick
- Occupation: Actress
- Years active: 1990–present
- Spouse: Jesse Newman (divorced)
- Children: 1
- Relatives: Colin Jackson (brother)

Suzanne Packer (born Suzanne Jackson on 26 November 1962) is a Welsh actress, known for playing the role of Tess Bateman in the BBC medical drama Casualty from September 2003 to August 2015. She later returned to the series as a guest for the 30th-anniversary episodes in 2016. Since departing from Casualty, she has appeared in various television series including Bang, In My Skin and The Pembrokeshire Murders.

Packer presenting St David Awards on behalf of the Welsh Government in 2015

== Early life ==
Packer is the daughter of Jamaican immigrant parents who moved to Abergavenny, Wales, where her mother Angela worked as a nurse. She is the older sister of the hurdler Colin Jackson.

While studying at Llanedeyrn High School in Cardiff, she showed an interest in acting, playing the lead in school plays including Oklahoma and The King and I. Packer attended the National Youth Theatre of Wales before earning a BA in theatre and drama at the University of Warwick. She then trained at the Webber Douglas Academy of Dramatic Art in London. Prior to acting professionally, Packer worked as a drama supply teacher, having earned a PGCE. After working at one particular school for three months, she was offered a permanent contract, which she declined due to wanting to pursue acting full-time.

== Career ==
Her first major role was as Josie Johnson in Brookside from 1990 to 1991, with guest stints in 1993 and 2000.

In 1991, Packer co-founded BiBi Crew, Britain's first comedy theatre troupe made up entirely of Black women. After she gained an audition for the BBC drama Casualty and was cast as Tess Bateman, she began appearing onscreen from September 2003. On 22 August 2015, she announced her decision to leave Casualty after playing the character of Tess for over 11 years.

Packer appeared with her brother Colin on the first series of Pointless Celebrities on 6 July 2011. They were eliminated in the first round. In 2018, she began portraying the role of Nurse Digby in the BBC Three series In My Skin. On 4 November 2018, Packer played Eve Cicero in the Doctor Who episode, "The Tsuranga Conundrum". In 2021, she starred in the ITV miniseries The Pembrokeshire Murders.

In 2021, Packer co-edited with Suzette Llewellyn an essay collection, Still Breathing: 100 Black Voices on Racism - 100 Ways to Change the Narrative, published by Harper Collins. In addition to the editors' own essays, the book also included contributions from other prominent Black British individuals in a variety of different fields, including MPs David Lammy and Dawn Butler, actor Sharon D. Clarke, and singer Beverley Knight. In 2025, Packer and Llewellyn launched their podcast Verandah Talk, where they reconnect with contributors of their book and continue the discussions of racism in Britain.

== Personal life ==
Packer met American actor Jesse Newman while on a tour in Europe, and the pair later married, and had a son together. The pair divorced.

== Filmography ==
Year	Title	Role	Channel	Notes
1990–1991; 1993; 2000	Brookside	Josie Johnson/Brooks	Channel 4	Series regular; 96 episodes
1992	Crime Story	Barbara Pilkington	ITV	Episode: "All Good Friends"
1994	The Lifeboat	Helen Mitchell	Unknown	Episode: "Shadow of Doubt"
1995	Grange Hill	Miss Foster	BBC	2 episodes
1995	Some Kind of Life	Dr. Judson	Unknown	
1996	Wales Playhouse	Veronica	BBC Wales	Episode: "Strangers in the Night"
1996	Porkpie	Trish	Channel 4	Episode: "Fatal Distraction"
1996	Casualty	Candice Francis	BBC1	Episode “Trapped”
1997	Tiger Bay	Marie	Unknown	4 episodes
1998	Brothers and Sisters	Siobhan Etienne	Unknown	
1999	The Bill	Katherine Adams	ITV	Episode: "Treading Water"
2000	Dirty Work	Rhiannon	Unknown	6 episodes
2002	Third Watch	Dr. Sharon Reid	NBC	Episode: "The Greater Good"
2003–2015, 2016, 2021	Casualty	Tess Bateman	BBC	Series regular; 487 episodes
2004–2005	Holby City	Tess Bateman	BBC	2 episodes
2005	Casualty @ Holby City	Tess Bateman	BBC	3 episodes
2014	Under Milk Wood	Mrs. Beynon	BBC	Television film
2015	Doctors	Rose Blair	BBC	Episode: "The Heart of England"
2016	Stella	Carol	Sky 1	Series 5
2016	The Level	Teresa Devlin	ITV	Recurring role
2017	Vera	Sophia	ITV	Episode: "Natural Selection"
2017	Bang	Layla	S4C/BBC	Main role
2017, 2019, 2021	Un Bore Mercher / Keeping Faith	Delyth Lloyd	S4C/BBC	Main role
2018	Death in Paradise	Maya Oprey	BBC	1 episode
2018	Hold the Sunset	Mrs. Pool	BBC	Episode: "Roger the Carer"
2018	Doctor Who	Eve Cicero	BBC	Episode: "The Tsuranga Conundrum"
2018	The ABC Murders	Capstick	BBC	3 episodes
2018–2021	In My Skin	Nurse Digby	BBC Three	Recurring role
2020	Cyswllt (Mewn COVID)	Ruth	S4C	
2021	The Pembrokeshire Murders	Chief Constable Tyler	ITV1	Miniseries
2023	Silent Witness	Miriam Harper	BBC1	s26 Southbay pt1&2
2024	Midsomer Murders	Olivia Dent	ITV	Episode: "Dressed to Kill"
2024	The Night Caller	Rosa	Channel 5	4 episodes
2024	The Bay	Anne Jackson	ITV	Series 5

Packer featured in the 2024 documentary Colin Jackson: Resilience, talking about her upbringing with her brother and his athletics career.

== Awards and honours ==
Year	Award	Category	Work	Result
2006	Screen Nation Awards	Female Performance in television	As Tess Bateman in Casualty	Won
2025	Black British Theatre Awards	Best Female Lead in a Play	As Annie in The Women of Llanrumney at Stratford East and Sherman Theatre	Nominated

== Bibliography ==
- Still Breathing: 100 Black Voices on Racism – 100 Ways to Change the Narrative (co-edited with Suzette Llywellyn). London: HarperCollins, 2021.
