= Teddy Williams (rugby union) =

Welsh rugby union player (born 2000)

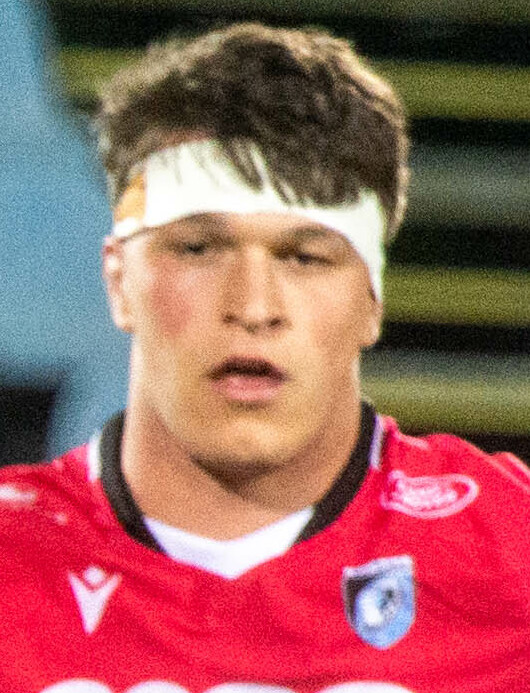
- Williams representing Cardiff during the United Rugby Championship
- Full name: Edward Ioan Williams
- Born: 18 October 2000 (age 26) Cardiff, Wales
- Height: 1.98 m (6 ft 6 in)
- Weight: 118 kg (260 lb; 18 st 8 lb)
- School: Ysgol Gyfun Gymraeg Plasmawr
- Notable relative(s): Owain Williams (father); Gareth Williams (uncle)

Rugby union career
- Position: Lock
- Current team: Cardiff
Senior career
Years	Team	Apps	(Points)
2020–	Cardiff	63	(20)
- Correct as of 18 November 2026
International career
Years	Team	Apps	(Points)
2019	Wales U20	7	(0)
2023–	Wales	6	(0)
- Correct as of 18 November 2026

Teddy Williams (born 18 October 2000) is a Welsh professional rugby union player who plays as a lock for United Rugby Championship club Cardiff and the Wales national team.

== Club career ==
Williams signed his first professional contract for Cardiff in September 2020. He made his Cardiff debut in Round 6 of the 2020–21 Pro14 against Benetton.

Ahead of the 2023–24 United Rugby Championship Williams signed a contract extension with Cardiff.

== International career ==
Williams has represented Wales as a U18 and U20 international.

Williams was called into the Wales national rugby union team squad for the first time in January 2023.

Williams was named in the training squad for the 2023 Rugby World Cup. Williams made his debut on 19 August 2023, coming off the bench against South Africa in the 2023 Rugby World Cup warm-up matches, and received a yellow card. Williams was not named in the final World Cup squad.

Williams came off the bench for Wales in an uncapped match against the Barbarians on 4 November 2023.

== Personal life ==
Williams is the son of Welsh international Owain Williams, and nephew of Gareth Williams.
