= Chris Pincher =

British politician (born 1969)

The Right Honourable Chris Pincher
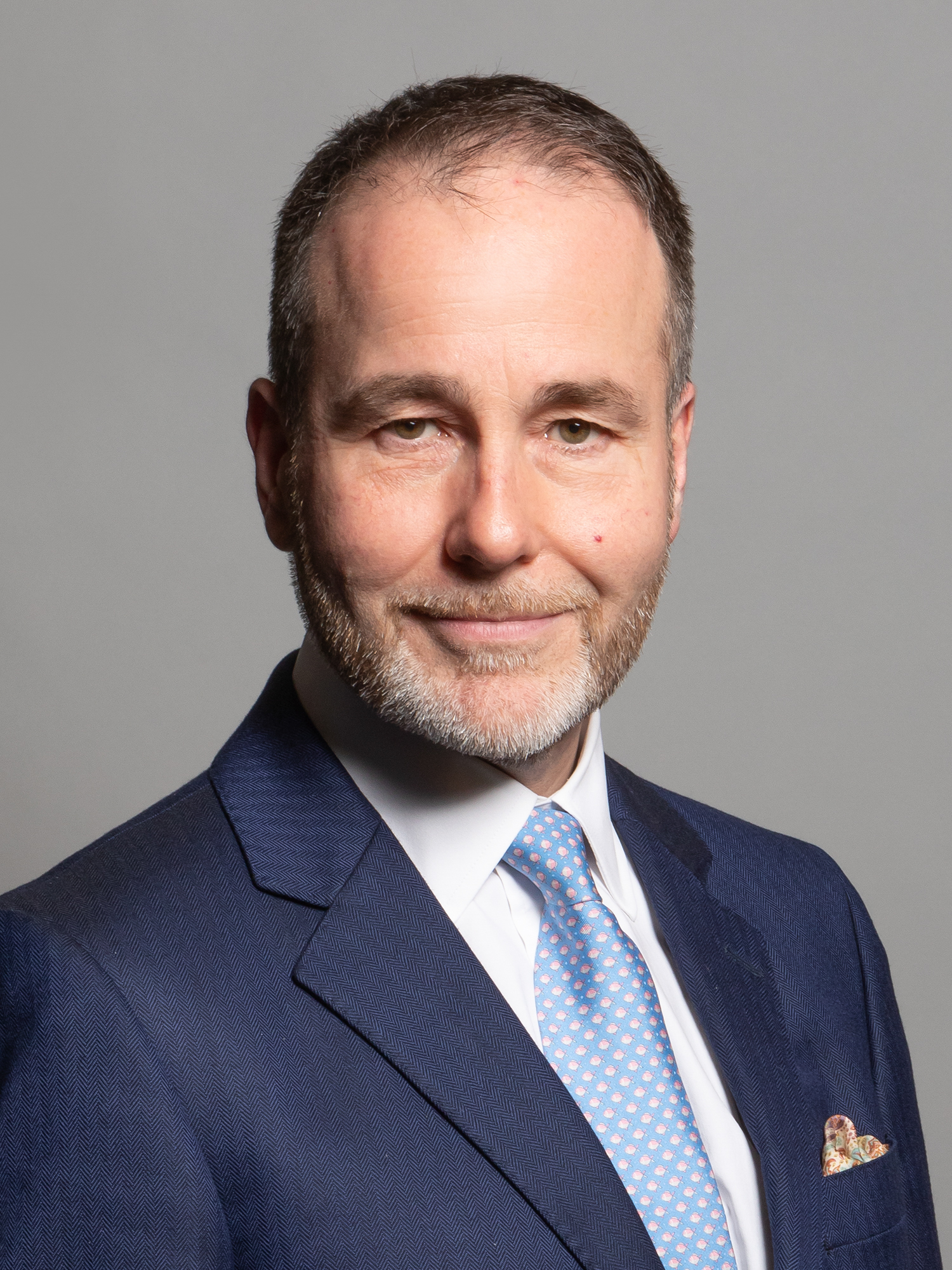
- Official portrait, 2020

Government Deputy Chief Whip Treasurer of the Household
- In office 8 February 2022 – 30 June 2022
- Prime Minister: Boris Johnson
- Preceded by: Stuart Andrew
- Succeeded by: Kelly Tolhurst
- In office 9 January 2018 – 25 July 2019
- Prime Minister: Theresa May
- Preceded by: Esther McVey
- Succeeded by: Amanda Milling

Minister of State for Housing
- In office 13 February 2020 – 8 February 2022
- Prime Minister: Boris Johnson
- Preceded by: Esther McVey
- Succeeded by: Stuart Andrew

Minister of State for Europe and the Americas
- In office 25 July 2019 – 13 February 2020
- Prime Minister: Boris Johnson
- Preceded by: Alan Duncan
- Succeeded by: Wendy Morton

Assistant Whip Comptroller of the Household
- In office 15 June 2017 – 5 November 2017
- Prime Minister: Theresa May
- Preceded by: Mel Stride
- Succeeded by: Chris Heaton-Harris

Member of Parliament for Tamworth
- In office 6 May 2010 – 7 September 2023
- Preceded by: Brian Jenkins
- Succeeded by: Sarah Edwards

Personal details
- Born: Christopher John Pincher; 24 September 1969 (age 56) Walsall, Staffordshire, England
- Party: Independent (since 2022)
- Other party: Conservative (1987–2022)
- Education: Wombourne High School
- Alma mater: London School of Economics (BSc)
- Occupation: IT Consultant

Christopher John Pincher (born 24 September 1969) is a British former politician who served as Member of Parliament (MP) for Tamworth from 2010 until his resignation in 2023. Pincher served as Government Deputy Chief Whip, and Treasurer of the Household from 2018 to 2019 and from February to June 2022.

Pincher was first elected as the Conservative MP for Tamworth at the 2010 general election, when he gained the seat from the Labour Party. He first contested the seat in 2005. He served as a parliamentary private secretary to Foreign Secretary Philip Hammond from 2015 to 2016. Pincher served as an assistant whip and Comptroller of the Household in 2017, before he resigned after being implicated in the 2017 Westminster sexual misconduct allegations, having been accused of sexual misconduct by Tom Blenkinsop and Alex Story. Two months later, in January 2018, he was appointed by Theresa May as Government Deputy Chief Whip and Treasurer of the Household. After Boris Johnson became prime minister in July 2019, Pincher was appointed Minister of State for Europe and the Americas. In the February 2020 cabinet reshuffle, he was appointed Minister of State for Housing. In February 2022, he returned to his former role of Government Deputy Chief Whip and Treasurer of the Household.

After allegedly groping two men while he was drunk, Pincher resigned as Deputy Chief Whip on 30 June 2022, and had the Conservative whip removed. This triggered a scandal over his appointment to the role, as Johnson knew about the allegations but did not dismiss him, leading to a government crisis that ultimately resulted in Johnson's resignation. Pincher continued to sit as an MP for another year, but did not make any further contributions in the House of Commons. Pincher announced in April 2023 that he would stand down at the next UK general election. In its investigation of his conduct, the Commons Select Committee on Standards censured Pincher in a report published on 6 July 2023, labelling his actions profoundly damaging both to the reputation of Parliament and his victims, and an abuse of power. The committee recommended Pincher be suspended from Parliament for eight weeks. On 7 September 2023, he announced his imminent resignation as an MP, which triggered the 2023 Tamworth by-election.

== Early life ==
Pincher was born in Walsall, and grew up in Wombourne, Staffordshire. He has been a member of the Conservative Party since 1987, having been politicised by the 1984–85 miners' strike. He was deputy director of the Conservative Collegiate Forum, followed by chairman of Islington North Constituency Association, the constituency represented by Jeremy Corbyn since 1983. He was tipped as a future cabinet member ahead of the 1997 general election, in which he ran for Parliament for the newly created safe Labour seat of Warley, in Sandwell; he came second, with 24% of the vote.

Pincher was a member of Iain Duncan Smith's successful campaign for the party leadership in 2001. He failed to be elected in 2005 when he first stood for Tamworth, gaining a 2.8% swing from Labour. Although Brian Jenkins retained the seat, Pincher said he had won the arguments, after campaigning for more police and school discipline.

While a candidate, he campaigned against the decision to close Queen Elizabeth's Mercian School, which had been earmarked for closure under Building Schools for the Future, and called the 2009 decision to keep the school open a "victory for people power". He also successfully put pressure on Persimmon to resume and complete construction of the half-built Tame Alloys Estate in Wilnecote.

== Member of Parliament ==
Pincher was re-selected to contest Tamworth for the 2010 election, gaining the seat on a 9.5% swing, taking him to 45.8% of the vote and a majority of 6,090 or 13.1%, over Brian Jenkins. Pincher made his Maiden Speech in the Commons in June 2010 In his first 10 months as an MP, Pincher had the second-highest House of Commons attendance rate of the West Midlands' 57 MPs, after James Morris. In his first year, he spoke in 94 debates; top amongst Staffordshire's 11 MPs.

Pincher voted in favour of the Marriage (Same Sex Couples) Act 2013, which legalised same-sex marriage in England and Wales.

Pincher campaigned against the building of High Speed 2, which is planned to run past the outskirts of Tamworth. He has defended residents from accusations they were "Nimbies" and has called the HS2 business case 'significantly flawed'. In December 2010, he said any route via Mile Oak or Hopwas was "just not acceptable". Soon after, the route via Hopwas Ridge was rejected, a move welcomed by Pincher and campaigners.

He endorsed closer links with Latvia after meeting Prime Minister Valdis Dombrovskis in January 2011. He has since met with the Latvian ambassador with a view to setting up an all-party parliamentary group for Latvia. He opposed moving the clocks permanently forward an hour to Central European Time.

In 2011, he was a member of the special Select Committee set up to scrutinise the bill that became the Armed Forces Act 2011. He unsuccessfully lobbied in Parliament for the Olympic Torch to pass through Tamworth during the 2012 Summer Olympics torch relay.

In 2013, he organised a campaign to get local people to knit "beanie hats" for soldiers of the 3rd Battalion (The Staffords) of the Mercian Regiment, for their pending deployment to Afghanistan. In the same year he helped organise the Tamworth Support our Soldiers (TamworthSOS) campaign, which saw welfare boxes sent to the soldiers in time for Christmas 2014.

In the 2015 general election, Pincher was re-elected with an increased majority of 11,302, polling 23,606 votes, 50.04% of the votes cast and a further 4.3% swing from Labour.

Pincher rejoined the British government in January 2018 as Treasurer of the Household. He was appointed to the Privy Council in November 2018. Prime Minister Boris Johnson appointed Pincher to the position of Minister of State for Europe and the Americas in July 2019. During the 2020 British cabinet reshuffle, Pincher was appointed to succeed Esther McVey as the Minister of State for Housing.

On 8 February 2022, during Johnson's cabinet reshuffle, Pincher was moved back to his former role as Government Deputy Chief Whip in the House of Commons. He was succeeded as Minister of State for Housing by Stuart Andrew. In late July 2022 a petition among Pincher's Tamworth constituents for his removal as an MP received almost 2,000 signatures.

== Sexual misconduct allegations ==
On 5 November 2017, Pincher resigned as Comptroller of the Household (Assistant Whip) and voluntarily referred himself to the Conservative Party's complaints procedure and the police, as part of the 2017 Westminster sexual misconduct allegations. He was accused of sexual assault by former Olympic rower and Conservative candidate Alex Story. In 2017, Story alleged that he had been the subject of unwanted sexual advances from Pincher in 2001, when the MP invited Story to his flat, where Pincher massaged his neck and talked about his "future in the Conservative Party", before changing into a bathrobe. Recounting the episode, Story said that Pincher's advances had made him seem like a "pound shop Harvey Weinstein". (Note: In 2017, the American film producer Harvey Weinstein had been accused of rape, sexual assault and sexual abuse, leading to the #MeToo movement against sexual abuse, sexual harassment, and rape culture; "pound shop" is a reference to British high street discount stores such as Poundland.) Pincher said that "I do not recognise either the events or the interpretation placed on them" and that "if Mr Story has ever felt offended by anything I said then I can only apologise to him". Pincher was also accused of "touching up" former Labour MP Tom Blenkinsop, who told him to "fuck off". On 23 December 2017, the Conservative Party's investigating panel determined that Pincher had not breached the code of conduct.

Pincher resigned as a Government deputy chief whip on 30 June 2022, after he admitted he had "drunk far too much" the night before at the Carlton Club, a private members' club in St James's, London, and having "embarrassed [himself] and other people". It was alleged that he had groped two men. He was suspended as a Conservative MP but remained in Parliament as an independent.

On 3 July 2022, six new allegations against Pincher emerged, involving behaviour over a decade. Three complaints are that Pincher made unwanted advances against other male MPs, one in a bar at the House of Commons and one in Pincher's parliamentary office. One complainant reportedly provided details to Downing Street in February and expressed concerns over Pincher becoming a whip in charge of other MPs' welfare. Pincher maintained he had no intention of resigning as an MP.

In the following days, it emerged that Johnson had been briefed about Pincher's alleged misconduct in 2017. The government initially denied that, at the time of Pincher's appointment, Johnson had any knowledge of specific complaints about Pincher of a similar nature. Johnson later said that was not the case, raising questions about the earlier denials and why Johnson nevertheless had chosen to appoint him as Deputy Chief Whip. Pincher's appointment to deputy chief whip in spite of his history triggered a political scandal, which evolved into a government crisis, as a result of which Johnson announced his forthcoming resignation as Conservative Party leader and prime minister on 7 July 2022. Johnson left office on 6 September and was succeeded by Liz Truss.

In its investigation of his conduct, the Commons Select Committee on Standards censured Pincher in a report published on 6 July 2023, recommending that he be suspended from Parliament for eight weeks. The punishment would have triggered a recall petition and, if signed by 10 per cent of his Tamworth constituents, a by-election.

Pincher appealed against the suspension. On 4 September it was announced that an Independent Expert Panel (IEP) had not upheld the appeal. The IEP concluded that the original House of Commons committee which investigated the sexual misconduct allegations had "approached this task properly, with the correct considerations in mind".

Pincher announced his intention to resign as an MP on 7 September after his unsuccessful appeal against the suspension. The resignation took effect when he was appointed to the office of Steward and Bailiff of the Manor of Northstead on the same day.

== Honours ==
He was sworn as a member of the Privy Council at Buckingham Palace on 12 December 2018, entitling him to the honorific prefix "The Right Honourable" for life.

== Notes ==
Parliament of the United Kingdom
Preceded by Brian Jenkins	Member of Parliament for Tamworth; 2010–2023	Succeeded by Sarah Edwards
Party political offices
Preceded by Esther McVey	Conservative Deputy Chief Whip in the House of Commons; 2018–2019; 2022	Succeeded by Amanda Milling
Preceded by Stuart Andrew	Conservative Deputy Chief Whip in the House of Commons; 2018–2019; 2022	Succeeded by Kelly Tolhurst
