= Spanish Archer =

Former British talent show

- Genre: Talent show
- Created by: Bill Ridley
- Presented by: Rhodri Williams, Ruth Madoc
- Original language: English

Production
- Production company: L!VE TV

Spanish Archer was a talent show of the 1990s, hosted by Rhodri Williams and occasionally Ruth Madoc. It was produced by L!VE TV and filmed at the station's headquarters at Canary Wharf in London.

The title for the show derives from the phrase meaning rejection, where "Spanish Archer" would be said to translate to "El Bow", hence "Given the elbow". The TV show deliberately took this in a very literal manner, and expanded the joke as far as it possibly could.

== Content ==
The show would begin with Willams arriving on the set of a cartoon Spanish village, dressed in a Robin Hood style outfit, complete with toy bow and arrow, and declaring "I am El Bow, I am the Spanish Archer". The contradictions of the supposedly Spanish character, such as the costume, and Williams' undisguised Welsh accent, were played for laughs.

After a few jokes with the studio audience, El Bow would open a door in the set, where the audience would be introduced to a character named Pedro Paella who wore a sombrero, an obviously fake moustache, and rode a toy donkey. After some witty banter, Paella would use an inflatable toy guitar to mime to a backing track of Flamenco music, while singing a comedy introduction to the first act. The tune of the song would always be the same. Pedro Paella appeared in 85 episodes before being succeeded by Terry Tenerife, played by Neville Wilding, later of The Fall.

The acts would then be given one minute to perform, at which point El Bow would appear in the background, loading his toy bow and arrow, and pointing them at a cut-out of a bull, inviting the audience to decide whether the act should continue. If the audience wanted to see more, El Bow would vacate the stage until the end, at which point, the performer would be presented with a prize of a Seville orange.

If the audience did not want to see more, El Bow would loose the arrow, and a large polystyrene elbow would swing onto the set, ushering the act off-stage. As things were redressed for the next act, three Flamenco dancers would appear for as long as was necessary.

Typically, the half-hour show would see 4–6 acts, and at the end of the programme, El Bow would invite all the acts who successfully avoided the elbow back onto the stage, and the audience asked to pick a favourite. The winning act would be given a prize of a straw donkey. Unlike most talent shows, winners did not get to appear again, and there was no grand final, each episode being entirely self-contained.

On occasions, the role of El Bow would be taken by Ruth Madoc. Like Williams, Madoc would exaggerate her natural Welsh accent, despite the character being supposedly Spanish.

== Acts ==
Generally speaking, acts would be from the British Working men's club or cabaret circuits, or members of the public eager to join in or show their talents. Most were happy to play along with the show's deliberately chaotic and self-mocking premise.

Acts were not limited, meaning the show featured a variety of musical, comedy, and speciality acts. The only condition was that the act must be suitable for pre-watershed transmission.

== Reception ==
Spanish Archer was heavily criticised, along with other L!ve TV shows such as Topless Darts and Britain's Bounciest Weather, as being an extreme example of dumbed-down or tabloid television. Despite that it gained a huge cult following.

== Catchphrases ==
- "If you’re good, and if you’re class; where do I shove my arrows?", [Audience] "Gracias!"
- "We were good, we wanted more, and so you win..." [Audience] "The donkey of straw!"
