= Ysgol Gyfun Gymraeg Plasmawr =

Coordinates: 51.498°N 3.248°W

- Cardiff, CF5 3PZ; Wales

Information
- Type: State School
- Motto: 'Gwinllan a roddwyd'
- Established: 1998
- Head Master: Rhodri Thomas
- Gender: mixed
- Age: 11 to 18
- Enrolment: 1,181 (2025)
- Houses: Elái, Taf and Rhymni
- Colours: Maroon and Black
- Website: https://www.ysgolplasmawr.cymru

Ysgol Gyfun Gymraeg Plasmawr is a Welsh-medium comprehensive secondary school in Cardiff. It opened in September 1998 as the second school of its kind in Cardiff. Its buildings had formerly belonged to Waterhall Secondary Modern School and more recently formed Ysgol Gyfun Gymraeg Glantaf's Lower School. The current headteacher is Dr Rhodri Thomas.

== Catchment area and demography ==
The school serves a wide area of western Cardiff that includes Culverhouse Cross, Ely, Caerau, Grangetown, Butetown, Riverside (including Pontcanna), Canton, Fairwater (including Pentrebane), Llandaff, Radyr, Creigiau, Pentyrch, and Gwaelod-y-Garth.

In 2023, 46.5 per cent of pupils spoke Welsh at home. In 2013, 9 per cent of the pupils were recorded as having an ethnic background other than 'White-British'.

== Notable former pupils ==
Sport

- Ben Cabango, Professional footballer for Swansea City A.F.C and Wales international
- Theo Cabango, Welsh rugby union player
- Teddy Williams, Welsh professional rugby union player
- Zak Lee-Green, Welsh and British rower
- Ruby Evans, Olympian, and Welsh and GBR artistic gymnast

== Teaching awards ==
Two of the school's teachers have been awarded Teaching Awards. Mrs Meinir Rees became the Wales SEN Teacher of the Year in 2005, and later that year became the UK SEN Teacher of the Year. The following year, Mr Geraint Rees became the Wales Secondary Headteacher of the Year and was runner up for the UK version of the Award.

== Events ==
Cardiff's first regional eisteddfod, Eisteddfod Caerdydd, was held at Ysgol Plasmawr on Friday 17 January 2020.
