= Dyfed Wyn-Evans =

Welsh baritone opera singer

Dyfed Wyn Evans (born 1969 in Cardiff) is a Welsh baritone opera singer who grew up in Dinas Powis, Glamorgan, Wales. He attended Ysgol Gyfun Gymraeg Glantaf and went on to study at the Royal Northern College of Music and the Vienna Conservatoire. He is married to the mezzo-soprano Carolyn Jackson.

Dyfed Wyn Evans' operatic work includes appearances for Grange Park Opera, English Touring Opera, Broomhill Opera, and the Buxton Festival, and has performed the role of The Podestat in Bizet's Le Docteur Miracle, one of the most challenging of all baritone roles, at the Voray Festival in Besançon. He has also made regular appearances as a guest chorister in the chorus of Opera North.
