= Theo Cabango =

Welsh rugby union player

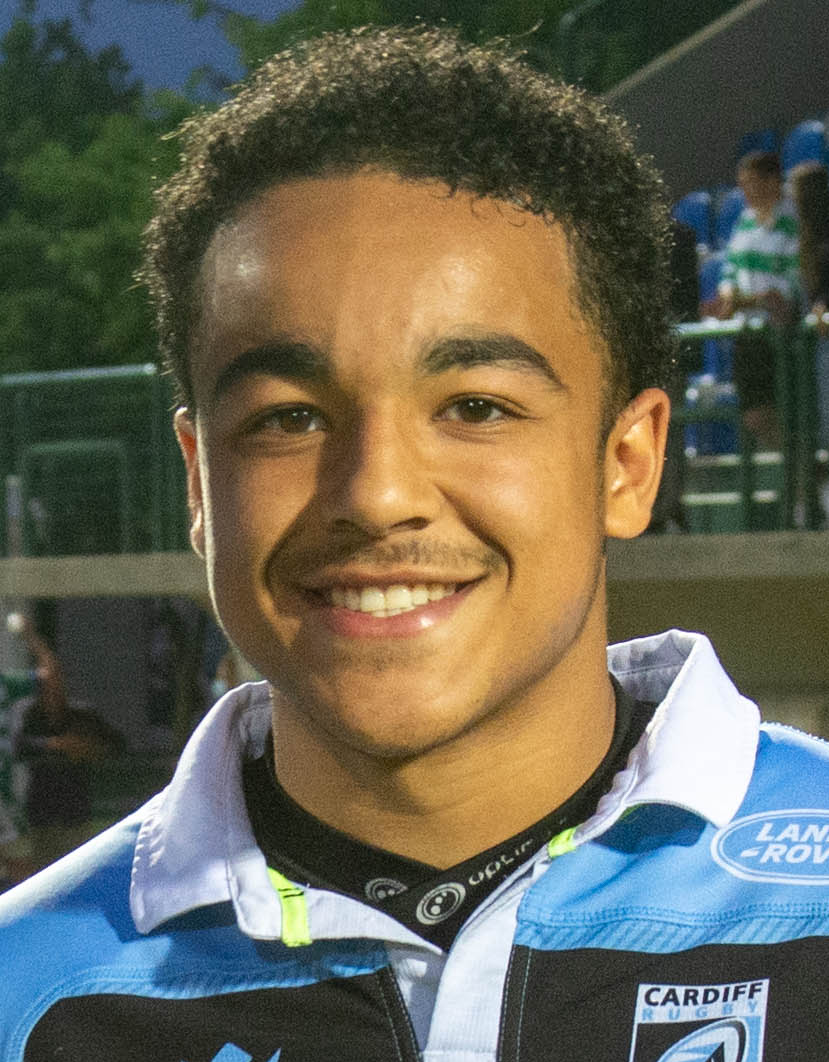
- Born: 29 November 2001 (age 24) Cardiff, Wales
- Height: 175 cm (5 ft 9 in)
- Weight: 83 kg (13 st 1 lb)
- School: Ysgol Gyfun Gymraeg Glantaf
- Notable relative: Ben Cabango (brother)

Rugby union career
- Position: Wing
Senior career
Years	Team	Apps	(Points)
2021–	Cardiff	26	(50)

Theo Cabango is a Welsh rugby union player who plays as a wing for United Rugby Championship side Cardiff Rugby.

== Club career ==
Cabango was named in the Cardiff academy squad for the 2021–22 season. He made his debut for Cardiff in the first round of the 2021–22 European Rugby Champions Cup against Toulouse, starting at wing. This was then followed up with a try scoring appearance in the next game against English Champions Harlequins.

== Personal life ==
Theo Cabango is the younger brother of Wales international footballer Ben Cabango.
