= Llanedeyrn =

District and community in Cardiff, Wales

Coordinates: 51°30′49″N 3°09′05″W

- Community
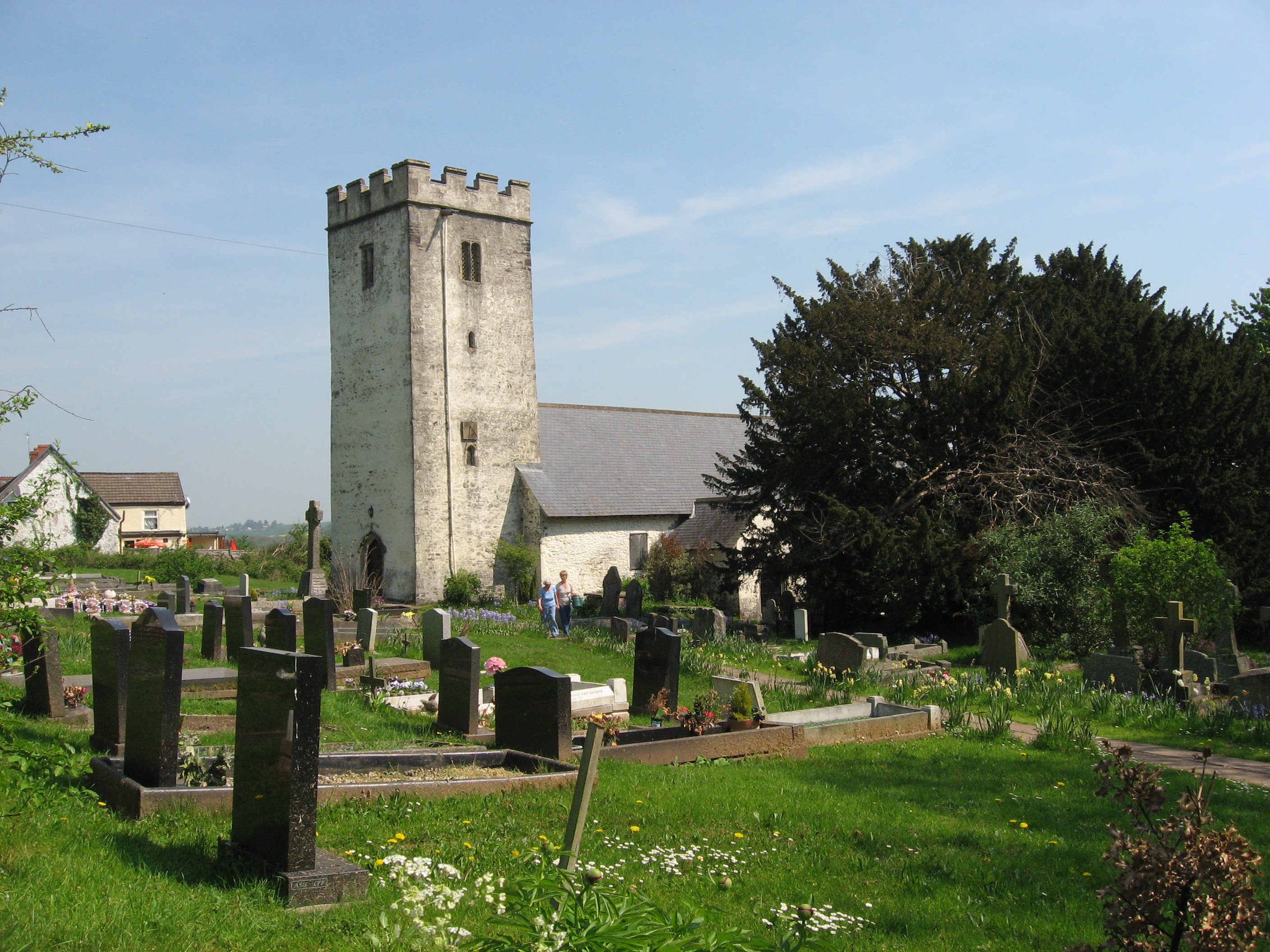
- St Edeyrn's church, Llanedeyrn

- Location within Cardiff
- Principal area: Cardiff
- Country: Wales
- Sovereign state: United Kingdom
- Police: South Wales
- Fire: South Wales
- Ambulance: Welsh
- List of places UK Wales Cardiff Map of the community

Llanedeyrn (Welsh: Llanedern) is a former village, now a district and community, in the east of the city of Cardiff, Wales, located around 3.5 miles from the city centre. The parish of Llanedeyrn rests on the banks of the river Rhymney and is visible nesting on a hill side above the A48(M), westbound on the approach into Cardiff.

== The name ==
The name used in English "Llanedeyrn" is in fact the perpetuation of an erroneous Welsh form.

In Welsh, the name as it stands is pronounced [ɬanˈeːdɛirn]. In English, it is pronounced /lænˈɛdɪn/ as if the name were Lanedin, with Welsh [ɬ] becoming [l], and the difficult, for non-Welsh-speakers, "Edeyrn" becoming an easier "Edin".

The Reverend Sabine Baring-Gould (The Lives of the British Saints, 1908) states that there has been confusion between the names Edern and Edeyrn, and that Edern is "the Latin Aeternus, but it is commonly written in later Welsh Edeyrn, which is really a different name". The name "Aeternus", or "Eternus" means "eternal, everlasting".

One reason for Edeyrn instead of Edern might have been a belief that it was based on Welsh "teyrn" ("king, prince, lord" in earlier Welsh, though nowadays "tyrant, despot, oppressor")

Most earlier forms of the name show it be Llanedern [ɬanˈeːdɛrn], although a couple do show "Edeyrn". The meaning is "church (of) Edern".

The local pronunciation when Gwentian Welsh was spoken here (until the early 1900s) was based on Llanedern. It was Llanetarn [ɬanˈeːtarn], showing the typical south-eastern change of final-syllable [e] to [a] (also a feature of north-western Welsh, in Gwynedd and Anglesey (Ynys Môn)) and the provection of [d] to [t] at the beginning of a penultimate syllable.

A more standard form of this is Llanedarn (south-eastern provection being a somewhat stigmatised feature in Welsh), and this is the form used by Samuel Lewis in 1834 in his Topographical Dictionary Of Wales. He adds "Llan-edeyrn" in brackets after "Llanedarn".

John Hobson Mathews (Mab Cernyw), editor of the "Cardiff Records, Being Materials For A History Of The County Borough From The Earliest Times" mentions Llanedern in Volume 5 (1905), in the "Schedule of Place Names".

"LLANEDERN (the church of Saint Eternus.) A village and parish in the Hundred of Cibwr, three miles north-east from Cardiff, on the main Roman road…."

He remarks further that "Llanedeyrn" is incorrect as it is not the historical form, as too is Llanedarn (which he spells with a final "e" – "Llanedarne") because it is a colloquial form. "The spellings "Llanedeyrn" and "Llanedarne" are alike erroneous; the first is founded on mistaken etymology, the second a barbarism."

== History ==
The village name is believed to refer to a 6th-century prince and Celtic saint named St Edeyrn or Edern.

During the 6th century, St Edeyrn and a fellow monk, St Isan, were given the task of spreading the faith and establishing places of worship. The first location chosen by the two monks was Llanishen. This name commemorates St Isan (Llan + Isan) and the other St Edeyrn (Llan means church or parish in the Welsh language). St Edeyrn was reputed to have travelled widely, and as a result there are churches in North and South Wales dedicated to his memory. St Edeyrn gathered together a community of about 300 that lived and worshipped in the Llanedeyrn area.

The original Norman-style church dating back to 1123 exists only as stonework remnants beneath restoration work completed in 1888; the church today is a simple structure with a tower and six bells. Adjacent to this church is a public house called the Unicorn. The building dates to the 14th century and was converted in the late 18th century.

Nearby in Pen-y-Groes (Welsh: Pen-y-groes) a Calvinistic Methodist school room and chapel was built in 1840.

Comprising only a few buildings, Llanedeyrn became part of Cardiff in 1889.

In the late 1960s, Cardiff Council decided to build low cost social housing in Llanedeyrn, with an estimated 3,500 homes to be erected for 12,000 poor people (2,000 homes owned by the city council and 1,500 private homes). The first of the estates in the area was opened in 1968. The council provided prefabricated and terraced houses, and many two-, three- and multi-storey blocks of flats were constructed.

In 1974 the Maelfa shopping centre was built and a part-time police station was opened, followed in 1975 by the Retreat public house next door. The public house "The Pennsylvania", dating from 1972, closed down and reopened in 2004 as the "New Penn".

The area also had the first comprehensive school built in Wales, Llanedeyrn High School, which Colin Jackson attended in his youth.

== Maelfa ==
Whoever chose the name “Maelfa” Welsh pronunciation: [ˈmailva]] for the shopping centre is unknown, but Llanedeyrn has probably the only instance in Wales of “Maelfa” as a place name. It is a word used in nineteenth-century literary Welsh meaning "shop, market-place", first seen in 1803 in the Welsh-English Dictionary of lexicographer William Owen-Pughe and apparently coined by him. It is literally “profit-place” (mael = profit, advantage, benefit) and (-fa = suffix meaning “place”). “Mael” is in fact from Middle English “vail” (= profit, return, proceeds), from Old French “vail”, from Latin, and related to the English word “value”.

== Amenities ==
Llanedeyrn is home to several primary schools that offer education in the English language, including St. Philip Evans RC Primary School, Springwood Primary School, All Saints Church-In-Wales Primary School, and Llanedeyrn Primary School. Additionally, Ysgol Y Berllan Deg is a Welsh-medium primary school that serves the community. Llanedeyrn is also home to St Teilos Church in Wales High School, which provides secondary education for students in the area.

Llanedeyrn is home to the Powerhouse Hub, a community center that offers support and assistance to residents. Services include welfare and benefits advice, assistance with the housing waiting list, and support for homeless individuals.

There is a Harvester restaurant in Llanedeyrn. There is a hotel on Circle Way East (next to Eastern Avenue) which was rebranded from Park Inn to Mercure Cardiff North Hotel in 2019.

== Housing Estates ==
The housing estates in Llanedeyrn are: Hillrise, Springwood, Glenwood, Coed-Y-Gores, St Phillip Evans Court, Bryn Fedw, Maelfa, Eastside Quarter, Roundwood, Chapelwood, Bryn Fedw, Pennsylvania, Jefferson Court, Lincoln Court, Ael-Y-Bryn, Coed Ederyn, Wellwood and Awel Mor.

== Government ==
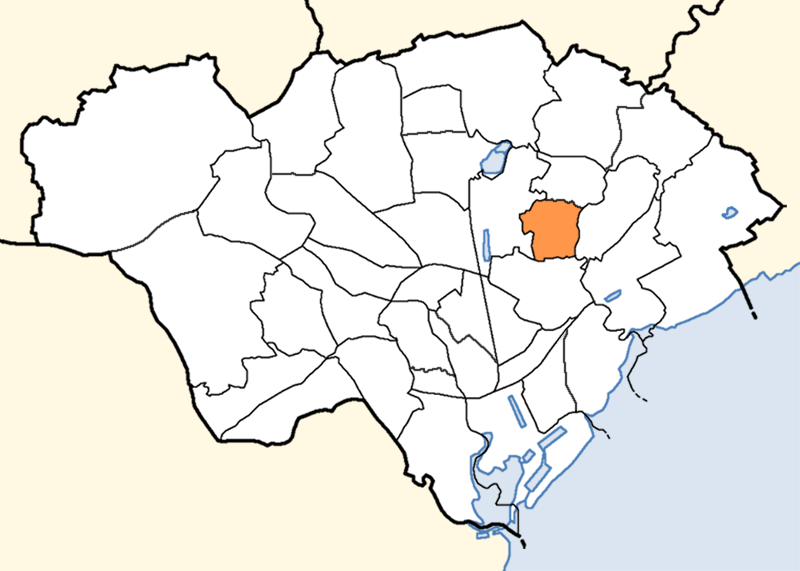
Location of the Llanedeyrn community within Cardiff

In 2016 Llanedeyrn became one of four new communities in Cardiff, having previously been part of the Pentwyn community. However, like many communities in Cardiff, it does not have a community council.

For elections to Cardiff Council Llanedeyrn is part of the Pentwyn electoral ward.

== See also ==
- Llanedeyrn Library
