= Brian Jenkins (politician) =

British politician

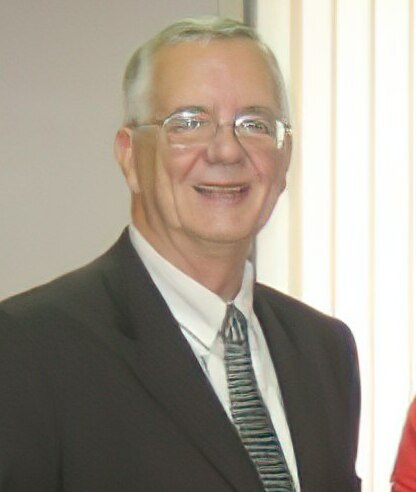

Member of Parliament for Tamworth South East Staffordshire (1996–1997)
- In office 11 April 1996 – 12 April 2010
- Preceded by: David Lightbown
- Succeeded by: Chris Pincher

Personal details
- Born: 19 September 1942 (age 84) Pontypridd, Rhondda Cynon Taf, Wales
- Party: Labour
- Education: London School of Economics Wolverhampton University

Brian David Jenkins (born 19 September 1942) is a British Labour Party politician who was the Member of Parliament (MP) for Tamworth from 1997 until 2010. From 1996 to 1997, he was MP for South East Staffordshire before minor boundary changes in 1997.

== Parliamentary career ==
Jenkins was elected to the House of Commons at the South East Staffordshire by-election in April 1996, following the death of Conservative Party MP David Lightbown. He had previously contested the seat in the 1992 general election.

Jenkins made his maiden speech in the House of Commons on 8 May 1996.

The South East Staffordshire constituency was abolished in boundary changes at the 1997 general election, when he was returned to Parliament for the new Tamworth constituency. He was re-elected at the 2001 general election and again in 2005, but lost the seat to the Conservative Party candidate Chris Pincher in 2010.

Parliament of the United Kingdom
Preceded by David Lightbown	Member of Parliament for South East Staffordshire; 1996–1997	Constituency abolished
New constituency	Member of Parliament for Tamworth; 1997–2010	Succeeded by Chris Pincher
