= Gareth Williams (rugby union, born 1954) =

Welsh rugby union player (1954–2018)

- Born: 6 November 1954 Bedlinog, Wales
- Died: 12 May 2018 (aged 63)
- Height: 193 cm (6 ft 4 in)
- Weight: 98 kg (15 st 6 lb)
- School: Bridgend Grammar School
- University: Cardiff College of Education
- Occupation(s): teacher and later Building Society Manager

Rugby union career
- Position: No. 8
Amateur team(s)
Years	Team	Apps	(Points)
- Bridgend RFC
–	Barbarian F.C.		
–	Glamorgan County RFC		
International career
Years	Team	Apps	(Points)
1980–1982	Wales	5	(0)
1980	British and Irish Lions	0	(0)

Gareth Powell Williams (6 November 1954 – 12 May 2018) was a Wales international rugby union player who played club rugby for Bridgend RFC. In 1980, he toured South Africa with the British Lions as a replacement for the injured Stuart Lane.

He had suffered with multiple system atrophy since 2012 and had been bed-bound since 2017. He died in May 2018.

He was the brother of Owain Williams.
