= News Bunny =

Mascot of L!VE TV

News Bunny was the station mascot of the short-lived UK TV Station L!VE TV.

== History ==
News Bunny first appeared in January 1996, and was played by various people, usually the station's news producers and researchers. Depending on who was available at the time, various other L!VE TV staff were also called upon to don the famous suit in "one off" appearances, including Richard Bacon, later to become a BBC TV Blue Peter presenter, and Nick Ferrari, a previous editor of The Sun's "Bizarre" column. This was documented in the book "L!VE TV - Tellybrats and Topless Darts".

Despite the channel's poor ratings News Bunny attracted tabloid and other media interest, and being mentioned in Parliament. Aside from his studio appearances, News Bunny regularly appeared alongside politicians, pop stars and royalty, many of whom would have preferred to avoid him. These appearances usually occurred during outside broadcasts and publicity stunts. The Bunny gate-crashed an official visit by Michael Heseltine to Canary Wharf in 1996, and secured 8 seconds with Tony Blair.

News Bunny also appeared in the 1997 BBC comedy drama Gobble, a satire on recent food poisoning crises, written by Ian Hislop. During the course of the drama, News Bunny performed Nazi salutes at a mention of the German agricultural minister and was ultimately punched by the protagonist.

News Bunny also stood for Parliament representing the "L!VE TV Party" in the 1996 South East Staffordshire by-election, polling 85 votes (0.2%) to finish 9th of 13 candidates. In order to do this, Mirror Group employee Ashley Hames had to change his name to "News Bunny" for the purposes of the election. According to an apocryphal story circulating among journalists at the time, during the campaign a stunt went wrong and the hapless hack was arrested for obstruction. As there was a police case pending against him, he was unable to change his name back for some time and had to live as "Mr N. Bunny" for weeks longer than he had expected.

== Sources ==
- Quentin Falk, Ben Falk, Television's Strangest Moments: Extraordinary But True Tales from the History of Television, Franz Steiner Verlag, 2005, ISBN 1-86105-874-8, p. 236
- Ashley Hames, Sin Cities, Tonto Books, 2008, ISBN 0-9556326-0-9, p. 33
