= L!VE TV =

Former British television channel

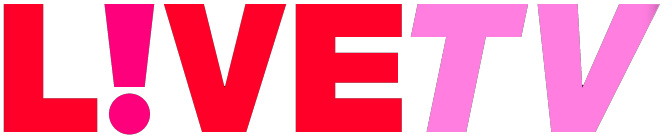

Programming
- Picture format: 4:3, 576i (SDTV)

Ownership
- Owner: Mirror Group Newspapers

History
- Launched: 12 June 1995 original (1); 2003 relaunch (2)
- Closed: 5 November 1999 (1); 28 February 2006 (2)
- Replaced by: Babeworld (2)

L!VE TV was a British television station that was operated by Mirror Group Newspapers on cable television from 12 June 1995 until 5 November 1999. It was later revived for Sky from 2003. In 2006, L!VE TV's name was changed to Babeworld to reflect the channel's gradual change of focus towards "adult material".

== Background ==
L!VE TV was proposed by David Montgomery as part of MGN's move into pay television and due to the dominance on satellite of Sky Television, the decision was made to launch channels exclusively on cable.

In February 1995, Mirror Television, a Mirror Group plc subsidiary, bought flagship cable channel Wire TV which included sports content shown at certain times during Wire's output. Sports programming on Wire had recently been expanded when several sporting rights were acquired, such as Vauxhall Conference football, the live broadcast rights to Lennox Lewis's WBC title fights and the 1996 Cricket World Cup, plus other sporting coverage following a deal with Chrysalis Sport. Mirror Group planned to turn Sportswire into a separate channel to operate alongside L!VE TV, both of which would replace Wire and Wire was closed on 31 May of that year but TCI (owners of Telewest) and NYNEX did a deal with British Sky Broadcasting which included a clause that the cable operators would not launch any rival channels to those already operated by Sky. This caused Sportswire to collapse just days before it was due to launch, leaving Mirror Television with just L!ve TV.

== First incarnation (1995–1999) ==
At its launch in 1995, the station was headed by Kelvin MacKenzie with Janet Street-Porter as managing director. Presented by an on-air team of young presenters who were mostly new to TV, Street-Porter created a channel based around presenter-led blocks of live broadcasting from its base on the 24th floor of London's Canary Wharf building. The output was orientated towards a rolling mix of celebrities, interviews, reviews, lifestyle features and reports from events and happenings across the UK.

Three months after going on air, Street-Porter left due to clashes with MacKenzie over content. MacKenzie axed the rolling content and replaced it with programmes that received much media coverage but low viewer figures. These included Topless Darts, produced by future Times journalist Sathnam Sanghera with commentary by comedian Jimmy Frinton, the surreal talent show Spanish Archer, Talgarth Trousers (a comedy sketch show) and Canary Wharf, a soap opera which used the station's offices in London Docklands as a set. Other features included the weather read in Norwegian by a blonde model (Eva Bjertnes or Anne-Marie Foss) wearing a bikini, Britain's Bounciest Weather with Rusty Goffe (known, although uncredited, for his appearance as an Oompa Loompa in the 1971 film Willy Wonka & the Chocolate Factory) who due to his small stature bounced on a trampoline while doing the forecast (bouncing higher the further north he was talking about), Tiffany's Big City Tips, in which model Tiffany Banister gave the financial news while stripping to her underwear, Painted Ladies, which involved topless girls "painting" on large sheets of paper with various body parts and the News Bunny, a person in a rabbit suit who stood behind a newsreader making gestures and expressions for each item.

Considered cheap and always accused of poor taste, the channel never captured more than 1% of the British television audience under MGN, and at its worst was losing around £7 million a year. It was often described as "tabloid television", in part due to its control by MGN and because MacKenzie had been editor of The Sun.

L!VE TV had a teletext service, initially operated by Intelfax Ltd.

=== Sport ===
The first event shown by the channel was the 1995 Rugby League World Cup and due to the BBC deciding to show live only the opening match, the semi-finals and the final, the channel was the only place to see live coverage of the majority of the games. L!VE also aired the 1995 darts World Masters (Wire TV had shown the 1993 and 1994 tournaments), greyhound racing and weekly highlights from the 1998–99 Football Conference.

In 1996, Mirror Television entered the bidding process with Carlton Television for rights to show FA Premier League football but they were beaten by Sky Sports, and shortly before its demise in 1999, it was said that the channel would, once again, bid for rights to show the FA Premier League, but given the size of the financial commitment required, it is likely that it was merely a publicity stunt.

=== Local L!VE TV channels ===
Part of the overall plan for L!ve TV was for a network of local L!ve TV channels and at the end of 1995 and during 1996 the first local channels launched in Westminster in London, Liverpool and Edinburgh. These channels featured both local content and programming from London. The BT-owned Westminster Cable opt-out had fewer and shorter opt-outs than the Liverpool and Edinburgh channels. Around 20 stations had been planned to launch by the end of the 1990s but only a small number ever made it to air.

== Closure ==
L!VE TV ceased broadcasting on 5 November 1999 at 6 pm with a pre-recorded farewell message from the station's production team.

Earlier in the day, L!VE TV's local channels had aired their final local programmes before handing over to the national channel ahead of the 6pm closedown.

== Second incarnation (2003–2006) ==
In 2003, L!VE TV returned as a free channel on Sky, first on EPG 274, then on 214. Its content was almost entirely archive from L!VE TV. Then in 2004, following competitor channels, its risqué archive of late-night offerings was supplemented with banners advertising adult text messaging.

Towards the end of 2005, the evening and late night were turned over to promoting adult text and phone-in services, involving models stripping to entice viewers into phoning or texting the studio. This was under the pretence that the viewer would get to talk to a studio guest.

By February 2006, content had dwindled to little more than these shows and it was moved to the adult section of Sky's EPG on 28 February 2006. Two days later, the name changed to Babeworld, ending links to the MGN operation. Babeworld closed on 22 October 2011, two days prior to Ofcom publishing a notice of revocation for its broadcast licence, ending eight years of the active Sky channel slot.

== 2007–present ==
A number of archive programmes from L!VE TV, including The Why Files and Lie Detector, were shown on My Channel, formerly known as Eat Cinema, on Sky channel 199.

The entire L!VE TV archive and the rights to the channel's programming were sold on eBay in May 2013 with the winner of the sale buying the entire programming archive for £14,100.

== Personnel ==
=== Presenters ===
- Matt Arnold
- Richard Bacon
- Donna Bernard
- Julia Bradbury
- Bettany Hughes
- Simon London
- Esther McVey
- Charlie Stayt
- Rhodri Williams
- Claudia Winkleman

=== Management ===
- Nick Ferrari
- Kelvin McKenzie
- Tony Orsten
- Rachel Purnell
- Janet Street-Porter
- Ruth Wrigley

== See also ==
- Canary Wharf
- News Bunny

== Sources ==
- Chris Horrie, Adam Nathan, "L!ve TV: tellybrats and topless darts : the uncut story of tabloid television", Pocket Books, 1999, ISBN 0-671-01574-5
