= Cardiff Rugby =

Professional Welsh regional rugby union team

(Wales) Cardiff Rugby
- Union: Welsh Rugby Union
- Nickname(s): The Blue & Blacks
- Founded: 1876; 150 years ago
- Location: Cardiff, Wales
- Ground: Cardiff Arms Park (Capacity: 12,125)
- Chairman: Scott Waddington
- CEO: Jon Flatman
- President: Gareth Edwards
- Coach: Corniel van Zyl
- Captain: Liam Belcher
- Most appearances: Lloyd Williams (256)
- Top scorer: Ben Blair (1075)
- Most tries: Tom James (60)
- League: United Rugby Championship
- 2025–26: 6th (Welsh Shield: 2nd)
1st kit	2nd kit

Official website
- cardiffrugby.wales
- Current season

Cardiff Rugby (Welsh: Rygbi Caerdydd) are one of the four professional Welsh rugby union teams. Based in Cardiff, the club plays at Cardiff Arms Park. The club became professional in 1996, following the professionalisation of rugby union. Between 2003 and 2021 the club's first team was branded the Cardiff Blues.

Traditionally, the club competed in matches against English and Welsh clubs as well as against touring sides.

Today they compete in the United Rugby Championship and in European Professional Club Rugby competitions.

They won European Challenge Cup titles in 2010 and 2018, beating Toulon and Gloucester respectively. Cardiff most recently made the knockout stages of the European Rugby Champions Cup in 2012.

Their most recent league title came in 2000 with victory in the Welsh-Scottish League. They most recently made the URC playoffs in 2026.

Between 2005 and 2018, they also competed in the Anglo-Welsh Cup and won the 2009 title, beating Gloucester at Twickenham.

The club also runs one of the five Welsh rugby academies, age group teams and the semi professional Cardiff RFC side, affectionately nicknamed "The Rags", which competes in Super Rygbi Cymru.

In 2026, Cardiff Rugby will celebrate its 150th season. It is one of only three clubs to feature in the World Rugby Hall of Fame.

== History ==
=== Origins ===
The first reliably recorded Rugby club in Cardiff were Tredegarville, who began playing around 1870. By 1874 a team named Glamorgan FC had been formed and in 1876 they merged with Cardiff Wanderers to form the Cardiff Football Club. At the time, association football was little known in South Wales and it was not until the 20th century that the team became known as Cardiff Rugby Football Club.

Cardiff FC played their first fixture on 2 December 1876, versus Newport at Wentloog Marshes. In 1881, Cardiff beat Llanelli to win the South Wales Challenge Cup, though the tournament was scrapped soon after due to persistent crowd trouble.

=== Hancock and the four three quarter system ===
In 1885 under Frank Hancock, Cardiff began playing with seven backs and eight forwards and perfected what was known at the time as "the passing game". Up until this time, rugby had been played with 9 forwards and 6 backs, with play focused on forward exchanges. Hancock's methods for the first time utilised the full width of the pitch and clever timing of passes to make use of overlaps. He banned his players from kicking penalties and drop goals. For the whole of the 1885–86 season, Cardiff would only score through tries and conversions. They won all but one game all season. Crowds flocked to the Arms Park and the Cardiff style of play helped make rugby football hugely popular throughout the city and surrounding areas. Giving the club a huge well of talent on which to draw from.

These innovations eventually spread throughout the rugby world and in 2011 earned the club a place in the World Rugby Hall of Fame, one of only three clubs to have this honour. Several former Cardiff players including Gwyn Nicholls, Bleddyn Williams, Cliff Morgan, Gareth Edwards, Barry John and Gerald Davies are also members of the Hall of Fame.

=== Early glory ===
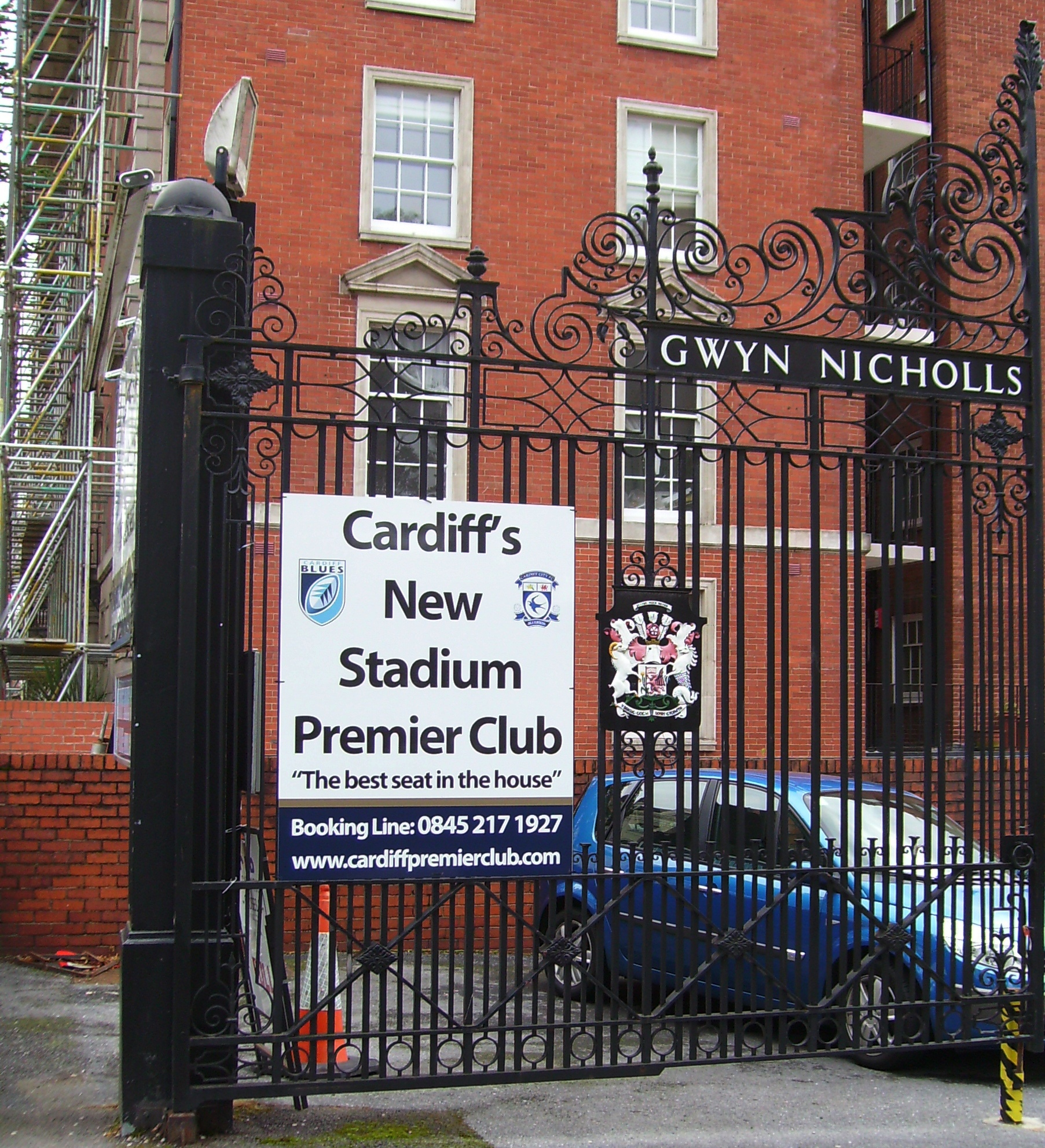
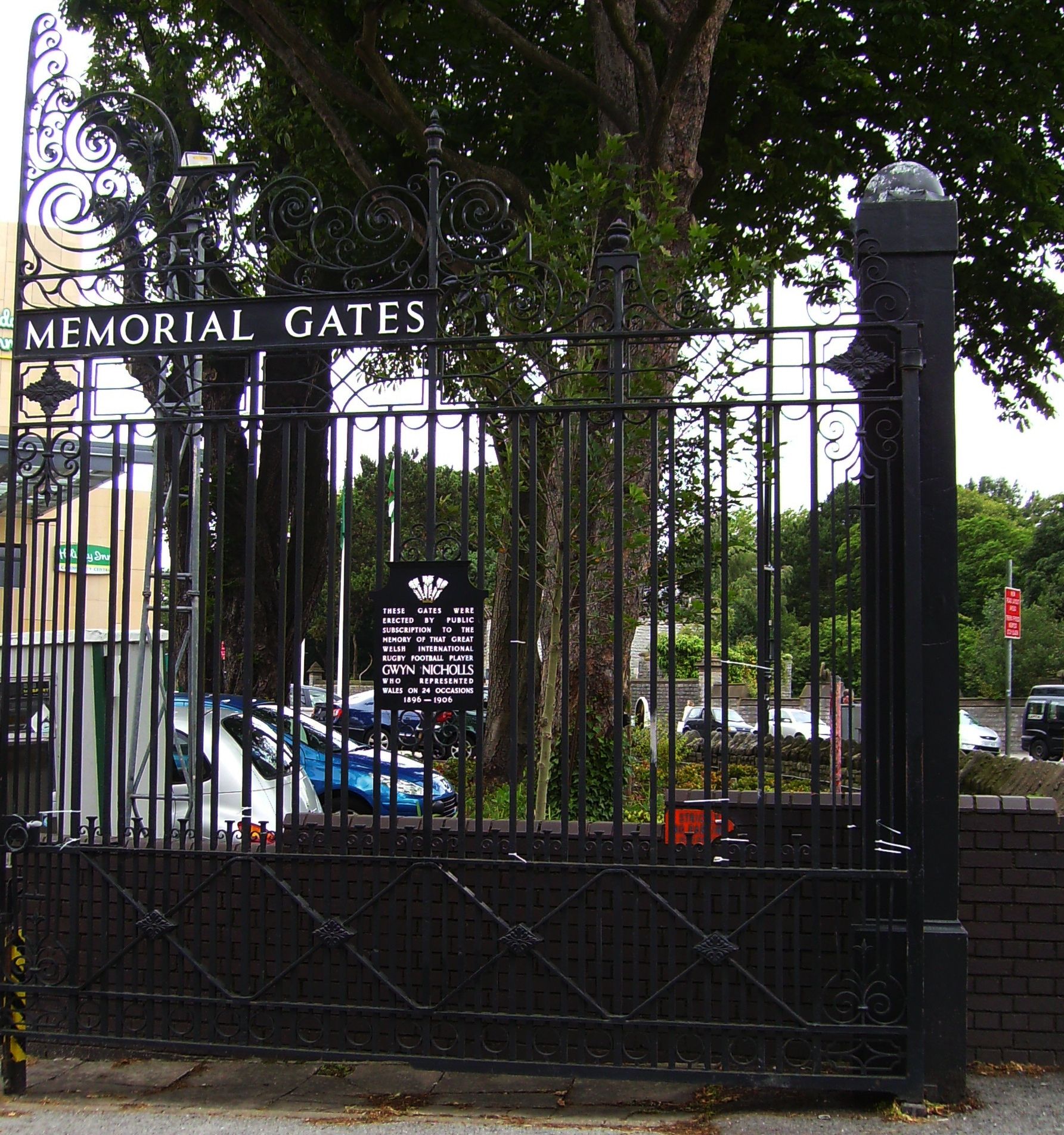
Gwyn Nicholls Memorial Gates to Cardiff Arms Park.

In 1898, Cardiff were unofficial club champions of Wales for the first time. One year later, centre Gwyn Nicholls became the first Cardiff player to play for the British and Irish Lions (then only representing the British Isles), and scored a try in both the first and second Tests against Australia. Nicholls would also go on to captain Wales between 1902 and 1906. In 1904, Cardiff players fly-half Percy Bush, centre Rhys Gabe (who later captained Wales in 1907) and Arthur 'Boxer' Harding all went on the Lions tour to Australia and New Zealand (Nicholls was not selected). Bush scored in the first and second test against Australia, as Nicholls had, and thanks to his tries and goal-kicking during the first three Tests, finished as the top Test points scorer. Gabe scored a try in the third test against Australia, while Harding converted a try in the first Test and was the only Lions player to get on the score sheet against New Zealand, after scoring a penalty goal in the game against them at the end of the tour.

In 1905, there were four Cardiff players in the Wales team that famously beat New Zealand: Harding, Nicholls, Bush, Gabe and Bert Winfield, who would go on to captain Wales three years later. After an eight-year wait, Cardiff also managed to win the unofficial Welsh club championship in 1906 (going unbeaten in every game they played apart from against New Zealand) and 1907.

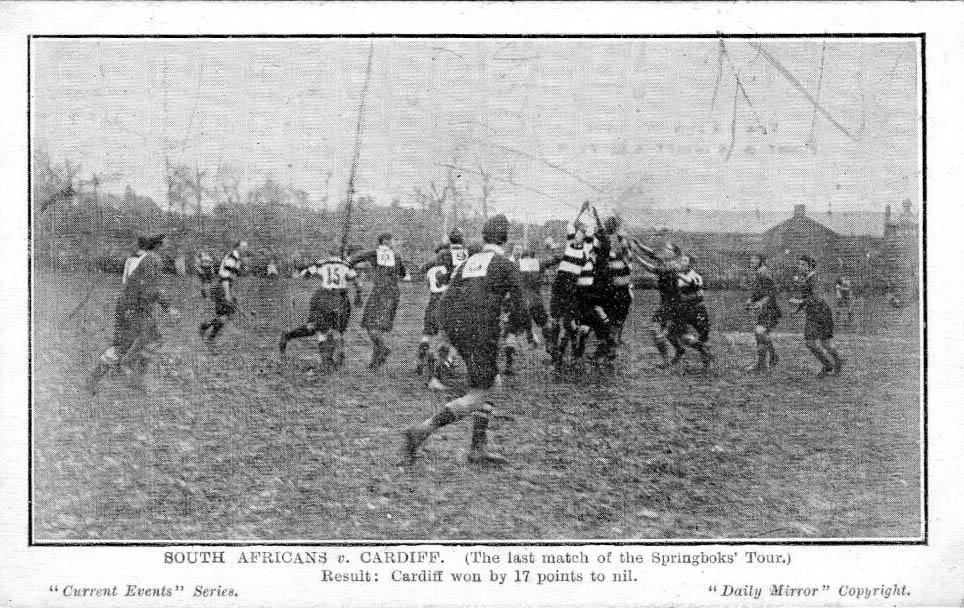
A moment of the match where Cardiff beat South Africa 17–0 at Arms Park

On New Year's Day 1907, Cardiff beat South Africa 17–0, a great achievement considering the national side had been beaten 11–0 by the Boks only a month earlier, and France were thrashed by them 55–6 two days later. The only other team to beat South Africa during their 29-match tour were Scotland.

After this performance, and Wales winning the Five Nations Grand Slam for the first time in 1908, four Cardiff players were selected for the Lions in 1908. Harding was selected as the first Cardiff player to captain the tour and was the only one of the four to have played for the Lions before, the other three being uncapped half-back Willie Morgan, and three-quarters Johnny Williams and Reggie Gibbs. Gibbs remains the only player to have been capped for Wales at least 10 times and averaged more than a try a game, with 17 tries in 16 caps, and Williams came very close to his record with 17 tries in 17 Tests.

The tour was not a success, with the Lions managing to draw the second Test but losing the first and third by over twenty-five points each. However, Gibbs did manage to score in the first Test. The disappointed players made up for their failure the next year by winning the Grand Slam with Wales for the second time in a row and winning the unofficial championship with Cardiff. Cardiff also beat Australia 24–8 on 28 December 1908. However, following this, the glory years were largely over for Cardiff and Wales, although Wales did manage to win the Grand Slam in 1911, and Cardiff came within one point of beating South Africa in a 7–6 defeat in 1912.

==== Between the wars ====
The First World War certainly had some effect on the club – Johnnie Williams died in the first weeks of the Battle of the Somme, and many other players returned wounded or simply too old to play rugby. Cardiff were forced to turn to younger talent for their team. Jim Sullivan was a prime example of this, making his first appearance for Cardiff at the age of 16 in October 1920, and went on to make 38 appearances over the rest of the season. In December 1920, just after his 17th birthday, he became the youngest player to ever appear for the Barbarians. However, in June 1921 he signed for professional rugby league club Wigan, beginning a new trend of Welsh union players "going north" to play rugby league.

In 1922, Cardiff Rugby Club and Cardiff Cricket Club would form the Cardiff Athletic Club, and then purchased Cardiff Arms Park.

In the 1930s, Scrum-half Howard Poole, although never capped for Wales, was selected to play for the Lions in 1930, as was Ivor Williams in 1938. The club also won their first unofficial Welsh championship for 28 years in 1937, and managed to retain the title in 1938 and 1939, before the start of the Second World War.

==== After the Second World War ====
After the resumption of regular rugby, Cardiff beat Australia 11–3 on 21 November 1947, captained by scrum-half Haydn Tanner and were also unofficial Welsh champions in 1947/48, when Bleddyn Williams set a club record of 41 tries in one season, and 1948/49, when the Blue and Blacks went completely unbeaten against Welsh opposition, only Swansea and Newport succeeding in salvaging draws. The club had a fantastic record against Newport during these years, going 15 games unbeaten against them between 1946 and 1950. Cardiff players helped Wales win their first Grand Slam in nearly forty years in 1950, and later that year supplied five players to the Lions for the first time later that year. The five were fly-half Billy Cleaver, prop Cliff Davies, centre Jack Matthews, scrum-half Rex Willis and Bleddyn Williams, the "Prince of Centres". Williams captained the Lions in the third and fourth Tests against New Zealand. Wales won another Grand Slam in 1952, with much the same side.

In 1952–53, Cardiff won the unofficial Welsh championship again, helped by the rise of prodigiously talented fly-half Cliff Morgan, but the best was still to come. On 21 November 1953, Cardiff faced New Zealand in front of a crowd of 56,000 at the Arms Park and, after a brilliant defensive effort following a 5–0 lead at half-time, hung on to win 8–3. Five Cardiff backs were selected in the Wales team captained by Bleddyn Williams that beat the All Blacks again less than a month later. These two results remain the last time either Cardiff or Wales have beaten New Zealand.

Cardiff repeated their unofficial championship victory two years later in 1955, and had three Lions in the 1955 touring side, notable for not including any of the five that toured in 1950. The three this time were fly-half Morgan, centre Gareth Griffiths and wing Haydn Morris. Morgan, in front of a then-world record crowd of 100,000, helped defeat the South Africans 23–22 with a brilliant try despite an injury to Reg Higgins reducing the Lions to 14 men (no replacements were allowed at this time). After the South Africans squared the series in the second Test, Morgan was made captain for the third Test and inspired the team with a combination a stirring team talk and a great kicking game to a 9–6 victory, ensuring the series could not be lost, after which he was dubbed "Morgan the Magnificent" by the South African press. After his Lions heroics Morgan was made captain of Wales, and helped them win the title (although not the Grand Slam) in 1956.

Australia played against and were defeated by Cardiff for the third time in 1957, 14–11 thanks to two great tries from Gordon Wells, after which a reporter from the Sydney Daily Telegraph wrote "we fell to the world's best rugby union club", and another unofficial championship title was secured in 1957–58, but only second row Bill "Roddy" Evans was selected for the Lions in 1959, although he started four of the six Tests. A downturn in Welsh and Cardiff fortunes occurred around this time, although prop Kingsley Jones and second row Keith Rowlands from the club were still selected for the 1962 Lions tour, and Cardiff managed to come within a point of beating the All Blacks again in 1963, scoring the only try of the game. However, the slump began to end in 1964, when Wales shared the Five Nations title with Scotland, after which Wales won the Triple Crown and the title in 1965, followed by another championship in 1966, although the Grand Slam still eluded them. However, these successes helped Cardiff players centre Ken Jones and prop Howard Norris win places on the Lions tour to New Zealand. Later that year Cardiff beat Australia 14–8, although Wales were not able to repeat the feat a month later, losing 14–11.

The 1968 Lions tour was a historic one, containing a record six Cardiff players, wings Keri Jones and Maurice Richards, prop John O'Shea, (then) centre Gerald Davies, fly-half Barry John and scrum-half Gareth Edwards. While Jones and Richards would soon switch codes to play rugby league and O'Shea's tour would be marred somewhat by being the first Lion ever to be sent off for foul play, Davies, John and Edwards would go on to become legends, although their careers got off to inauspicious starts, the Lions losing three of the Tests again South Africa and only drawing the other one.

On the domestic front, they were denied silverware, as despite being top of the unofficial table for almost the whole season, the loss of their six Lions at the end of the season allowed Llanelli to overtake them. Cardiff again finished second behind Newport the next year, with Richards the only Lion to make more than 20 appearances. However, Wales won the Five Nations title and Triple Crown in 1969, only denied the Grand Slam by a draw in France, only to be whitewashed in three games against New Zealand and Australia in the summer.

==== 1970s ====
In 1971, Davies had left for London Welsh, although he would later return. In the spring, John, Edwards and Davies were all ever-presents in Wales's first Grand Slam in 18 years, and in the summer, they were selected for the Lions tour to New Zealand, along with Cardiff teammate John Bevan. The tour remains the only occasion where the Lions have returned victorious from New Zealand. All four Cardiff players started the first Test, and all except Bevan played in the other three Tests. Despite only playing in the first Test, John Bevan became the Lions' record try scorer (including matches against club teams) with 17. Barry John was given the title "King Barry" by the New Zealanders after scoring 30 of the Lions' 48 points.

1971–72 was the first season where the WRU Challenge Cup was introduced. Cardiff reached the semi-final, before being beaten 16–9 at the Brewery Field by Neath, who went on to beat Llanelli in the final. In 1972, John retired at the age of 27, not liking his celebrity status after the Lions tour.

The next season was also disappointing for Cardiff, although fullback John Davies scored a club record of 209 points in his first season for the club. They were soundly beaten by New Zealand 20–4, only a week after Llanelli had beaten them 9–3. In the Cup, they defeated South Wales Police, Mountain Ash, Ebbw Vale, Blaina and Swansea on their way to the final, but were again outclassed and lost 30–7 to Llanelli. In 1973–74 Cardiff reached the Cup semi-finals for the third year running, but were defeated 9–4 by Aberavon. Gareth Edwards, however, led his country to a 24–0 win over Australia in November 1973. In 1974, Gerald Davies decided to return to Cardiff from London Welsh. Edwards and Davies were picked for the 1974 Lions tour to South Africa (although Davies refused to go in protest against apartheid) and Edwards started all four Tests, where the Lions went unbeaten through all 22 matches, winning 21. In the final Test, the South African referee blew the final whist four minutes early with the scores level and the Lions camped on the South African line.

In 1974–75 Cardiff failed to reach the WRU Challenge Cup semi-finals for the first time, losing 13–12 to Bridgend in the third round, despite not conceding a try in the entire Cup. However, on 1 November 1975, Cardiff met Australia for the fifth time in their history and, for the fifth time defeated them, 14–9, despite the absence of Edwards due to influenza. Both Edwards and Davies represented Wales in the 1976 Five Nations Grand Slam. During 1976–77, Cardiff defeated Pontypool and Aberavon on their way to the Challenge Cup final, where they were beaten 16–15 by Newport. Edwards decided not to go on the 1977 Lions tour, to show loyalty to his company who had let him go on three Lions tours previously. However, another Cardiff scrum-half, uncapped Brynmor Williams was picked, and played in the first three Tests before being injured in the third.

Both Davies and Edwards started for Wales in the 20–16 victory away to Ireland in the 1978 Five Nations that sealed a record three Triple Crowns in as many years, with Edwards also starting the next week and also dropping a goal in the 16–7 victory against France that sealed Wales their third Grand Slam in eight years. This was Gareth Edwards' final match for Wales – he had won 53 consecutive caps, never being dropped or injured, and scored 20 tries. Gerald Davies also retired from Wales after a 19–17 defeat in Sydney – tied with Edwards on 20 tries, scored in 46 caps.

In the 1977–78 club season, in a game against Pontypool, Davies scored four tries despite only touching the ball four times due to the dominance of the Pooler pack. The tries provided Cardiff's only points in a 16–11 victory. Cardiff's cup run continued to the semi-finals, where they were beaten by Swansea 18–13.

==== 1980s ====
Flanker Stuart Lane, fly-half Gareth Davies, hooker Alan Phillips and scrum-half Terry Holmes from the club were chosen to tour with the Lions to South Africa in 1980, however Davies was the only one to start a Test match. The four went on to help Cardiff finally break their duck and win the WRU Challenge Cup (known as the Schweppes Cup for sponsorship reasons) with a 14–6 victory over Bridgend the following season, with Davies scoring two penalties and tries from centre Neil Hutchings and back-rower Robert Lakin. They repeated the feat in 1982, winning on try count thanks to a score from prop Ian Eidman after a 12–12 draw again against Bridgend, with the other points coming from fly-half David Barry, and also ended a 24-year wait by winning the Unofficial Welsh Championship, thereby completing the club's first (and so far only) league and cup double.

In 1983, Terry Holmes was again picked for the Lions, this time alongside second row Bob Norster. Both players were picked for the first team but Holmes was injured in the first Test and Norster in the second, ending their tours. Cardiff had been knocked in the quarter-finals of the 1982–83 cup by eventual winners Pontypool, but made it up for it with a third triumph in four years, beating Neath 24–19 in the final with tries from flanker Owen Golding and wing Gerald Cordle and 16 points from Gareth Davies. Then, on 12 October 1984, they beat Australia 16–12, thanks to eight points from Gareth Davies along with a penalty try and a score from Adrian Hadley. The same Australian side went on to complete a "Grand Slam" (beating England, Scotland, Wales and Ireland). Australia haven't played Cardiff RFC since, leaving the club with a perfect record of six wins from six games against the Wallabies (although Cardiff Blues did lose to Australia 31–3 in 2009). 1985 was very nearly another successful year for the club, beating Neath and Pontypool on their way to the Schweppes Cup final where, despite tries from wing Gerald Cordle and captain Alan Phillips alongside two penalties from Gareth Davies, they fell to an agonising 15–14 defeat to Llanelli. After this, Terry Holmes left the club to play rugby league.

The club bounced back immediately however, beating Newport in the final of 1985–86 cup final 28–21, with Adrian Hadley scoring a hat-trick, Holmes's replacement, scrum-half Neil O'Brien, bagging another try and 12 points coming from the boot of fly-half Gareth Davies in his last game for the club against Welsh opposition before retiring. One year later, Cardiff were part of the first Challenge Cup final to go to extra time, with the scores 9–9 after 80 minutes, all Cardiff's points coming from the boot of Davies's replacement, Geraint John. Gerald Cordle scored to break the deadlock but the conversion was missed and Swansea scored a converted try soon after, putting them in the lead. But a late drop goal from full-back Mike Rayer won it for the Arms Park side capping one of the most successful periods in the club's history, with five Schweppes Cup victories in seven years.

In 1987, the first Rugby World Cup was held in New Zealand. Cardiff props Dai Young, Jeff Whitefoot and Steve Blackmore, wing Adrian Hadley, centre Mark Ring and hooker Alan Phillips all were selected in Wales's squad (Young was called up as an injury replacement) which finished third. Cardiff's success began to tail off towards the end of the 1980s, with Adrian Hadley leaving for rugby league in 1988 and Gerald Cordle following in 89, and they could only manage two Cup quarter-finals and one semi-final appearance in the last three years of the decade. However, both Dai Young and Bob Norster were selected for the Lions tour to Australia in 1989, the only Lions team to come from 1–0 down to win the series. Young followed Hadley and Cordle to rugby league shortly after this, while Whitefoot and Norster both retired in 1990.

==== League rugby ====
In 1990, the unofficial Welsh championship was replaced by a league structure involving promotion and relegation. Cardiff competed in top flight but could only manage a fourth-place finish in 1990–91, and exited the Cup at the quarter-final stage. The season did involve some highlights however, such as beating league runners-up and Cup champions Llanelli 43–0 at the Arms Park and beating league champions Neath 18–4 away in the last game of the season.

1991–92 was possibly the club's worst-ever season, beset with disagreements between coach Alan Phillips and manager John Scott. Cardiff crashed out of the Cup before the quarter-final stage and lost at home to Maesteg and Newbridge in the league. Their final league finish was ninth, which would have led to their relegation but the WRU decided mid-season to switch to a 12-team Premiership, therefore saving Cardiff and Maesteg from relegation. Both Scott and Phillips resigned following the season.

Australian Alex Evans took over at Cardiff as coach for the 1992–93 season, bringing in former Arms Park legend Terry Holmes and famous ex-Pontypool front-row member Charlie Faulkner as assistants, and helped a turnaround in the club's fortunes, winning their first seven matches of the season and 20 of their first 22 to top the league in the new year. This run came to an end on 23 January; they were knocked out of the Schweppes Cup by St Peter's, who were fourth from bottom of Division Four. The Blue and Blacks only lost four league games all season though, but were unlucky to be competing against Llanelli in the league, who won the double and were considered the best club team in the UK after beating Australia 13–9.

In 1993–94 they slid back to fourth in the league but won the SWALEC Cup (renamed from Schweppes Cup for sponsorship reasons) by beating Llanelli, who'd won the tournament for the last three years running. The score in the final was 15–8, with tries from Mike Rayer and club captain centre Mike Hall and kicks from fly-half Adrian Davies. In 1994–95 Cardiff won the final league title of the amateur era in Wales, as well as reaching the semi-finals of the Cup before going down 16–9 to Swansea.

=== Professionalism ===
With professionalism dawned a new era at Cardiff RFC. It allowed them to sign legendary outside-half Jonathan Davies back from rugby league, and another major change was that there would be a European Cup, sponsored by Heineken, containing teams from France, Ireland, Wales, Italy and Romania (England and Scotland did not join for another year). Cardiff progressed to the knock-out stages in November by drawing with Bordeaux-Begles and beating Ulster. December saw the end of the Alex Evans era, as he departed to return home to Australia. Terry Holmes took charge of the club, and in his first full match the Blue and Blacks beat Leinster away to progress to the first Heineken Cup final. The game was played at Cardiff Arms Park in front of a crowd of 21,800, where despite 18 points from the boot of Adrian Davies, Cardiff were beaten 21–18 by Toulouse after extra time.

Cardiff, despite not losing a league game under Holmes, were runners-up on the domestic front as well, finishing level with Neath on points but coming second on try count. After the end of the 95–96 season Peter Thomas invested money into the club allowing them to sign Rob Howley, Dai Young back from rugby league, Leigh Davies, Gwyn Jones and Justin Thomas for the cost of around £2million. Internationals Mark Ring, Steven Blackmore and the half-backs that had started the Heineken Cup final, Andy Moore and Adrian Davies all departed.

Despite all the new signings, Cardiff lost their first three games of the season, and the 1996/97 season was in many respects worse than the year before – Cardiff were knocked out in the Heineken Cup semi-finals by eventual champions Brive, and in the Welsh Premier Division they fell to third, behind champions Pontypridd and Llanelli. However, after Alex Evans returned to head up the coaching team, that season did lead to some silverware, as Cardiff beat Llanelli 36–26 in the semi-final and Swansea 33–26 in the final of the SWALEC Cup. Grzegorz Kacala and Tony Rees, both forwards part of the Brive team that knocked Cardiff out of the Heineken Cup and went on to win it, were signed for 1997/98 along with Wales internationals Steve Williams and Spencer John (Gareth Thomas also arrived in December from Bridgend).

Despite Cardiff's difficulties, compounded by those of the national team, Howley and Young were both chosen to go on 1997 Lions tour to South Africa. Howley had to return home early due to injury and neither of the two Cardiff players started a Test match.

In the 1997/98 season, Cardiff were Wales's sole representative in the quarter-finals of the Heineken Cup, and were beaten away in rematch of the previous year's quarter-final, by Bath, who would go on to win the tournament. However, their domestic cup campaign ended before the quarter-final stage, losing 24–9 to Ebbw Vale, and they finished runners up to Swansea in the League. Following this season, Alex Evans left Cardiff for Australia for the second time and Terry Holmes was put back in charge.

==== Rebel season ====
Cardiff and Swansea had proposed the formation of a British league, containing the top division English clubs, the two Scottish regional sides (Edinburgh and Glasgow) and four Welsh clubs (seeing as Cardiff had got further than any other Welsh club in every Heineken Cup so far, Swansea were the league champions and they represented the two largest urban areas in Wales, it was assumed two of these clubs would be Cardiff and Swansea).

Both the RFU and the English clubs had agreed to this, but the WRU refused due to an ongoing legal battle with the English clubs over the negotiation of commercial rights (which would lead to the English clubs not participating in the 1998–99 Heineken Cup). Instead, the WRU demanded all top-flight clubs sign 10-year loyalty agreements, where they were guaranteed top-flight status and committed themselves to staying within the Welsh league structure.

Cardiff and Swansea refused to sign these agreements and were expelled from the Welsh Premier Division. The Allied Dunbar Premiership (the English league) teams announced that two teams would have a rest weekend every week allowing them to play friendlies against Cardiff and Swansea. Cardiff's first home match of the season was against Saracens, who'd finished second in the Allied Dunbar Premiership the season before. Cardiff won 40–19 in front of a crowd of 10,021, larger than the entire combined attendance of the Welsh Premier Division that weekend. The club went on to win all their home games, but fell to defeat ten times on their travels.

Although Cardiff and Swansea were both expelled from the Welsh League, they were allowed to continue to compete in the SWALEC Cup against Welsh opposition. Both teams reached the semi-finals, Swansea were to play Cross Keys and Cardiff Llanelli. In the week prior to the game, Cardiff chairman Peter Thomas spoke to the players following a training session, where he emphasised the importance of winning the game, describing it as "the biggest game in the club's history". Cardiff lost 39–10 in a match chief executive Gareth Davies described "The worst performance by a Cardiff side I have ever seen." Six days later, it was announced Terry Holmes would stand down as coach at the end of the season, and Pontypridd and Wales assistant coach Lyn Howells would take charge on a two-year contract.

Swansea went on to beat Llanelli 37–10 in the cup final, but the rebels were still forced to sign loyalty agreements and return to Welsh domestic setup, now including Edinburgh and Glasgow.

==== Lynn Howells ====
After the rebel season, Cardiff signed British Lion outside-half Neil Jenkins, as well as Wales internationals second-row Craig Quinnell and flanker Martyn Williams. The start of the 1999–2000 season for Cardiff was hampered by them missing 13 first choice players due to the World Cup, and in late September they fell to a humiliating 60–18 defeat away to Llanelli at Stradey Park. However, despite this poor start and failing to win in the first rounds of the Heineken Cup, they progressed to the Heineken Cup quarter-finals, where they were beaten by Llanelli, and clinched the Welsh/Scottish League title with three games remaining, The season is also notable for a club record victory of 116–0 over Duvnant in the Welsh/Scottish League, and the club going unbeaten at home for almost the whole season, before losing 41–40 to Swansea in their very last game of the season (with the title already sewn up). This was Cardiff's first defeat at the Arms Park for over two years, since 13 December 1997, again against Swansea.

During the close season Cardiff lost Leigh Davies to Llanelli but signed South African centre Pieter Muller to replace him. They won their first five Welsh/Scottish League matches, seemingly making certain they would retain their title, especially as Swansea lost three of their first five games. The highlight of the season was in late October, when the Blue and Blacks stunned English Premiership leaders Saracens by defeating them home and away in the Heineken Cup.

The club's great form began to stutter as the millennium drew to a close, but it was in January the wheels really came off. After a magnificent 42–16 victory over Ulster, two yellow cards led Cardiff to defeat in Toulouse, meaning they would have to travel to Gloucester in the quarter-finals. A turgid forward battle resulted in a 21–15 defeat for the Blue and Blacks. Two weeks later they then lost to Bridgend, their first home defeat of the season, meaning Swansea pulled ahead in the title race. Another defeat at Ebbw Vale in March condemned them to a trophyless season. Following the unsuccessful season Lynn Howells's contract was not renewed and Rudy Joubert was appointed director of rugby. Gareth Thomas also left the club along with nine other players, but Rob Appleyard, Matt Allen and Craig Hudson all joined.

For the 2001 Lions tour, four Cardiff players were picked, Rob Howley, Neil Jenkins, Dai Young and Martyn Williams. Young became the first player to tour for the Lions in three different decades. Howley started the first two Tests, with Williams on the bench in all three, and Jenkins coming on to replace Jonny Wilkinson in the second. Howley was dropped for the third, deciding Test.

==== Rudy Joubert ====
2001–02 was the first year of the Celtic League, containing teams from Wales, Ireland and Scotland. The pool stage would begin in mid-August and continue on for a month. Cardiff were drawn into the smaller, seven-team pool (with four teams going through to the quarter-finals).and started their campaign in unconvincing fashion, winning three games but still being knocked out of the competition on points difference. In the Heineken Cup, rugby league convert Iestyn Harris, signed for £1million scored a hat-trick on his debut in a 46–7 against Glasgow. Overall the club's European form was mediocre however, as despite winning all their home games they failed to register an away win and were eliminated at the pool stage for the first time in their history On the domestic front, Cardiff again went unbeaten at home until the final game of the season, but again were unable to back it up on the road and finished fourth – their first season out of the top three in a decade.

==== Dai Young ====
The off season was all change for Cardiff. Rudy Joubert returned home to South Africa and Dai Young became player-coach of the club. Internationals Rob Howley, Neil Jenkins, Craig Quinnell and Jonathan Humphreys all left the club as well. The Welsh/Scottish League was abolished, returning to just nine Welsh teams in the top-flight, and Celtic League games no longer counted towards the domestic league.

In the first two months of the season, Cardiff managed to improve on their Celtic League record from the previous year, winning four out of seven games and progressing to the knockout stage. The quarter final was away to Edinburgh on 30 November and, despite a dreadful first half performance that saw them 19–6 down at the break, a much improved second half performance saw them record a 26–22 win, and go through to the semi-finals.

Their decent start to the season collapsed after that however, with Cardiff failing to score at home for the first-time in 30 years in a 31–0 defeat in the Heineken Cup against Northampton in December. January was a disastrous month for the club too, with a 32–10 thrashing away to Neath in the Celtic League semi-finals, despite the home team making 12 handling errors in Cardiff's 22. Two weeks later the club's first ever Heineken Cup whitewash was completed with a record 75–25 defeat away to Biarritz. Domestically, the Blue and Blacks' final season as a top-tier rugby team was less disappointing. They reached the semi-finals of the Cup, although they capitulated in a similar fashion to their Celtic League semi-final, this time 44–10 away to Llanelli. In the League they finished third, 3 points behind Neath and 11 behind Bridgend.

=== The reorganisation of Welsh Rugby ===
When Rugby Union turned professional in 1995, Welsh rugby was organised in a league pyramid, at the top of which was the Premier Division of twelve teams that had existed for over a century as amateur clubs. However, it became clear over the next few seasons that under professionalism, Welsh Rugby would need to find a new structure.

In 1996 Cardiff Athletic Club had created Cardiff Rugby Ltd to run its professional rugby team, with former player and successful businessman Peter Thomas its first Chairman – a position he would continue to hold for the next 23 years. Cardiff were among the clubs pushing hard for the creation of an Anglo Welsh or British League in the late 1990s, which would put them in frequent conflict with the Welsh Rugby Union. This culminated in the "rebel season" of 1998/99. Thomas would refer to the WRU as "an amateur body living in the dark ages".

The next few seasons saw multiple plans for the future of Welsh professional rugby put forward. A solution known as the "gang of six" proposal also included Cardiff but was defeated by a vote of the 237 WRU member clubs.

By 2002, after years of financial problems and bitter wrangling, nine clubs remained at the top of the Welsh game. A solution was finally accepted by new WRU CEO David Moffett and it was agreed that five teams would take part in future professional competitions.

Cardiff and Llanelli were to be "standalone" teams, meaning that they would not have to amalgamate with any of the other professional clubs.

After a period of considering different names including "Cardiff 76ers" and "Cardiff Blue and Blacks", Cardiff settled on "Cardiff Blues".

=== 2003–2011: Dai Young years ===
==== Difficult first seasons ====
Dai Young had first been appointed Head Coach at the Arms Park in 2002, after the early departure of South African coach Rudy Joubert. Since his return from rugby league in 1996, Young had played in Cardiff teams that had won the 1999-2000 Welsh-Scottish League title, and had played in the latter stages of the Heineken Cup every season (apart from the 1998/99 "rebel season") until 2001/02.

But over the two seasons running up to what became known as Welsh rugby's "regionalisation", cut backs had been made at the Arms Park and high-profile players like Gareth Thomas, Jonathan Humphreys, Rob Howley and Neil Jenkins had left. Nevertheless, the first squad as Cardiff Blues could still call on quality Welsh internationals like Rhys Williams, Tom Shanklin, Iestyn Harris and Martyn Williams, who would compete for Wales at the 2003 Rugby World Cup. Popular Canadian forward Dan Baugh and veteran South African centre Pieter Muller also remained at the club.

Aside from these few star names, the first squad under the Cardiff Blues brand was largely made up of lesser known players. Some like Nicky Robinson, his brother Jamie Robinson, Robin Sowden-Taylor and T Rhys Thomas would go on to become key figures at Cardiff. Another notable player was Cardiff fireman and part time rugby player Lee Abdul. After being brought into the squad as cover during the 2003 Rugby World Cup, Abdul would score a record four tries from the wing against the Ospreys before his career was cut short by injury.

Young's first season as a coach had been disappointing, and the first season as Cardiff Blues similarly frustrated fans. Increasingly, there were calls for Young to step down and these calls would continue for the next few seasons. However, the Cardiff board would stand by Young.

After the demise of the Celtic Warriors in 2004, the Cardiff Blues region was expanded to include Rhondda Cynon Taff, Merthyr and South Powys. Cardiff Blues would also sign players made redundant by the scrapping of the Warriors, including Gethin Jenkins and Robert Sidoli.

Calls for Young to be removed intensified between November 2004 and January 2005 when the team went eight games without recording a victory. Following the 15–38 loss to Stade Français Paris the players were booed from the field by their own supporters.

Finishing in 9th position in the 2004-05 Celtic League meant that to qualify for the Heineken Cup, Cardiff had to compete in a play-off game against the third place Italian side Arix Viadana. Cardiff Blues won this game 38–9, thus qualifying for the Heineken Cup through what the media described derisively as the cat flap.

==== Investment, signings and rebuilding ====
In the summer of 2005 funds were made available to sign new players allowing Dai Young to start rebuilding the side. Former New Zealand No. 8 Xavier Rush was among several new signings who gave the squad a much stronger look. Also, a new custom-built training headquarters was established at Hensol in the outskirts of Cardiff.

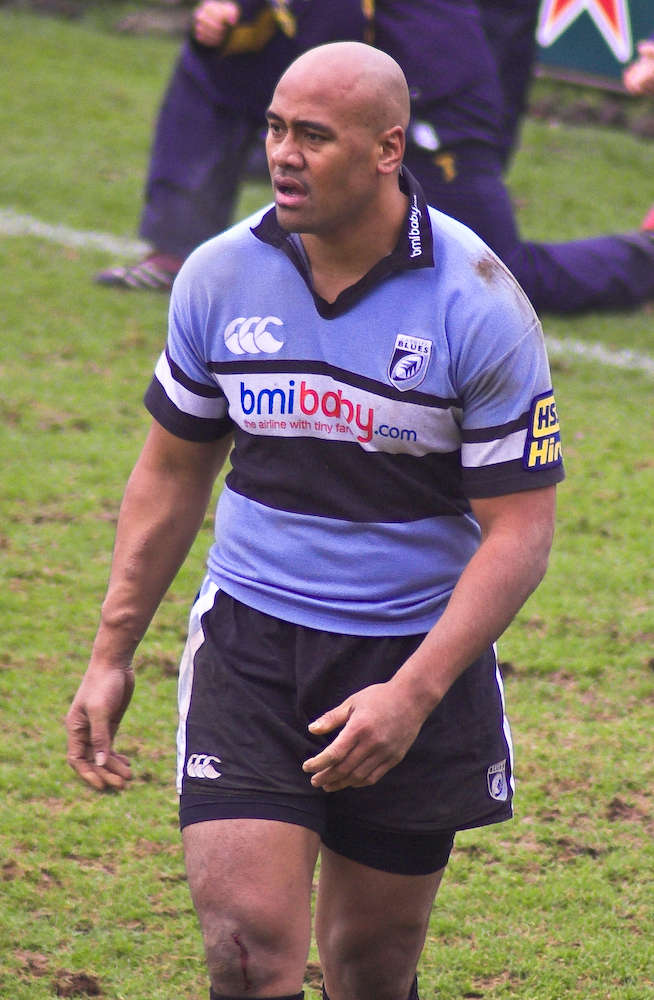
New Zealand Jonah Lomu playing for Cardiff Blues in 2006

Results did not improve immediately, with the 37–20 win over Saracens in October 2005 the highlight of a mixed start to the season. However, in a prematch announcement it was confirmed that rugby legend Jonah Lomu had agreed to join on a temporary, "pay as you play" basis as he tried to rebuild his career in time for the 2007 Rugby World Cup.

Lomu was recovering from a kidney transplant, but the signing gave notice of the team's renewed ambition. His home debut versus Calvisano was greeted by a capacity crowd and the signing was regarded as a marketing masterstroke. Results improved with wins over the Ospreys and the Newport Gwent Dragons in December.

In January 2006, Cardiff Blues were knocked out of the Heineken Cup after losing 3–21 at home to Perpignan and then losing 3–48 to the relegation threatened Leeds Tykes. The poor run prompted the management to issue "final warnings" to under performing players. As had been the case in the two previous seasons, results improved in the latter months of the season, and in May, 15,327 watched Cardiff Blues beat Leinster 40–31 at the Millennium Stadium. At the time it set a new record for the highest attendance recorded for any Celtic League match.

==== New optimism ====
More signings, including former New Zealand fullback Ben Blair, alongside some talented academy graduates (notably Bradley Davies and Tom James) further enhanced the quality of the Cardiff Blues squad for the 2006–07 season.

In the Heineken Cup, Cardiff Blues recorded their first win in France, beating Bourgoin 13–5. Encouraged by the strong attendance for the previous season's Leinster clash, the Millennium Stadium was again used. This time hosting Leicester Tigers were the opposition and the match attracted a crowd of 26,309 spectators.

In the Celtic League, performances were now much improved. Cardiff finished second after having beaten Leinster at home to go top, only for the Ospreys to win at Borders the next day to claim the title.

Further big signings were added to the Cardiff Blues squad over the summer of 2007 including the return of Gareth Thomas, plus Paul Tito and Jason Spice. However the season was hit by the lengthy absence of important playmaker Nicky Robinson. For the second season in a row, Cardiff Blues finished second in the Celtic League and were eliminated at the pool stage of the Anglo Welsh Cup, despite taking Bath's 12 month unbeaten home record.

But in Europe, Cardiff made the quarter-finals of the Heineken Cup after recording two wins over Bristol, a win and a draw with Harlequins and a rousing home victory over Stade Francais at the pool stage. They lost their away quarter-final to Toulouse but returning to the knockout stages of the tournament was seen a major step forward for Dai Young's team.

==== Anglo Welsh Triumph and Heineken Cup Heartbreak ====
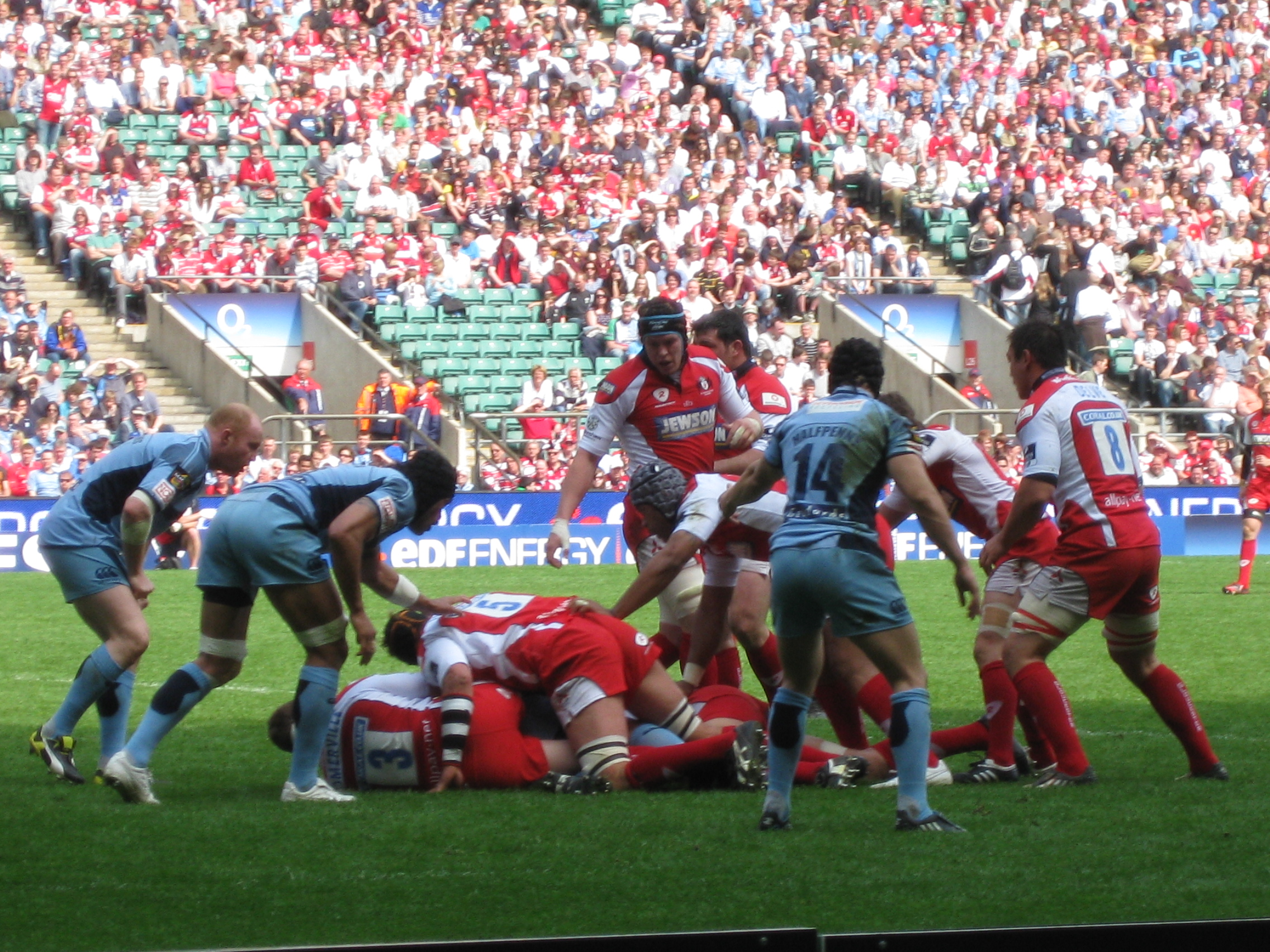
Cardiff vs Gloucester, Anglo-Welsh Cup final at Twickenham, April 2009

By the 2008/09 season, Young's squad had a settled look, with few new signings. The team would finish only 6th in the Celtic League, but the club's focus on cup competitions would see them win the Anglo-Welsh Cup final 50–12 against Gloucester at Twickenham and make the semi-finals of the Heineken Cup. The Heineken Cup campaign began with a 20–56 bonus point victory away to Calvisano. before another a bonus point 37–24 win against Gloucester at the Millennium Stadium before a crowd of 27,114. The Cardiff Blues then claimed back-to-back victories over Biarritz in December, winning 21–17 at home followed by a 6–10 victory away.

Following the Christmas break, an away 12–16 victory over Gloucester was recorded despite being reduced to 14 men after Tom James was sent-off for a head butt on Gloucester hooker Olivier Azam. In the final round of pool games a bonus point 62–20 win over Calvisano ensured that Cardiff Blues remained the only unbeaten team in the pool stages of the 2008–09 Heineken Cup and claimed the top seed position and a home quarter-final.

The quarter-final against eighth seed and three-times Heineken Cup winners Toulouse was played in the Millennium Stadium with another record attendance of 36,778. A 9–6 victory was recorded in a defence dominated game. The semi-final against Leicester Tigers was also hosted at the Millennium Stadium. Despite being 12–26 down with six minutes remaining, a mighty comeback tied the scores at 26–26 after 80 minutes and forced extra time.

With no further score in the 20 minutes of extra time, the game was forced into an historic penalty shootout. Cardiff were defeated 7–6 following missed kicks by Tom James and Martyn Williams.

==== Cardiff City Stadium ====
Despite the excitement on the field, off the field a drama had been playing out as the Cardiff Blues board put in place a plan to move from their historic home at Cardiff Arms Park and into the new Cardiff City Stadium. Supporters were alarmed by the supposed rental costs involved in using the new venue as well as moving away from what they regarded as their spiritual home.

More big name signings were made upon the move to the new stadium, including Casey Laulala and Sam Norton-Knight. Norton-Knight had the job of replacing fan favourite outside half Nicky Robinson who, along with his brother Jamie Robinson had chosen to leave Cardiff Blues that summer. However, Norton-Knight would struggle in the 10 shirt and would go down as Dai Young's biggest transfer mistake.

In the Celtic League, Cardiff Blues finished fifth in the table, one point away from the playoffs; but secured a place in the 2010–11 Heineken Cup as the second-placed Welsh team. Their Heineken Cup campaign ended after the pool stage, in which they finished second to Toulouse and were not one of the two top second-place teams.

However, this season was the first in which three-second-place teams from the Heineken Cup parachuted into the European Challenge Cup, and the Cardiff Blues were one of three teams to qualify. They crushed Newcastle Falcons 55–22 in the quarterfinals, and edged London Wasps 18–15 both on the road, to reach the final of the competition. The Cardiff Blues became the first Welsh side to win a European trophy after beating Toulon 28–21 in the final on 23 May at Stade Vélodrome in Marseille.

Off the field, the Cardiff Blues had a turnover of £8.7 million and a total employment bill of £5.6 million, with other costs including rental of the new stadium leading them to make a loss of more than £650,000.

Xavier Rush chose to sign a new contract with the club, despite having earlier agreed terms with Ulster. After a "change in his personal circumstances" Rush had decided to remain at the club he described as his "home from home" and a release from his two-year contract was negotiated with Ulster.

Further signings were made. Michael Paterson joined from the Super 14 side the Hurricanes. Press reports in New Zealand at the time of the signing indicated that he had been close to selection for the All-Blacks before choosing to join Cardiff. With the unsuccessful Sam Norton-Knight signing for the Sanyo Wild Knights after not making the grade at outside half, Dan Parks of Glasgow Warriors and a Scottish International was signed.

But the team were beginning to struggle on the field. They were runners up in their Heineken Cup pool but with not enough points to progress in either the Heineken or the Amlin Cups. In the Pro 12 they slipped to sixth place, missing out on a play-off spot.

Lower attendances and a failure to progress in either the Heineken Cup or Magners League meant turnover fell to £7.4m, while added player and coaching costs led to the total employment bill rising to £6.7m. The hefty financial costs attached to playing at Cardiff City Stadium were beginning to mount.

In June 2011, Dai Young would step down in order to join Wasps RFC, bringing an end to nine years as Head Coach and Director of Rugby after a playing career that had begun in 1988.

=== 2011–2021 ===
==== Return to the Arms Park ====
Dai Young's departure had coincided with financial losses at the Cardiff City Stadium beginning to bite. No new signings were made over the summer and Young's assistant coaches, Gareth Baber and Justin Burnell, were made caretaker coaches.

Mid season, long serving Chief Executive Robert Norster also left, to be replaced by Richard Holland. Gavin Henson would be signed on a short-term contract, only for it to be cancelled after an incident on an aircraft returning from a match in Scotland.

Despite some success in the Heineken Cup, beating Racing Metro and achieving a quarter final place, this was a season in which Cardiff Blues managed only 10 league wins. The season was marked by increased awareness of the impact financial pressures were having on the team since the move to Cardiff City Stadium.

The team would lose £3.83m over the 2011/12 season including a seven figure payment to cancel their lease agreement with Cardiff City. It was estimated that the rental agreement and other costs associated with using the stadium had been costing the club around £1 million a season.

Attendances declined further and supporters expressed their dissatisfaction. Two fixtures were moved back to Cardiff Arms Park with some success. The games against Connacht on 10 February 2012 and Ulster on 17 February 2012 achieved capacity crowds and proved popular with supporters.

It was decided that the team would return to Cardiff Arms Park permanently.

==== Phil Davies and "The Chief" ====
Upon returning to the Arms Park, the Cardiff Blues board decided that an experienced Director of Rugby was needed. Former Scarlets coach Phil Davies was appointed.

Over the next two seasons a number of long serving and high-profile players would retire or leave for other clubs, including Gethin Jenkins, T Rhys Thomas, Casey Laulala, Ben Blair, Martyn Williams, Xavier Rush, Paul Tito, Maama Molitika, Deiniol Jones, Jamie Roberts, Michael Paterson, Tom James, Leigh Halfpenny, Ceri Sweeney and Bradley Davies.

In Davies's first season Cardiff Blues managed only eight wins in the Pro12 and one in the Heineken Cup. They scored a mere 28 tries in the Pro12, the lowest in the league.

Problems with the Arms Park playing surface had also been an issue during the season. Over the following summer, money was invested in a new artificial playing surface.

Davies chose to appoint a diverse range of assistants. These included the 1980s Cardiff hero Mark Ring, Pontypridd icon Dale McIntosh (nicknamed "The Chief") and young former London Broncos coach Rob Powell. Ring's methods were regarded as outdated and Paul John instead came on board as the new backs coach.

After a home loss to Italian club Zebre and a heavy defeat in the Heineken Cup to Exeter, Phil Davies came under severe scrutiny and defence coach Powell promptly left the club. However, a victory over Heineken Cup champions Toulon, followed by back to back wins over Glasgow, briefly eased pressure on Davies. A further series of league defeats proved to be the final straw and Davies finally resigned. The remaining six matches of the season saw caretaker coaches John and McIntosh take the team on a four match unbeaten run which belatedly improved the team's league position.

==== Stay Strong for Ows ====
In June 2014, Cardiff were invited to send a squad to Singapore to compete in the inaugural World Club 10s. Tragically, during a third place play off match, young Cardiff centre Owen Williams suffered a significant injury to his cervical vertebrae and spinal cord. The injury ended Williams's rugby career and left him paralysed from the waist down.

Soon after the incident, the social media hashtag #staystrongforows became popularised and Williams received support from around the world. Fundraising efforts managed to secure for Williams a purpose-built house and the Stay Strong For Ows Foundation has continued to raise money and draw attention to the plight of players, who experience life changing injuries.

==== Mark Hammett ====
For the 2014/15 season, increased financial stability following the return to the Arms Park saw the board once more invest in the playing and coaching staff. Jarrad Hoeata and Gareth Anscombe were signed from New Zealand, and off the field, Kiwi coach Mark Hammett arrived after a controversial period coaching the Hurricanes in Super Rugby to become the new Director of Rugby.

Hammett's brief period in charge of the club was marked by unusual selections, insistence that players improve their fitness levels and frequent stories in the press about player dissatisfaction with his approach. Hammett would return to New Zealand before the end of the season, with "The Chief" and Paul John once more taking charge as caretaker coaches through to the end of the season.

==== Danny Wilson years ====
After three chaotic seasons, Cardiff were once again looking for a new coach. They now turned to the Bristol Bears assistant Danny Wilson. Wilson had begun his coaching career in the Cardiff Blues academy and had established a strong reputation as a forward specialist, and as Wales U20s head coach. Dale McIntosh - who had applied for the job himself - would leave soon after and be replaced as defence coach by former rugby league man Graham Steadman.

Billy Millard, who had been backs coach under Dai Young, also returned to take up the role of General Manager, a role designed to enable Wilson to focus on hand on coaching over "desk work".

Wilson found himself having to rebuild a squad that by then was a hotch potch of signings from various coaches. His team initially went on a nine match losing run. But in the second half of the season, Wilson had begun turning the team's fortunes around. An impressive away win against Scarlets was the high point in a run of strong performances that suggested Wilson was bringing much needed stability to the club. For his second season, Wilson was able to add strong new signings like Willis Halaholo and Nick Williams as well as replace Paul John with his former Bristol colleague Matt Sherratt.

Wilson also began bringing through a group of highly promising young players from the academy, including Rhun Williams, Seb Davies, Jarrod Evans and Tomos Williams.

==== Second season injury crisis ====
However, after a promising start to Wilson's second season, the team experienced a raft of injuries, beginning with a serious injury to fan favourite Dan Fish which would keep him out of rugby for much of the next three years. Key players including star outside half Anscombe, and much of the club's stable of backrow talents were also made unavailable through injury.

Nicky Robinson was called out of retirement as an emergency outside half signing and Sion Bennett also had to be signed as an emergency openside flanker due to the number of injuries in what was considered Cardiff Blues's strongest position.

Wilson's second season had proven to be disappointing. But as players returned from injury, performances (particularly a thumping 35–17 win over the Ospreys) once again began to improve toward end of season. Wilson looked to add experience to the squad and brought in South African Franco van der Merwe to strengthen the problematic second row position.

==== Decision to leave ====
Since returning to the Arms Park, the Cardiff Blues board had been negotiating with their main shareholder and landlord the Cardiff Athletic Club, over terms for a new lease at the Arms Park which would allow the board to put in place ambitious plans to redevelop the site and modernise the stadium.

These talks suddenly collapsed in 2017, leading to a sudden reduction in the wage bill at the Arms Park. This led to the recently arrived Van Der Merwe having to find a new club without playing a single match. Billy Millard also departed. Wilson was now having to fulfil Millard's former role alongside the Head Coach job, and also had only Sherratt and Richard Hodges alongside him as assistant coaches.

Wilson announced his decision to turn down the opportunity to stay at the Arms Park beyond the 2017/18 season. Initially he was set to join Wasps, ironically alongside Dai Young, but later would announce his decision to join Scotland as their new forwards coach.

==== Amlin Cup triumph ====
Wilson was a popular coach with the fans and announcement of his departure was greeted with frustration. The pessimistic mood was not helped by a series of poor results in the first half of the season.

In the second half of the season, once again performances turned around. After a run of strong displays in the Pro12, Wilson's team all but assured a return to Champions Cup rugby with a bonus point win over Ulster. Meanwhile, a strong campaign in the Challenge Cup, including away wins at Toulouse and Lyon, had seen them into the latter stages of that competition.

After a semi final win over Pau before a packed Arms Park, Cardiff Blues faced Gloucester at the final in Bilbao. A second half comeback and late penalty from Anscombe secured a dramatic win.

==== John Mulvihill years ====
The Cardiff Blues board struggled to replace Wilson. Geordan Murphy and Jim Mallinder were both reported to be close to securing the job but in the event did not take the role. The job eventually went to little known Australian coach John Mulvihill, who had spent much of his career coaching in Japan. Mulvihill had been highly recommended by Alec Evans, who had been a highly successful and respected coach at the Arms Park in the 1990s.

Mulvihill assembled a new coaching team of mostly young Welsh coaches recommended to him by the WRU. However his late arrival meant that Mulvihill was unable to make many changes to the playing squad. His first season included some notable wins over the Scarlets and Lyon and a narrow defeat to English giants Saracens, but after a mixed season Cardiff Blues had narrowly failed to remain in the Champions Cup for the following year.

==== Project reset ====
Off field, The WRU and Welsh professional teams had been negotiating over "Project reset", which had been intended to improve relations between the teams and the union, as well as change the way Welsh professional rugby was funded. However, these talks led to the sudden imposition of a transfer embargo for much of the 2019/20 season.

The embargo meant that although Mulvihill had secured the high-profile signings of Hallam Amos and Josh Adams for the following season, he was unable to strengthen his forward pack. The embargo also meant that Cardiff Blues could not offer a new contract to breakthrough academy prop Rhys Carre, who would as a result take up an offer from Saracens.

==== Changes at boardroom level ====
The "Reset" talks also resulted in major changes and a process of modernisation at board level. Peter Thomas stepped down after twenty years as chairman and became Life President while remaining on the board. Thomas would also write off £14 million of loans he'd made to the club since 1996. Fellow investor Martyn Ryan also wrote off a near seven figure sum. Long term board members Gareth Edwards and Paul Bailey also stepped aside to become Life Patrons.

The new chairman was Managing Partner of Law Firm Hugh James, Alun Jones and experienced business people Andrew Williams and Hayley Parsons would also join the board in the first major changes to the Cardiff Rugby Ltd board since its creation in 1997. Three years later, David Allen would become the board's first supporter advisor.

==== Covid 19 ====
Mulvihill's second season continued the mixed set of results experienced in his first season. This season was however to be curtailed by the COVID-19 pandemic. As with every other professional sports team, Cardiff Blues's future was now in jeopardy. Planning for future seasons was also curtailed with Mulvihill once again being unable to recruit significantly. As part of negotiations over necessary wage cuts, extended contracts were handed out to squad members.

Mulvihill remained in charge for the following season, which was to be played behind closed doors as the pandemic continued. With the Arms Park used as part of the Dragons Heart emergency hospital, Cardiff played home games at Rodney Parade in Newport as well as two matches back at Cardiff City Stadium.

Two and half years of taking charge of Cardiff Blues through an unprecedented level of off field disruption came to an end for Mulvihill on New Years Day 2021, when he left the club to return to his family in Australia.

=== 2021–present ===
==== Return of Dai Young ====
Young had ended his lengthy stay at Wasps early in 2020. Aware that he was now available, the Cardiff Blues board saw him as an ideal replacement for the departing Mulvihill. He signed an initial short-term contract, followed by a longer term one in April 2021.

Young improved the team's fortunes and secured a return to Champions Cup rugby with a defeat of Edinburgh. Like his predecessor, off field issues meant that he was unable to substantially change his squad.

==== Rebranding ====
On March 1, 2021, following discussions with supporter groups, the club announced a rebranding to Cardiff Rugby, dropping the Blues name and logo from August 1, 2021.

Chief Executive Richard Holland clarified the club's identity, explaining that "We are a club with regional responsibilities....There has always been this question mark over what purpose Blues serves. It's a suffix, at the end of the day, to Cardiff. This change is reaffirming who we are and being proud of that, while still continuing our regional duties. We believe it's the right decision. It's an exciting development for us as a company where we embrace the rich history and heritage of ourselves as a club."

Holland also clarified the position of the Cardiff RFC Premiership team after the rebrand, "Cardiff Rugby is the overarching brand that's going to encompass the pro team and the semi-pro team... Cardiff, as the Rags team, will play in the Premiership. There is no change with that." "

"Rags" was a reference to the traditional nickname for the Cardiff second XV. Following the rebrand, academy manager Gruff Rees became Director of Rugby of the Cardiff RFC XV and began a process Rees described as "full alignment with our academy".

Chairman Alun Jones further clarified, "What the rebrand does is to re-connect with our history. It's about having a clear identity."

==== The Champions Cup "Misfits" ====
Cardiff's 2021/22 season had begun steadily, with three wins and two close defeats in their first five URC matches. After the autumn internationals, the squad flew to South Africa for matches against the Lions and Stormers.

While there, news of the spread of the Omicron variant in South Africa forced the postponement of the matches. The entire squad was forced into quarantine, initially in South Africa and later at airport hotels in England.

Champions Cup matches against French champions Stade Toulousain and English champions Harlequins were now in doubt as Cardiff seemed unlikely to be able to raise a team from the few players who hadn't flown to South Africa. A total of 32 players and 10 members of staff had been on the trip and an additional 10 players were either injured or suspended.

Cardiff made the decision to fulfill the fixtures nevertheless. Gruff Rees was put in temporary charge of the team. In addition to the few players that had been left at home, he called upon members of the Cardiff RFC semi pro squad and added two experienced semi pro props from Aberavon RFC.

The team Rees dubbed his "misfits" therefore took the field against Toulouse at the Arms Park with a primary school teacher (Evan Yardley), groundsman (Rowan Jenkins) and recruitment consultant (Alex Everett) amongst the part time players in the 23 man squad. Before a rowdy Arms Park crowd and Channel 4's cameras, the team performed admirably and beyond expectations before going down to an Antoine Dupont inspired Toulouse team.

The following week, a similar squad, now with "Rags" Backs Coach Dan Fish - who had only recently retired from professional rugby - at outside half played Harlequins at the Stoop. Tries by academy players Cameron Winnett and Theo Cabango meant that the game was tied at 17 all at half time before Harlequins finally took control of the game away from the "misfits" in the second half. Fish's inspired performance was widely praised in the media and sealed his status as a cult hero among Cardiff supporters.

==== Passing of Peter Thomas ====
In March 2023, Cardiff's former Chairman and long term benefactor Peter Thomas passed away at the age of 79 after a long battle with cancer.

Thomas had played for the club in the 1960s and become Chairman in the 1990s. He had stepped down in 2018 but had remained the club's principal shareholder.

In tribute, the South stand at Cardiff Arms Park was renamed The Peter Thomas Stand. The renamed stand was unveiled on an emotional night at the Arms Park on which Cardiff defeated Sale in the last 16 of the European Challenge Cup.

==== Matt Sherratt ====
Summer 2023 was a turbulent time off the field. Together with the fallout from the passing of Peter Thomas, the club also had to contend with the implications of the controversial new PRA23 deal with the WRU and with the loss of coach Dai Young.

Numerous players left the club due to this accumulation of off field issues.

Backs coach Matt Sherratt was appointed the club's new Head Coach. With so many players leaving and with so many in international player camps for the 2023 Rugby World Cup, Sherratt was faced with having only 8 players available at the first preseason training season.

Sherratt was faced with rebuilding a player and coaching group from scratch. He was joined by Gethin Jenkins as defence coach and Scott Andrews as the sole forwards coach. The playing squad was added to with promotions from the club's academy.

In his first season, Cardiff only won four matches in the URC, but a series of spirited, attacking displays in defeat, notably in the Champions Cup versus Bath, saw crowds increase over the season as Sherratt reshaped the club's culture.

The following season, Sherratt was able to add several new players to his reshaped squad and took the club up to 9th in the URC table, missing out on the play offs by a point.

Recognised for his achievements in bringing through young players and building a healthy culture, Sherratt was made caretaker Wales coach for the second half of the 2025 6 Nations. He then became fulltime Wales attack coach alongside another former Cardiff coach in Danny Wilson.

==== Helford Capital ====
With the passing of Peter Thomas, the club and the Thomas family looked for new investment into the club.

Despite early interest from Ospreys owners Y11, it was decided to sell 84.55% of the club to investment group Helford Capital Ltd. Helford being an investment vehicle used by British businessmen Neal Griffith and Phillip Kempe.

Both Griffith and Kempe passed a due diligence test commissioned by the WRU. Although it was later revealed that a firm associated with Griffith, Optima Group, had gone into liquidation in 2021 owing creditors approximately £37,000,000.

The sale was approved by 99.9% of Cardiff shareholders, as well as Cardiff Athletic Club and the Welsh Rugby Union.

Prior to the deal, the club along with the other Welsh professional teams had signed the WRU's controversial PRA23 deal, which obliged each team to put forward an approved investor with the responsibility of each injecting over £1,000,000 a season into their teams. Helford took over this role from the Peter Thomas estate.

The deal was completed in January 2024.

However in April 2025, it was announced that Helford Capital "was unable to meet its obligations to fund the club as it was contractually obliged to do." As a direct result, the club was placed into administration. The assets and business were bought out of administration by the Welsh Rugby Union 24 hours later. The Union intended to sell to private investors at a later stage, but for the foreseeable future would run Cardiff as a WRU subsidiary.

==== Corniel Van Zyl ====
Van Zyl first joined Cardiff as forwards coach for the 2024/25 season. He was promoted to interim Head Coach for the following season.

Under his leadership, the club reached 6th in the URC table and made the play offs for the first time.

== World Rugby Hall of Fame ==
Cardiff are one of only three clubs to have been inducted into the World Rugby Hall of Fame. The club's innovation of the four three quarter system in 1885 was copied first by Wales and later spread throughout the rugby world, leaving a lasting mark upon the game. The club was inducted into the Hall of Fame in 2011.

In addition, eleven former Cardiff players have been inducted into the Hall of Fame:

- Gareth Edwards
- Cliff Morgan
- Frank Hancock
- Jonah Lomu
- Jack Matthews
- Bleddyn Williams
- Keith Rowlands
- Barry John
- Gerald Davies
- Gwyn Nicholls
- Johnny Williams

== Colours ==
The traditional Cardiff colours of blue and black were modelled on the colours used by Gonville and Caius College, Cambridge and remained in use by the team until 2006.

At that time, Cardiff Blues changed their playing strip in a decision widely interpreted as a move away from the old Cardiff RFC identity, as for the first time black was not included alongside the blue.

A variety of alternative colour designs have been used as change strips and for jerseys used in European rugby. A blue and gold jersey modelled on one worn by Aberdare RFC and created to raise money for the seriously injured Aberdare born Cardiff player Owen Williams proved popular and was worn in the 2018 European Challenge Cup final win in Bilbao.

Cardiff Rugby have now returned to their traditional colours of Cambridge blue and black, as of 2021.

== Sponsorship ==
The following companies have produced kits for the Cardiff Blues or sponsored the side at some point in their history since 2003.

Period	Kit manufacturer	Chest Sponsor	Back Sponsor	Sleeve Sponsor
2003–2004	Fila	BMI Baby	Brecon Carreg	HSS Hire
2004–2008	Canterbury	BMI Baby	Brecon Carreg	HSS Hire
2008–2014	Canterbury	EADS	Geldards LLP	HSS Hire & Nolan UPVC
2014–2017	Canterbury	Airbus	Capital Law	HSS Hire & CPS Homes
2017–2019	Canterbury	Land Rover	Capital Law	HSS Hire & High Motive
2019–2020	Macron	Land Rover	Capital Law	HSS Hire & High Motive
2020–2022	Macron	MSS	Hugh James & LexisNexis Risk Solutions	Cardiff University & High Motive & Indigo Group
2022–2024	Macron	MSS	Hugh James & LexisNexis Risk Solutions	High Motive & Indigo Group & Ogi & Land Rover
2024–2025	Macron	RSK	Hugh James & LexisNexis Risk Solutions & MSS	High Motive & Indigo Group
2025–	Macron	RSK	Hugh James & MSS	High Motive & Indigo Group

== Home ground ==
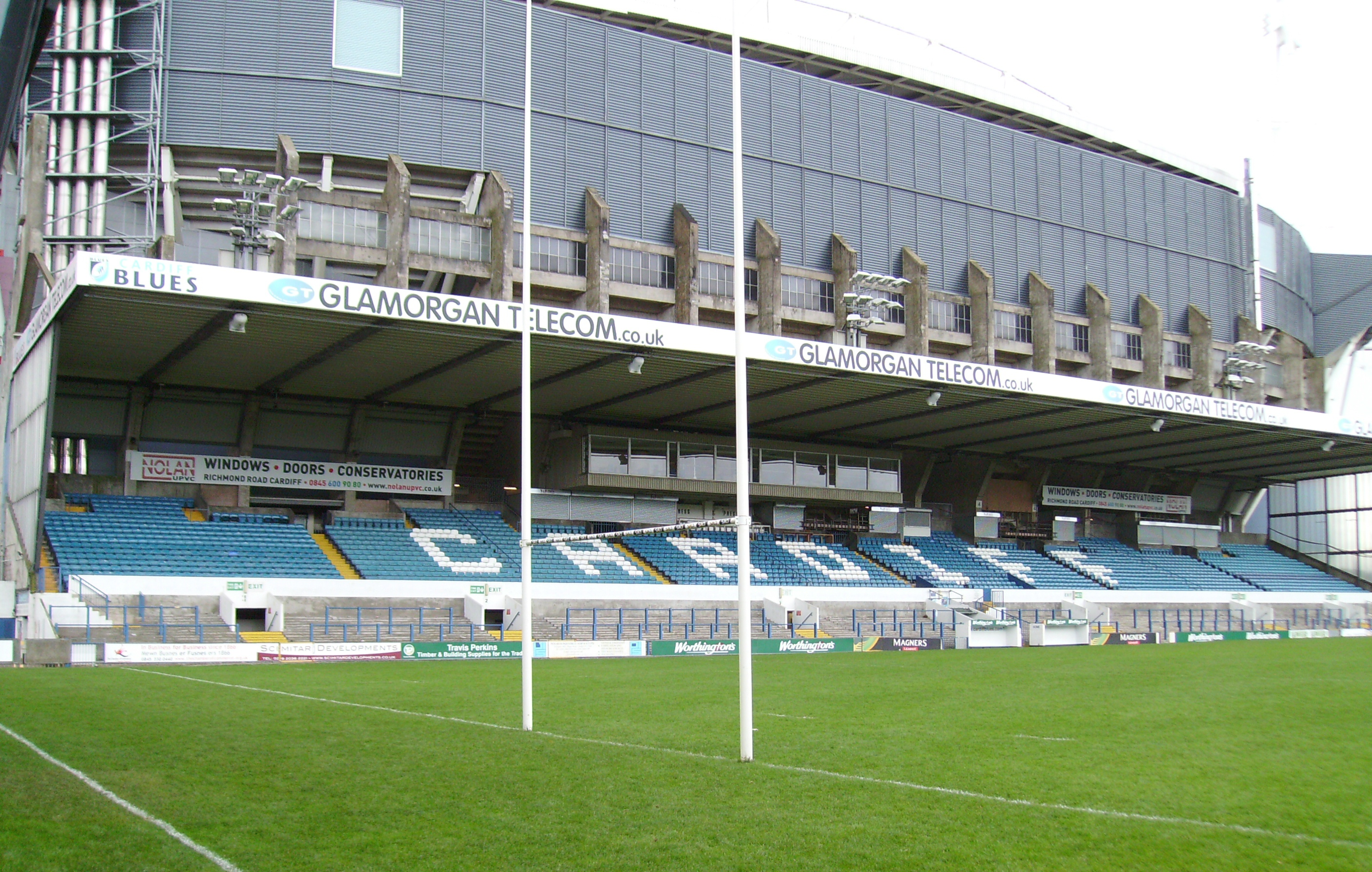

Cardiff Arms Park has been owned by Cardiff Athletic Club since the 1920s and has long been considered Cardiff Rugby's spiritual home. From the late 19th century onward, the Arms Park hosted both a cricket ground and a rugby ground until the southern side of the site was sold to the WRU in 1968. The northern side of the Arms Park then became Cardiff Rugby Club's home stadium, while the southern side was to become first the National Stadium and later the Principality Stadium. Cardiff have moved high-profile fixtures "next door" on a number of occasions, such as the 2008–09 Heineken Cup semi-final versus Leicester Tigers.

The Arms Park currently consists of two main stands, both with seated and terraced sections. At the east and west ends of the stadium are blocks of hospitality facilities and office space. The Cardiff Athletic Clubhouse sits next to the South Stand.

For three seasons from the beginning of the 2009–10 season the first team moved to the new Cardiff City Stadium at Leckwith. Financial pressures and supporter dissatisfaction led to several home games being moved back to the Arms Park in the 2011–12 season. On 8 May 2012 it was announced that the 20-year lease with Cardiff City F.C. had been broken by mutual consent following significant financial losses incurred as a result of the move. The club returned to the Arms Park from the 2012/13 season.

For the conclusion of the abbreviated 2019/20 season, and the start of the 2020/21 season, due to the COVID-19 pandemic and the use of Cardiff Arms Park as part of the Dragons Heart emergency hospital, Cardiff played some home games behind closed doors at Rodney Parade in Newport. The club also returned to Cardiff City Stadium for two matches behind closed doors during this period.

In 2022, it was announced that an extension to the lease at Cardiff Arms Park had been signed with Cardiff Rugby's main shareholder, Cardiff Athletic Club. Cardiff Athletic Club are exploring options for a refurbishment and redevelopment of the Arms Park stadium and wider site.

=== Attendances ===
Total, average and highest attendances in all competitions. Friendlies are not included.

(Crowd figures from before 2004/5 are often estimated and incomplete and are therefore unreliable.)

Season	Matches	Total	Average	Highest
2004–5	13	68,131	5,241	10,186
2005–6	14	114,459	8,176	15,327
2006–7	16	159,822	9,989	26,645
2007–8	13	115,269	8,867	12,532
2008–9	17	254,663	14,980	44,212
2009–10	15	150,647	10,043	16,341
2010–11	16	154,697	9,669	22,160
2011–12	16	114,067	7,129	10,660
2012–13	16	134,358	8,397	10,243
2013–14	16	131,398	8,212	12,125
2014–15	16	125,952	7,872	10,900
2015–16	14	111,494	7,964	11,720
2016–17	16	127,265	7,954	11,654
2017–18	18	162,813	9,045	11,723
2018–19	13	119,686	9,207	12,018
2019–20	9	63,814	7,090	12,125
2020–21	-	n/a	n/a	n/a
2021–22	10	78,190	7,819	10,075
2022-23	12	87,206	7,267	12,121
2023-24	11	101,670	9,243	20,167
2024-25	11	95,634	8,994	12,125

== Regional responsibilities ==
=== Clubs and Schools ===
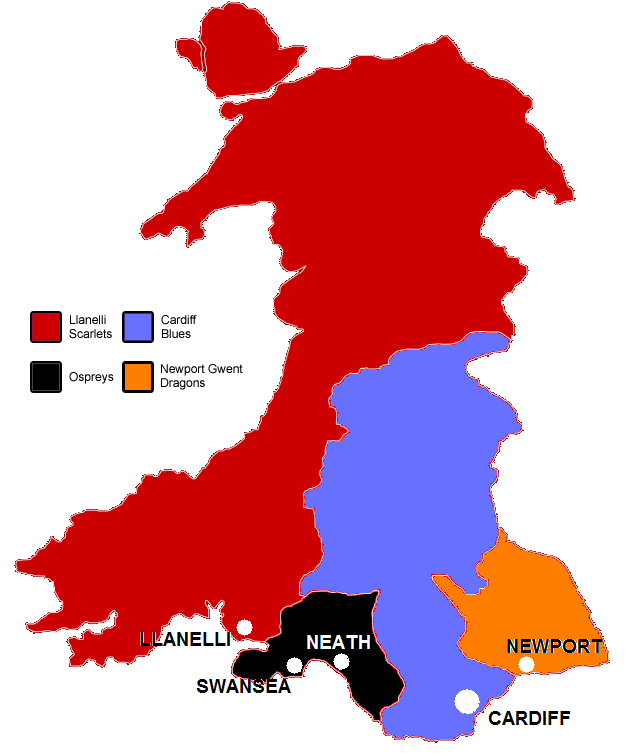
A map showing the Welsh rugby regions.

Cardiff Rugby are responsible for assisting the development of rugby in an area covering five unitary authorities: City of Cardiff, the Vale of Glamorgan, Rhondda Cynon Taff, Merthyr and southern Powys. This area includes 76 community clubs, 61 secondary schools and 320 Primary schools.

Tref-y-Clawdd RFC in Knighton on the border with Shropshire is the most northerly rugby club within this area, but the majority of clubs are based within the population centres of Cardiff and the communities to the immediate north and west of the city. They include Super Rygbi Cymru club Cardiff RFC, Welsh Premiership Merthyr RFC and Pontypridd RFC plus WRU Championship clubs Beddau RFC, Rumney RFC, St.Peters RFC, Cardiff Metropolitan University RFC, Glamorgan Wanderers RFC and Ystrad Rhondda RFC.

The club has close links with Coleg y Cymoedd, Cardiff and Vale College, Ysgol Gyfun Gymraeg Glantaf and Whitchurch High School, with all four playing in the WRU's elite Schools and Colleges League. The club has also formed a partnership with the fee paying Christ College Brecon and has formed links with Hartpury College in Gloucestershire.

The area also includes Cardiff Metropolitan University and Cardiff University, both leading University teams competing in BUCS Super Rugby in addition to the University of South Wales. Cardiff Academy players are often also students at these three universities.

=== Community Foundation ===
Cardiff Rugby Community Foundation are the charitable, not for profit community arm of the organisation. The Foundation delivers a range of programmes aimed at using rugby to make an impact upon communities both socially and economically.

Programmes include schools workshops, player visits, discounted rugby kits and rugby camps.

=== Age Group Rugby and Academy ===
At Under 16s level, two representative teams are selected (North and South) to compete in the RAG U16 Championship. At Under 18s level, Cardiff Rugby U18 compete in the RAG U18 league against similar teams from Scarlets, Ospreys, Dragons and RGC. Current Cardiff U18 Head Coach is Chad Mutyambizi.

High performing players from the U18 squad are offered Cardiff academy contracts. In recent years, the club has begun offering academy contracts to players at a younger age in an effort to retain players targeted by private schools and clubs in England.

The current Cardiff Academy manager is Gruff Rees who also serves as Director of Rugby of the Cardiff RFC Welsh Premiership team. Past graduates of the Cardiff academy system include Sam Warburton, Jamie Roberts, Tomos Williams, Leigh Halfpenny, Ellis Jenkins, Josh Navidi, and Rhys Patchell.

== Current standings ==
=== United Rugby Championship ===
Pos	Team	Pld	W	D	L	PF	PA	PD	TF	TA	TB	LB	Pts	Qualification
1	Glasgow Warriors	5	4	1	0	148	112	+36	22	15	5	0	23	Qualification for the Champions Cup and knockout stage
2	Bulls	5	4	0	1	214	106	+108	31	15	4	1	21	Qualification for the Champions Cup and knockout stage
3	Stormers	5	4	0	1	166	101	+65	24	14	4	1	21	Qualification for the Champions Cup and knockout stage
4	Sharks	5	4	0	1	140	107	+33	20	16	3	0	19	Qualification for the Champions Cup and knockout stage
5	Edinburgh	5	4	0	1	123	95	+28	17	12	3	0	19	Qualification for the Champions Cup and knockout stage
6	Leinster	5	3	0	2	149	81	+68	23	11	4	2	18	Qualification for the Champions Cup and knockout stage
7	Cardiff	5	3	0	2	113	107	+6	17	17	2	0	14	Qualification for the Champions Cup and knockout stage
8	Dragons	5	2	1	2	137	128	+9	20	20	3	1	14	Qualification for the Champions Cup and knockout stage
9	Ospreys	5	2	0	3	112	147	−35	18	21	3	0	11	Qualification for the Challenge Cup
10	Benetton	5	1	1	3	115	104	+11	16	17	2	3	11	Qualification for the Challenge Cup
11	Connacht	5	2	0	3	109	161	−52	18	24	2	0	10	Qualification for the Challenge Cup
12	Munster	5	1	1	3	93	113	−20	12	17	2	2	10	Qualification for the Challenge Cup
13	Lions	5	2	0	3	107	162	−55	15	25	1	0	9	Qualification for the Challenge Cup
14	Scarlets	5	1	0	4	134	191	−57	20	29	4	1	9	Qualification for the Challenge Cup
15	Ulster	5	0	2	3	121	160	−39	18	22	4	1	9	Qualification for the Challenge Cup
16	Zebre	5	0	0	5	93	199	−106	14	30	2	0	2	Qualification for the Challenge Cup

Updated to match(es) played on 2nd November 2026. Source: UnitedRugby.com
Rules for classification: Tiebreakers for teams tied on points: 1) Number of matches won 2) The difference between points for and points against 3) The number of tries scored 4) The most points scored 5) The difference between tries for and tries against 6) The fewest red cards received 7) The fewest yellow cards received.

2026–27 United Rugby Championship Regional Shield tables
(Ireland) Irish Shield
	Team	P	W	D	L	PF	PA	PD	TF	TA	TBP	LBP	Pts	Pos overall
1	(Ireland) Leinster	2	2	0	0	74	23	+51	11	3	2	0	10	6
2	(Ireland) Munster	2	0	1	1	44	50	–6	6	8	1	1	4	12
3	(Ireland) Ulster	1	0	1	0	26	26	0	4	4	1	0	3	15
4	(Ireland) Connacht	1	0	0	1	5	50	–45	1	7	0	0	0	11
(Italy) (Scotland) Italian x Scottish Shield
	Team	P	W	D	L	PF	PA	PD	TF	TA	TBP	LBP	Pts	Pos overall
1	(Italy) Benetton	2	1	0	1	51	36	+15	6	6	1	1	6	10
2	(Scotland) Glasgow Warriors	1	1	0	0	24	20	+4	4	2	1	0	5	1
3	(Scotland) Edinburgh	2	1	0	1	41	43	–2	6	6	1	0	5	5
4	(Italy) Zebre Parma	1	0	0	1	12	29	–17	2	4	0	0	0	16
(South Africa) South African Shield
	Team	P	W	D	L	PF	PA	PD	TF	TA	TBP	LBP	Pts	Pos overall
1	(South Africa) Bulls	1	1	0	0	57	15	+42	9	2	1	0	5	2
2	(South Africa) Stormers	1	1	0	0	39	22	+17	6	3	1	0	5	3
3	(South Africa) Sharks	1	0	0	1	22	39	–17	3	6	0	0	0	4
4	(South Africa) Lions	1	0	0	1	15	57	–42	2	9	0	0	0	13
(Wales) Welsh Shield
	Team	P	W	D	L	PF	PA	PD	TF	TA	TBP	LBP	Pts	Pos overall
1	(Wales) Ospreys	3	2	0	1	69	71	–2	11	10	2	0	10	9
2	(Wales) Cardiff	2	2	0	0	47	15	+32	7	2	1	0	9	7
3	(Wales) Dragons	3	1	0	2	83	95	–12	12	15	2	1	7	8
4	(Wales) Scarlets	2	0	0	2	41	59	–18	6	9	1	1	2	14
If teams are level at any stage, tiebreakers are applied in the following order: 1. number of matches won 2. the difference between points for and points against 3. the number of tries scored 4. the most points scored 5. the difference between tries for and tries against 6. the fewest red cards received 7. the fewest yellow cards received
Green background indicates teams currently leading the regional shield. Upon the conclusion of the regular season, these teams win their respective regional shields. (S) : URC Shield champion

== Ownership, management, and coaching ==
=== First team management ===
Position	Name
Team Manager	(Cyprus) Chris Dicomidis
Head coach	(South Africa) Corniel van Zyl
Defence Coach	(Wales) Gethin Jenkins
Attack Coach	(New Zealand) Daniel Bowden
Scrum Coach	(Wales) Scott Andrews
Backs Coach	(England) Jonny Goodridge
Kicking Coach	(Wales) Leigh Halfpenny
Head of S & C	(Wales) Ryan Campbell
S & C Coach	(Wales) James Nolan
Training Ground and Kit Manager	(Wales) Mike Bieri
Head of Performance Analysis	(Wales) Luc Thomas
Analyst	(Wales) Huw Rodgers
Head of Recruitment	(Wales) Darren Allinson
Head of Medical Services	(Wales) Dan Jones
Senior/LTI Rehabilitation Lead Physiotherapist	(Wales) Carys Moggridge
First Team Physio	(Wales) Conor Dunleavy
Lead Doctor	(Wales) Dr. Dan Vaughan

=== Previous head coaches ===
Name	Years
(Wales) Roy Bish	1965–1974
(Wales) John Evans	1974–1979
(Wales) John Ryan	1979-1981
(Wales) Roger Beard	1981-1988
(Wales) Gwilym Treharne	1988–1989
(Wales) Alan Phillips	1989–1992
(Australia) Alex Evans	1992–1996
(Wales) Terry Holmes	1996-1999
(Wales) Lynn Howells	1999-2001
(South Africa) Rudy Joubert	2001–2002
(Wales) Dai Young	2002–2011
(Wales) Gareth Baber, Justin Burnell (Caretakers)	2011–2012
(Wales) Phil Davies	2012–2014
(Wales) Paul John, Dale McIntosh (Caretakers)	2014
(New Zealand) Mark Hammett	2014–2015
(Wales) Paul John, Dale McIntosh (Caretakers)	2015
(England) Danny Wilson	2015–2018
(Australia) John Mulvihill	2018–2021
(Wales) Dai Young	2021–2023
(England) Matt Sherratt	2023–2025

=== Ownership and management ===
Position	Name
Life President	Gareth Edwards
Chairman	Scott Waddington
Managing Director	Jamie Muir
Director	Geraint John
Director	Steven King

Correct as of July 2026

In April 2025, the WRU took over ownership of Cardiff Rugby, with the stated intention of selling the club on to new investors within the next year.

After a bidding process, the WRU identified two credible bidders. They were Ospreys owners Y11 and a consortium led by former Cardiff director Martyn Ryan and Film Producers Niels Juul and Gareth West.

The WRU eventually opted for the controversial bid from Y11. It was assumed that this was motivated by a desire to reduce the number of Welsh professional sides, with Y11 in a position to help them toward this goal.

However, in April 2026 the WRU announced that they had been unable to reach agreement with Y11 and would now be holding on to ownership of Cardiff for the foreseeable future. Despite this, the Martyn Ryan consortium reiterated that they remained willing to purchase the club from the union.

Prior to these events, the ownership of Cardiff Rugby Ltd was held by a collection of shareholders, including the majority shareholders (Helford Capital) who assumed the shares of the family of Peter Thomas and other senior directors. Shares were also held by Cardiff Athletic Club and numerous minority shareholders including shares managed by the Supporters Trust, CF10.

After the professionalisation of Rugby Union, Cardiff Rugby was first established as a company in 1996. In 2003 a second company was formed as a dormant company in order to protect the intellectual property of the Cardiff Blues brand. This dormant company which has never traded exists to this day, resulting in some confusion.

As of 2025, Cardiff Rugby is now managed via a company formed in 2019.

== Current squad ==
2026-27 Cardiff squad
**Props**: (Wales) **Keiron Assiratti**; (Wales) Rhys Barratt; (Wales) Joe Cowell; (Scotland) **Javan Sebastian**; (Samoa) **Scott Sio**; (Wales) **Danny Southworth**; (Wales) **Sam Wainwright**; **Hookers**: (Wales) **Liam Belcher** **(c)**; (Wales) Dafydd Hughes; (Wales) **Evan Lloyd**; **Locks**: (Wales) Jonny Green; (England) **Josh McNally**; (Wales) George Nott; (Wales) **Rory Thornton**; (Wales) **Teddy Williams**	**Back row**: (Wales) **Taine Basham**; (Wales) **James Botham**; (Wales) Lucas de la Rua; (Wales) **Taulupe Faletau**; (Wales) Alun Lawrence; (Wales) **Alex Mann**; (Tonga) **Semisi Paea**; (Wales) Dan Thomas; **Scrum-halves**: (Wales) **Ellis Bevan**; (Wales) **Aled Davies**; (South Africa) Johan Mulder; **Fly-halves**: (Wales) **Ioan Lloyd**; (Wales) **Callum Sheedy**; (Wales) **Jarrod Evans**; (Wales) Harri Wilde	**Centres**: (Wales) Steffan Emanuel; (Wales) **Mason Grady**; (Namibia) **Le Roux Malan**; (Wales) **Ben Thomas**; **Wings**: (Wales) **Josh Adams**; (Wales) Theo Cabango; (Wales) Harri Millard; (England) Iwan Stephens *; **Fullbacks**: (Wales) **Jacob Beetham**; (Wales) Tom Bowen; (Wales) **Cameron Winnett**
**(c)** denotes the team captain. **Bold** denotes internationally capped players. * denotes players qualified to play for Wales on residency or dual nationality. Taking into account signings and departures ahead of 2026-27 season as listed on List of 2026-27 United Rugby Championship transfers. Source:

=== Senior Academy squad ===
2026–27 Cardiff Academy squad
**Props**: (Wales) Brayan Kamanga; (Wales) Cameron Tyler-Grocott; (Wales) Vinnay Cleak; (Wales) Isaac Jones; **Hookers**: (Wales) Tom Howe; **Second row**: (Wales) Harri Lewis; (Wales) Tom Cottle; (Wales) Gabe Williams; (Wales) Sonny Mccabe	**Back row**: (Wales) Evan Rees; (Wales) Liam Williams; (Wales) Alfie Prygodzicz; **Scrum-halves**: (Wales) Sion Davies; **Fly-halves**: (Wales) Harri Wilde; (Wales) Lloyd Lucas; (Wales) Ben Coomer	**Centres**: (Wales) Osian Darwin-Lewis; (Wales) Elijah Evans; (Wales) Ioan Leyshon; **Wings**: (Wales) Devon Morris; (Wales) Calen Edwards; (Wales) Harry Turner; **Full Backs**: (Wales) Matty Young; (Wales) Rhys Cummings
**(c)** denotes the team captain. **Bold** denotes internationally capped players. * denotes players qualified to play for Wales on residency or dual nationality. Taking into account signings and departures ahead of 2026-27 season as listed on List of 2026-27 United Rugby Championship transfers. Source:

== Notable players ==
=== Notable Welsh internationals ===
Players who have represented Wales and have played for Cardiff:

- Cory Allen
- Scott Andrews
- Gareth Anscombe
- Aled Brew
- Gareth Cooper
- Alex Cuthbert
- Kristian Dacey
- Bradley Davies
- Ben Evans
- Gavin Evans
- Jarrod Evans
- Rhys Gill
- Leigh Halfpenny
- Iestyn Harris
- Gavin Henson
- Cory Hill
- Tom James
- Gethin Jenkins
- Adam Jones
- Deiniol Jones
- WillGriff John
- Tavis Knoyle
- Owen Lane
- Dillon Lewis
- Max Llewellyn
- Craig Mitchell
- Scott Morgan
- Josh Navidi
- Rhys Patchell
- Mike Phillips
- Andy Powell
- Andries Pretorius
- Rhys Priestland
- Craig Quinnell
- Matthew Rees
- Richie Rees
- Jamie Roberts
- Jamie Robinson
- Nicky Robinson
- Tom Shanklin
- Robert Sidoli
- Robin Sowden-Taylor
- Ceri Sweeney
- Gareth Thomas
- T. Rhys Thomas
- Josh Turnbull
- Sam Warburton
- Liam Williams
- Lloyd Williams
- Martyn Williams
- Owen Williams
- Rhys Williams
- Tomos Williams
- John Yapp

=== Overseas internationals ===
The following is a list of Cardiff players who have represented other nations:

Union	Player	Year(s) they played for Cardiff
Argentina	Lucas González Amorosino	2014–2015
Argentina	Joaquín Tuculet	2014–2015
Australia	Matt Cockbain	2004
Australia	Sam Norton-Knight	2009–2010
Canada	Dan Baugh	2003–2006
Canada	Ed Fairhurst	2006–2007
Fiji	Mosese Luveitasau	2006–2007
Fiji	Campese Ma'afu	2012–2013
(Georgia (country)) Georgia	Anton Peikrishvili	2016–2018
Ireland	Ed Byrne	2024–2026
Ireland	Robin Copeland	2012–2014
Italy	Manoa Vosawai	2014–2016
Moldova	Dmitri Arhip	2018–2023
Namibia	Heino Senekal	2002–2004
Namibia	La Roux Malan	2026-
New Zealand	Ben Blair	2006–2012
New Zealand	Jarrad Hoeata	2014–2017
New Zealand	Casey Laulala	2009–2012
New Zealand	Jonah Lomu	2005–2006
New Zealand	Xavier Rush	2005–2012
New Zealand	Nick Williams	2016-2020
Samoa	Pele Cowley	2016–2017
Samoa	Rey Lee-Lo	2015–2025
Samoa	Filo Paulo	2019–2020
Samoa	Isaia Tuifua	2014
Samoa	Freddie Tuilagi	2005–2006
Samoa	Scott Sio (Note: Scott Sio was also capped by Australia prior to playing for Samoa)	2026-
Scotland	Luke Hamilton	2010–2014
Scotland	Dan Parks	2010–2012
Scotland	Javan Sebastian	2025–
South Africa	Pieter Muller	2003–2004
Tonga	Taufaʻao Filise	2005–2018
Tonga	Maama Molitika	2007–2012
Tonga	Lopeti Timani (Note: Lopeti Timani was also capped by Australia prior to playing for Tonga)	2022–2024
United States	Cam Dolan	2015–2017
United States	Samu Manoa	2018
United States	Kort Schubert	2004–2006
United States	Blaine Scully	2015–2019

=== British and Irish Lions ===
The following players have been selected to play for the British and Irish Lions touring squads while playing for Cardiff since 2003.

Year	Tour	Series result	Players
2005	New Zealand	0–3	Gethin Jenkins, Tom Shanklin, Martyn Williams
2009	South Africa	1–2	Leigh Halfpenny, Gethin Jenkins, Andy Powell, Jamie Roberts, Martyn Williams
2013	Australia	2–1	Alex Cuthbert, Leigh Halfpenny, Jamie Roberts, Sam Warburton
2017	New Zealand	1–1	Sam Warburton
2021	South Africa	1–2	Josh Adams, Josh Navidi

== Honours, results and statistics ==
=== Club honours ===
- Welsh Shield – 2022-23, 2024-25
- Anglo-Welsh Cup – 2008–09
- European Challenge Cup (2) – 2009–10 (first Welsh team to win a European Trophy), 2017–18
- Magners League - 2006-07 (runners up), 2007-08 (runners up)

=== Celtic League / Pro12 / Pro14 / United Rugby Championship ===
Season	Played	Won	Drawn	Lost	Bonus	Points	Position
2003–04	22	11	0	11	10	54	6th
2004–05	20	8	1	11	6	40	9th
2005–06	22	11	0	9	11	63	4th (Note: 11 teams were involved in this season, so one team did not play each week and were awarded 4 points instead. Therefore, each team finished the season with 8 more points than the table would seem to warrant.)
2006–07	20	13	1	6	9	63	2nd
2007–08	18	12	0	6	8	56	2nd
2008–09	18	8	1	9	4	38	6th
2009–10	18	10	0	8	4	44	5th
2010–11	22	13	1	8	6	60	6th
2011–12	22	10	0	12	10	50	7th
2012–13	22	8	0	14	6	38	9th
2013–14	22	8	1	13	7	41	7th
2014–15	22	7	1	14	5	35	10th
2015–16	22	11	0	11	12	56	7th
2016–17	22	11	1	10	7	53	7th
2017–18	21	11	0	10	10	54	4th (Conference A)
2018–19	21	10	0	11	14	54	5th (Conference A)
2019–20	15 (Note: Only 15 rounds were played during the 2019–20 season due to the COVID-19 pandemic in Europe.)	7	0	8	5	33	6th (Conference A)
2020–21	16 (Note: Only 16 rounds were played during the 2020–21 season due to the COVID-19 pandemic in Europe, with the remaining matches replaced by the Pro14 Rainbow Cup competition.)	8	0	8	4	36	4th (Conference B)
2021–22	18	7	0	11	4	32	14th
2022–23	18	9	0	9	8	44	10th
2023–24	18	4	1	13	14	32	12th
2024–25	18	8	1	9	13	47	9th
2025–26	18	11	0	7	11	55	6th
2025–26	Quarter-final	Stormers 44 – 21 Cardiff Rugby					

=== Celtic Cup ===
Season	Round	Match
2003–04 (Note: Did not qualify for the 2004–05 Celtic Cup. The tournament was stopped after the 2004–05 season.)	Quarter-final	Edinburgh Rugby 33 – 16 Cardiff Blues

=== Heineken Cup / Rugby Champions Cup ===
Season	Pool	Played	Won	Draw	Loss	BP	Points	Place
2003–04	3	6	2	0	4	3	11	3rd
2004–05	6	6	1	0	5	3	7	4th
2005–06	2	6	3	0	3	3	15	3rd
2006–07	4	6	2	0	4	1	9	3rd
2007–08	3	6	4	1	1	2	20	1st
2007–08	Quarter-final	Toulouse 41 – 17 Cardiff Blues						
2008–09	6	6	6	0	0	3	27	1st
2008–09	Quarter-final	Cardiff Blues 9 – 6 Toulouse						
2008–09	Semi-final	Cardiff Blues 26 – 26 (6–7 penalties) Leicester Tigers						
2009–10	5	6	4	0	2	2	18	2nd
2010–11	1	6	3	0	3	2	14	2nd
2011–12	2	6	5	0	1	1	21	2nd
2011–12	Quarter-final	Leinster 34 – 3 Cardiff Blues						
2012–13	6	6	1	0	5	2	6	3rd
2013–14	2	6	3	0	3	2	14	2nd
2018–19	3	6	2	0	4	2	10	3rd
2021–22	B	4	1	0	3	3	7	9th
2023–24	B	4	0	0	4	3	3	6th

=== European Rugby Challenge Cup ===
Season	Pool	Played	Won	Draw	Loss	BP	Points	Place
2009–10	Quarter-final	Newcastle Falcons 20 – 55 Cardiff Blues						
2009–10	Semi-final	London Wasps 15 – 18 Cardiff Blues						
2009–10	Final	Cardiff Blues 28 – 21 Toulon						
2014–15	1	6	5	0	1	4	24	2nd
2014–15	Quarter-final	Newport Gwent Dragons 25 – 21 Cardiff Blues						
2015–16	3	6	3	0	3	5	17	3rd
2016–17	4	6	5	0	1	2	22	2nd
2016–17	Quarter-final	Gloucester 46 – 26 Cardiff Blues						
2017–18	2	6	5	0	1	1	21	1st
2017–18	Quarter-final	Edinburgh 6 – 20 Cardiff Blues						
2017–18	Semi-final	Cardiff Blues 16 – 10 Pau						
2017–18	Final	Cardiff Blues 31 – 30 Gloucester						
2019–20	5	6	3	0	3	6	18	3rd
2020–21	A	2 (Note: Only 2 rounds of the preliminary stage were played before suspension due to new restrictions surrounding the COVID-19 pandemic in Europe. A revised format to finish the competition involving the top 8 teams from the preliminary stage and knocked out teams from the Champions Cup was played thereafter.)	2	0	0	1	9	2nd
2020–21	Last 16	London Irish 41 – 35 Cardiff Blues						
2022–23	A	4	3	0	1	3	15	3rd
2022–23	Last 16	Cardiff Rugby 28 – 27 Sale Sharks						
2022–23	Quarter-final	Benetton 27 – 23 Cardiff Rugby						
2024–25	1	4	1	0	3	3	7	4th
2024–25	Last 16	Connacht 35 – 20 Cardiff Rugby						
2025–26	3	4	2	0	2	2	10	4th
2025–26	Last 16	Benetton 38 – 35 Cardiff Rugby						

=== Anglo-Welsh Cup ===
Season	Group/Round	Pos	Played	Won	Drawn	Lost	Bonus	Points
2005–06	Group B	2nd	3	1	0	2	2	6
2006–07	Group B	1st	3	3	0	0	1	13
2006–07	Semi-final	Cardiff Blues 10–27 Ospreys						
2007–08	Group B	2nd	3	2	0	1	1	9
2008–09	Group B	1st	3	3	0	0	0	12
2008–09	Semi-final	Cardiff Blues 11–5 Northampton Saints						
2008–09	Final	Cardiff Blues 50–12 Gloucester						
2009–10	Pool 3	1st	4	3	0	1	3	15
2009–10	Semi-final	Cardiff Blues 18–29 Gloucester						
2010–11	Pool 1	3rd	4	0	1	3	0	2
2011–12	Pool 2	3rd	4	1	0	3	1	5
2012–13	Pool 2	3rd	4	2	0	2	1	9
2013–14	Pool 2	3rd	4	2	0	2	2	10
2014–15	Pool 2	2nd	4	3	0	1	1	13
2016–17	Pool 3	4th	4	0	0	4	2	2
2017–18	Pool 1	4th	4	0	0	4	0	0

== EPCR milestones ==
In 2004 Cardiff Blues received the ERC Elite Award for having played 50 games in the Heineken Cup. This record began in 1995 when Cardiff RFC recorded an away draw at Bordeaux, and continued following the reorganisation of Welsh rugby in 2003.

As of 2022, Cardiff Rugby have played 124 matches in European Competition, making them joint 8th (with ASM Clermont Auvergne) on the all-time list.

Rhys Williams has made more appearances for Cardiff in the top tier of European Cup Rugby than any other player with 78 appearances. Martyn Williams appeared 85 times in European competition, with 17 of his appearances coming with Pontypridd RFC.

Rhys Williams is also Cardiff's top try scorer in the competition with 22.

== See also ==
- Rugby union in Wales
- Rugby in Cardiff
