= John Mulvihill (rugby union) =

- Born: 1966 or 1967 (age 59–60) Australia

Rugby union career
- Position: Fly-half
Coaching career
- Years: Team
- 1998-2003: Navan
- 2003-2005: Gold Coast Breakers
- 2005–2009: Western Force (assistant)
- 2009 - 2010: Mitsubishi Sagamihara DynaBoars
- 2010-2017: Kintetsu Liners
- 2017-2018: Honda Heat (Backs coach)
- 2017: Barbarians (assistant)
- 2018–2021: Cardiff Blues
- 2021–2022: CSKA Moscow

John Mulvihill (born 1966) is an Australian professional rugby union football coach. He was previously head coach at the Cardiff Blues and assistant coach at Honda Heat and Western Force.
