= Alan Phillips (rugby union) =

British Lions & Wales international rugby union footballer

Alan Phillips MBE
- Born: Alan John Phillips; 21 August 1954 (age 72) Bridgend, Wales
- School: Cynfig Comprehensive

Rugby union career
- Position: Hooker
Senior career
Years	Team	Apps	(Points)
1973-1992	Cardiff	481	(810)
International career
Years	Team	Apps	(Points)
1979-1987	Wales	18	(0)

Alan John Phillips (born 21 August 1954) is a former Wales international rugby union player and manager. A hooker, he played his club rugby for Cardiff RFC his modern game of forward play being so impressive that Cardiff selectors played him straight out of youth rugby (Kenfig Hill RFC). Phillips scored 162 tries in 481 appearances for Cardiff RFC. He was club captain at Cardiff 1985-87.

He toured South Africa with the British & Irish Lions in 1980 and was in the Wales squad for the 1987 Rugby World Cup. He won 18 caps for Wales between 1979 – 1987.

Phillips was Wales Team Manager from the Autumn of 2002 to 2019. Wales won three Grand Slams with Phillips as Team Manager (2005, 2008 & 2012).
