= Goode Bryan =

Confederate Army general (1811–1885)

- Born: August 31, 1811; Hancock County, Georgia
- Died: August 16, 1885 (aged 73); Augusta, Georgia
- Burial place: Magnolia Cemetery Augusta, Georgia
- Military career
- Allegiance: United States of America; Confederate States of America
- Branch: United States Army; Confederate States Army
- Service years: 1834–1835; 1846–1847 (USA); 1861–1864 (CSA)
- Rank: 2nd Lieutenant (USA); Major (USV); Colonel (Alabama Militia); Brigadier General (CSA)
- Units: 5th U.S. Infantry; 1st Alabama Volunteers (USV)
- Commands: 16th Georgia Infantry; Bryan's Brigade
- Conflicts: Mexican–American War; American Civil War: Peninsula Campaign; Second Battle of Bull Run; Battle of Fredericksburg; Battle of Chancellorsville; Gettysburg campaign; Mine Run Campaign; Battle of Chickamauga; Overland Campaign; Battle of the Wilderness; Battle of Cold Harbor; Siege of Petersburg

Goode Bryan (August 31, 1811 – August 16, 1885) was a planter, politician, military officer, and American Civil War general in the Confederate States Army. His brigade played a prominent role during the Battle of the Wilderness, fighting stubbornly until exhausting its ammunition.

== Early life and career ==
Bryan was born in Hancock County, Georgia. Through his great-great-great-grandmother Elizabeth Thynne, Viscountess Weymouth he was descended from Lionel Sackville, 1st Duke of Dorset, Charles Sackville, 6th Earl of Dorset and Richard Sackville, 5th Earl of Dorset. His fourth great grandmomther was Elizabeth Sackville, Duchess of Dorset. He was appointed to the United States Military Academy, graduating 25th of 36 in the Class of 1834. He was appointed a brevet second lieutenant in the 5th U.S. Infantry. However, he resigned his commission after only ten months in the army and moved back to Georgia to pursue a vocation as a planter. He later moved to Tallapoosa County, Alabama, and studied law. He briefly entered politics, serving in the Alabama general assembly in 1843. In June 1846, Bryan joined the 1st Alabama Volunteer Infantry as its major. He served in the Mexican–American War, seeing action at a number of battles. After the war, he resumed his law practice before returning to Georgia and farming. He married Anna Twiggs, daughter of a prominent Virginia planter. In 1859, their daughter Sarah was born.

== Civil War ==
Bryan served as a delegate to the Georgia secession convention in 1861. Enlisting in the Confederate Army, he was named a captain in the 16th Georgia Volunteer Infantry before being promoted to lieutenant colonel. On February 15, 1862, he became the regiment's colonel and led it during the subsequent Peninsula Campaign, Second Battle of Bull Run, Fredericksburg, Chancellorsville, and the Gettysburg campaign. During the Battle of Gettysburg, the 16th Georgia was among the troops that were poised for a late attack on a perceived weak spot in the Union line near Little Round Top, but were recalled by Lt. Gen. James Longstreet. To his dying day, Bryan remained bitter, convinced that his men could have moved forward and won the battle.

He was promoted to brigadier general on August 29, 1863, to replace the deceased Paul Jones Semmes and commanded the brigade during the Mine Run Campaign. In September 1863, Bryan's Brigade traveled with James Longstreet to Georgia to reinforce the Army of Tennessee and they fought in the Battle of Chickamauga and the Knoxville Campaign. In the spring of 1864, they returned to the Army of Northern Virginia before the start of the Overland Campaign. Bryan fought at Cold Harbor and the beginning of the Siege of Petersburg. On September 20, 1864, he resigned his commission due to chronic ill health and returned home to Georgia.

== Postbellum activities ==
After the war, with his health never again the same, Bryan lived a quiet life in Augusta, Georgia. Northern visitors remarked in the 1880s that "his manners were impeccable." He helped establish the Confederate Survivors Association, serving as the chairman of its first organizational meeting.

Bryan died in Augusta and was interred in the city's Magnolia Cemetery, where six other Confederate generals are also buried.

== See also ==
- List of American Civil War generals (Confederate)
- List of signers of the Georgia Ordinance of Secession
