= Grace Sackville, Countess of Middlesex =

Grace Sackville
- Countess of Middlesex
- Born: Hon. Grace Boyle; 1723; London
- Died: 10 May 1763 (aged 39–40)
- Noble family: Boyle
- Spouse: Charles Sackville, 2nd Duke of Dorset
- Father: Richard Boyle, 2nd Viscount Shannon
- Mother: Grace Senhouse
- Occupation: Mistress of the Robes to Princess Augusta of Saxe-Gotha

Grace Sackville, Countess of Middlesex (1723 – 10 May 1763), formerly the Hon. Grace Boyle, was the wife of Charles Sackville, Earl of Middlesex and later 2nd Duke of Dorset.

Grace was born in London, the daughter and sole heir of Richard Boyle, 2nd Viscount Shannon, and his wife Grace. She inherited the family seat of Ashley Park following her father's death in 1740.

She married the Earl of Middlesex in 1744, but he did not inherit his father's title of Duke of Dorset until after her death. The couple had no children. From 1747 to 1763, the countess held the position of Mistress of the Robes to Augusta of Saxe-Gotha, the Princess of Wales. She also succeeded Jane, Lady Archibald Hamilton as first Lady of the Bedchamber to the Princess of Wales from 1743 till her death. Her husband was a friend of Frederick, Prince of Wales, and the countess was rumoured to have been the prince's mistress.

When her mother died in 1755, the countess arranged a memorial, designed by Louis François Roubiliac, to her parents, which was erected at St Mary's parish church in Walton-on-Thames. The countess was something of an artist and may have been a pupil of the painter Arthur Pond.

On her death, the countess left Ashley Park not to her husband but to a cousin, Colonel John Stephenson.
