= Richard Boyle, 2nd Viscount Shannon =

British army officer and politician

Field Marshal The Right Honourable The Viscount Shannon PC
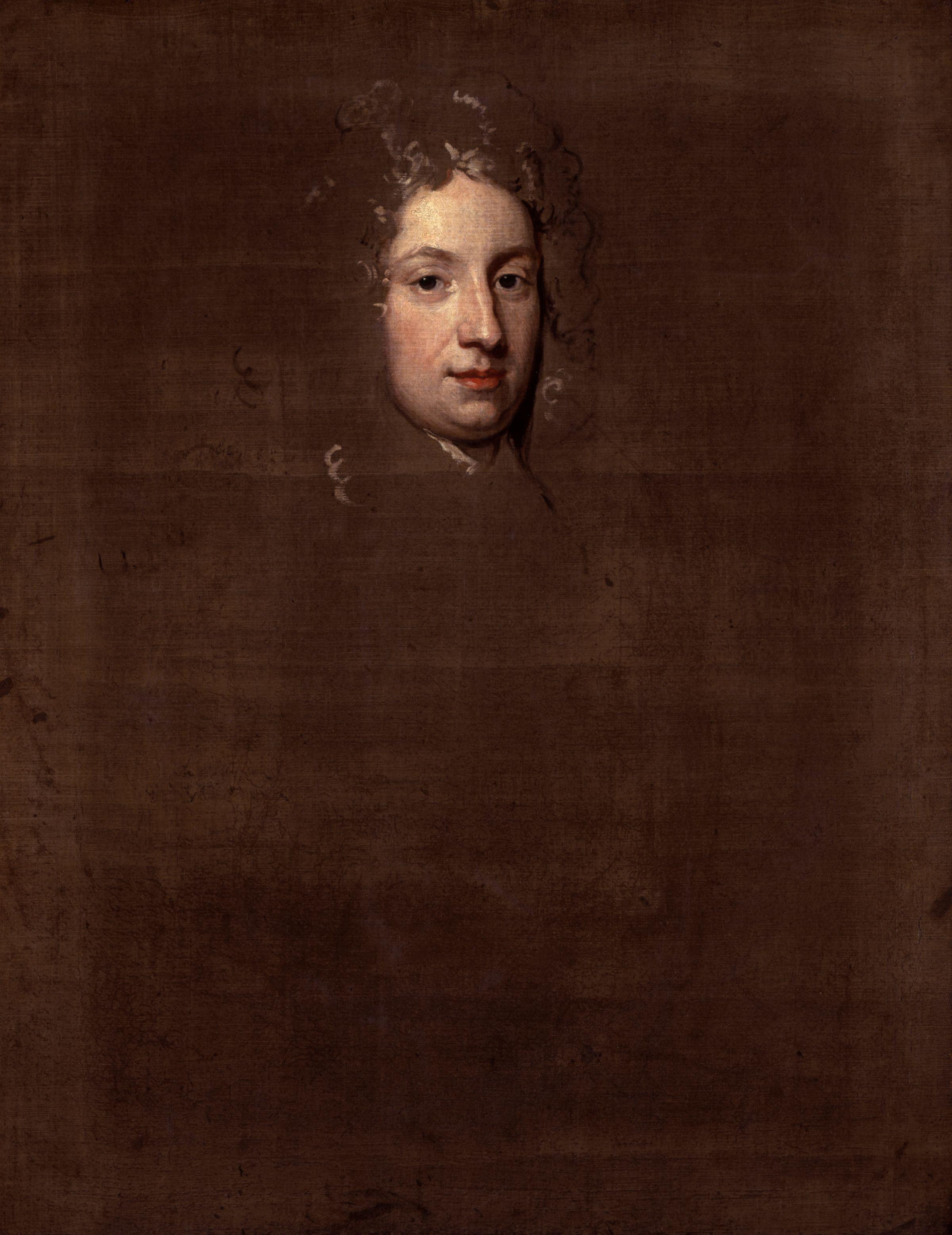
- Portrait by Sir Godfrey Kneller, c. 1710
- Born: 1675; Westminster, England
- Died: 20 December 1740 (aged 65); Ashley Park, Walton-on-Thames, England
- Burial place: St Mary's Parish Church, Walton-on-Thames
- Children: Grace
- Military career
- Allegiance: England; Great Britain
- Branch: English Army; British Army
- Service years: 1690–1740
- Rank: Field Marshal
- Commands: Commander-in-Chief, Ireland
- Conflicts: Williamite War in Ireland; Nine Years' War; War of the Spanish Succession

Field Marshal Richard Boyle, 2nd Viscount Shannon, PC (1675 – 20 December 1740) was a British army officer and politician. After serving as a junior officer at the Battle of the Boyne during the Williamite War in Ireland and at the Battle of Landen during the Nine Years' War, he commanded a brigade of grenadiers during the storming of Vigo during the War of the Spanish Succession. During this engagement the entire French-Spanish fleet was either captured or destroyed. He also took part in a successful raid on Barcelona three years later. He went on to serve as Commander-in-Chief, Ireland during the 1720s and 1730s.

== Military career ==
=== Early career ===
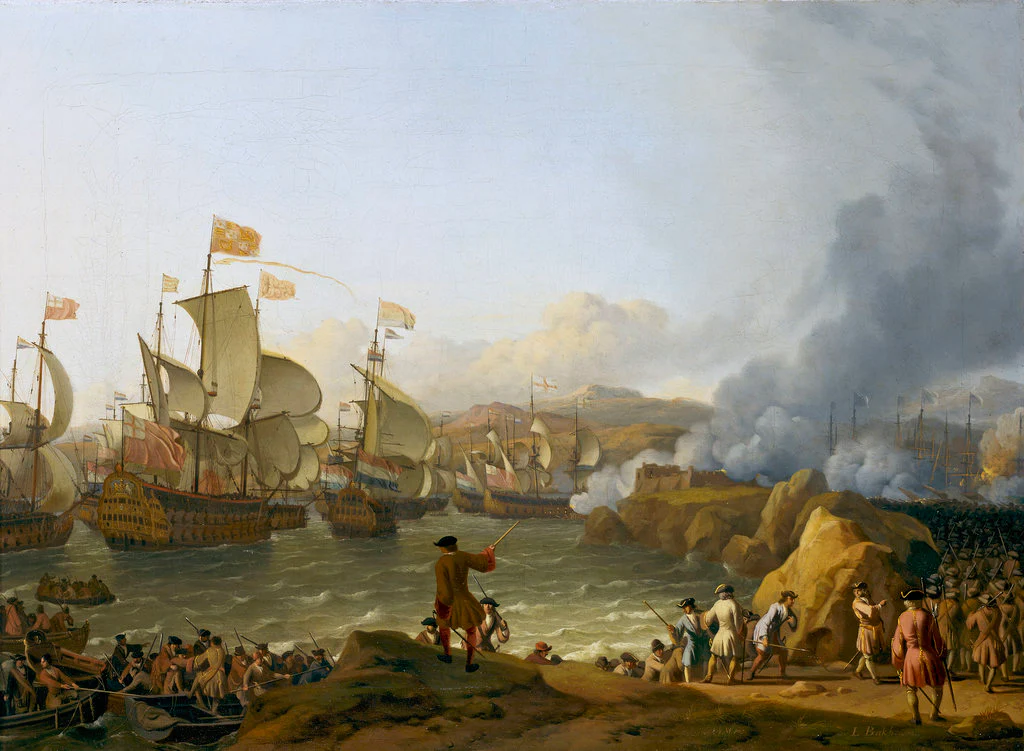
The storming of Vigo during the War of the Spanish Succession

Born the son of Richard Boyle (born circa 1640) and Elizabeth Boyle (née Ponsonby, daughter of Sir John Ponsonby of Bessborough), Boyle was educated at the University of Oxford. He started his military career as a volunteer in the service of the Duke of Ormonde at the Battle of the Boyne in July 1690 during the Williamite War in Ireland. He also fought, being wounded and becoming a prisoner of war, at the Battle of Landen in July 1693 during the Nine Years' War. He was commissioned as a junior officer in Ormonde's Troop of Horse Guards and cornet in the Army on 16 February 1694 and was promoted to cornet in his regiment and major in the Army in 1697.

Boyle succeeded his paternal grandfather as 2nd Viscount Shannon of the Peerage of Ireland in 1699. He became colonel of Prince George of Denmark's Regiment of Marines in February 1702 and commanded a brigade of grenadiers during the storming of Vigo in October 1702 during the War of the Spanish Succession. During this engagement the entire French fleet, under the command of the Marquis de Château-Renault, together with the Spanish galleons and transports under Manuel de Velasco, were either been captured or destroyed. For his good conduct at Vigo, Boyle was sent home to present the despatches, which reported on the destruction of the French fleet, to Queen Anne. She rewarded him with a gratuity of £1,000. However, in January 1703 he was accused of being involved in some scandalous activity at St James's Church, Piccadilly.

Promoted to brigadier-general in 1704, Boyle took part in a successful raid on Barcelona in 1705; he was again sent home to present the despatches. Queen Anne rewarded him with another gratuity. Promoted to major-general in 1708, he became Joint Controller for Clothing the Army that year. He also entered the House of Commons in 1708 as Member of Parliament (MP) for Arundel. His brief membership of the Kit-Cat Club, which met at the Trumpet tavern in London, gave him useful access to ministers and other key influencers including the Earl of Scarborough who had nominated him as a candidate for his seat in Parliament. At this time he was said to have had "an openness and frankness in his conversation which are highly engaging". In Parliament he supported the Whigs and voted for the Foreign Protestants Naturalization Act 1708 which allowed Protestants fleeing from the continent to enter Great Britain.

Promoted to lieutenant general in 1709, Boyle became Deputy Governor of Dover Castle later that year and was then given command of a secret but abortive expedition to attack New France in 1710. As the Earl of Scarborough was no longer in a position to nominate both members for Arundel, Boyle changed constituency to Hythe for which seat he was nominated by Lionel Sackville, 1st Duke of Dorset, in 1710. In Parliament, in accordance with Whig party policy, he voted for the impeachment of Henry Sacheverell, a clergyman who had criticised the party, in March 1710.

=== Later career ===
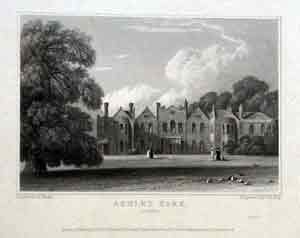
Ashley House, Ashley Park – image extracted from page 146 of volume 4 of "Views of the Seats of Noblemen and Gentlemen in England, Wales, Scotland and Ireland. L.P", drawn by John Preston Neale in 1818.

Boyle became colonel of the Viscount Shannon's Regiment of Foot in January 1715 and changed constituency again to East Grinstead later that year. He joined the army staff in Ireland in 1716.

Boyle became Commander-in-Chief, Ireland in 1720 and retained that command for the rest of his life. In June 1721 Richard Waring sold the colonelcy of the King's Regiment of Carabineers to Boyle for £7,500. Boyle also became a member of the Privy Council of Ireland in 1721 and one of the Lord Justices in Ireland in 1722. Awarded the Freedom of the City of Cork in 1722, he was ousted from his seat in Parliament as a result of a petition but regained his seat again in a by-election later that year.

Boyle became colonel of the 4th Troop of Horse Guards in March 1727 and was promoted to general of horse on 18 December 1735. He became Governor of Portsmouth in 1737 before being promoted to field marshal on 17 July 1739.

Boyle died at his home, Ashley Park at Walton-on-Thames, on 20 December 1740, and was buried at St Mary's Parish Church in Walton-on-Thames. There is a monument to him in the church.

== Family ==
On 6 June 1704, Boyle married Mary Sackville, illegitimate daughter of Charles Sackville, 6th Earl of Dorset and widow of Lionel Boyle, 3rd Earl of Orrery, who died twelve years later, bearing no children. In January 1720, Boyle remarried, this time to Grace Senhouse, daughter of John Senhouse of Netherhall in Cumbria; they had one child, Grace Sackville, Countess of Middlesex.

== Sources ==
- Barnard, Toby (2004). A New Anatomy of Ireland: The Irish Protestants, 1649–1770. Yale University Press. ISBN 978-0300101140.
- Budgell, Eustace (1732). Memoirs of the Life and Character of the Earl of Orrery and of the Family of the Boyles. London.
- Cruickshanks, Eveline (2002). The House of Commons, 1690–1715, Volume 2. Cambridge University Press. ISBN 978-0521772211.
- Heathcote, Tony (1999). The British Field Marshals 1736–1997. Pen & Sword Books Ltd. ISBN 0-85052-696-5.

Parliament of Great Britain
| Preceded by Edmund Dummer; James Butler | Member of Parliament for Arundel; 1708–1710; With: Sir Henry Peachey 1708; Viscount Lumley 1708–1710 | Succeeded by The Earl of Thomond; Viscount Lumley |
| Preceded by John Boteler; John Fane | Member of Parliament for Hythe; 1710–1711; With: John Fane | Succeeded by John Boteler; William Berners |
| Preceded by John Conyers; Spencer Compton | Member of Parliament for East Grinstead; 1715–1722; With: John Conyers | Succeeded by John Conyers; Sir Spencer Compton |
| Preceded by John Conyers; Sir Spencer Compton | Member of Parliament for East Grinstead; 1722–1734; With: John Conyers 1722–1725; Edward Conyers 1725–1727; The Viscount Palmerston 1727–1734 | Succeeded by Edward Conyers; Earl of Middlesex |
Military offices
| New regiment | Colonel of The Viscount Shannon's Regiment of Marines; 1702–1713 | Regiment disbanded |
| Preceded by William Breton | Colonel of The Viscount Shannon's Regiment of Foot; 1715–1721 | Succeeded by John Middleton |
| Preceded by Richard Waring | Colonel of The King's Regiment of Carabineers; 1721–1727 | Succeeded by George MacCartney |
| Preceded by The Lord Forrester | Captain and Colonel of the 4th Troop of Horse Guards; 1727–1740 | Succeeded by The Earl of Effingham |
| Preceded by The Lord Tyrawley | Commander-in-Chief, Ireland; 1721–1740 | Succeeded by Gervais Parker |
| Preceded by The Duke of Argyll | Governor of Portsmouth; 1737–1740 | Succeeded by Philip Honywood |
Peerage of Ireland
| Preceded by Francis Boyle | Viscount Shannon; 1699–1740 | Extinct |
