= Walton Court =

Walton Court may refer to:

- Walton Court, Aylesbury
- Walton Court, Walton-on-Thames
