= Duchess Anne =

Duchess Anne may refer to:

- Anne-Louise-Bénédicte de Bourbon-Condé, duchesse du Maine (1676–1753), daughter of the Prince de Condé and a Bavarian Princess
- Anne Marie Louise, Duchess of Montpensier, duchesse de Montpensier (1627–1693), French princess by birth known as Mademosielle
- Anne Hamilton, 3rd Duchess of Hamilton, Anne Hamilton, 3rd Duchess of Hamilton (1631–1716) Scottish noblewoman
- Anne Innes-Ker, Duchess of Roxburghe (1854–1923), born Anne Emily Spencer-Churchill, daughter of the seventh Duke of Marlborough
- Anne Murray, Duchess of Atholl (1814–1897)
- Anne Scott, 1st Duchess of Buccleuch (1651–1732)
- Anne Sutherland-Leveson-Gower, Duchess of Sutherland (1829–1888)
- Henrietta Anne Stuart (1644–1670), Henrietta Anne, Duchess of Orléans
- Anne of Brittany (1477–1514), Duchess of Brittany

== See also ==
- Anne, Queen of Great Britain (1665–1714), who was Duchess of Cumberland by virtue of her husband, Prince George of Denmark, Duke of Cumberland, although she was known by the higher style of Princess before her accession
