= Elizabeth Thynne =

Elizabeth Thynne may refer to:

- Elizabeth Thynne, Marchioness of Bath (1735–1825), British courtier
- Elizabeth Thynne, Viscountess Weymouth (c. 1711–1729)
- Elizabeth Seymour, Duchess of Somerset (1667–1722), English heiress, styled Lady Elizabeth Thynne, 1681–1682
