= Ashley Park, Surrey =

Private neighborhood in Walton-on-Thames, Surrey, UK

Coordinates: 51.37671°N 0.42059°W

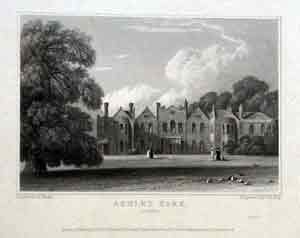
Ashley House, Ashley Park - image extracted from page 146 of volume 4 of "Views of the Seats of Noblemen and Gentlemen in England, Wales, Scotland and Ireland. L.P", drawn by John Preston Neale in 1818. Part of series of six volumes published from 1819 to 1823.

Ashley Park is a private residential neighbourhood at Walton-on-Thames in Surrey. Its central feature was a grandiose English country house, at times enjoying associated medieval manorial rights, which stood on the site, with alterations, between 1605 and the early 1920s. Its owners included Charles Sackville, 2nd Duke of Dorset, in the 18th century and members of the Sassoon family around the turn of the 20th century.

The bulk of the estate was developed into detached houses in the inter-war period, often rebuilt since in a modernist style with American influences; older examples tend to be in the Arts and Crafts style, its principal local exponent being Walter George Tarrant. Houses sold by its development company are more strictly subject to covenants mandating low density residential development.

== History ==
=== Former house and owners of the estate ===
The manor here was recorded in forms similar to and including Asshlees in 1433 in the hands of Joan widow of Robert Constable who held it of the Crown. This was a relatively small manor measured at 16.5 acres (0.067 km^{2}) as to its earliest demesne which was later extended. It is believed to have been mainly woodland with some lawns and fields. The manor was one of those incorporated into set of manors (the 'honour') of Hampton Court under the passing of the Hampton Court Manor Act 1539 or Manor of Hampton Court Act 1539 (31 Hen. 8. c. 5). The construction of the first properly documented "Ashley House" was by Lady Jane Berkeley in 1602–05 and it was altered over the centuries until demolition between 1920 and 1925. Whether a relief (livery of seisin) was not paid, no heirs existed or through attainder, Ashley Manor escheated to the Crown before and after Berkeley's ownership as was common of many manorial estates in that period. The manor and Walton Lee and Walton Meads were granted (that is to say, the chief tenancy of the same) by James I of England to Henry Gibb in 1625; but the house may already have been long-let to wealthy tenants – it was long leased by 1630 to the brother of the King's favourite (the Duke of Buckingham) Christopher Villiers, 1st Earl of Anglesey who lived at Ashley Park and died in Windsor in April 1630. It may have been he who extended the estate as he was before ennoblement successively Gentleman of the Horse; Gentleman of the Bedchamber; Master of the Robes and five years after being granted his earldom Chief Steward or Keeper of the Honour of Hampton Court in 1628 supplemented by that of Bushy Park the year after.

Lord Anglesey's widow, Elizabeth married in 1641 Hon. Benjamin Weston one of ten children of the financially astute Lord Treasurer to King James and King Charles, Richard Weston, 1st Earl of Portland; they continued to live there until she died in 1662. Multiple owners or tenants of short duration followed before it was bought by Field Marshal Viscount Shannon in 1718, who purchased from the estate of Sir Richard Pyne, retired Lord Chief Justice of Ireland (1695–1709); he bought the manorial rights which were until then held separately, and he died at the house, 20 December 1740. Lord Anglesey and Lord Shannon are buried and memorialised in the parish church of Walton-on-Thames. Lord Shannon's heir and only child Grace became by marriage The Countess of Middlesex (d.1763). By her Will and by virtue of her husband dying like her childless in 1769, the estate passed to her cousin Colonel John Stephenson and thereafter his sisters.

The house was inherited by a cousin of these sisters: Sir Henry Fletcher, Member of Parliament for Cumberland in 1786 and stayed in his family until it was bought by Sassoon David Sassoon shortly before his death in 1867; his grandson Sassoon Joseph Sassoon and young family were the final owners of the house.

As to the final form of the house it is recorded the second Fletcher heir, among the title back-named since the 4th generation Aubrey-Fletcher baronets, "pulled down a great deal of the house at Ashley Park".

== Other uses ==
=== Former Golf Club ===
Ashley Park Golf Club appeared in the 1890s but ceased to exist prior to the First World War. The house itself remained in the Sassoon family until it was demolished in 1920.

=== Subdivision into individual plots ===
Redevelopment occurred in three phases:

1. Early construction of Walton-on-Thames station in railway history – May 1838 – caused the owners to sell minor land for building for cottages nearest to the railway and along public roads.
2. An advent in commuting to the City of London led to clusters of planned houses at the north end of Ashley Road and at the Halfway by 1874 and a major reduction in eastern parkland.
3. Executors of the S. Joseph Sassoon estate in the 1920s needed to pay the Crown the newly increased form of death duties and provide for heirs. The increasingly costly House was demolished. The 18th century Dower House (with two renamed wings) on Oatlands Drive was not demolished, its large cottage-style terrace of three houses is listed, mainly for heritage. The rump of the estate was sold to a purposely incorporated development company which sold high-class building plots and houses subject to and benefitting from covenants of a high initial minimum price and prohibiting non-detached houses.

Roads in the final phase of sales were not offered to the local authority, limiting pavements. The scale of development has preserved many trees planted on parts which were once variously its golf course, owner's private parkland and scattered centuries-old, diverse woodland. The north-west extreme of the park became the tree-lined public green space which shares its name and in the late 20th century developed a home maintenance superstore and surface car parks. The architecture of houses is mainly inter-war Arts and Crafts style, its principal local exponent being Walter George Tarrant, who may have worked on grander examples.

Tenants and tenants-in-chief of Ashley Park

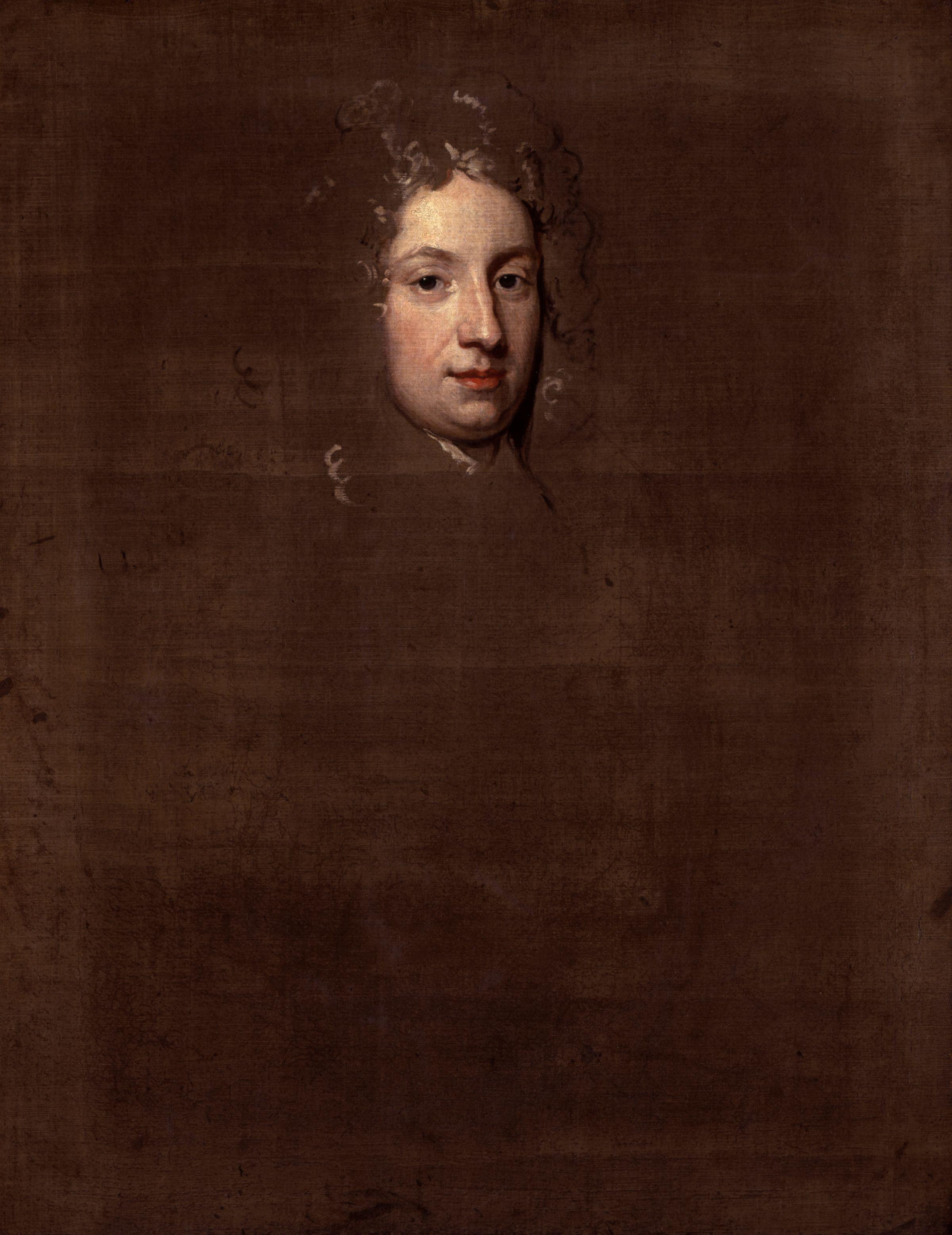
Field Marshal Richard Boyle, 2nd Viscount Shannon ^{PC}(1675–1740)

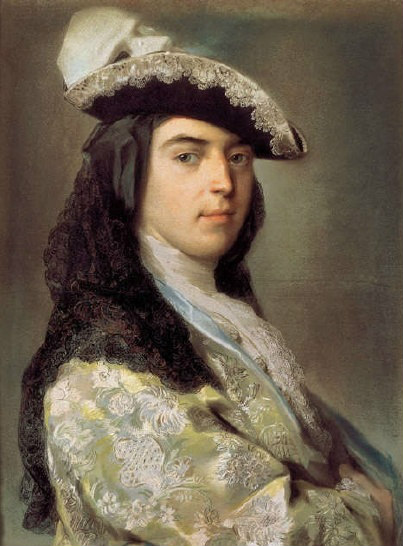
Charles Sackville, 2nd Duke of Dorset ^{PC} owned the house through his wife whilst holding courtesy style of Earl of Middlesex, and later occupied it having come into his father's title of Duke of Dorset
(from marriage, 1751, until his death, 1759)

== Sources ==
- Nichols, John (1866). The Herald and genealogist, vol. 3. Ulan Press.
