= Charles Sackville =

Charles Sackville may refer to:

- Charles Sackville, 6th Earl of Dorset (1643–1706), English poet and courtier
- Charles Sackville, 2nd Duke of Dorset (1711–1769), British politician, opera impresario and cricketer
