= Viscountess Weymouth =

Viscountess Weymouth is a title given to the wife of Viscount Weymouth (normally the son of the Marquess of Bath). The title has been held by a number of women, including:

- Elizabeth Thynne, Viscountess Weymouth (c.1711-1729)
- Louisa Thynne, Viscountess Weymouth (c.1712-1736)
- Elizabeth Thynne, Marchioness of Bath (1735-1825)
- Emma Thynn, Viscountess Weymouth (born 1986)
