= 1734 English cricket season =

Cricket season review

In the 1734 English cricket season, the active teams were four counties (Kent, Middlesex, Surrey, and Sussex); and two clubs (Croydon and London). Records have been found of the earliest known match at the Vine Cricket Ground in Sevenoaks (aka Sevenoaks Vine). Details of eight matches are known. (Note: Any match listed in the ACS' Important Match Guide (1981) is historically important, and therefore of the highest standard, whether or not a scorecard might exist. The same applies to numerous matches discovered by researchers since 1981. For further information, see First-class cricket..)

== London v Croydon ==
These teams had been rivals for some years past, but relations took a turn for the worse in 1734 after Croydon allegedly failed to arrive for a match which London said had definitely been arranged. The London people were especially aggrieved that Croydon did this after "having been regaled with a good dinner".

The teams had met twice in mid-season. Croydon won at Duppas Hill on or about 25 July, and London won a return match at the Artillery Ground on 1 August. Then, in September, London issued a challenge "to play with any eleven men in England, with this exception only, that they will not admit of one from Croydon". No surviving post-match report has been found, and so there is no evidence that the game took place. As London wished to play "any eleven men in England" (excluding players from Croydon), and not just any team in England, it appears that they welcomed all-comers, and that the players in the "any eleven" team, if it was formed, would have been drawn from a number of clubs and counties.

== London v Kent ==
London had two matches against Kent, the first on 12 June at Dartford Brent. A report said that London won "though there was 6 to 4 laid against London in the middle of the game". No scores are known. The return match was a week later, at the Artillery Ground on 19 June. This time, London won convincingly by an innings & 25 runs. Kent scored 31 and 51; London scored 107.

== London v Surrey ==
London played Surrey on 26 August at Kennington Common. The result is unknown. The match was pre-announced in the London Evening Post of Thursday, 22 August. It says: "the wickets to be pitched precisely (sic) between 12 and 1 o'clock"! No surviving post-match report has been found.

== Kent v Sussex ==
Kent and Sussex played each other on 6 and 11 September. The first match was on Sevenoaks Vine, its earliest known use as a venue. Lord Middlesex and his brother Lord John Sackville played for Kent; and Sir William Gage for Sussex. Kent won by an unknown margin. The game on 11 September was to be played in Lewes, perhaps at The Dripping Pan, but no post-match report has been found.

Sevenoaks Vine is one of the oldest cricket grounds in England. It was given to the town of Sevenoaks in 1773 by John Frederick Sackville, 3rd Duke of Dorset, the owner of Knole House, where the ground is located. The land was thought previously to have been used as a vineyard for the Archbishops of Canterbury (hence the name). The weatherboard pavilion is 19th-century. The Vine Cricket Club must pay Sevenoaks Town Council a rent of 2 peppercorns per year – one for the ground, and one for the pavilion. They, in turn, must pay Lord Sackville (if asked) one cricket ball on 21 July each year. Lord Middlesex became the 2nd Duke of Dorset in 1765. The famous 3rd Duke was his nephew, being the son of Lord John Sackville.

== Other events ==
Thu 13 June. The St James Evening Post reported a couple of serious injuries in a private match at the Artillery Ground: "...a stander-by (sic) had the misfortune to have his knee-pan put out by a blow from the ball, and another was much bruised in the face by a like accident".

A game between London and Sevenoaks, arranged for Monday, 8 July, on Kennington Common, was not played due to the non-appearance of the Sevenoaks team. The Whitehall Evening Post reported that, according to the Articles of Agreement, their deposit money was forfeit. Since the first known use of Articles of Agreement in the 1727 season at the Alan Brodrick's XI v 2nd Duke of Richmond's XI match, it had perhaps become common practice to draw up such an agreement before important matches, especially if large stakes were involved.

== First mentions ==
=== Clubs and teams ===
- England Eleven (excluding Croydon)

=== Players ===
- Charles Sackville, Lord Middlesex
- Lord John Philip Sackville

=== Venues ===
- Vine Cricket Ground, Sevenoaks, aka Sevenoaks Vine

== Bibliography ==
- ACS (1981). A Guide to Important Cricket Matches Played in the British Isles 1709–1863. Nottingham: ACS. OCLC 85045528.
- Ashley-Cooper, F. S. (1929). Kent Cricket Matches, 1719–1880. Canterbury: Gibbs & Sons. OCLC 220674085.
- Buckley, G. B. (1935). Fresh Light on 18th Century Cricket. Birmingham: Cotterell & Co. OCLC 23450280.
- Maun, Ian (2009). From Commons to Lord's, Volume One: 1700 to 1750. Cambridge: Roger Heavens. ISBN 978-19-00592-52-9.
- McCann, Tim (2004). Sussex Cricket in the Eighteenth Century (PDF). Vol. 88. Lewes: West Sussex Record Office. ISBN 978-08-54450-55-8.
- Waghorn, H. T. (1899). Cricket Scores, Notes, &c. From 1730–1773. Edinburgh: Blackwood. OCLC 1086375331.
