= Henry Temple, 1st Viscount Palmerston =

Irish nobleman and politician

Henry Temple, 1st Viscount Palmerston (c. 1673 – 10 June 1757), of East Sheen, Surrey and Broadlands, Hampshire, was an Anglo-Irish landowner and Whig politician who sat in the British House of Commons from 1727 to 1747.

== Early life ==
Temple was the eldest son of Sir John Temple, Speaker of the Irish House of Commons, and his wife Jane Yarner, daughter of Sir Abraham Yarner, muster-master general for Ireland. He was educated at Eton College from around 1689 to 1693 and was admitted at King's College, Cambridge in 1693. On 10 June 1703, he married Anne Houblon (1683 - 13 December 1735), the daughter of Abraham Houblon, a governor of the Bank of England.

== Political career ==
In 1715, Temple acceded to a place as joint chief remembrancer of the court of Exchequer for Ireland, for which he was granted the reversion as a child in 1680. He was created Viscount Palmerston of Palmerston, County Dublin, and Baron Temple of Mount Temple on 12 March 1723. He helped Bishop Berkeley in his schemes in the West Indies.

At the 1727 British general election, Temple was returned unopposed as Member of Parliament for East Grinstead. He voted with successive Administrations throughout his career. At the 1734 British general election, he transferred to Bossiney and was returned unopposed as MP. He transferred again at the 1741 British general election to Weobley and was returned as MP again unopposed. In 1740 he became the sole holder of his place as chief remembrancer of the court of the Irish Exchequer and held it for the rest of his life. He did not stand at the 1747 British general election.

== Domestic life ==
In 1736, Palmerston bought Broadlands from Humphrey Sydenham and began to rework the gardens there. He began the deformalisation of the gardens between the river and the house and produced the (broad-lands) "gentle descent to the river". On 11 May 1738 at St Antholin, Budge Row, he married again, to Isabella Fryer, widow of Sir John Fryer, 1st Baronet, and daughter of Sir Francis Gerard, 4th Baronet.

== Death and legacy ==
Palmerston died aged 84 on 10 June 1757. He had two children by his first wife, neither of whom survived him.:

- Henry Temple, Lord Temple of Mount Temple (died 18 August 1740) father of Henry Temple, 2nd Viscount Palmerston
- Richard Temple (MP) (c.1726 – 8 August 1749)

He had no children by his second wife Isabella, who died on 11 August 1762 at North End, Hammersmith. He was succeeded by his grandson Henry.

== Arms ==
Coat of arms of Henry Temple, 1st Viscount Palmerston
| Crest A talbot sejant sable, collared and lined or. Escutcheon Quarterly 1st & 4th, Or, an eagle displayed sable (for Leofric, Earl of Mercia); 2nd & 3rd Argent, two bars sable, each charged with three martlets or (Temple). Supporters Dexter, a lion regardant pean; Sinister, a horse regardant argent, maned, tailed and hoofed or. Motto Flecti non frangi (To be bent, not broken). |

Parliament of Great Britain
| Preceded by The Viscount Shannon; Edward Conyers | Member of Parliament for East Grinstead; 1727–1734; With: The Viscount Shannon | Succeeded by Earl of Middlesex; Edward Conyers |
| Preceded by John Hedges; James Cholmondeley | Member of Parliament for Bossiney; 1734–1741; With: Townshend Andrews 1734–1737; Peregrine Poulett 1737–1741 | Succeeded by Richard Liddell; Thomas Foster |
| Preceded by Sir John Buckworth, Bt; James Cornewall | Member of Parliament for Weobley; 1741–1747; With: The Lord Carpenter | Succeeded by Mansell Powell; Savage Mostyn |
Peerage of Ireland
| New title | Viscount Palmerston; 1723–1757 | Succeeded by Henry Temple |
