= Reuben T. W. Sayers =

British painter (1815–1888)

Reuben Thomas William Sayers (1815–1888) was a British painter, best known for his portraits of the members of the British aristocracy, most notably Harriet Sutherland-Leveson-Gower, Duchess of Sutherland and William Edwardes, 3rd Baron Kensington. He exhibited at the Royal Academy from 1841 to 1867, and his works are part of the collections of the National Portrait Gallery, the Salford Museum and Art Gallery, and the Manchester Art Gallery.
