= Harriet Sutherland-Leveson-Gower, Duchess of Sutherland =

British duchess, abolitionist and Mistress of the Robes

Her Grace The Duchess of Sutherland
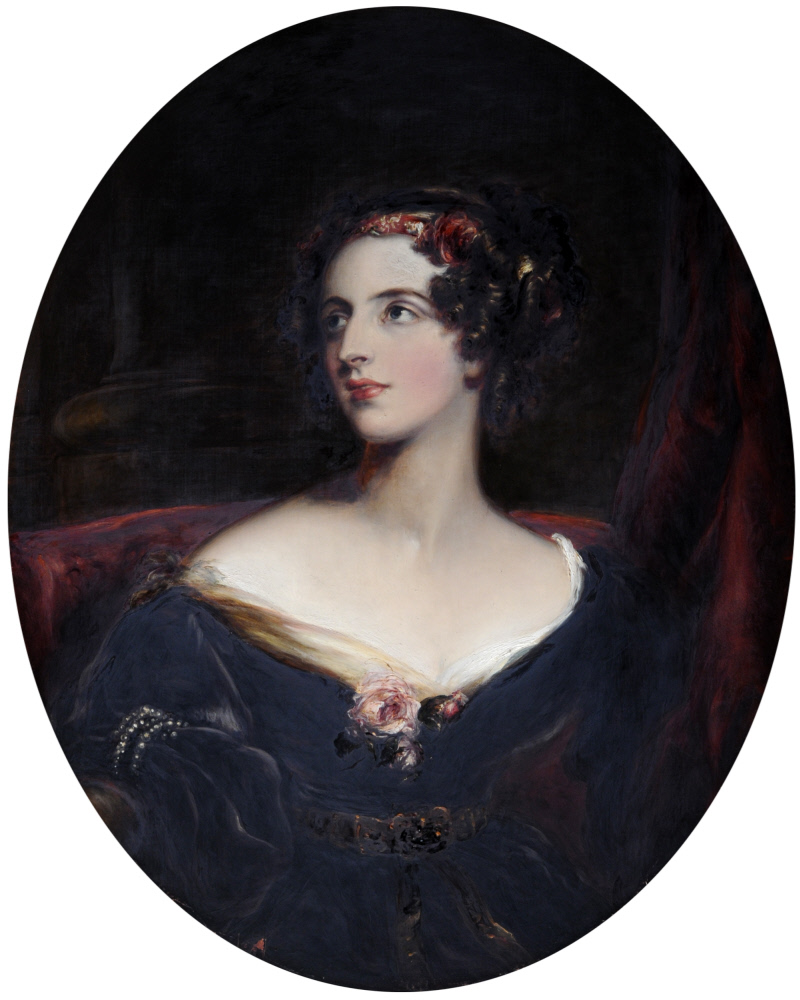
- The Duchess of Sutherland by Reuben Thomas William Sayers

Mistress of the Robes
- In office 1859–1861
- Monarch: Victoria
- Prime Minister: The Lord Palmerston
- Preceded by: The Duchess of Manchester
- Succeeded by: The Duchess of Wellington
- In office 1853–1858
- Monarch: Victoria
- Prime Minister: The Earl of Aberdeen; The Lord Palmerston
- Preceded by: The Duchess of Atholl
- Succeeded by: The Duchess of Manchester
- In office 1846–1852
- Monarch: Victoria
- Prime Minister: Lord John Russell
- Preceded by: The Duchess of Buccleuch
- Succeeded by: The Duchess of Atholl
- In office 1837–1841
- Monarch: Victoria
- Prime Minister: The Viscount Melbourne
- Preceded by: The Duchess of Leeds
- Succeeded by: The Duchess of Buccleuch

Personal details
- Born: The Hon. Harriet Elizabeth Georgiana Howard; 21 May 1806 Westminster, London, England
- Died: 27 October 1868 (aged 62) St James's, London, England
- Resting place: Trentham, Staffordshire, England
- Spouse: George Sutherland-Leveson-Gower, 2nd Duke of Sutherland (m. 1823; died 1861)
- Children: Elizabeth Campbell, Duchess of Argyll; Evelyn Stuart, Lady Blantyre; Caroline FitzGerald, Duchess of Leinster; George Sutherland-Leveson-Gower, 3rd Duke of Sutherland; Lady Blanche Sutherland-Leveson-Gower; Lord Frederick Sutherland-Leveson-Gower; Lord William Nicholson; Lord Joseph Iles; Constance Grosvenor, Duchess of Westminster; Lady Victoria Sutherland-Leveson-Gower; Lord Albert Sutherland-Leveson-Gower; Lord Ronald Sutherland-Leveson-Gower; Lady Alexandrina Sutherland-Leveson-Gower
- Parents: George Howard, 6th Earl of Carlisle; Lady Georgiana Cavendish
- Occupation: Mistress of the Robes to Queen Victoria

Harriet Elizabeth Georgiana Sutherland-Leveson-Gower, (Note: The surname Leveson-Gower is pronounced Lewson-Gore.) Duchess of Sutherland (née Howard; 21 May 1806 – 27 October 1868), styled The Honourable Harriet Howard before her marriage, was an English courtier and abolitionist from the Howard family.

She was Mistress of the Robes under several Whig administrations: 1837–1841, 1846–1852, 1853–1858, and 1859–1861; and a great friend of Queen Victoria. She was an important figure in London's high society, and used her social position to undertake various philanthropic undertakings including the protest of the English ladies against American slavery.

== Family and early life ==
Harriet was the third daughter of George Howard, 6th Earl of Carlisle and his wife Lady Georgiana Cavendish, who was a daughter of Georgiana, Duchess of Devonshire.

== Marriage ==
On 18 May 1823, she married her cousin George Sutherland-Leveson-Gower, Earl Gower (1786–1861), who had been elected MP for St Mawes, Cornwall (a rotten borough) in 1808, and succeeded his father as second Duke of Sutherland in 1833. Gower was twenty years older than she, but their union proved one of affection and produced four sons and seven daughters.

The Duchess of Sutherland held a social position of high influence, aided by her friendship to Queen Victoria as well as her family's great wealth. By the Duchess's influence Stafford House next to St. James's Palace, became an important centre of society, and the starting-point of various philanthropic undertakings. The Duchess helped organise the "Stafford House Address" petition against slavery, and former American First Lady Julia Tyler wrote a defence of slavery titled "The Women of England vs. the Women of America", in response to it. In response to "The Women of England vs. the Women of America", former slave Harriet Jacobs wrote a letter to the New York Tribune which was her first published writing; it was published in 1853 and signed "Fugitive".

The Duchess's stance on slavery was heavily criticised by Karl Marx because her mother-in-law, the previous Duchess, had been closely associated with the clearance of the inhabitants of Sutherland thirty years earlier, so that she could reuse 794,000 acres (3200 km^{2}) of land for commercial sheep farming.

== Mistress of the Robes ==
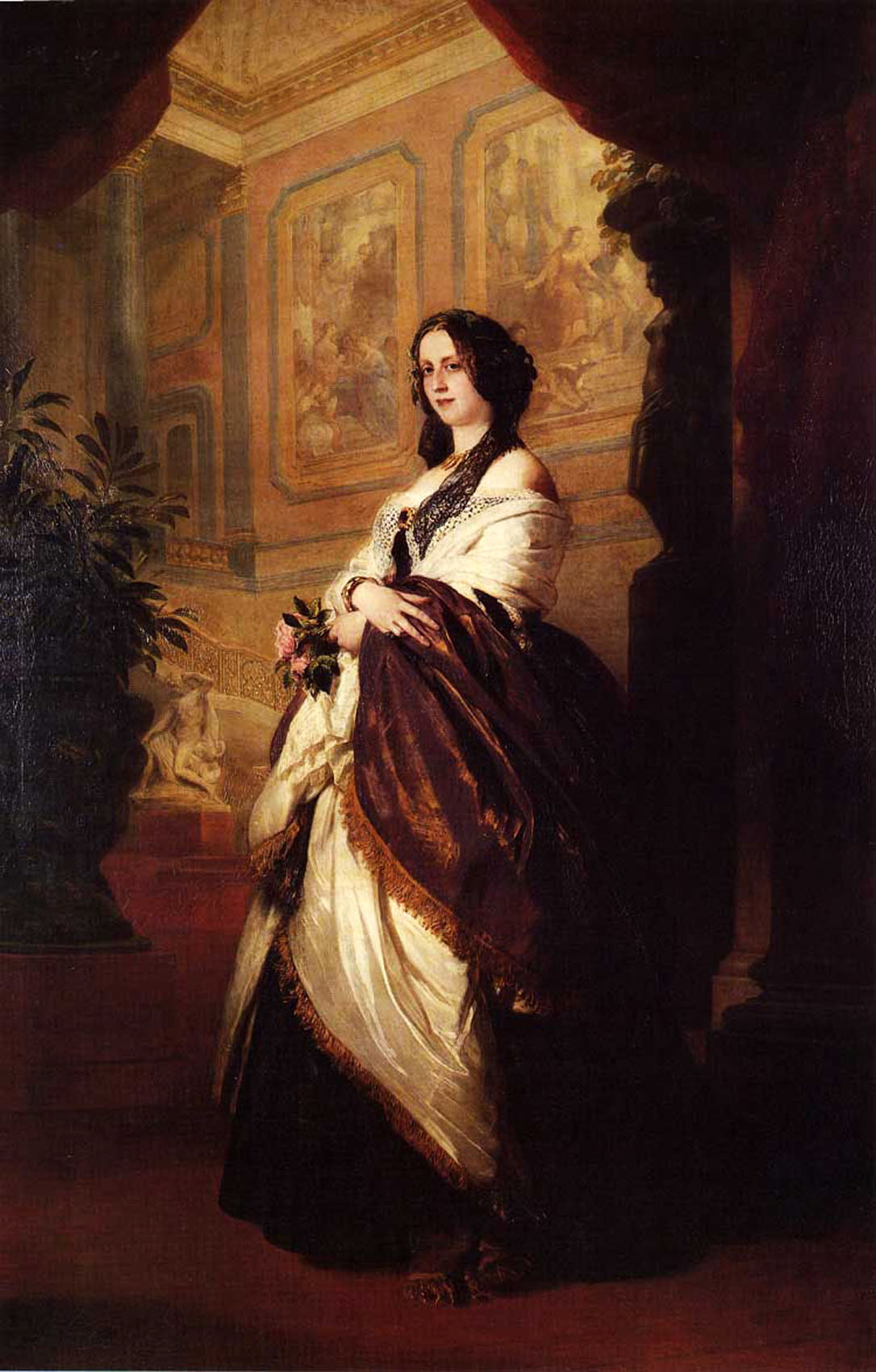
Harriet Sutherland-Leveson-Gower, Duchess of Sutherland by Franz Xaver Winterhalter, 1849. The background is the interior of Stafford House

On the accession of Queen Victoria the Duchess was appointed Mistress of the Robes, (Note: The Duchess served several times as Mistress of the Robes to her friend Queen Victoria, a post which was later held by her eldest daughter Elizabeth Georgiana (Duchess of Argyll) and her daughter-in-law Anne (Duchess of Sutherland).) and held that post whenever the Whigs were in office until her husband's death (August 1837 to September 1841, July 1846 to March 1852, January 1853 to February 1858, June 1859 to April 1861). In that role, she presided at the coronation of Queen Victoria in 1838.

From the Queen's refusal to part with the Duchess and her other ladies arose the Bedchamber Crisis of 1839, which resulted in the Whigs returning to office. Victoria gave a sympathetic description of the Duchess's character, and after the death of her husband, Prince Albert, she spent the first weeks of her widowhood with the Duchess as her only companion.

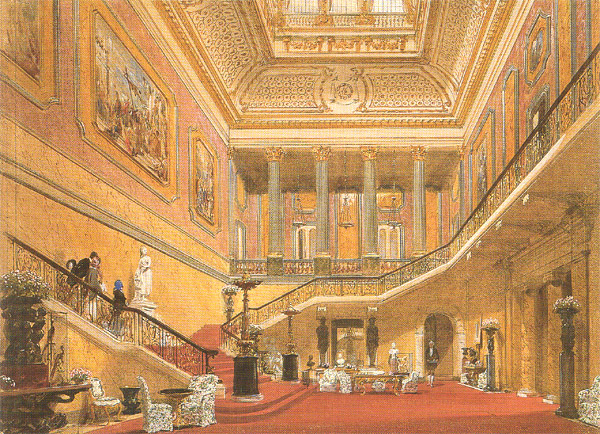
Stafford House (now renamed Lancaster House) central hall and principal staircase by Joseph Nash 1850

Queen Victoria is said to have remarked to the Duchess on arriving at Stafford House, "I have come from my House to your Palace." With its ornate decoration and the sweep of its main staircase, the Grand Hall was considered one of the finest town houses in London.

In 1861 the 4th Rogart Company of the 1st Sutherland Volunteer Rifle Corps formed up. The company bore the title "Duchess Harriet's Company Rogart" upon the pouch-belt plate.

The Duchess's last public appearance was at the Prince of Wales's marriage in 1863. In that year she was seized with an illness from which she never recovered. However, she was able to entertain Garibaldi, for whom she had great admiration, at Chiswick House and Trentham, Staffordshire, during his visit to England in April 1864. She died on 27 October 1868 at her London residence, Stafford House, aged 62. She was interred in the mausoleum of the Dukes of Sutherland at Trentham. W E Gladstone was one of the pall-bearers at her funeral. The Duchess's letters, some of which were published by her son Lord Ronald Gower in Stafford House Letters, parts iv-vi., prove her to have had an affectionate disposition, with some sense of humour. She had also an interest in architecture and gardening.

== Issue ==
On 18 May 1823, Harriet married George Sutherland-Leveson-Gower, Earl Gower, eldest son of the 2nd Marquess of Stafford, and a man twenty years her senior. Her father-in-law was created Duke of Sutherland in 1833, and was succeeded by his son later that year, whereupon Harriet became the Duchess of Sutherland.

They had thirteen children:

- Lady Elizabeth Georgiana (30 May 1824 – 25 May 1878), married George Douglas Campbell, 8th Duke of Argyll and had issue.
- Lady Evelyn (8 August 1825 – 1869), married Charles Stuart, 12th Lord Blantyre
- Lady Caroline Leveson-Gower (15 April 1827 – 1887), married Charles FitzGerald, 4th Duke of Leinster and had issue.
- Lord George Granville William (19 December 1828 – 22 September 1892), succeeded as 3rd Duke.
- Lady Blanche Julia Sutherland-Leveson-Gower (26 June 1830 – 24 February 1832)
- Lord Frederick George (11 November 1832 – 6 October 1854)
- Lord William Nicholson (11 September 1833 - 14 March 1845)
- Lord Joseph Iles (11 September 1833 - 15 April 1840)
- Lady Constance Gertrude (16 June 1834 – 19 December 1880), married Hugh Grosvenor, 1st Duke of Westminster and had issue.
- Lady Victoria Sutherland-Leveson-Gower (16 May 1838 – 19 June 1839)
- Lord Albert (21 Nov 1843 – 1874), married Grace Abdy, daughter of Sir Thomas Neville Abdy, 1st Baronet and had issue, including Frederick Neville Sutherland Leveson-Gower.
- Lord Ronald Charles Sutherland-Leveson-Gower (2 August 1845 – 9 March 1916), died unmarried.
- Lady Alexandrina Sutherland-Leveson-Gower (3 February 1848 – 21 June 1849)

In 1871, while her son-in-law, the Duke of Argyll, was serving in the Cabinet, his son (Harriet's grandson), Lord Lorne, married one of Victoria's daughters, Princess Louise. Harriet's eldest son became 3rd Duke of Sutherland in 1861.

== In media ==
Harriet was portrayed by Rachael Stirling in the 2009 film The Young Victoria. She was portrayed by Margaret Clunie in the 2016 ITV series Victoria, though she is inaccurately depicted as carrying on an improbable romance with Prince Ernest of Saxe-Coburg and Gotha (later Duke of Saxe-Coburg and Gotha), in the couple of years before his marriage.

== Ancestry ==
Ancestors of Harriet Sutherland-Leveson-Gower, Duchess of Sutherland

8. Henry Howard, 4th Earl of Carlisle
4. Frederick Howard, 5th Earl of Carlisle
9. The Hon. Isabella Byron
2. George Howard, 6th Earl of Carlisle
10. Granville Leveson-Gower, 1st Marquess of Stafford
5. Lady Margaret Caroline Leveson-Gower
11. Lady Louisa Egerton
1. Harriet Sutherland-Leveson-Gower, Duchess of Sutherland
12. William Cavendish, 4th Duke of Devonshire
6. William Cavendish, 5th Duke of Devonshire
13. Charlotte Boyle, 6th Baroness Clifford
3. Lady Georgiana Dorothy Cavendish
14. John Spencer, 1st Earl Spencer
7. Lady Georgiana Spencer
15. Margaret Georgiana Poyntz

== Notes ==
Court offices
Preceded by Catherine Osborne, Duchess of Leeds	Mistress of the Robes to Queen Victoria; 1837–1841	Succeeded by The Duchess of Buccleuch and Queensberry
Preceded by The Duchess of Buccleuch and Queensberry	Mistress of the Robes to the Queen; 1846–1852	Succeeded by The Duchess of Atholl
Preceded by The Duchess of Atholl	Mistress of the Robes to the Queen; 1853–1858	Succeeded by The Duchess of Manchester
Preceded by The Duchess of Manchester	Mistress of the Robes to the Queen; 1859–1861	Succeeded by The Duchess of Wellington
