= Edward Conyers =

English barrister and Tory politician

Edward Conyers (baptised 14 February 1693 – 23 April 1742) was an English barrister and Tory politician who sat in the House of Commons between 1725 and 1741.

== Early life ==
Conyers was the second son of John Conyers, MP of Walthamstow, Essex, and his wife Mary Lee, daughter and heiress of George Lee of Stoke St. Milborough, Shropshire. Conyers had 15 siblings. His uncle was Sir Gerard Conyers, Lord Mayor of London. He matriculated at Corpus Christi College, Oxford on 22 July 1710. In 1787, he was admitted at the Middle Temple. He married the Hon. Matilda Fermor, daughter of William Fermor, 1st Baron Leominster before 1717.

== Career ==
After his father's death, Conyers was returned in his place as Member of Parliament for East Grinstead at a by-election on 6 April 1725. He did not stand at the 1727 British general election, but was returned unopposed at the 1734 British general election. He was one of Members who voted against the Westminster Bridge bill in 1736, and voted with the Opposition on the place bill in 1740. He did not stand in 1741.

== Later life and legacy ==
Conyers purchased the Copt Hall estate in 1739. He died on 23 April 1742 leaving six children, including a son and three daughters. His son John Conyers, was also an MP, and built the current Georgian mansion at Copt Hall, beginning in 1748.

Parliament of Great Britain
Preceded by John Conyers	Member of Parliament for East Grinstead; 1725–1727; With: Viscount Shannon	Succeeded by Viscount Palmerston; Viscount Shannon
Preceded by Viscount Palmerston; Viscount Shannon	Member of Parliament for East Grinstead; 1734–1741; With: Viscount Shannon	Succeeded by Sir Whistler Webster; Viscount Shannon
