= Mistress of the Robes =

Senior lady in the Royal Household of the United Kingdom (1553–2021)

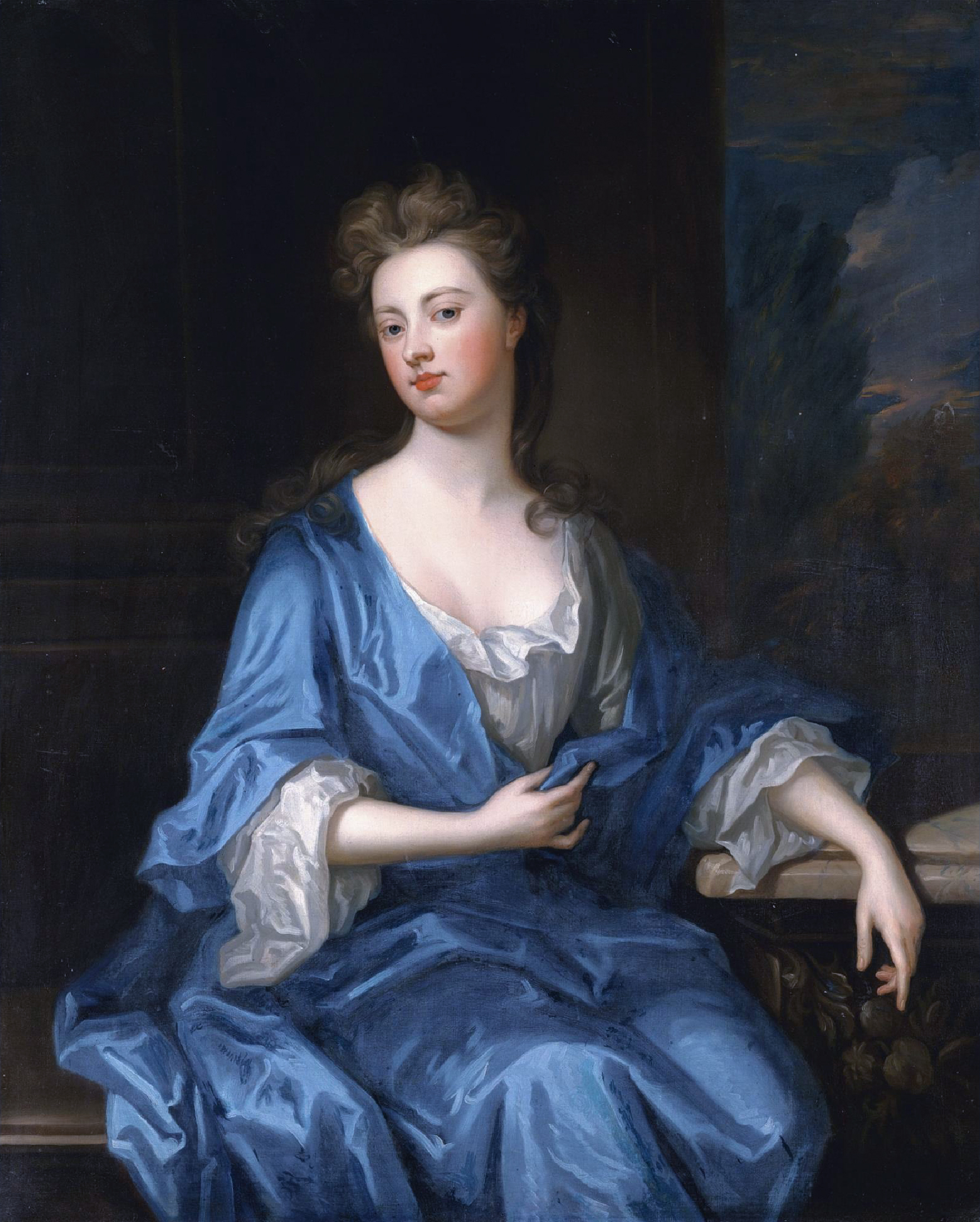
Sarah, Duchess of Marlborough, mistress of the robes to Queen Anne

The mistress of the robes was the senior lady in the Royal Household of the United Kingdom, who would, by appointment, attend on the queen (whether queen regnant or a queen consort). Queens dowager retained their own mistresses of the robes. In the 18th century, the princesses of Wales had one, too.

Initially responsible for the queen's clothes and jewellery as the name implies, the post-holder latterly had the responsibility for arranging the rota of attendance of the ladies-in-waiting on the queen, attending herself on more formal occasions, and undertaking duties at state ceremonies. During the 17th and 18th centuries, this role often overlapped with or was replaced as first lady of the bedchamber. In modern times, the mistress of the robes was almost always a duchess.

In the past, whenever the queen was a queen regnant, the mistress of the robes was a political appointment, changing with the government. This has not been the case since the death of Queen Victoria in 1901. Queen Elizabeth II had only two mistresses of the robes over her seventy year reign.

Since the accession of King Charles III no mistress of the robes has been appointed. In November 2022, it was announced that Queen Camilla would end the tradition of having ladies-in-waiting. Instead, she will be helped by "Queen's companions"; their role will be informal and they will not be involved in replying to letters or developing schedules.

== List of mistresses of the robes by queen or princess of Wales ==
=== Mary I, 1553–1558 ===
- 1553–1558: Susan Clarencieux

=== Elizabeth I, 1558–1603 ===
- 1559/1562–1603: Dorothy, Lady Stafford

=== Anne of Denmark, 1603–1619 ===
- 1603–1619: Audrey Walsingham

=== Henrietta Maria of France, 1625–1669 ===
- 1626–1652: Susan Feilding, Countess of Denbigh (also called First Lady of the Bedchamber)
- 1653–1669: Elizabeth Fielding Boyle, Countess of Guilford

=== Catherine of Braganza, 1662–1692 ===
- 1660–1692: Position vacant, replaced by a First Lady of the Bedchamber

=== Mary of Modena, 1673–1688 ===
- 1673–1688: Position vacant, replaced by a First Lady of the Bedchamber

=== Mary II, 1688–1694 ===
- 1688–1694: Lady Elizabeth Butler, Countess of Derby

=== Anne, 1704–1714 ===
- 1704–1711: Sarah Churchill, Duchess of Marlborough
- 1711–1714: Elizabeth Seymour, Duchess of Somerset

=== Caroline of Ansbach, 1714–1737 ===
- 1714–1717: Diana Beauclerk, Duchess of St Albans
- 1717–1723: Possibly vacant
- 1723–1731: Elizabeth Sackville, Duchess of Dorset
- 1731–1735: Henrietta Howard, Countess of Suffolk (Dowager Countess of Suffolk from 1733)
- 1735–1737: Position vacant

=== Augusta of Saxe-Gotha, 1736–1763 ===
- 1736–1745: Lady Archibald Hamilton
- 1745–1747: Position vacant
- 1747–1763: Grace Sackville, Countess of Middlesex

=== Charlotte of Mecklenburg-Strelitz, 1761–1818 ===
- 1761–1793: Mary Bertie, Duchess of Ancaster and Kesteven (Dowager Duchess of Ancaster and Kesteven from 1778)
- 1793–1818: Elizabeth Thynne, Marchioness of Bath (Dowager Marchioness of Bath from 1796)

=== Caroline of Brunswick, 1795–1821 ===
- 1795–1808: Anne Townshend, Marchioness Townshend
- 1808–1817: Catherine Douglas, Baroness Glenbervie
- 1817–1821: Possibly vacant

=== Adelaide of Saxe-Meiningen, 1830–1837 ===
- 1830–1830: Elizabeth Gordon, Duchess of Gordon
- 1830–1837: Catherine Osborne, Duchess of Leeds

=== Victoria, 1837–1901 ===
- 1837–1841: Harriet Sutherland-Leveson-Gower, Duchess of Sutherland
- 1841–1846: Charlotte Montagu Douglas Scott, Duchess of Buccleuch and Queensberry
- 1846–1852: Harriet Sutherland-Leveson-Gower, Duchess of Sutherland
- 1852–1853: Anne Murray, Duchess of Atholl
- 1853–1858: Harriet Sutherland-Leveson-Gower, Duchess of Sutherland
- 1858–1859: Louisa Montagu, Duchess of Manchester
- 1859–1861: Harriet Sutherland-Leveson-Gower, Duchess of Sutherland
- 1861–1868: Elizabeth Wellesley, Duchess of Wellington
- 1868–1870: Elizabeth Campbell, Duchess of Argyll
- 1870–1874: Anne Sutherland-Leveson-Gower, Duchess of Sutherland
- 1874–1880: Elizabeth Wellesley, Duchess of Wellington
- 1880–1883: Elizabeth Russell, Duchess of Bedford
- 1883–1885: Anne Innes-Ker, Duchess of Roxburghe
- 1885–1886: Louisa Montagu Douglas Scott, Duchess of Buccleuch and Queensberry
- 1886: Position vacant
  - Acting mistress of the robes: Elizabeth Russell, Duchess of Bedford
- 1886–1892: Louisa Montagu Douglas Scott, Duchess of Buccleuch and Queensberry
- 1892–1895: Position vacant
  - Acting mistress of the robes: Anne Innes-Ker, Duchess of Roxburghe, and Anne Murray, Dowager Duchess of Atholl (jointly)
- 1894: Position vacant
  - Acting mistress of the robes: Louisa McDonnell, Countess of Antrim
- 1895–1901: Louisa Montagu Douglas Scott, Duchess of Buccleuch and Queensberry

=== Alexandra of Denmark, 1901–1925 ===
- 1901–1912: Louisa Montagu Douglas Scott, Duchess of Buccleuch and Queensberry
- 1913–1925: Winifred Cavendish-Bentinck, Duchess of Portland

=== Mary of Teck, 1910–1953 ===
- 1910–1916: Evelyn Cavendish, Duchess of Devonshire
- 1916–1921: Eileen Sutherland-Leveson-Gower, Duchess of Sutherland
- 1921–1953: Evelyn Cavendish, Duchess of Devonshire (Dowager Duchess of Devonshire from 1938)

=== Elizabeth Bowes-Lyon, 1937–2002 ===
- 1937–1964: Helen Percy, Duchess of Northumberland (Dowager Duchess of Northumberland from 1946)
- 1964–1990: Kathleen Hamilton, Duchess of Abercorn (Dowager Duchess of Abercorn from 1979)
- 1990–2002: Position vacant

=== Elizabeth II, 1953–2022 ===
- 1953–1967: Mary Cavendish, Dowager Duchess of Devonshire
- 1967–2021: Fortune FitzRoy, Duchess of Grafton (Countess of Euston until 1970, Dowager Duchess of Grafton from 2011)
- 2021–2022: Position vacant

== See also ==
- Chief Court Mistress, Dutch, German, Scandinavian and Russian equivalent
- Camarera mayor de Palacio, Spanish equivalent
- Première dame d'honneur, French equivalent
- Surintendante de la Maison de la Reine, French equivalent
