= Walton Court, Walton-on-Thames =

Demolished building in Surrey, England

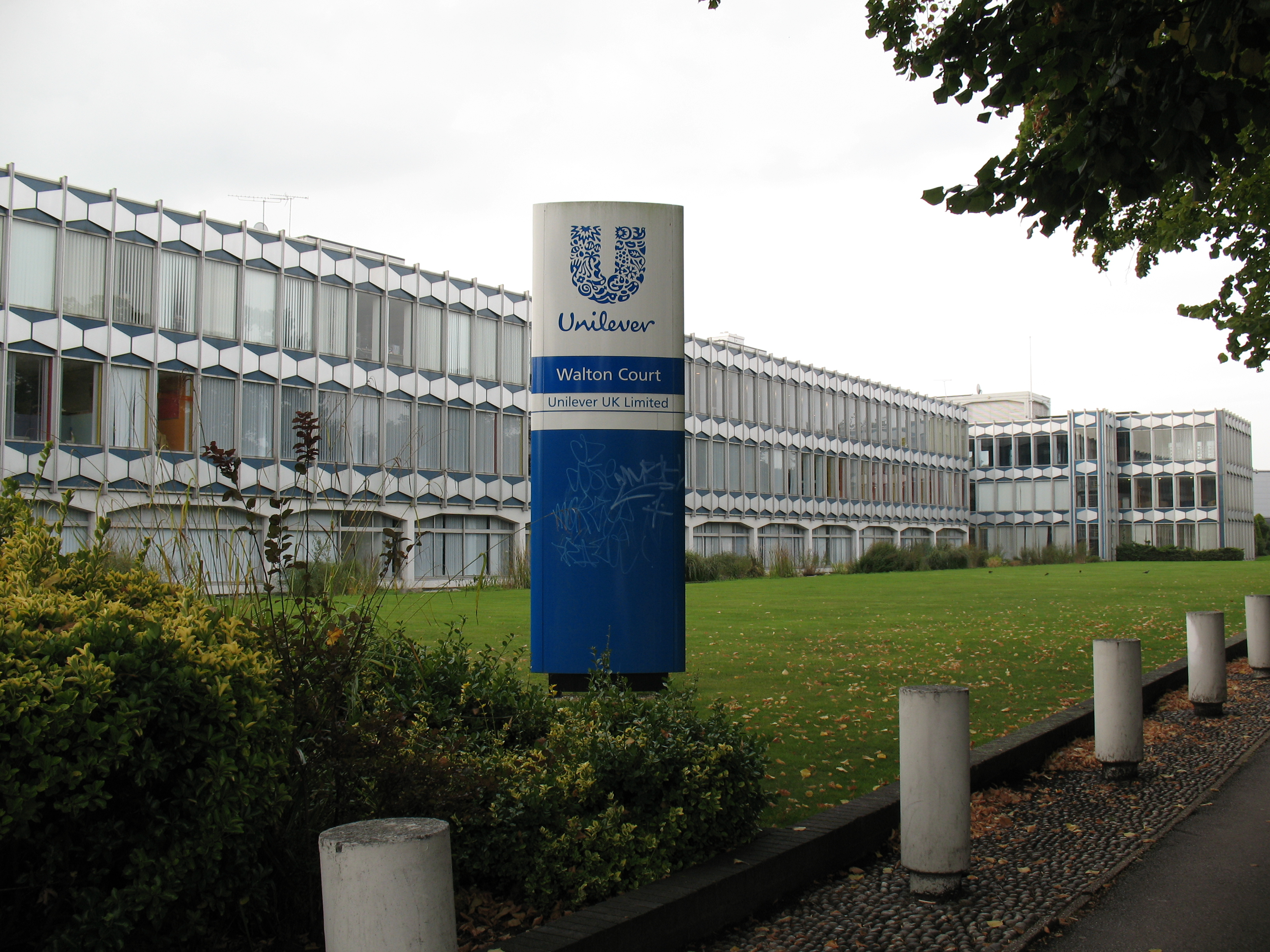
The building occupied by Unilever in 2008

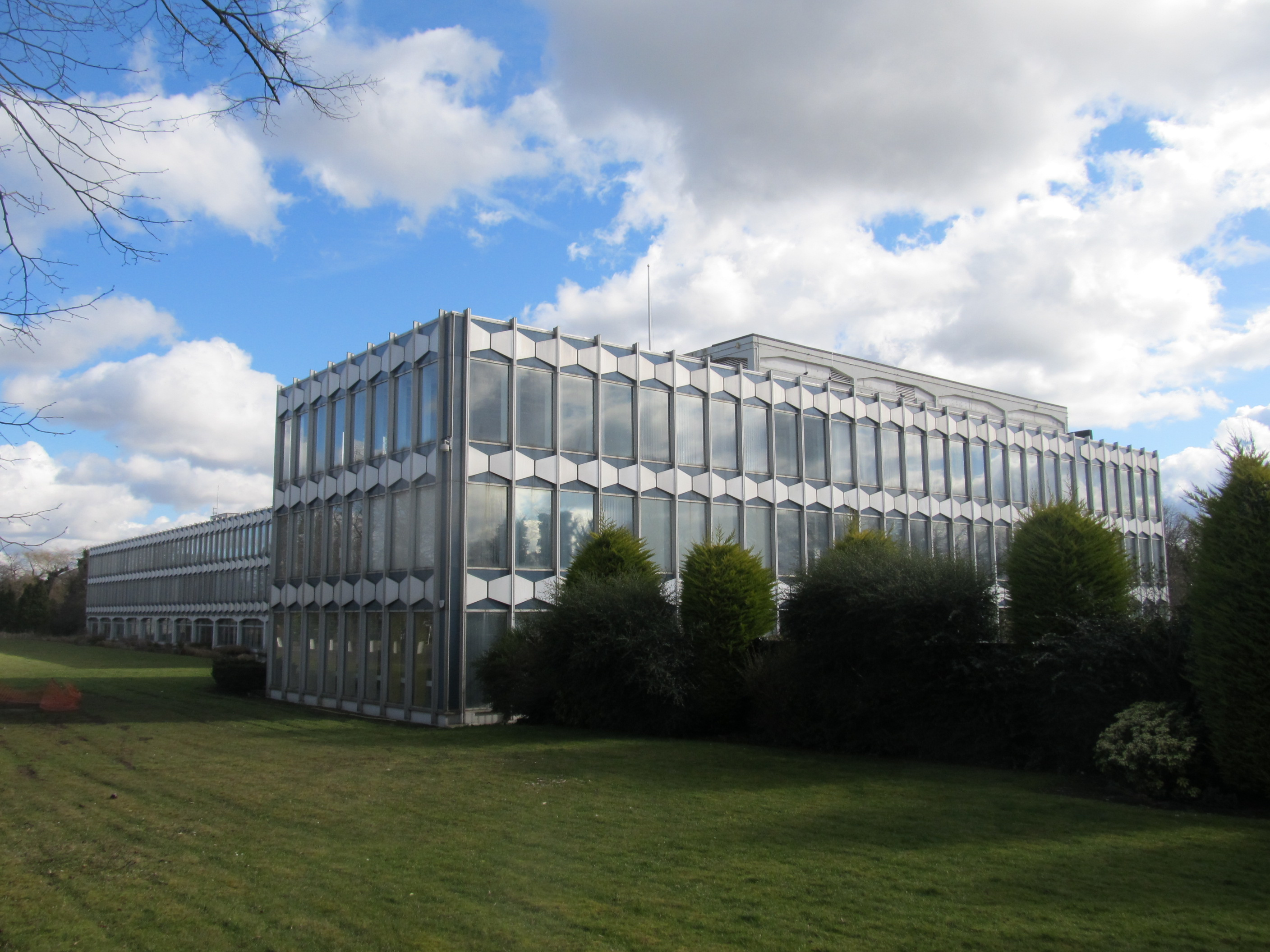
The 1968-69 extension in 2015

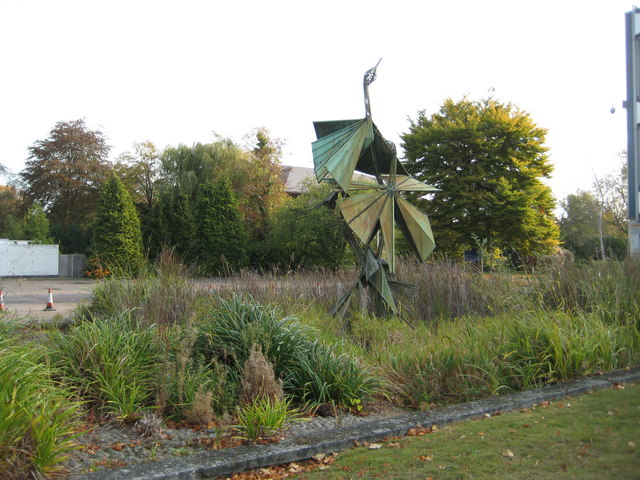
Bird sculpture in 2011

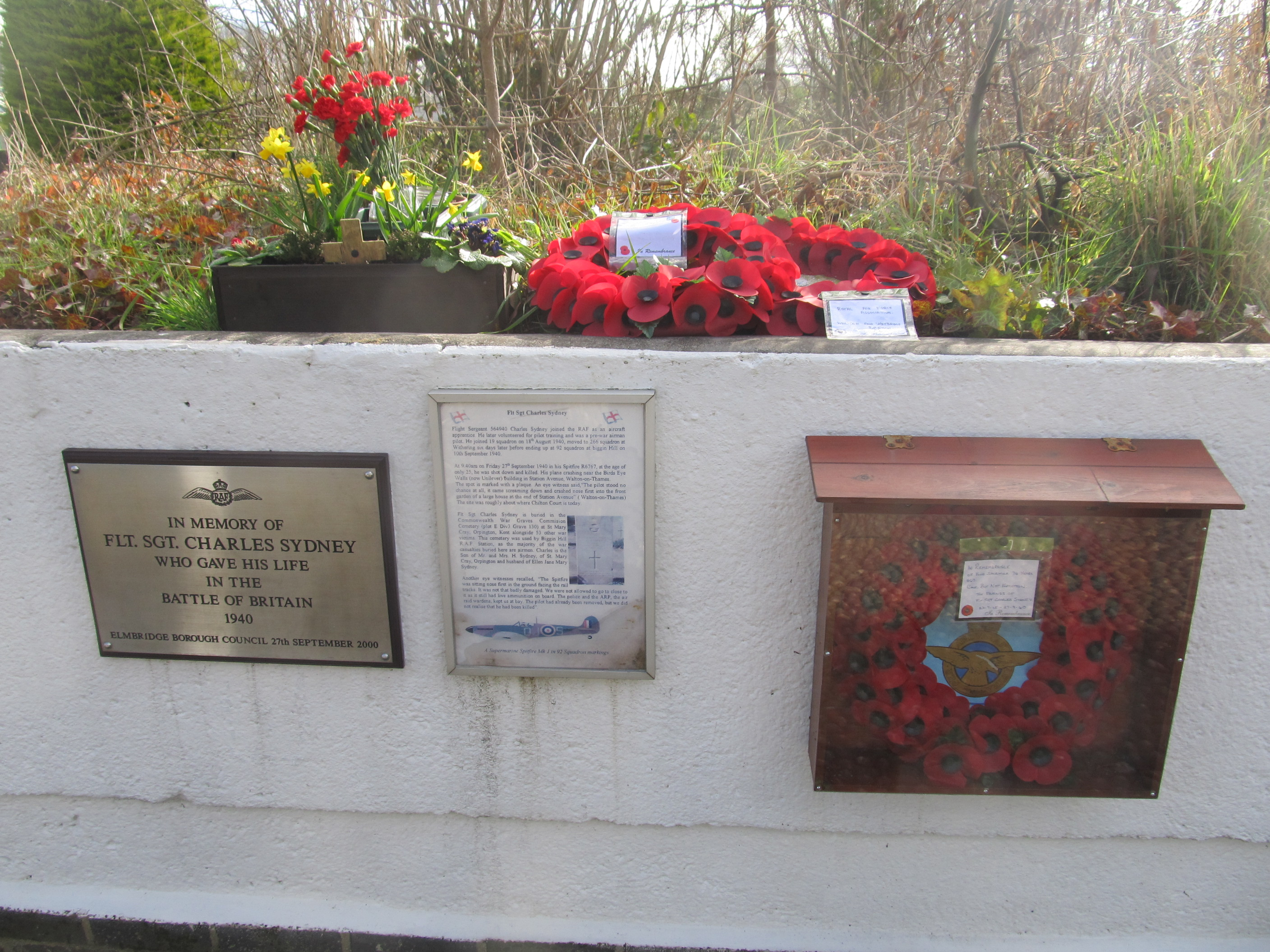
Memorial to Flight Sergeant Charles Sydney in 2015

Walton Court was an office building on Station Avenue in Walton-on-Thames, in the Borough of Elmbridge, Surrey. It was constructed in 1961–62 to serve as the UK corporate headquarters of Birds Eye. It became a Grade II listed building in November 1995, but was demolished from 2019 to be replaced by a residential development.

The building was designed by the architects Sir John Burnet, Tait and Partners, and constructed in 1961–62, with an extension added in 1967-68 as an alternative to a fourth storey provided for in the original design, but which was denied planning permission. The civil engineer was Bylander, Waddell and Partners, and the landscaping was done by Philip Hicks.

The main building was a long three-storey rectangular structure with a flat roof, about 318 ft × 170 ft (97 m × 52 m), around two internal courtyards, set back from Station Avenue to the north behind with a reflective pool and lawns. The 1967-68 extension was added across the west end, joined by a glazed link, to create a T layout. It was constructed with a precast concrete and pre-stressed concrete frame, supporting high alumina cement beams with concrete slab floors, spanning large internal spaces without internal columns.

The exterior curtain wall had full-height plate glass panes separated by aluminum mullions, with repeating details of half-hexagonal anodised aluminium panels over dark blue vitreous enamelled spandrel panels above each floor. The building's geometric design and silver-blue colour palette echoed the company's product range. The repeating op-art patterns of the main facade were reflected in the pool that ran beside Station Avenue. Standing in an arm of the reflection pool near the entrance was a large semi-abstract bronze sculpture of three rising birds by John McCarthy: this was separately listed at Grade II in 1995.

The interior was faced with marble and timber panels. The eastern courtyard had concrete monolithic sculptures by Alan Collins beside a sunken pool with a fountain. In early years, the courtyards housed a small menagerie with alligators, flamingos, and penguins, later removed to London Zoo.

It was listed at Grade II in November 1995, for the quality of its 1960s design with integrated courtyards and reflecting pool, sculptures and water features; its precise details and high-quality finishes; and its historical interest as the headquarters of one of the first companies to move its offices from central London to an integrated suburban site. The location lies close to Walton-on-Thames railway station, with easy access to motorways, and Heathrow Airport to the north.

Part of the site was dedicated in 2000 as a war memorial for the Second World War RAF fighter pilot Flight Sergeant Charles Sydney, whose Spitfire was shot down at the west end of Station Avenue on 27 September 1940.

The building was left empty after Birds Eye's parent Unilever moved out in 2008 to merge offices from Walton, Kingston and Crawley to a new site in Leatherhead. It was bought by Crest Nicholson for a residential development. Despite objections from the Twentieth Century Society and many local residents, planning permission and listed building consent was granted to demolish all of the listed buildings on grounds of public benefit and replace them with nine residential blocks containing 375 apartments. Demolition commenced in 2019, to allow construction of the new residential development, Walton Court Gardens. While the building was empty, the sculpture by John McCarthy was stolen. There are plans for the new development to include a replacement sculpture, and the Collins monoliths and war memorial will be reinstated.

CCTV images from the building assisted in the enquiry into the murder of Milly Dowler.
