= Charles Sackville, 2nd Duke of Dorset =

British politician

His Grace The Duke of Dorset PC
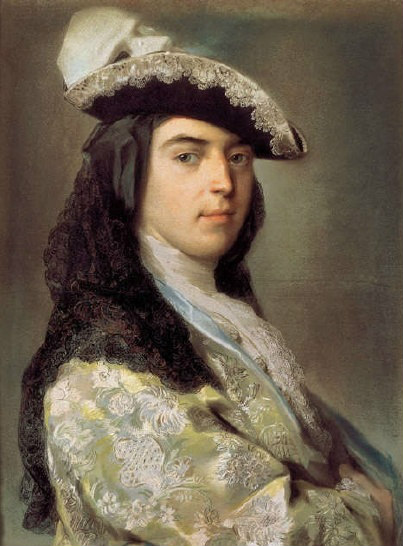
- Born: 6 February 1711; England
- Died: 5 January 1769 (aged 57); London, England
- Parent(s): Lionel Sackville, 1st Duke of Dorset; Elizabeth Colyear

Charles Sackville, 2nd Duke of Dorset PC (6 February 1711 – 5 January 1769), styled as Lord Buckhurst from 1711 to 1720 and the Earl of Middlesex from 1720 to 1765, was a British politician who sat in the House of Commons between 1734 and 1765. He then succeeded to the peerage as Duke of Dorset. He was also an opera impresario and cricketer.

== Early life ==
Sackville was the eldest son of Lionel Sackville, 7th Earl of Dorset (created Duke of Dorset in 1720), and his wife, Elizabeth Colyear, daughter of Gen. Walter Colyear. He was educated at Westminster School from 1720 and matriculated at Christ Church, Oxford in 1728, receiving an MA in 1730. He then embarked on a grand tour to Italy, which lasted from 1731 to 1733. While in Florence in 1733, he established the first Freemasonic lodge in all of Italy.

== Politics ==
Sackville was bitterly opposed, politically, to his father, and ventured to oppose his candidates in the boroughs he controlled. He became an ally of Frederick, Prince of Wales. In the 1734 election, he was defeated at Kent, but was returned as member of parliament for East Grinstead. He was appointed Captain of Walmer Castle in September. He continued to sit for East Grinstead until 26 May 1741, when he accepted the office of High Steward of the Honour of Otford.

He was returned for Sussex in a by-election in 1742, and for Old Sarum at the 1747 election. He served as a Lord of the Treasury from 1743 until 1747, and was appointed a deputy lieutenant of Sussex on 20 October 1745. He was appointed Master of the Horse to the Prince of Wales in 1747, and served until Frederick's death in 1751. Middlesex married Hon. Grace Boyle, daughter and heir of Richard Boyle, 2nd Viscount Shannon, on 30 October 1744, but they had no children.

During the 1754 election, he unsuccessfully contested Westminster, and held no seat until the next election. He returned to the House of Commons as Member for East Grinstead from 1761 until 1765.

In that year, he succeeded his father as Duke of Dorset, and also as Lord Lieutenant of Kent, and was made a Privy Councillor in 1766. However, he did not long enjoy the ducal honours. Upon his death in 1769 in London, he was succeeded by his nephew, John Sackville.

== Opera ==
After a second grand tour to continental Europe in 1737 and 1738, he returned to England in January 1739 and staged an opera, Angelico e Medoro, with music by Giovanni Battista Pescetti from a libretto by Metastasio at Covent Garden. This was intended as a showcase for the (apparently limited) talents of the soprano Lucia Panichi, La Muscovita, who was Middlesex's mistress from about 1739 to about 1742. He also had the ambition to revive full-scale Italian opera in London, which Johann Jakob Heidegger had recently abandoned at the King's Theatre, Haymarket because of its expense. Middlesex staged a season in 1739–40 at the Little Theatre, Haymarket, but he was unable to raise enough subscriptions to continue the next year. For the 1741–42 season, he entered into partnership with seven other noblemen (the second Opera of the Nobility) and they were able to continue for three years at the King's Theatre, Haymarket.

== Cricket ==
Like other members of his family, particularly his brother and his nephew, Sackville had an interest in cricket but did not achieve their level of involvement, probably because of his political activity. He is known to have played for Kent during the 1734 English cricket season in the match against Sussex which is the earliest known game at Sevenoaks Vine. His brother Lord John Sackville played alongside him for Kent, who won the game; and Sir William Gage played for Sussex.

== Bibliography ==
- Timothy J McCann, Sussex Cricket in the Eighteenth Century, Sussex Record Society, 2004
- Doyle, James William Edmund (1885). The Official Baronage of England. London: Longmans, Green. p. 630.

Parliament of Great Britain
Preceded by The Viscount Shannon; The Viscount Palmerston	Member of Parliament for East Grinstead with Edward Conyers 1734–1741; Sir Whistler Webster 1741–1742; 1734–1742	Succeeded by Sir Whistler Webster; John Butler
Preceded by Henry Pelham; James Butler	Member of Parliament for Sussex with Henry Pelham; 1742–1747	Succeeded by Henry Pelham; John Butler
Preceded by Thomas Pitt; Sir William Irby, Bt	Member of Parliament for Old Sarum with The Viscount Doneraile 1747–1754; Paul Jodrell 1751; Simon Fanshawe 1751–1754; 1747–1754	Succeeded by Viscount Pulteney; Thomas Pitt
Preceded by Sir Whistler Webster; Joseph Yorke	Member of Parliament for East Grinstead with Lord George Sackville 1761; Sir Thomas Hales, Bt 1761–1762; John Irwin 1762–1765; 1761–1765	Succeeded by John Irwin; Sir Charles Farnaby, Bt
Court offices
Vacant Title last held by The Earl of Cholmondeley	Master of the Horse to Frederick, Prince of Wales; 1747–1751	Death of the Prince of Wales
Honorary titles
Preceded by The Duke of Dorset	Lord Lieutenant of Kent; 1765–1769	Succeeded by The Duke of Dorset
Peerage of Great Britain
Preceded by Lionel Sackville	Duke of Dorset; 1765–1769	Succeeded by John Sackville
