= Lionel Sackville, 1st Duke of Dorset =

British politician

His Grace The Duke of Dorset KG PC
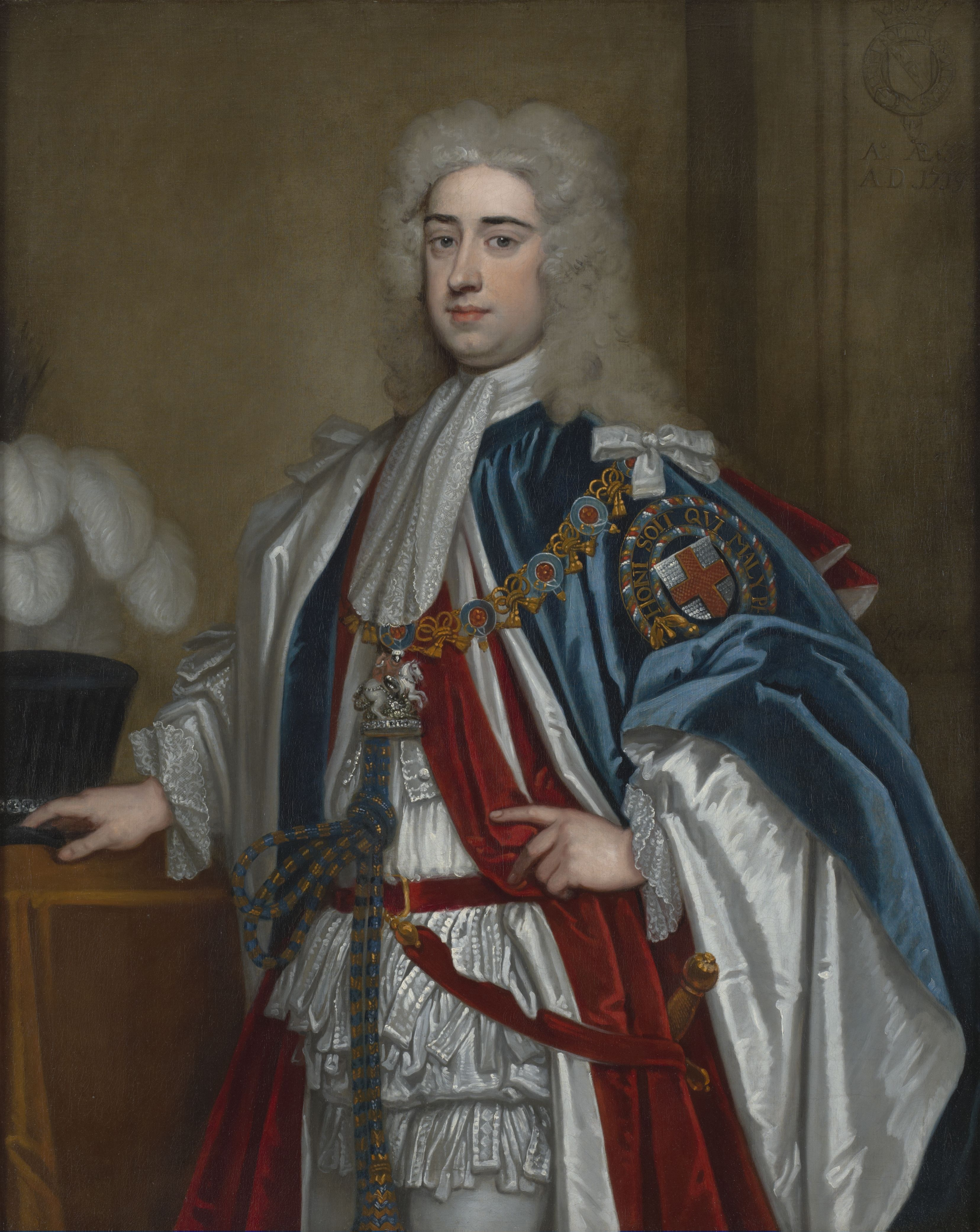
- 1719 portrait by Godfrey Kneller

Lord Lieutenant of Ireland
- In office 23 June 1730 – 9 April 1737
- Monarch: George II
- Preceded by: Earl Granville
- Succeeded by: Duke of Devonshire

Lord President of the Council
- In office 3 January 1745 – 17 June 1751
- Monarch: George II
- Preceded by: Earl of Harrington
- Succeeded by: Earl Granville

Lord Lieutenant of Ireland
- In office 15 December 1750 – 2 April 1755
- Monarch: George II
- Preceded by: Earl of Harrington
- Succeeded by: Marquess of Hartington

Personal details
- Born: 18 January 1688 Dorset, England
- Died: 10 October 1765 (aged 77) Knole, Kent
- Spouse: Elizabeth Colyear (m. 1709)
- Children: Charles; John; George; Elizabeth; Caroline
- Parents: Charles Sackville, 6th Earl of Dorset; Lady Mary Compton

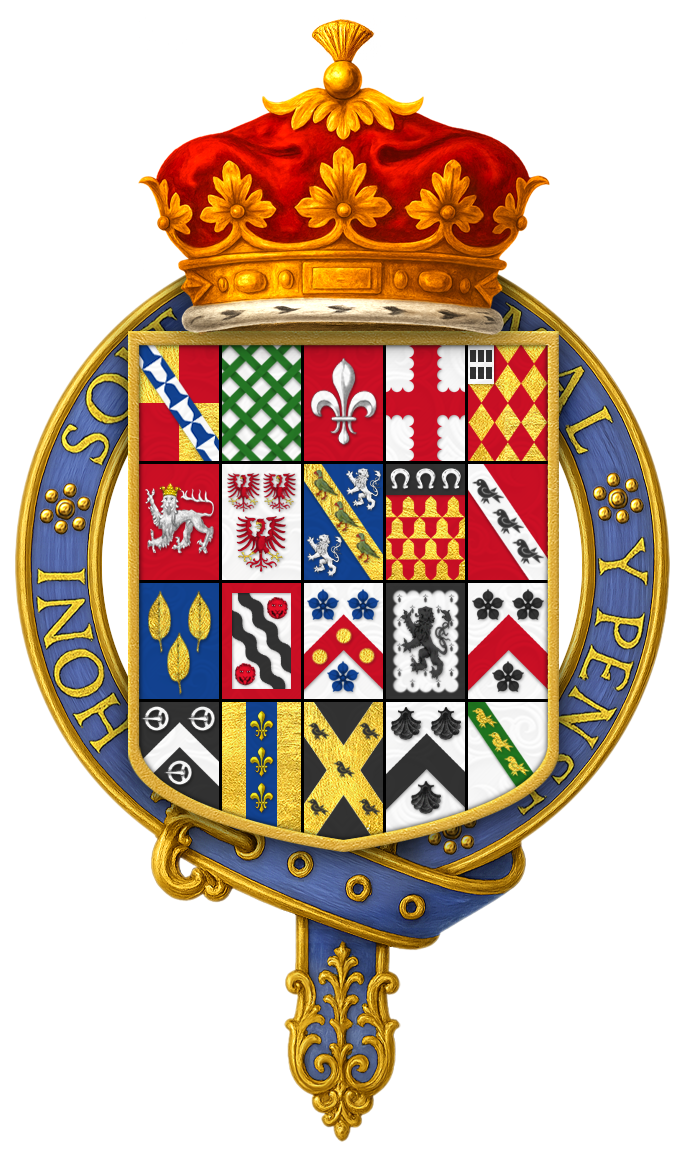
Quartered arms of Lionel Cranfield Sackville, 1st Duke of Dorset, KG, PC

Lionel Cranfield Sackville, 1st Duke of Dorset KG PC (18 January 1688 – 10 October 1765) was a British politician who served as Lord President of the Council from 1745 to 1751. He also twice served as Lord Lieutenant of Ireland from 1730 to 1737 and again from 1750 to 1755.

== Life ==
He was the son of the 6th Earl of Dorset and 1st Earl of Middlesex, and the former Lady Mary Compton, younger daughter of the 3rd Earl of Northampton. Styled Lord Buckhurst from birth, he succeeded his father as 7th Earl of Dorset and 2nd Earl of Middlesex in 1706, and was created Duke of Dorset in 1720.

Perhaps because he had been on a previous diplomatic mission to Hanover, he was chosen to inform George I of his accession to the Crown in August 1714. George I initially favoured him and numerous offices and honours were given to him: Privy Councillor, Knight of the Garter, Groom of the Stole, Lord Steward, Governor of Dover Castle and Warden of the Cinque Ports. At George I's coronation he carried the sceptre: at the coronation of George II he was Lord High Steward and carried St Edward's Crown. He quarrelled with the King in 1717 and was told his services were no longer required, but was made a duke three years later.

=== Lord Lieutenant of Ireland ===
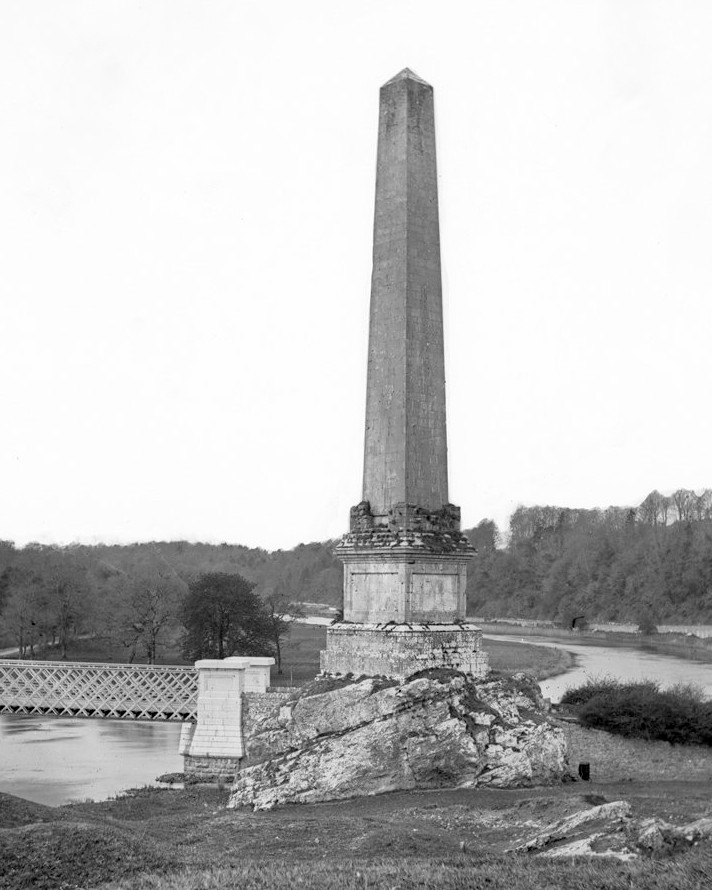
The Boyne Obelisk, which Sackville laid the foundation stone for on 17 April 1736. It was destroyed in 1923.

Dorset served twice as Lord Lieutenant of Ireland, from 1731 to 1737 and again from 1751 to 1755. In 1739, at the foundation of the Foundling Hospital, he was one of that charity's original governors. His first term as Lord Lieutenant was uneventful. His second took place at a time of acute political tension between the two main factions in the Irish Government, one led by Henry Boyle, the Speaker of the Irish House of Commons, the other by George Stone, the Anglican Archbishop of Armagh. Dorset, now heavily influenced by his son George Sackville, made the mistake of openly backing the Archbishop. He was unable to oust Boyle from power, and was accused of being the Archbishop's tool. He became extremely unpopular, leading to his eventual recall.

The current O'Connell Street in Dublin was named in his honour Sackville Street until 1924.

=== Last years ===
His last years were uneventful, apart from a riot in 1757 caused by the passage of the Militia Act to raise an army for the Seven Years' War, in which he narrowly escaped injury. He died at Knole on 9 October 1765 and was buried at Withyham in Sussex.

== Character ==
Horace Walpole gave this sketch of his character: "with the greatest dignity in his appearance, he was in private the greatest lover of buffoonery and low company.... he was never thought to have wanted a tendency to power, in whatever hands it was, or was likely to be". Jonathan Swift thought him one of the most agreeable and well-informed men, and best conversationalists, he had ever met. Even harsh critics admitted his dignity and perfect decorum, a last legacy of the manners of the Court of Queen Anne.

== Family ==
He married Elizabeth Colyear, the daughter of Lieutenant-General Walter Colyear (brother of David Colyear, 1st Earl of Portmore), in January 1709. She later became a Lady of the Bedchamber (1714–1737) and Mistress of the Robes (1723–1731) to Caroline of Ansbach, wife of George II.

Lionel and Elizabeth's sons were:

- Charles, Earl of Middlesex (later 2nd Duke of Dorset)
- Lord John Sackville (father of John Sackville, 3rd Duke of Dorset)
- Lord George Sackville (later Lord George Germain and 1st Viscount Sackville)

They also had two daughters:

- Elizabeth, who married Thomas Thynne, 2nd Viscount Weymouth
- Caroline, who married Joseph Damer, 1st Earl of Dorchester.

Honorary titles
Preceded by The Duke of Cumberland	Lord Warden of the Cinque Ports; 1708–1712	Succeeded by The Duke of Ormonde
Preceded by The 1st Earl of Rockingham	Custos Rotulorum of Kent; 1724–1765	Succeeded by The Duke of Dorset
Preceded by The 1st Earl of Rockingham	Vice-Admiral of Kent; 1725–1765	Vacant Title next held by The Earl Camden
Preceded by The Earl of Leicester	Lord Warden of the Cinque Ports; 1727–1765	Succeeded by The Earl of Holdernesse
Preceded by The 3rd Earl of Rockingham	Lord Lieutenant of Kent; 1746–1765	Succeeded by The Duke of Dorset
Preceded by Sir Paul Methuen	Senior Privy Counsellor; 1757–1765	Succeeded by The Duke of Newcastle
Court offices
Preceded by The Duchess of Somerset	Groom of the Stole; 1714–1719	Succeeded by The Earl of Sunderland
Political offices
Preceded by The Duke of Argyll	Lord Steward; 1725–1730	Succeeded by The Earl of Chesterfield
Preceded by The Lord King	Lord High Steward; 1727	Succeeded by The Lord Hardwicke
Preceded by The Lord Carteret	Lord Lieutenant of Ireland; 1730–1737	Succeeded by The Duke of Devonshire
Preceded by The Duke of Devonshire	Lord Steward; 1737–1744	Succeeded by The Duke of Devonshire
Preceded by The Earl of Harrington	Lord President of the Council; 1745–1751	Succeeded by The Earl Granville
Preceded by The Earl of Harrington	Lord Lieutenant of Ireland; 1750–1755	Succeeded by Marquess of Hartington
Preceded by Marquess of Hartington	Master of the Horse; 1755–1757	Succeeded by The Earl Gower
Peerage of Great Britain
New creation	Duke of Dorset; 1720–1765	Succeeded by Charles Sackville
Peerage of England
Preceded by Charles Sackville	Earl of Dorset; Earl of Middlesex; 1706–1765	Succeeded by Charles Sackville
