= Anne Murray, Duchess of Atholl =

Scottish courtier and close friend of Queen Victoria

Her Grace The Duchess of Atholl VA
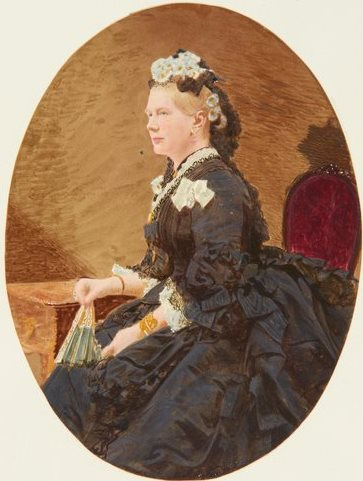
- Born: Anne Home-Drummond; 17 June 1814; Edinburgh, Scotland
- Died: 22 May 1897 (aged 82); Dunkeld, Perthshire
- Buried: Blair Atholl
- Spouse: George Murray, 6th Duke of Atholl (m. 1839; died 1864)
- Issue: John Stewart-Murray, 7th Duke of Atholl
- Father: Henry Home-Drummond
- Mother: Christian Moray
- Occupation: Mistress of the Robes, then Lady of the Bedchamber to Queen Victoria

Anne Murray, Duchess of Atholl VA (née Anne Home-Drummond; 17 June 1814 – 22 May 1897), and known as the Lady Glenlyon between 1839–46, as the Duchess of Atholl between 1846–64 and as the Dowager Duchess of Atholl between 1864–97, was a Scottish aristocrat and courtier. For 55 years, she was a close friend of Queen Victoria, who referred to her as "the dear Duchess".

== Life and career ==
Murray was born at Edinburgh, Scotland, the daughter of Henry Home-Drummond, 6th of Blair Drummond. Her mother, Christian, was the daughter of Col. Charles Moray, 15th of Abercairny and Anne Stirling (daughter of Sir William Stirling), and eventual heiress to her brother William Moray-Stirling, 17th of Abercairny. At Blair Drummond, where she spent her childhood, Anne was a neighbour of the Murrays of Atholl family at Blair Castle. She was educated in England.

On 29 October 1839, she married George Murray, 2nd Baron Glenlyon, at Blair Drummond, thereby becoming Lady Glenlyon. In 1846, he succeeded his uncle as sixth Duke of Atholl, and Anne became Duchess of Atholl.

The Duke and Duchess (who preferred the earlier spelling of Athole for their title and residence) had one child, John Stewart-Murray, 7th Duke of Atholl (1840–1917).

She served as Mistress of the Robes to Queen Victoria in Lord Derby's short-lived government of 1852. She subsequently served the queen as a Lady of the Bedchamber for almost forty years and was one of Victoria's closest friends. When The Prince Consort died, the Queen came out of the room where he had died and proclaimed, "Oh, Duchess, he is dead!"

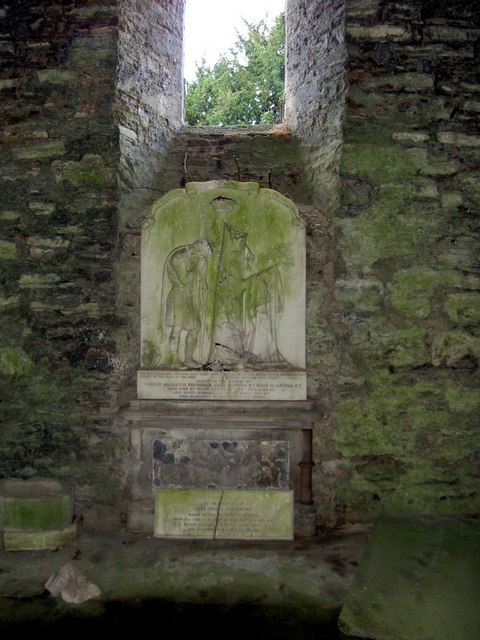
Tomb of the 6th Duke of Atholl and Anne, Duchess of Atholl, in ruined kirk of St Bride

The Duke of Atholl died in 1864, and Anne became the Dowager Duchess of Atholl. In 1892, when Gladstone again came to power, his policy of Home Rule for Ireland had alienated many of the upper classes, and no lady of ducal rank could be found who was willing to serve as Mistress of the Robes. The post therefore remained vacant, while the Dowager Duchess of Atholl and the Duchess of Roxburghe performed the duties of the office.

The Duchess of Atholl died at Dunkeld House, Perthshire, in May 1897, aged 82. The Queen sent her telegrams every two hours during the last hours of her life.

She was buried in the Murray family vault at the Old Blair churchyard.

Court offices
Preceded by The Duchess of Sutherland	Mistress of the Robes to Queen Victoria; 1852	Succeeded by The Duchess of Sutherland
Preceded by The Duchess of Buccleuch	Mistress of the Robes to Queen Victoria; 1892–1895 (pro tempore) jointly with The Duchess of Roxburghe	Succeeded by The Duchess of Buccleuch
