= Elizabeth Sackville, Duchess of Dorset =

British court official and noble

Her Grace The Duchess of Dorset
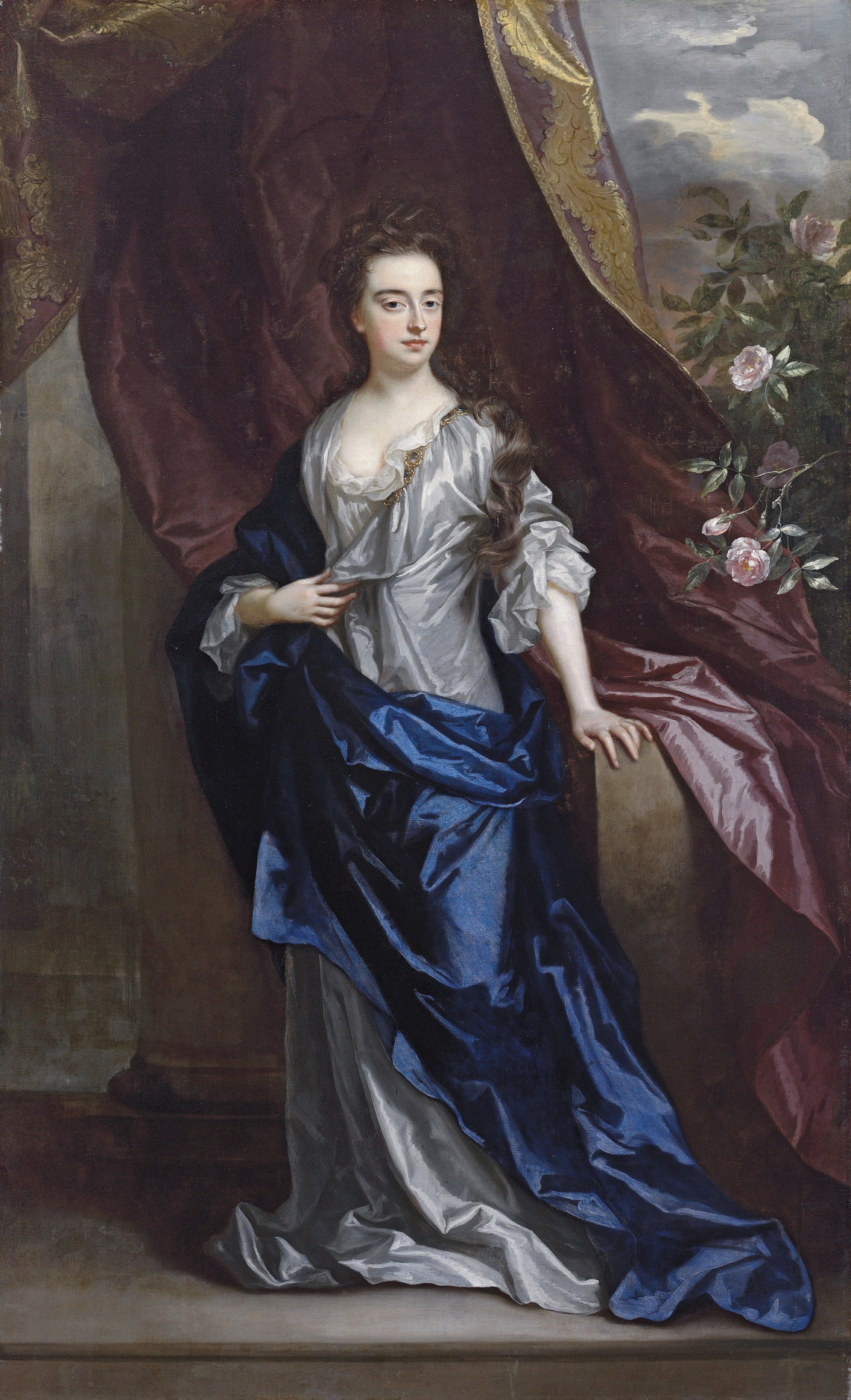
- Portrait by Godfrey Kneller
- Born: Elizabeth Colyear c. 1689
- Died: 12 June 1768
- Noble family: Colyear
- Spouse: Lionel Sackville, 1st Duke of Dorset
- Issue: Charles Sackville, 2nd Duke of Dorset; Lord John Sackville; George Germain, 1st Viscount Sackville; Elizabeth Thynne, Viscountess Weymouth; Lady Caroline Sackville
- Father: Lieutenant-General Walter Colyear
- Occupation: Maid of honour to Anne, Queen of Great Britain; Lady of the Bedchamber to Caroline of Ansbach, later Mistress of the Robes

Elizabeth Sackville, Duchess of Dorset (c. 1689 – 12 June 1768), formerly Elizabeth Colyear, was a British court official and noble, the wife of Lionel Sackville, 1st Duke of Dorset.

She was the daughter of Lieutenant-General Walter Colyear (who was a brother of the Earl of Portmore). In 1703, at the age of fourteen, Elizabeth came to court as a Maid of honour to Queen Anne, a position she inherited from her aunt Catherine Sedley, Countess of Dorchester.

They were married in January 1709, but the marriage was not made public until the duchess became pregnant. The couple had five children in all:

- Charles, Earl of Middlesex (later 2nd Duke of Dorset; 1711–1769)
- Lord John Sackville (father of the 3rd Duke)
- Lord George Sackville (later Lord George Germain and 1st Viscount Sackville)
- Elizabeth (died 19 June 1729), who married Thomas Thynne, 2nd Viscount Weymouth
- Caroline, who married Joseph Damer, 1st Earl of Dorchester.

Between 1714 and 1737 she was a Lady of the Bedchamber and to Caroline of Ansbach, wife of King George II of Great Britain. From 1723 to 1731 she was Caroline's Mistress of the Robes, a title that can be held by no one of lower rank than a duchess. The arrangements for Caroline's appearance at her coronation in 1727 were, however, made by an experienced subordinate.

Court offices
Preceded by Diana Beauclerk, Duchess of St Albans	Mistress of the Robes to Caroline, Princess of Wales; 1723–1727	Succeeded by Henrietta Howard, Countess of Suffolk
Court offices
Preceded by Elizabeth Seymour, Duchess of Somerset	Mistress of the Robes to Queen Caroline; 1727–1731	Succeeded by Henrietta Howard, Countess of Suffolk
