= Walton-on-Thames =

Town in Surrey, England

Coordinates: 51.3868°N 0.4133°W

Walton-on-Thames: Walton
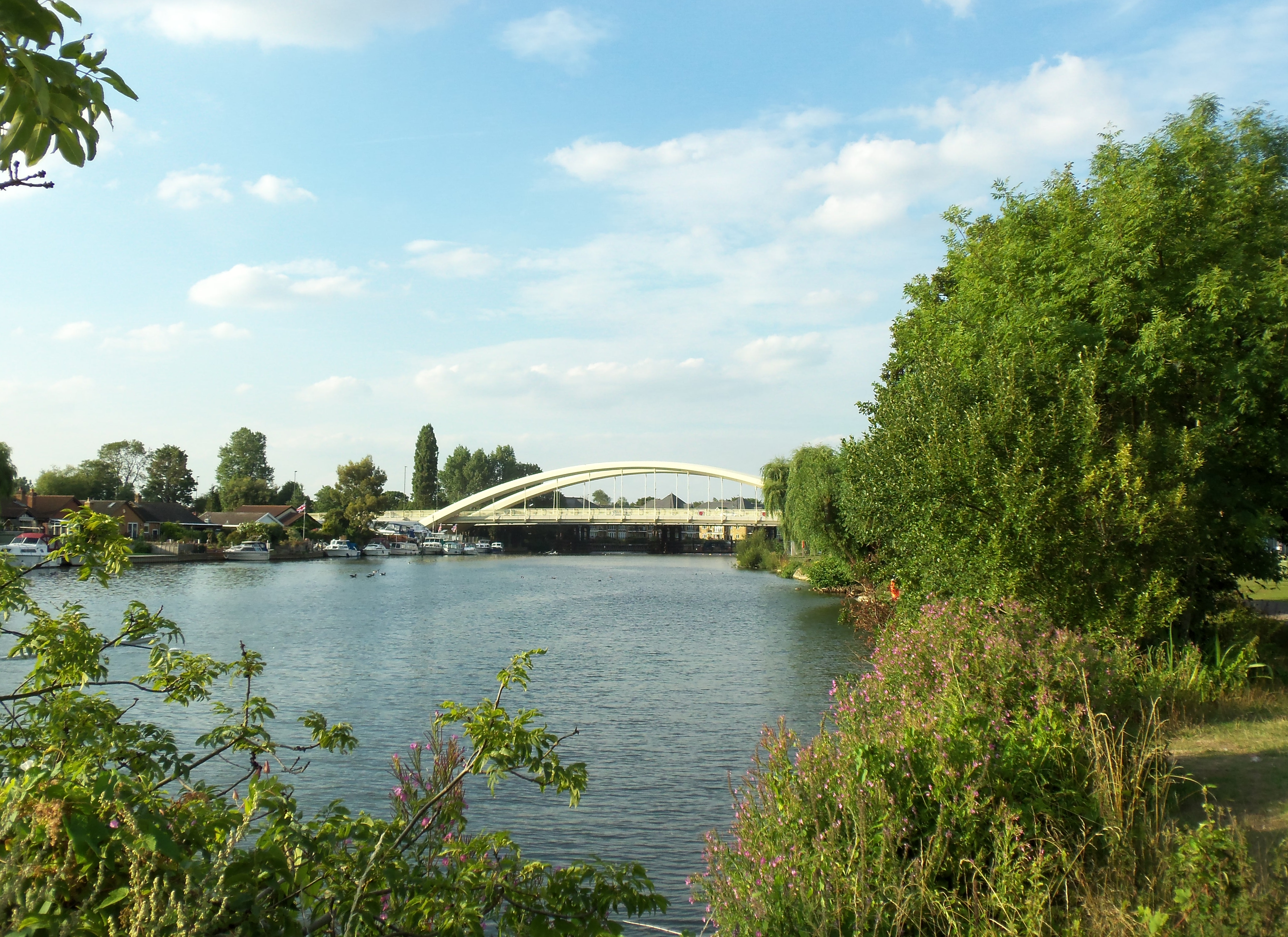
- Walton Bridge

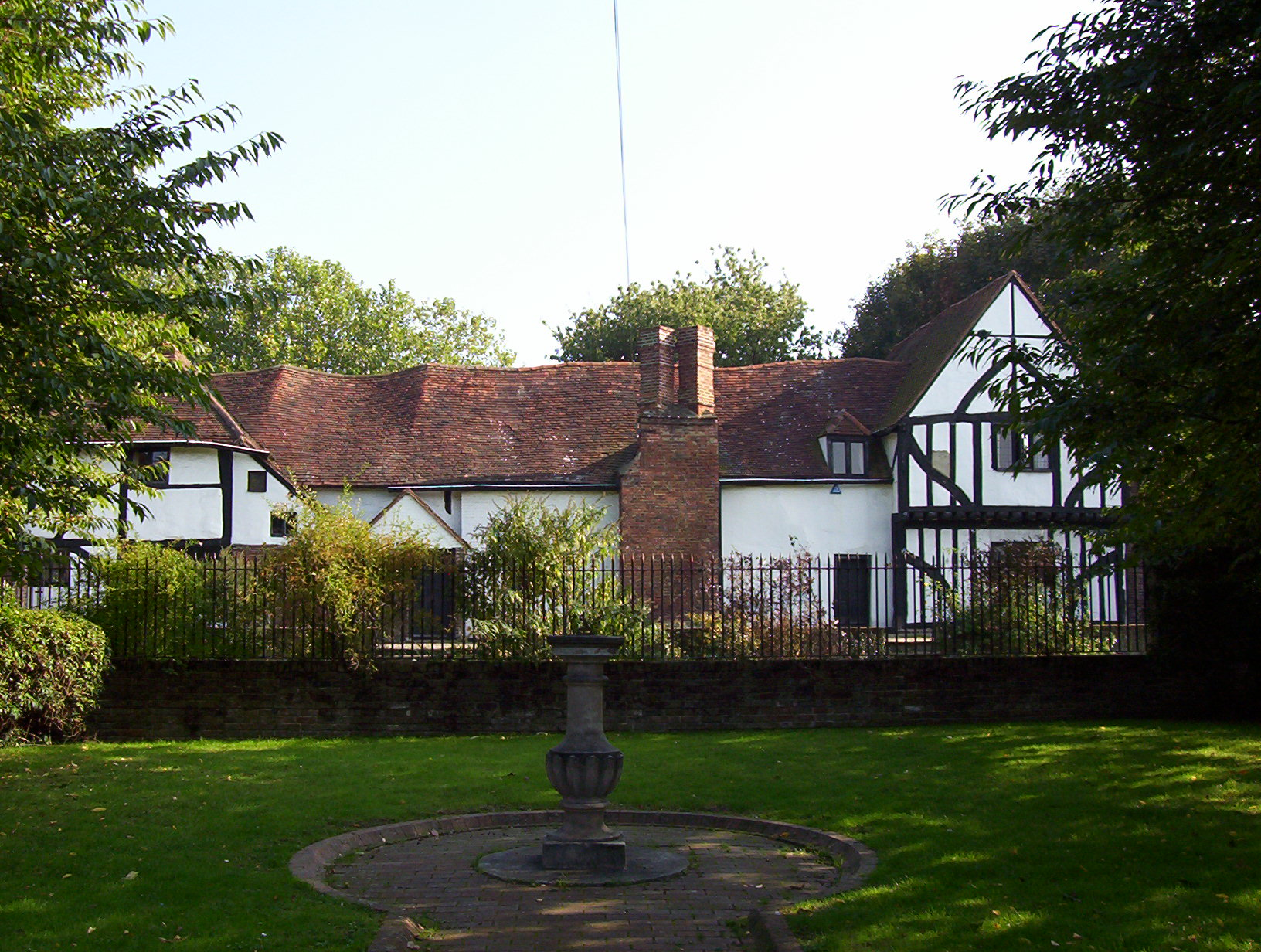
- The Old Manor House, Walton-on-Thames

- Location within Surrey
- Area: 9.66 km^{2} (3.73 sq mi)
- Population: 22,834 (2011 Census)
  - Density: 2,364/km^{2} (6,120/sq mi)
- OS grid reference: TQ103663
- Civil parish: n/a
- District: Elmbridge
- Shire county: Surrey
- Region: South East
- Country: England
- Sovereign state: United Kingdom
- Post town: WALTON-ON-THAMES
- Postcode district: KT12
- Dialling code: 01932
- Police: Surrey
- Fire: Surrey
- Ambulance: South East Coast
- UK Parliament: Esher and Walton

Walton-on-Thames, known locally as Walton, is a market town on the south bank of the Thames in northwest Surrey, England. It is in the Borough of Elmbridge, about 15 mi (24 km) southwest of central London. Walton forms part of the Greater London Built-up Area, and is served by a wide range of transport links. According to the 2011 census, the town has a total population of 22,834. The town itself consists mostly of suburban streets, with a historic town centre of Celtic origin. It is one of the largest towns in Elmbridge, alongside Weybridge.

== History ==
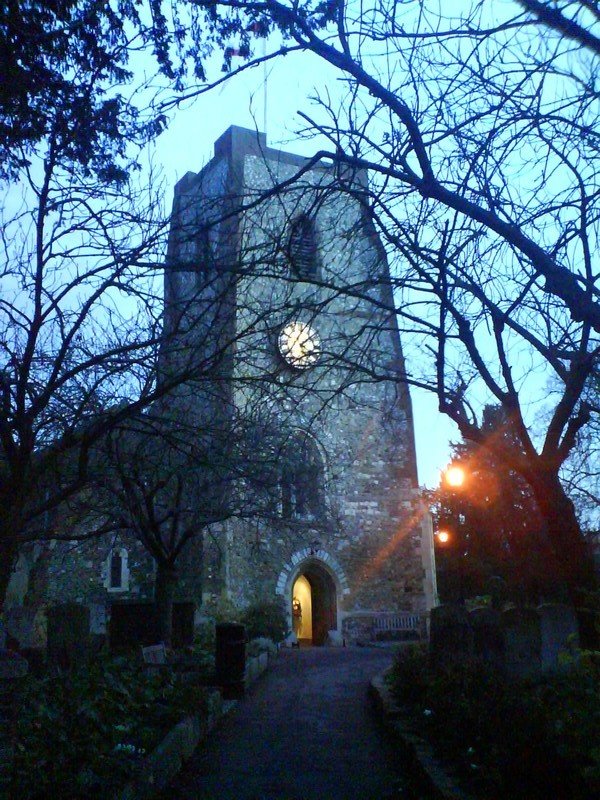
The Church of St. Mary is among the Grade I listed buildings in Surrey.

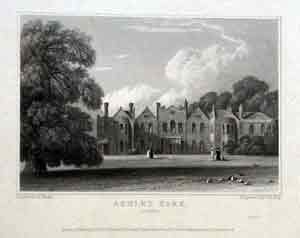
Ashley Park House or Manor House (demolished)

The name "Walton" is Anglo-Saxon in origin and is cognate with the common phonetic combination meaning "Briton settlement" (literally, "Welsh Town" – weal(as) tun). Before the Romans and the Saxons were present, a Celtic settlement was here. The most common Old English word for the Celtic inhabitants was the "Wealas", originally meaning "foreigners" or "strangers". William Camden identified Cowey Stakes or Sale, Walton as the place where Julius Caesar forded the River Thames on his second invasion of Britain. A fisherman removed several wooden stakes about thigh-width and 6 feet (1.8 m) high that were very black and hard enough to turn an axe, and shod with iron. He sold these to John Montagu, 5th Earl of Sandwich, who used to come to the neighbouring Shepperton bank to fish, for half a guinea apiece. Elmbridge Museum requires definitive evidence of these stakes, the evidence at present limited to pre 20th-century secondary sources that conflict as to detail.

Walton lay within the Anglo-Saxon district of Elmbridge hundred, in the shire (later county) of Surrey.

Walton appears in the Domesday Book of 1086 as "Waletona". The settlement was held jointly as overlords in the feudal system by Edward de Sarisber (Salisbury) and Richard de Tonbrige. Its Domesday assets were: 6 hides; 1 church (St. Mary's), 2 mills worth £1 5s 0d, 1 fishery worth 5s, 14 ploughs, 40 acres (16 ha) of meadow, supporting 50 hogs. It rendered £28.

The nucleus of the village is in the north, while later development took place in the southern manors on all sides of the railway station. About half of the land was south of the South Western Main Line. This included, from west to east, Walton Heath, Burwood manor and Hersham manor; these together became the civil parish of Hersham in the 19th century. On a smaller scale, the majority of Oatlands village, to the south-west, formed part of the town. St. Mary's Parish Church has some Saxon material and an architectural structure of the 12th century, with later additions. The square flint tower, supported by a 19th-century brick buttress, has a working ring of eight bells, the oldest bearing the date 1606. In the north aisle is a large monument (1755) by the French rococo sculptor and bust maker Roubiliac to Richard Boyle, 2nd Viscount Shannon, commander-in-chief in Ireland, who lived at the former manor and house of Ashley Park in the parish; this was demolished and its many acres subdivided in 1920. Also in the north aisle is a brass to John Selwyn (1587), keeper of Oatlands Park, with figures of himself, his wife and eleven children. An unusual relic kept in the church is a copy of a scold's bridle presented to the parish in the 17th century, which is mentioned in Jerome K. Jerome's classic Three Men in a Boat. The royal palace of Oatlands, built by Henry VIII in 1538, was a mile upstream to the west.

Walton-upon-Thames and Walton Leigh Inclosure Act 1800
- Act of Parliament
- Parliament of Great Britain
- Long title: An Act for dividing, allotting, and inclosing, the Open Common Fields, Meadows, Pastures, Commons, and Waste Lands, in the Parish of Walton upon Thames, and the Manor of Walton Leigh, in the County of Surrey.
- Citation: 39 & 40 Geo. 3. c. lxxxvi
- Territorial extent: Great Britain

Dates
- Royal assent: 20 June 1800
- Commencement: 20 June 1800 (Note: The Acts of Parliament (Commencement) Act 1793.)

Status: Current legislation

Text of statute as originally enacted

John Bradshaw lived in the Tudor manor house in the 17th century. He presided at Charles I's trial. Under the Walton-upon-Thames and Walton Leigh Inclosure Act 1800 (39 & 40 Geo. 3. c. lxxxvi) there were enclosed (privatised from common land or manorial land subjected to agrarian rights of others) 3,117 acres (12.6 km^{2}) of the Walton manors, which included holdings at Chertsey and 475 acres (1.9 km^{2}) of arable common fields.

The world's first documented game of baseball was played in 1749 in Ashley Park, on the estate belonging to the wife of Charles Sackville, Earl of Middlesex. The Earl played in the match along with his friend, Frederick, Prince of Wales.

A School Board was formed in 1878. A previously existing school was enlarged in 1881. The infant school was built in 1884. The Methodist Church, with a spire taller than the tower of the Anglican Church, was built in 1887. The Baptist Church was built in 1901.

A Public Hall, in High Street, was built in 1879 by Mrs Sassoon, who resided at Ashley Park House. This is still in existence and is visible behind the present shopfront. Ashley Park Golf Club was laid out in the 1890s, but ceased to exist prior to 1918.

During World War I, troops from New Zealand were hospitalised in the No. 2 New Zealand General Hospital at Mount Felix House, which is now demolished except for its stable block and clock tower. They are remembered by a memorial in the cemetery, where those who died at Mount Felix are buried, and one in St Mary's Church where an annual service of remembrance is held. They are also remembered in the street name New Zealand Avenue, the Wellington Pub (formerly The Kiwi), and a small memorial in the Homebase car park.

Walton upon Thames Urban District merged with Weybridge Urban District to form Walton and Weybridge Urban District in 1933.

In World War II, owing largely to the proximity of important aircraft factories at nearby Brooklands, the town was bombed on various occasions by the Luftwaffe. On 27 September 1940, fighter pilot F/Sgt. Charles Sydney, who was based with 92 Squadron at RAF Biggin Hill, died when his Spitfire (R6767) crashed in Station Avenue. He was buried in Orpington and was commemorated by a memorial plaque adjacent to the former Birds Eye HQ at Walton Court on Station Avenue, close to the crash site although this has recently disappeared with current major redevelopment of the Birds Eye site with new apartments. Hopefully the memorial will be re-erected and re-dedicated later.

Hersham and Walton Motors (HWM) constructed its own racing car in the early 1950s. Stirling Moss competed in his first Formula One Grand Prix in an HWM. HWM was the world's first Aston Martin dealership that diversified into Alfa Romeo in 2009.

Walton Town Hall, which was commissioned to serve as the offices of Weybridge Urban District Council, was designed by Sir John Brown Henson and Partners in the modernist style, featured a curved structure built from concrete with stone cladding and was completed in 1966. It became surplus to requirements and was subsequently demolished after Walton on Thames was absorbed into the Borough of Elmbridge in 1974.

At the 1951 census (one of the last before the abolition of the parish), Walton upon Thames had a population of 30,029.

The name of the town has resurfaced in the media in March 2023 in relation to Levi Bellfield and his bid to get married while in prison.

== Demography and housing ==
2011 Census Homes
Output area	Detached	Semi-detached	Terraced	Flats and apartments	Caravans/ temporary/ mobile homes	Shared between households
Walton Ambleside	241	840	244	237	1	0
Walton Central	825	545	429	1,257	0	7
Walton North	323	841	884	736	3	0
Walton South	924	585	399	735	0	0

The accommodation included 28% detached houses, and 22.6% apartments.

2011 Census Key Statistics
Output area	Population	Households	% Owned outright	% Owned with a loan	hectares
Walton Ambleside	4,291	1,563	26	44	145
Walton Central	6,790	3,063	33	34	190
Walton North	6,511	2,787	21	41	455
Walton South	6,545	2,643	37	41	176

The proportion of households in the town who owned their home outright compares to the regional average of 35.1%. The proportion who owned their home with a loan compares to the regional average of 32.5%. The remaining % is made up of rented dwellings (plus a negligible % of households living rent-free).

=== Demographic change ===
For information on the 1851–1901 change in population see Transport below. In 2001 and after boundary changes the population was just over 1,500 lower at 22,834. According to the 2001 census, the population of central Walton was 5,862, with Elmbridge's population being 121,936. Central Walton had a male population of 2,791 against Elmbridge's male population of 58,867, and the female population of central Walton was 3,071 against Elmbridge's 63,069.

== Commerce ==
The GSS (ONS specifically) identifies a Built-up Area of its name generally cited for other articles of this work as to their populations e.g. Guildford, Salisbury, which has a population of 66,566 and extends to Hersham, Sunbury-on-Thames and Shepperton.

The Heart of Walton is the name given to the re-development of Walton town centre alongside the relatively short High Street. This main area of the town centre was built in the 1960s and had become run down owing to poor maintenance. The redevelopment includes a shopping mall and 279 one- and two-bedroom apartments, many with views over the private gardens, avenues and public section of Ashley Park. The main part of the centre, a covered walkway has several brand retailers. The public library was moved here in June 2008.

Further redevelopment has upgraded or built new shops, widening the scope high-end fashion, jewellery, bakery and supermarkets. Restaurants along the New Zealand Avenue side of The Heart include three independents. Further restaurants exist along the High Street axis and at the far north-eastern and southern parades within the town boundaries. Around the periphery automotive, construction and landscaping businesses have a large presence and the Walton station area has a number of headquarters sized office buildings. As well as this, the long-awaited redevelopment of Walton bridge finished in 2013.

== Transport ==
Walton-on-Thames is served by Walton-on-Thames railway station, which provides 4 trains per hour to London Waterloo, consisting of 2 semi-fast services and 2 stopping services, with the semi-fast services taking only 25 minutes to reach the terminus. This has proven pivotal to the demographics and to the nature and degree of the town's development – in 1851 its population was 4,106 which more than quadrupled in the 60 years to 1911, when its population reached 19,142.

Walton has regular bus services supported by Surrey County Council to nearby towns Weybridge, Shepperton, Hersham, Molesey and Kingston-upon-Thames. A pleasure boat service runs regularly on a stretch of the river that includes a loop around Desborough Island.

Local taxis: there is taxi rank at the Walton-on-Thames Station for approximately 12 taxi cars, which is served between 6:30am and 1:00am.

=== Walton Bridge ===
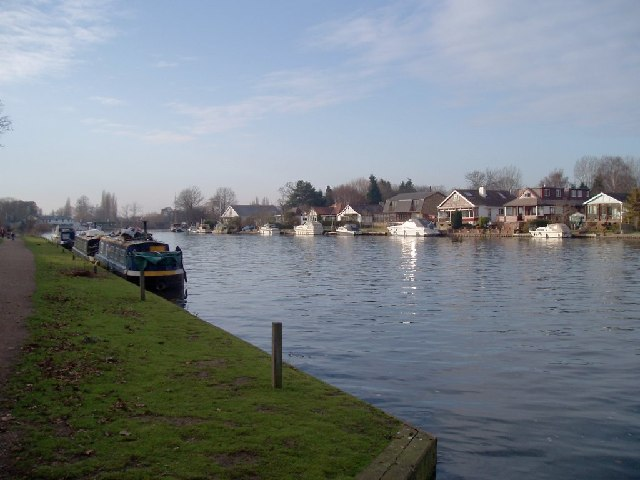
Barges moored by the towpath – Walton Marina in the background

Six versions of Walton Bridge have crossed the Thames, each westward, to Shepperton. Before the first bridge there was a ferry which went back at least to the early 17th century.

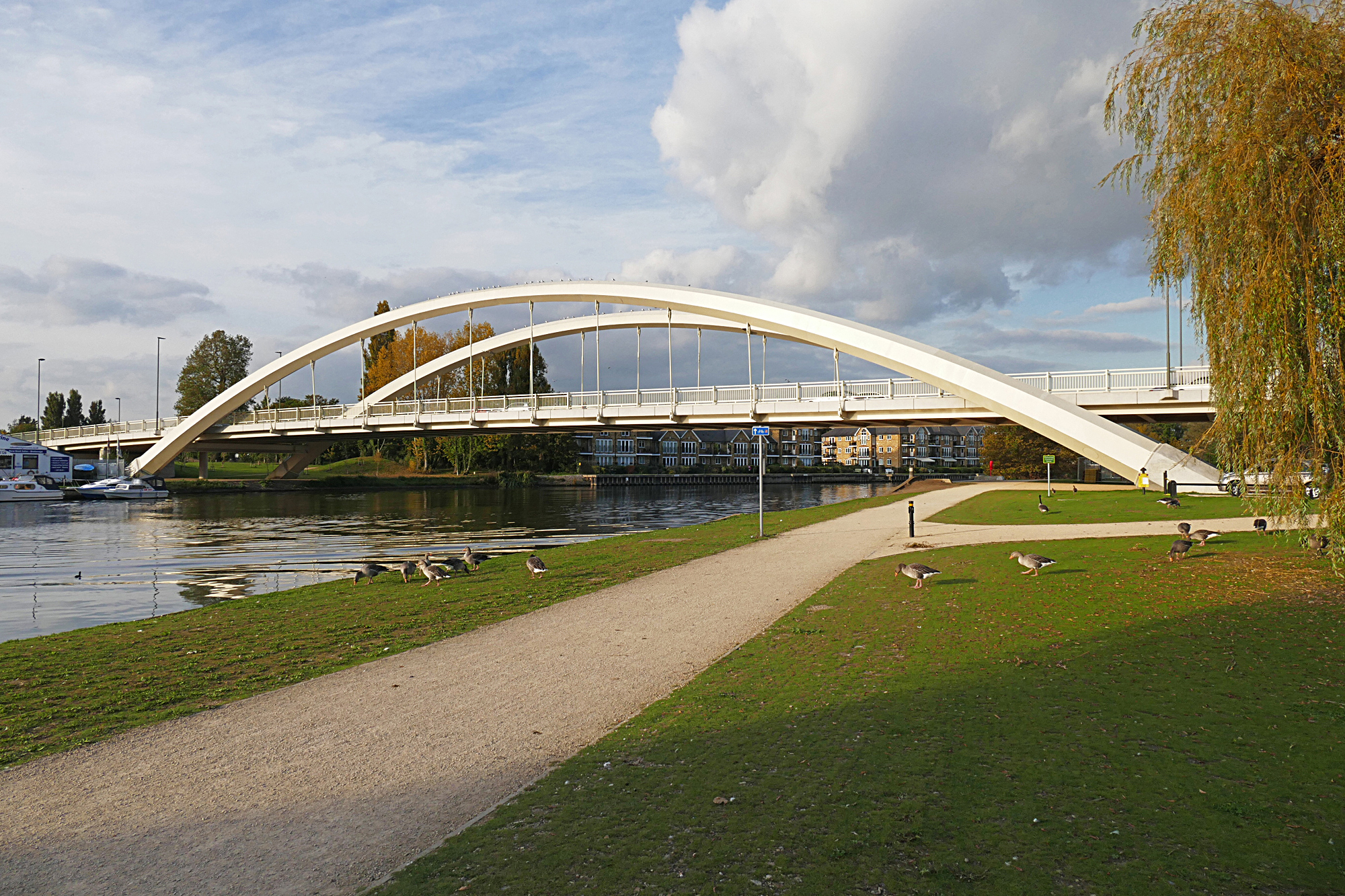
Walton Bridge – opened 2013.

The first bridge, constructed between 1748 and 1750, was a timber structure that stood until 1783. Canaletto painted a picture of this bridge in 1754. The painting, which shows the rococo-style of this bridge, may be seen in the Dulwich Picture Gallery.

The second bridge was constructed in 1788 and stood until 1859. Constructed of brick and stone, it lasted much longer than its predecessor. This bridge was painted by J. M. W. Turner in 1805 following his sketching tour of the River Thames and River Wey.

After the second bridge collapsed a ferry crossing resumed until the construction of the third bridge in 1864. This was a girder bridge on stone piers. At the same time, a brick viaduct was constructed to span the flood plain to the south of the river. The viaduct is still standing.

The third bridge was damaged during World War II in 1940, leading to a permanent weight restriction. To alleviate this a fourth temporary bridge was constructed in 1953 on the downstream side of the old bridge; this was relegated to use by cyclists and pedestrians only until finally demolished in 1985.

The fourth bridge was constructed from prefabricated sections designed by A. M. Hamilton in 1930; built by Callender Cables Ltd, it was called the Callender-Hamilton Bridge. In 1999, the fourth bridge was replaced by yet another temporary, fifth bridge occupying the line of the original bridges. This initially had several problems and had to be resurfaced a number of times causing huge traffic disruptions. The fourth bridge was restricted for use by cyclists and pedestrians only once the fifth bridge was completed.

Building a sixth bridge began in 2011 and was completed in summer 2013, being opened to traffic on 22 July. The two previous bridges were removed. The supplemental brick viaduct to the east remains for cycle and pedestrian use. The £32.4 million bridge is single span (has no piers in the river), which increases views from upstream and downstream and particularly navigation for boats – the first such bridge heading up the River Thames. This is also the only parabolic tied-arch bridge without piers across this river.

== Sport ==
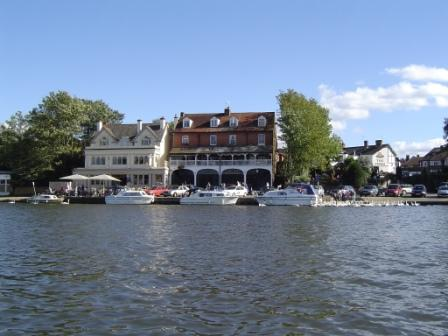
The Walton riverside

The Elmbridge Xcel Leisure Centre is to the east of the town, near the Thames. The centre includes two swimming pools, an extensive gym, indoor courts and a climbing wall.

The River Thames offers extensive opportunities for water-based sports, including rowing, canoeing, kayaking, skiffing, punting and sailing. Walton Rowing Club, Thames Valley Skiff Club and St George's College, are on the river towpath between the town centre and the Elmbridge Xcel Leisure Centre. Weybridge Rowing Club is further upstream in Weybridge.

Walton Athletics Club was founded in 1942 and is based at the new Waterside Drive Athletic Arena. The club has around 200 members ranging in age from 9 years to over 60 years old. The club provides qualified coaching in all athletics disciplines and participates in a number of different leagues to provide appropriate competition for all age groups in track and field, cross country and road running.

Walton-on-Thames Cricket Club are based in Ashley Park with the first team captained by Sam Gorvin. They will play in the Surrey Cricket Championship Division One in 2025, having previously won Surrey Championship Division Two in 2015 and 2018. Over the years, Walton have had a host of players who have gone on to further honours including Mark Bainbridge (Surrey CCC & England Under-19s), Stephen Murdoch (Wellington), Anthony Alleyne (West Indies Under-19s) and Greg Lamb (Hampshire CCC and Zimbabwe). The club now has five Saturday league senior sides and enjoyed a successful 2015 with three of the four sides gaining promotion. The club's training is run by Brian Berthoud.

Walton Casuals are a football club who are currently in the Isthmian League Division One South, a level above their neighbours Walton & Hersham. Nicknamed the Stags, they play at Church Road in a ground share with Whyteleafe while developments take place at the Waterside Drive Sports Hub. They previously played at the Waterside Stadium, just off Waterside Drive and adjacent to the modern Elmbridge Xcel Leisure Centre. The club play in a tangerine orange and black home kit and a blue and white away kit. The team moved into their new home in September 2017.

Walton & Hersham are a football club who are currently in the Combined Counties League Premier Division. Nicknamed the Swans, they play at the Elmbridge Xcel Sports Hub. The club play in a red and white home kit and a yellow away kit. In 1973, they won the FA Amateur Cup in its penultimate year, beating Slough Town 1–0 in front of 41,000 spectators at Wembley. Later that year, they achieved a shock 4–0 win over Brian Clough's Brighton & Hove Albion (then a Football League Third Division side) in the FA Cup.

== Local politics ==
Walton-on-Thames is part of the parliamentary constituency of Esher and Walton, which following the 2019 General Election became a marginal Conservative seat, with the Liberal Democrats taking second place. In the 2024 General Election the Liberal Democrats came in first with Monica Harding winning the seat. She is the first female MP to represent the constituency.

The Walton Society was founded in 1975 by the writer and intellectual Ronald Segal, and entered local politics in 1980 with Gordon Chubb who served until his death in 2006. At one point there were nine Society councillors in all four Walton wards during the period of Residents Groups' control of Elmbridge from the 1990s to 2006. Following the 2012 elections, the Society held all three Walton Central seats, with the Conservatives holding all eight seats in the Ambleside, North and South wards. Following the 2024 elections, The Walton Society had only one Walton Central seat remaining, whilst the Conservatives held no seats in any ward.

== Notable people ==
The following people(s) were born in Walton-on-Thames:

- Julie Andrews, actress, singer and author, in 1935
- Matthew Brittin, President of EMEA Business & Operations for Google, in 1968.
- George Brydges Rodney (1718–1792), Royal Navy Admiral.
- Samuel Croxall (c. 1690–1752), noted for his edition of Aesop's Fables.
- Sean Emmett, Grand Prix motorcycle road racer, in 1970.
- Susan Ertz (1894–1985), author.
- Bede Griffiths (1906-1991), theologian and mystic.
- Luke Haines, pop musician, in 1967.
- Fred Atkins (1859–1881) a Police Constable whose murder on Kingston Hill remained unsolved and who is buried in the local cemetery.
- Nick Lowe, singer-songwriter, musician and producer, in 1949.
- Natascha McElhone, actress, in 1969.
- Ian Rank-Broadley, sculptor and designer of previous British coinage, in 1952.
- Julian Russell Story (1857-1919), American painter.
- Danny Sapsford, tennis player, in 1969.
- John Somers-Smith (1887-1916), Olympic sportsman.
- Gail Trimble, nationally headlining contestant on University Challenge, in 1982.
- Tony Walton (1934-2022), set and costume designer.
- Sarah Payne (13 October 1991 – July 2000), a high-profile British child abduction and murder victim.
- Alan Permane, Team Principal of Racing Bulls Formula One team, former Sporting Director of Alpine F1 Team, in 1967.

The following people(s) have been residents of Walton-on-Thames:

- Madeleine Albright, former US Secretary of State, lived in the town during World War II.
- John Vincent Cain, minor British fraudster and aviator.
- Milly Dowler (1988–2002), school student murdered by Levi Bellfield.
- Hugh Gusterson, author and professor, grew up in Walton.
- Richard Murdoch, actor.
- Fay Ripley, actress, grew up in Walton.
- Janek Schaefer, artist, won the 'British Composer of the Year Award in Sonic Art' 2008, and UK 'Best Mobile DJ Award' 2020.
- Eileen Sheridan, model.
- John Strachan MC (1896–1988), cricketer and British Army officer.
- Joe Fagin, actor and singer, was living in Walton before his death.

== In film and television ==
Some of the sketches for Monty Python were filmed in Walton. Walton Town Hall could be seen in one sketch.

Location scenes for the cinema film Psychomania (1973) were shot in Walton, including the town's centre.

ITV sitcom Is It Legal? was shot in Walton. The Adventures of Robin Hood was filmed at Nettlefold Studios in Walton.

Series 8 of BBC sitcom Not Going Out features aerial views of Walton-on-Thames between scenes.

The 1956 film Find the Lady was filmed in Walton.

== In the media ==
The Walton Hop was a teen disco started by Deniz Corday in 1958, and ran until 1990. It is reputed to have been the first public disco in the UK, popular with thousands of teenagers from surrounding areas. Musician Luke Haines, born in Walton, released a record titled "The Walton Hop" in 2006. During the 1970s and 1980s, it was frequented by now-convicted child sex offenders such as former Radio 1 DJ Chris Denning, Tam Paton (manager of the Bay City Rollers) and Jonathan King.

== Localities ==
With exact definition

- Ashley Park

Variously defined

- Apps Court (a former manor)
- Old Walton
- Halfway
- Rydens (a former manor)
- Ambleside

Reclassified

- Oatlands broke away from the parish and was made part of Weybridge post town in the 19th century
