= Elizabeth Thynne, Viscountess Weymouth =

Elizabeth Thynne
- Viscountess Weymouth
- Born: Lady Elizabeth Sackville c.1711
- Died: 19 June 1729
- Buried: Longbridge Deverill
- Noble family: Sackville
- Spouse: Thomas Thynne, 2nd Viscount Weymouth
- Father: Lionel Sackville, 1st Duke of Dorset
- Mother: Elizabeth Sackville, Duchess of Dorset

Elizabeth Thynne, Viscountess Weymouth (c.1711 – 19 June 1729), formerly Lady Elizabeth Sackville, was the wife of Thomas Thynne, 2nd Viscount Weymouth.

Elizabeth was the eldest daughter of Lionel Sackville, 1st Duke of Dorset, and his wife Elizabeth.

At the age of four, Thynne had inherited Longleat House and its estates in addition to the viscountcy. Elizabeth married him on 6 December 1726 at Whitehall, London.

It was reported that the viscountess died "before cohabitation", although this was more than two years after their marriage; they had no children. At the time of her death, her husband was "on his travels". She was buried at Longbridge Deverill, Wiltshire, the traditional burial-place of the Thynne family.

At this time, aristocratic children were married very young; (it would have been an arranged marriage) after their wedding, both of them would have returned home to complete their education and would not have started living together until they were old enough. (This custom was dying out) Thomas "was on his travels" probably meant that he was on the Grand Tour, so he would have been on the Continent. (Charles Lennox, 2nd Duke of Richmond)

Following her death, the viscount married again, his second wife being Lady Louisa Carteret.
