= Dyne (name) =

Dyne is a name. Notable people with the name include:

- John Dyne (disambiguation), multiple people
  - John Dyne (MP for Hythe)(?-1412/13), an English politician
  - John Dyne (MP for East Grinstead)(fl. 1383–1414), an English politician.
  - John Bradley Dyne (?-?), headmaster of Highgate School from 1838 to 1874
- Dyne Fenton Smith (1890–1969), English rugby union player

== See also ==
- Dyne, a unit of force
- Van Dyne (disambiguation)
- Dine (disambiguation)
- Dyn (disambiguation)
- Dynes, surname
