= Woghere =

Woghere is an English surname. Notable people with the surname include:

- John Woghere, MP for East Grinstead in 1414 and 1421, son of Richard
- Richard Woghere, MP for East Grinstead in 1388, 1399, 1402 and 1407
