= John Alfray =

John Alfray may refer to:

- John Alfray (fl. 1360s), MP for East Grinstead in 1360s, father of John Alfray (fl. 1391)
- John Alfray (fl. 1391), MP for East Grinstead in 1391
- John Alfray (fl. 1421–1422), MP for East Grinstead in December 1421 and 1422
- John Alfray (fl. 1447–1459), MP for East Grinstead
