= Alfray =

Alfray may refer to:

- Alfray, character in Orcs: First Blood
- John Alfray (disambiguation)
