= John Swynnerton =

English politician

Lord Mayor of the City of London
- In office 1612
- Preceded by: Sir James Pemberton
- Succeeded by: Sir Thomas Myddelton

Member of Parliament for Petersfield
- In office 1601 Serving with William Kingswell
- Preceded by: William Kingswell; Thomas Hanbury
- Succeeded by: Sir William Hervey; Sir William Kingswell

Member of Parliament for East Grinstead
- In office 1604–1611 Serving with Sir Henry Compton
- Preceded by: Sir Henry Compton; George Rivers
- Succeeded by: Sir Henry Compton; George Rivers

Personal details
- Died: 8 December 1616

Sir John Swynnerton (died 8 December 1616) was an English politician who sat in the House of Commons between 1601 and 1611. He was Lord Mayor of London in 1612.

He was born the son of John Swynnerton of Dudleston, Shropshire.

Swynnerton was a member of the Worshipful Company of Merchant Taylors. In 1601, he was elected Member of Parliament for Petersfield. He was elected alderman of the City of London for Cripplegate ward on 22 June 1602 and was Sheriff of London from 1602 to 1603. He was knighted on 26 July 1603.

In 1604, he was elected MP for East Grinstead and sat until 1611. From 1606 to 1607 he was Master of the Merchant Taylors Company, hosting a great banquet for King James I at Merchant Taylors' Hall. He was elected Lord Mayor of London in 1612. In 1616 he was colonel in the South Regiment Trained Bands.

On his death in 1616 he was buried at St Mary Aldermanbury.

Parliament of England
Preceded by William Kingswell; Thomas Hanbury	Member of Parliament for Petersfield; 1601; With: William Kingswell	Succeeded by Sir William Hervey; Sir William Kingswell
Preceded by Sir Henry Compton; George Rivers	Member of Parliament for East Grinstead; 1604–1611; With: Sir Henry Compton	Succeeded by Sir Henry Compton; George Rivers
Civic offices
Preceded by Sir James Pemberton	Lord Mayor of the City of London; 1612	Succeeded by Sir Thomas Myddelton
