= Hilda Buckmaster =

- Born: January 1897; Brentford, Middlesex
- Died: April 1993 (aged 96)
- Education: London School of Economics
- Political party: Liberal
- Relatives: Stanley Buckmaster (uncle)

Dr Hilda Mary Adela Buckmaster BSc. (January 1897 – April 1993), was a British academic and Liberal Party politician. She was notably a naval officer in both World Wars for the Women's Royal Naval Service.

== Background ==
Hilda Buckmaster was born in Brentford, Middlesex in 1897. She was the daughter of Charles Alexander Buckmaster and Lucy Ormerod Mar. She was the niece of Stanley Buckmaster, 1st Viscount Buckmaster, who served in the Liberal Government led by H. H. Asquith. She was educated before the first world war at Haberdashers' Aske's School for Girls in Acton. After the war in 1919 she continued her studies at the London School of Economics. In 1922 while researching for her doctorate in International Relations, she was chosen by David Lloyd George's government to travel to Germany as a British commissioner to study municipal affairs. She was involved in the founding of the National Union of Students holding a number of honorary posts. She was also involved in sport, representing the LSE Women's Hockey XI in the 1923–24 season. In 1924 she graduated in Public Administration. She took a post-graduate course in international relations in 1930.

== Professional career ==
In 1914 at the age of seventeen Buckmaster volunteered with the Red Cross. In 1917 she joined the newly formed Women's Royal Navy Service, working as a motor mechanic. After graduating she spent 18 months in eastern Poland with the Quaker Relief Service, 1925–26. She worked as a deck hand on the SS Panape, a sailing ship trading between Australia and Finland. In 1936 she was appointed warden of the Women's Student Hall, at Manchester University.

In 1938, having made contact with Rose Bluhm, the wife of a Jewish mathematics teacher living in Breslau (now Wrocław in Poland), Buckmaster ensured that Bluhm's son Michael was able to attend Dartington Hall in Devon. She also enabled Michael Bluhm's friend Karl Wolfgang Plessner, later known as "Tony," the son of a Jewish doctor in Breslau, to attend Bury Grammar School. Buckmaster, who, in Plessner's memory, identified herself by a "white handkerchief tied around her arm," met Plessner at the Manchester train station in late January 1939 and drove him to his Jewish guarantors in Bury.

At the outbreak of war in 1939 she was called up by the Admiralty to serve in the WRNS as a Third Officer. She was promoted to Chief Officer. In 1946 she was appointed secretary of Crosby Hall, hostel for women undergraduates of London University. She was assistant secretary to the North Islington Infant Welfare Centre. She emigrated to Canada in 1954 and became a Canadian citizen in 1955. Following a request from the Canadian Government, Queen Elizabeth II awarded her with a silver medal for outstanding service to her country.

== Political career ==
In the early 1930s Buckmaster became active in politics with the Liberal Party. She was also active with the League of Nations Union serving for three years as the Essex Organiser. She was Liberal candidate for the Maldon division of Essex at the 1935 General Election. Following a move to Manchester she was selected as Liberal prospective parliamentary candidate for Manchester Rusholme for the general election expected to take place in 1939/1940. Due to the outbreak of war, the election was postponed. She remained prospective candidate for Rusholme up until early May 1945 before she switched to contest the Chelmsford division of Essex. In 1949 she was a Liberal candidate for North Stanley ward in the Chelsea Metropolitan Borough Council elections. She was Liberal candidate for the Holborn and St. Pancras South division of London at the 1950 General Election. She did not stand for parliament again.

=== Electoral record ===
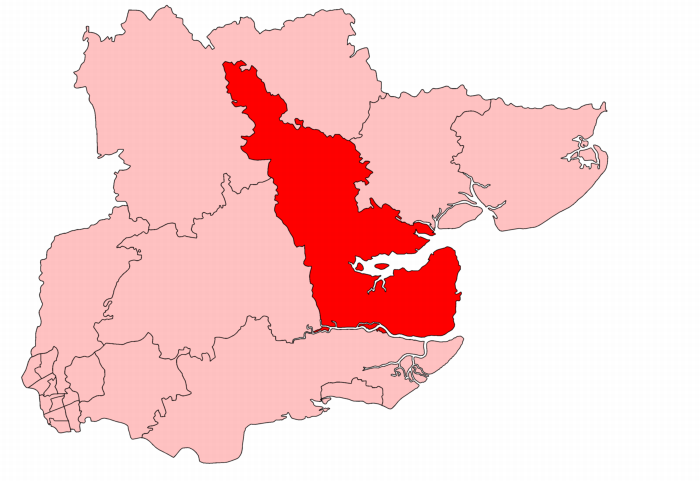
Maldon in Essex, boundaries in 1935

General Election, 1935: Maldon
Party	Candidate	Votes	%	±%
Conservative	Sir Edward Ruggles-Brise	17,072	53.4	−17.4
Labour	William Frederick Toynbee	9,264	28.9	−0.3
Liberal	Hilda Mary Adela Buckmaster	5,680	17.7	N/A
Majority		7,808	24.5	−16.1
Turnout		32,016	73.8	−0.9
Conservative hold		Swing		

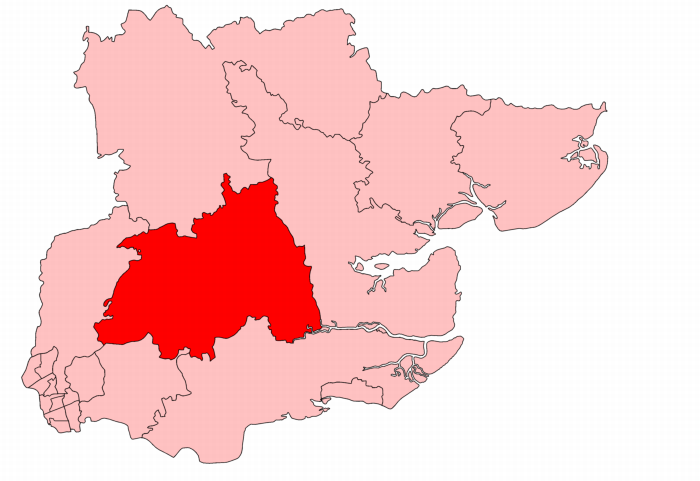
Chelmsford in Essex, boundaries in 1945

General Election 1945: Chelmsford
Party	Candidate	Votes	%	±%
Common Wealth	Ernest Rogers Millington	27,309	46.7	
Conservative	Hubert Ashton	25,229	43.2	
Liberal	Hilda Mary Adela Buckmaster	5,909	10.1	
Majority		2,080	3.6	
Turnout			73.4	
Common Wealth hold		Swing		

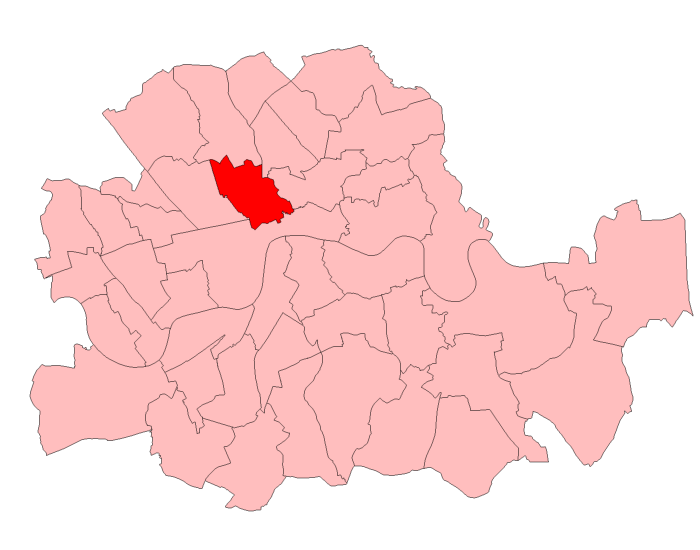
Holborn & St Pancras South in London, boundaries in 1950

General Election 1950: Holborn and St. Pancras South
Party	Candidate	Votes	%	±%
Labour	Santo Wayburn Jeger	19,223	48.5	n/a
Conservative	Peter John Feilding Chapman-Walker	17,993	45.4	n/a
Liberal	Hilda Mary Adela Buckmaster	2,411	6.1	n/a
Majority		1,230	3.1	n/a
Turnout			72.1	n/a
Labour hold		Swing	n/a	
