= Dines (surname) =

Dines is an English surname. Dines is also a Jewish Romanian surname, derived from a woman named Dina. In Yiddish, it means "Dina's children".

The surname may refer to:

- Alberto Dines (1932–2018), Brazilian journalist and writer
- Allen Dines (1921–2020), American lawyer and politician from Colorado
- Bill Dines (1916–1992), English cricketer
- Daniel Dines (born 1972), Romanian businessman
- Dev Dines (1930–2018), Australian rugby league footballer
- Dino Dines (1944–2004), English keyboardist
- Gail Dines (born 1958), American sociologist
- Griff Dines (born 1959), Scottish Episcopalian priest
- Gordon Dines (1911–1982), British cinematographer
- Hannah Dines (born 1993), British T2 trike rider
- Henry George Dines (1891–1964), British geologist
- Jared Dines (born 1989), American YouTuber and musician
- Jim Dines, American attorney and politician from New Mexico
- John Somers Dines (1885–1980), English meteorologist
- Joseph Dines (1886–1918), English amateur football player
- Lloyd Dines (1885–1964), American-Canadian mathematician
- Noah Dines, American skier
- Rebecca Dines (born 1961), Australian actress
- Sarah Dines (born 1965), British politician
- William Henry Dines (1855–1927), English meteorologist

== See also ==
- Dine (disambiguation)
- Dénes
