= William Rutter =

William Rutter may refer to:

- William Rutter (MP) (died 1451)
- William J. Rutter (1928-2025), American biochemist
