= Henry Compton (MP) =

English politician

Sir Henry Compton KB (c. 1584 – c. 1649) was an English politician who sat in the House of Commons at various times between 1601 and 1640.

Compton was the son of Henry Compton, 1st Baron Compton of Compton Wynyates, Warwickshire, and his second wife Anne Spencer, daughter of Sir John Spencer of Althorp, Northamptonshire. He matriculated at Christ Church, Oxford, on 8 June 1599. In 1601, he was elected member of parliament for East Grinstead. He was of Lincoln's Inn in 1602, and was knighted to the Order of the Bath in 1603. He was an associate of the bench in 1604.

Compton was re-elected MP for East Grinstead in 1604, 1614 and 1621. He was a ranger of Ashdown Forest and a J.P. for Sussex. By 1624 he was deputy lieutenant. He was re-elected MP for East Grinstead in 1625, 1626 and 1628, sitting until 1629, when King Charles decided to rule without parliament for eleven years. He was custos brevium, court of common pleas in about 1630.

In April 1640 Compton was re-elected MP for East Grinstead in the Short Parliament. He was subject to a fine in the aftermath of the English Civil War.

Compton lived at Brambletye, near Forest Row, Sussex. He died in or before July 1649, because on that date the committee for compounding ordered that the balance of his fine should be paid by the heirs to his estate.

Compton married firstly Cecily Sackville, daughter of Robert Sackville, 2nd Earl of Dorset; Cecily was his stepsister as a result of his mother's remarriage to the earl. They had three sons and three daughters. He married secondly Mary Browne, daughter of Sir George Browne of Battle, Sussex, and had four sons and two daughters.

Parliament of England
Preceded by George Rivers; Richard Baker	Member of Parliament for East Grinstead; 1601–1622; With: George Rivers 1601; Sir John Swynnerton 1604–1611; George Rivers 1614; Thomas Pelham 1621–1622	Succeeded by Robert Heath; Thomas Caldicot
Preceded by Robert Heath; Thomas Caldicot	Member of Parliament for East Grinstead; 1625–1629; With: Robert Heath 1625; Robert Goodwin 1626–1629	Parliament suspended until 1640
Vacant Parliament suspended since 1629	Member of Parliament for East Grinstead; 1640; With: Robert Goodwin 1640	Succeeded by Robert Goodwin; Lord Buckhurst
