= Thomas Duffield =

Thomas Duffield may refer to:

- Thomas Duffield (MP for Abingdon) (1782–1854), Tory politician
- Thomas Duffield (academic), master of University College, Oxford
- Thomas Duffield (MP for East Grinstead) (1493–1579),
