= William Hervey, 1st Baron Hervey =

17th-century English soldier and politician

The Right Honorable The Lord Hervey
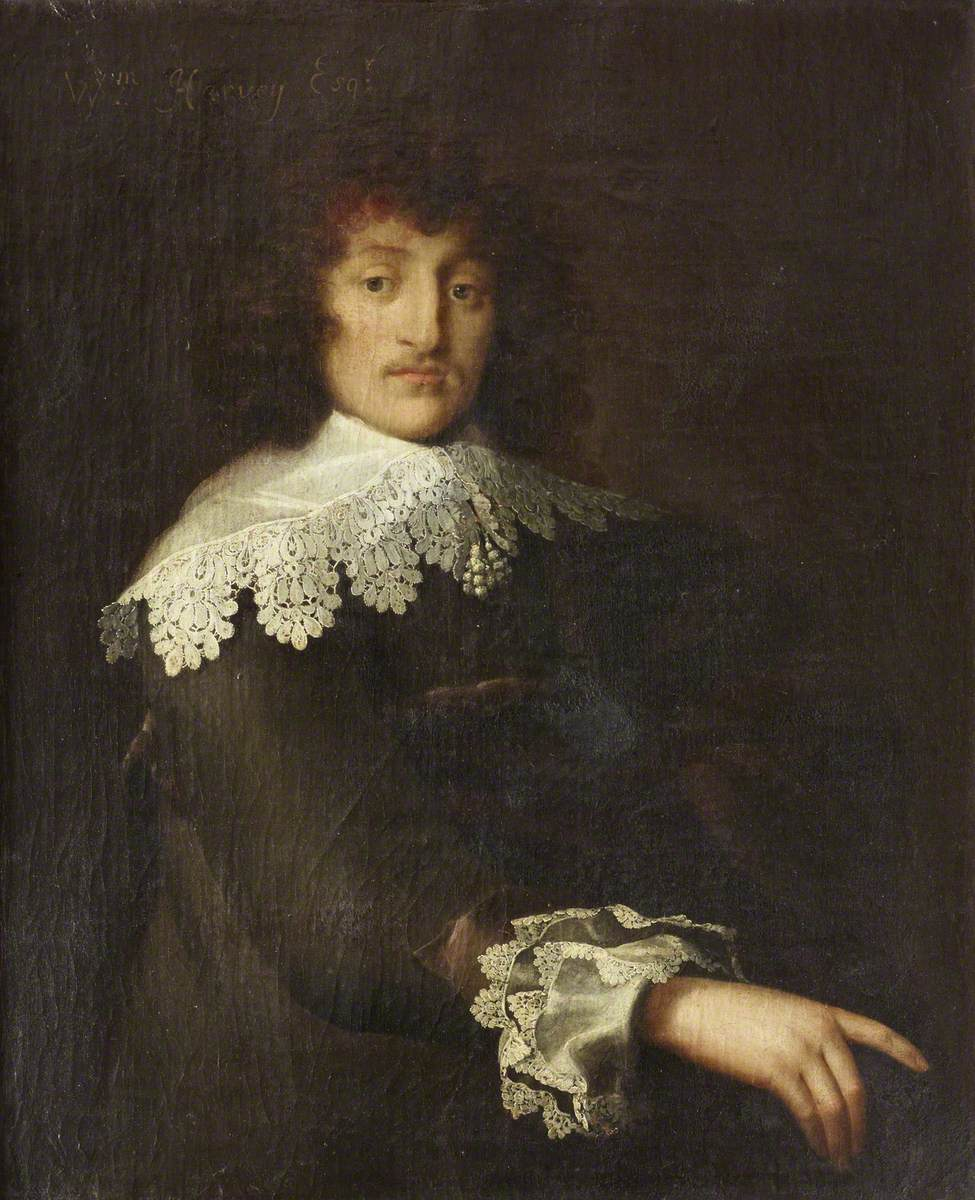
- Born: c.1565
- Died: July 1642
- Buried: Westminster Abbey
- Spouses: Mary Wriothesley, Countess of Southampton; Cordell Annesley
- Issue: William Hervey; Elizabeth Hervey
- Father: Henry Hervey
- Mother: Jane Thomas

William Hervey, 1st Baron Hervey (c.1565 – July 1642), was an English soldier and politician who sat in the House of Commons between 1601 and 1611.

== Biography ==
Hervey was the son of Henry Hervey and his wife Jane Thomas, daughter of John Thomas, of Llanvihangell. He was grandson of Sir Nicholas Hervey, of Ickworth, Suffolk. He was in service against the Spanish Armada and was knighted at Cadiz by the Earl of Essex on 27 June 1596. He served afterwards in Ireland.

In 1601, Hervey was elected Member of Parliament for Horsham. He was elected MP for Petersfield in 1604. He was created baronet of St Martin-in-the-Fields on 31 May 1619. On 5 August 1620, he was created Baron Hervey of Rosse, County Wexford. He was created Baron Hervey of Kidbrooke, Kent, on 27 February 1628. The baronetcy merged into these peerages and continued until his death in 1642, when all his other honours became extinct.

Hervey married firstly, in May 1597, Mary, dowager Countess of Southampton, widow of Sir Thomas Heneage, and formerly of Henry Wriothesley, 2nd Earl of Southampton, and daughter of Anthony Browne, 1st Viscount Montagu, by his first wife, Jane Radcliffe, daughter of Robert Radcliffe, 1st Earl of Sussex. They had no issue and she died in 1607. He married secondly on 5 February 1607, Cordell Annesley, daughter of Brian Annesley, of Lee and Kidbrooke, Kent, gentleman-pensioner, and his wife Audrey Tirrell, daughter of Tirrell, of Essex, warden of the Fleet Prison.

As the step-father of the Earl of Southampton, Hervey has been suggested as one of several candidates to be the "Mr W. H." of Shakespeare's sonnets and has also been proposed as their transmitter for publication.

Parliament of England
Preceded by John Hare; James Booth	Member of Parliament for Horsham; 1601; With: Michael Hicks	Succeeded by John Dodderidge; Michael Hicks
Preceded by Sir William Kingswell; John Swynnerton	Member of Parliament for Petersfield; 1604–1611; With: Sir William Kingswell	Succeeded by Sir Walter Tichbourne; Walter Savage
Baronetage of England
New creation	Baronet of St Martin-in-the-Fields; 1619–1642	Extinct
Peerage of Ireland
New creation	Baron Hervey; 1620–1642	Extinct
Peerage of England
New creation	Baron Hervey; 1628–1642	Extinct
