= 1918 East Grinstead by-election =

UK Parliamentary by-election

The 1918 East Grinstead by-election was held on 29 July 1918. The by-election was held due to the incumbent Conservative MP, Henry Cautley, becoming Recorder of Sunderland. It was retained by Cautley who was unopposed.

In the December 1918 elections, Cautley defeated Labour candidate Major Graham Pole.
