= Dines =

Dines is a name. It can be a surname which is either English or Yiddish, or it can be a Danish given name.

== Surname ==
- Dines (surname)

== Given name ==
Dines is a Danish given or first name with greek origins. From its greek origin, it is derived as a variant or short form of the Greek name Dionysius (or Dionysios), which means "follower of Dionysus" or "the divine one of Nysa". It is tied to the Greek god of wine, fertility, and theater, Dionysus.

- Dines Bjørner (born 1932), Danish computer scientist
- Dines Obel (born 1992), Danish businessman and entrepreneur
- Dines Carlsen (1901–1966) was an American Expressionist painter of Danish descent.

== Other ==
- Dines Green, housing estate on the west bank of the city of Worcester, England
