= 1953 Holborn and St Pancras South by-election =

UK Parliamentary by-election

The 1953 Holborn and St Pancras South by-election was held on 19 November 1953. It was held due to the death of the incumbent Labour MP, Santo Jeger. The seat was retained by his wife, Lena Jeger, the Labour candidate and a Guardian journalist and councillor on St Pancras Borough Council and the London County Council.

Jeger retained the seat at the 1955 general election by 931 votes, but lost it by 656 votes to Geoffrey Johnson Smith of the Conservatives in the 1959 general election. She regained the seat in the 1964 general election.

Holborn and St Pancras South by-election, 1953
| Party | Candidate | Votes | % | ±% |
|---|---|---|---|---|
| Labour | Lena Jeger | 15,784 | 52.11 | +1.93 |
| Conservative | W T Donovan | 13,808 | 45.59 | −0.25 |
| Liberal | I J Hyam | 695 | 2.29 | −1.70 |
| Majority | | 1,976 | 6.52 | +2.18 |
| Turnout | | 30,287 | | |
| Labour hold | | Swing | | |
