= 1965 East Grinstead by-election =

UK parliamentary by-election

The East Grinstead by-election 1965 was a parliamentary by-election for the East Grinstead constituency of the British House of Commons held on 4 February 1965.

The by-election was held following conferment of a life peerage on Evelyn Emmet.

== Previous result ==
General election 1964: East Grinstead
| Party | Candidate | Votes | % | ±% |
|---|---|---|---|---|
| Conservative | Evelyn Emmet | 29,094 | 53.18 | |
| Liberal | Richard Holme | 14,753 | 26.97 | |
| Labour | W Hill | 10,859 | 19.85 | |
| Majority | | 14,341 | 26.21 | |
| Turnout | | 54,706 | 78.0 | +0.1 |
| Conservative hold | | Swing | | |

== Result ==
It was a Conservative hold with a reduced majority.

East Grinstead by-election, 1965
| Party | Candidate | Votes | % | ±% |
|---|---|---|---|---|
| Conservative | Geoffrey Johnson-Smith | 24,896 | 54.99 | +1.81 |
| Liberal | Richard Holme | 14,279 | 31.54 | +4.57 |
| Labour | Jon Evans | 6,101 | 13.48 | −6.37 |
| Majority | | 10,617 | 23.44 | −2.77 |
| Turnout | | 45,276 | 64.5 | −13.5 |
| Conservative hold | | Swing | -1.4 | |
