= Edward Sackville (1644–1678) =

17th-century English politician

Hon. Edward Sackville

Personal details
- Born: 2 April 1644
- Died: 10 October 1678 (aged 34)
- Occupation: Politician

Edward Sackville (2 April 1644 – 10 October 1678), styled Honourable was an English soldier and politician who sat in the House of Commons during the Restoration period. A younger son of the Sackville family, he combined military service with parliamentary duties, representing East Grinstead from 1675 until his death.

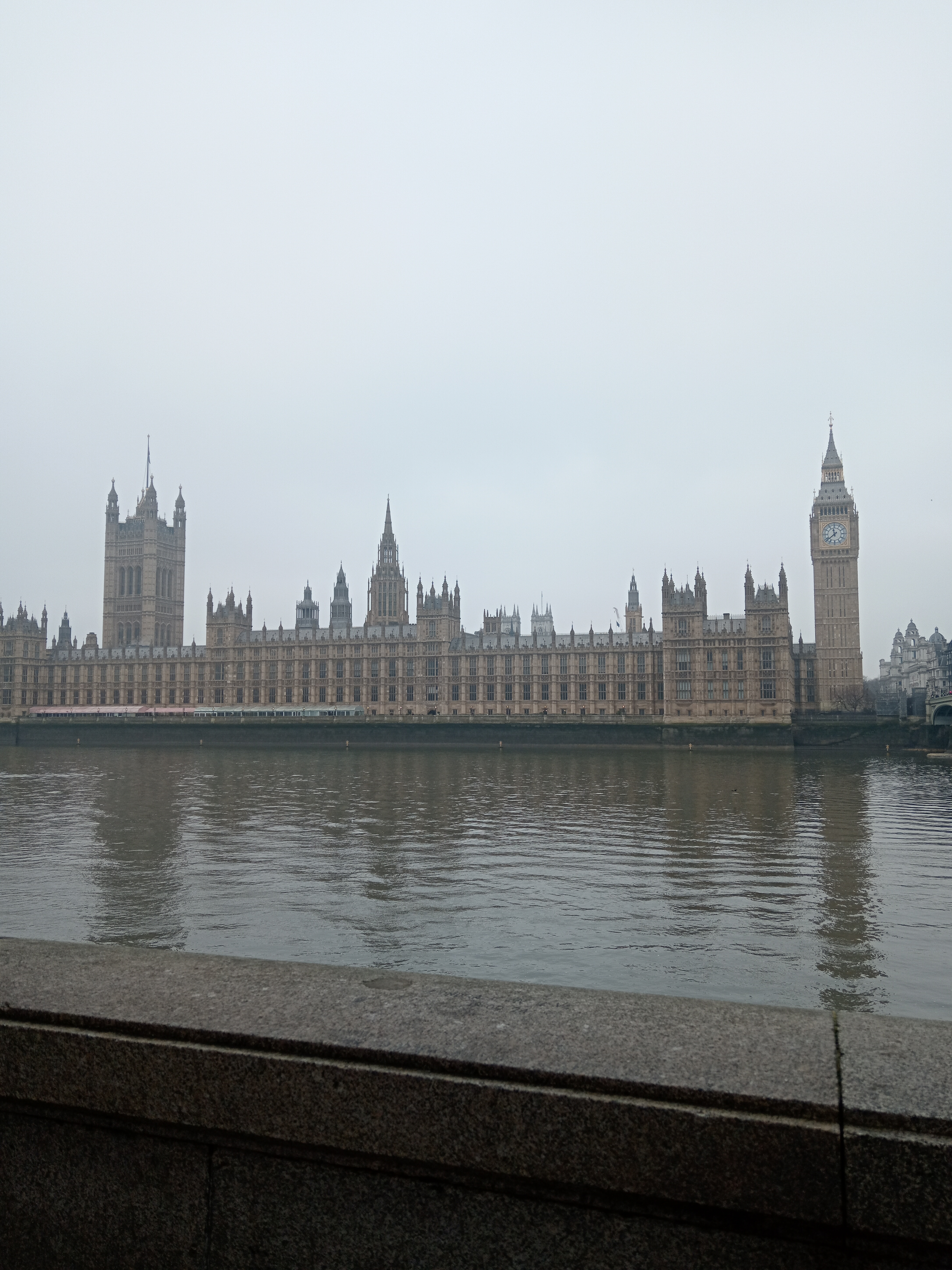
The Palace of Westminster, seat of the House of Commons and House of Lords (CC0 public domain).

== Early life ==
Sackville was born in 1644, the second son of Richard Sackville, 5th Earl of Dorset. His elder brother Charles Sackville later became the 6th Earl of Dorset and 1st Earl of Middlesex. He was educated at Westminster School and travelled in France in 1658.

== Career ==
In 1668 Sackville was appointed Ensign in the Yeomen of the Guard. He later became captain in the Duke of Buckingham's regiment (1672–73) and served in the 1st Foot Guards from 1673 until his death.

He entered Parliament in 1675 as MP for East Grinstead, a seat he held until 1678. He also served as Justice of the Peace for Sussex and Commissioner for Assessment.

== Personal life ==
He lived at Bow Street, Covent Garden, Westminster and died unmarried on 10 October 1678 at the age of 34.

== See also ==
- Charles Sackville, 6th Earl of Dorset
- East Grinstead (UK Parliament constituency)
- House of Commons of England
- Yeomen of the Guard
