= John Wiseman (MP) =

Member of the Parliament of England

John Wiseman (by 1515 – January 1558), of Great Canfield, Essex, was an English Member of Parliament for Maldon in November 1554 and for East Grinstead in 1555.
