= John Heldele =

English politician

John Heldele (fl. 1388) was an English politician.

Little is known of Heldele. He had a wife named Isabel, and it is unrecorded whether they had children. They are recorded as transferring seventy acres in Fletching, East Sussex in 1361. He was a Member (MP) of the Parliament of England for East Grinstead in February 1388.
