= Dynes =

Dynes is a surname. Notable people with the surname include:

- Ernest Dynes (1903–1968), cricketer
- Kieran Dynes (born 1970), racing driver
- Robert C. Dynes (1942–2025), Canadian-American physicist, researcher, academic administrator, and professor
- Wayne R. Dynes (1934–2021), art historian
- William Dynes (1849–1935), politician

== See also ==
- Dyne, unit of force
- Dyne (name)
- Dynes Pedersen (1893–1960), gymnast
