= James Pemberton =

English goldsmith

Lord Mayor of the City of London
- In office 1611
- Preceded by: Sir William Craven
- Succeeded by: Sir John Swynnerton

Personal details
- Born: 1550
- Died: 8 September 1613 (aged 62–63)
- Spouse(s): Miss Wyrhall; Anne Hadley

Sir James Pemberton (1550 – 8 September 1613) was an English goldsmith who was Lord Mayor of London in 1611.

== Biography ==
Pemberton was born in Wrightington, probably the son of a farmer of Heskin, Lancashire. He went to London in 1567 to take an apprenticeship with Francis Heaton. He became a member of the Worshipful Company of Goldsmiths and acquired property in Twickenham probably before 1593. By 1597 had become prosperous enough to found and endow a grammar school at Heskin. The school, probably opened in 1600 with places for 200 boys.

Pemberton was Prime Warden of the Goldsmiths Company for 1600 to 1601. On 15 June 1602 he was elected an alderman of the City of London for Bishopsgate ward and elected Sheriff of London for that year. He was knighted on 26 July 1603. In 1603, he also became alderman for Castle Baynard ward. In 1607 he built a large mansion called Camden House in Maiden Lane, next to the Goldsmiths’ Hall. In 1611 he was elected Lord Mayor of London. A pageant “Chruso-thriambos – The Triumphs of Gold” was written by Anthony Mundy (1560-1633) to celebrate the occasion.

== Family ==
Pemberton married firstly a Miss Wyrhall who was from a Yorkshire family. She died in August 1599 and two months later he married Anne Hadley, née Barnard, widow of Richard Hadley, Grocer.

Civic offices
Preceded by Sir William Craven	Lord Mayor of the City of London; 1611	Succeeded by Sir John Swynnerton
