= Richard Dawson (Irish politician, born 1855) =

Irish barrister and Conservative politician

- Born: 1855
- Died: 1923 (aged 67–68)
- Occupation: Politician
- Political party: Conservative Party
- Position held: member of the 23rd Parliament of the United Kingdom (1885–1886)

Richard Dawson (1855–1923) was an Irish barrister and Conservative politician who served as a Member of Parliament for Leeds East from November 1885 until July 1886.

== Biography ==
Dawson was born at Limerick, in 1855, the son of Richard Dawson of Bunratty, County Clare. He was educated at Hertford College, Oxford and became a barrister.

Henry Chaplin was reportedly in Leeds on the evening of 21 November 1885 for a meeting of Conservatives held in the Albert Hall, Leeds, in support of the candidature of Dawson who was seeking the suffrages of the electors of Leeds East in the Conservative interest in the 1885 general election. Subsequently, Dawson was elected Member of Parliament for Leeds East, his election agent being J.W. Middleton. With Middleton again as his election agent, Dawson lost the seat against the trend in the 1886 general election. From 1885 to 1886, Dawson was private secretary to fellow Conservative politician Henry Chaplin, 1st Viscount Chaplin who was Chancellor of the Duchy of Lancaster and a life-long friend of the Prince of Wales.

Dawson died in 1923, at the age of 68.

Parliament of the United Kingdom
| New constituency | Member of Parliament for Leeds East; 1885 – 1886 | Succeeded by John Gane |
