= Leeds East =

Parliamentary constituency in the United Kingdom

Coordinates: 53.79°N 1.43°W

- County constituency for the House of Commons
- Interactive map of boundaries since 2024
- Boundary within Yorkshire and the Humber
- County: West Yorkshire
- Electorate: 67,286 (December 2019)

Current constituency
- Created: 1955
- Member of Parliament: Richard Burgon (Labour)
- Seats: One
- Created from: Leeds South East; Leeds North East

1885–1918
- Seats: One
- Type of constituency: Borough constituency
- Created from: Leeds
- Replaced by: Leeds North East; Leeds South East

Leeds East is a constituency represented in the House of Commons of the UK Parliament since 2015 by Richard Burgon of the Labour Party.

The constituency was represented by Denis Healey from 1955 to 1992. Healey served as Defence Secretary from 1964 to 1970, and Chancellor of the Exchequer from 1974 to 1979 and latterly as Deputy Leader of the Labour Party.

== Constituency profile ==
Leeds East is a constituency in West Yorkshire. It covers the eastern neighbourhoods of the city of Leeds (including Harehills, Gipton, Seacroft, Whinmoor, Cross Gates and Colton), the outlying town of Garforth and village of Swillington. Leeds is one of the United Kingdom's largest cities and grew rapidly during the Industrial Revolution as a centre for textile manufacturing, especially wool. Today the city has a diverse economy and is the largest legal and financial centre in England outside of London. Garforth and Swillington have a history of coal mining. Most of the Leeds neighbourhoods have high levels of deprivation and fall within the top 10% most-deprived areas in England; Seacroft is one of the largest council estates in the country. In comparison, Colton and Garforth are affluent and suburban. House prices across the constituency are similar to the rest of Yorkshire and lower than the national average.

In general, residents of Leeds East have low levels of education, income and homeownership. Few residents work in professional occupations and a high proportion work in business administration. White people made up 74% of the population at the 2021 census. Asians, predominantly Pakistanis, were the largest ethnic minority group at 14% and Black people were 7%. The non-White population were concentrated in Harehills and Gipton where they made up more than half the population. Most of the constituency is represented by the Labour Party at the local city council with independent councillors elected in Garforth and Swillington. An estimated 60% of voters in Leeds East supported leaving the European Union in the 2016 referendum compared to the nationwide figure of 52%.

== History ==
The constituency was created in 1885 by the Redistribution of Seats Act 1885, and was first used in the general election of that year. Leeds had previously been represented by two MPs (1832–1868) and three MPs (1868–1885). From 1885 it was represented by five single-member constituencies: Leeds Central, Leeds East, Leeds North, Leeds South and Leeds West. The constituencies of Morley, Otley and Pudsey were also created in 1885.

The constituency was abolished in 1918. After the 1918 general election, Leeds was represented by Leeds Central, Leeds North, Leeds North-East (created 1918), Leeds South, Leeds South-East (created 1918), and Leeds West.

The constituency was recreated in 1955. After the 1955 general election Leeds was represented by Leeds East (created 1885, abolished 1918, recreated 1955), Leeds North East, Leeds North West (created 1950), Leeds South and Leeds South East. There were also constituencies of Batley and Morley (created 1918) and Pudsey and Otley (created 1918, replacing Pudsey).

Labour's Denis Healey held the seat for 37 years (1955–1992) and was Chancellor of the Exchequer during part of this time.

== Boundaries ==
Map of boundaries 2010–2024

1885–1918: The Municipal Borough of Leeds ward of East, and parts of the wards of Central, North, and North East.

1955–1974: The County Borough of Leeds wards of Burmantofts, Crossgates, Halton, Harehills, and Osmondthorpe.

1974–1983: The County Borough of Leeds wards of Gipton, Halton, Osmondthorpe, Seacroft, and Whinmoor.

1983–2010: The City of Leeds wards of Burmantofts, Halton, Harehills, and Seacroft.

2010–2024: The City of Leeds wards of Cross Gates and Whinmoor, Gipton and Harehills, Killingbeck and Seacroft, and Temple Newsam.

2024–present: The City of Leeds wards of Cross Gates & Whinmoor, Garforth & Swillington, Gipton & Harehills, Killingbeck & Seacroft, and Temple Newsam (part).

To bring the electorate within the permitted range in accordance with the 2023 periodic review of Westminster constituencies, the Garforth & Swillington ward was added from the abolished constituency of Elmet and Rothwell. To partly compensate, parts of the Temple Newsam ward (polling districts TNA, TND, TNE, TNH, TNI, TNJ, TNK and TNL) were transferred out to the re-established Leeds South seat.

== Members of Parliament ==
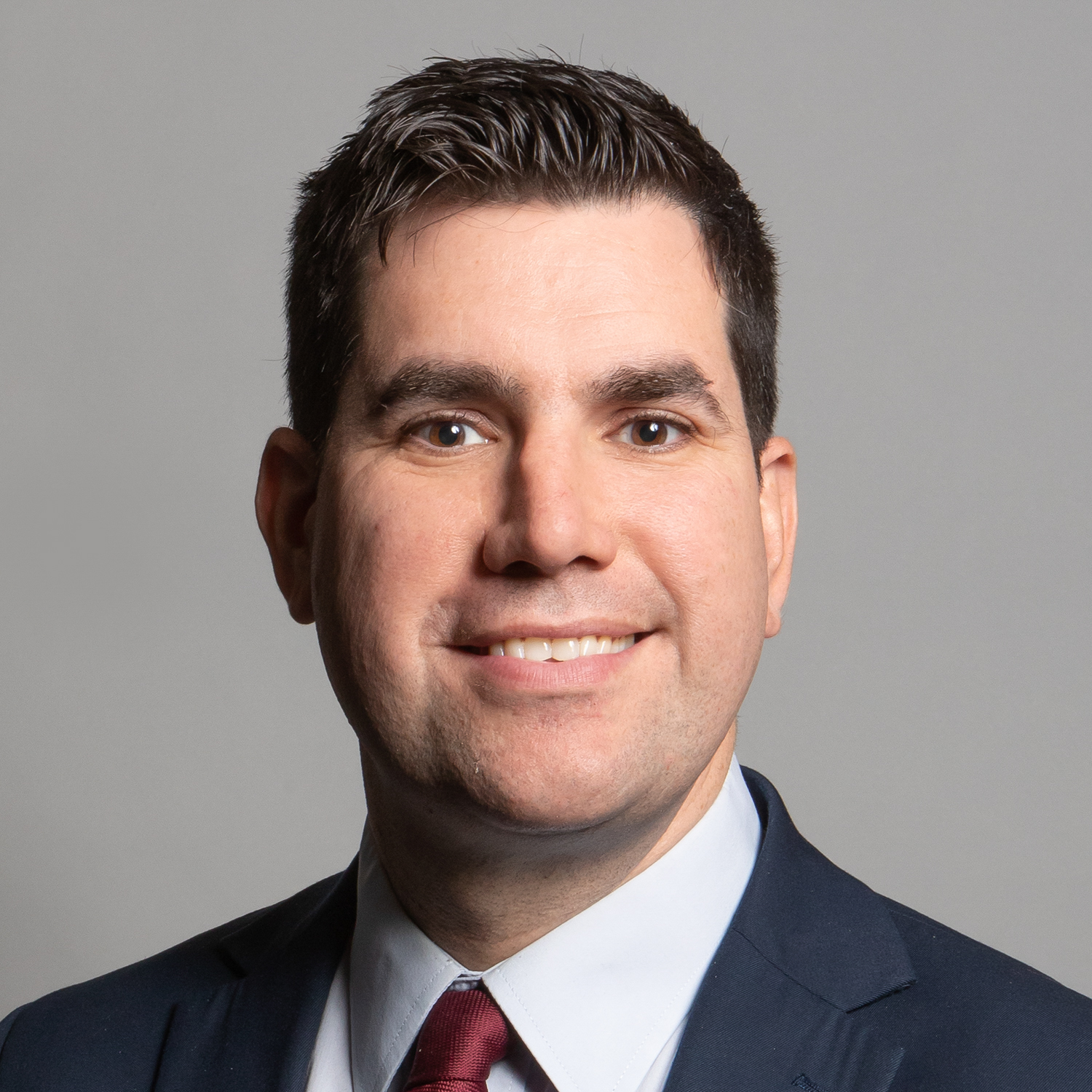
Richard Burgon, Member of Parliament for Leeds East since 2015

=== MPs 1885–1918 ===
Leeds prior to 1885

Election	Member	Party
1885	Richard Dawson	Conservative
1886	John Gane	Liberal
1895	Thomas Leuty	Liberal
1900	Henry Cautley	Conservative
1906	James O'Grady	Labour
1918	constituency abolished	

=== MPs since 1955 ===
Leeds North East and Leeds South East prior to 1955

Election	Member	Party
1955	Denis Healey	Labour
1992	George Mudie	Labour
2015	Richard Burgon	Labour
2024	Richard Burgon	Independent
2025	Richard Burgon	Labour

== Elections ==
=== Elections in the 2020s ===
General election 2024: Leeds East
Party	Candidate	Votes	%	±%
Labour	Richard Burgon	18,610	47.2	+0.2
Reform	David Dresser	7,345	18.6	+12.7
Conservative	Sam Firth	6,898	17.5	−23.3
Green	Jennifer Norman	3,506	8.9	+6.8
Liberal Democrats	Tobie Abel	1,445	3.7	±0.0
Yorkshire	David Hough	664	1.7	+1.2
SDP	Catherine Dobson	519	1.3	New
Independent	Niko Omilana	222	0.6	New
Independent	Pete Young	179	0.5	New
Majority		11,265	28.6	+22.5
Turnout		39,388	51.7	−7.3
Registered electors		76,207		
Labour hold		Swing	−6.3	

=== Elections in the 2010s ===
2019 notional result
Party	Vote	%
Labour	20,879	47.0
Conservative	18,156	40.8
Brexit Party	2,601	5.9
Liberal Democrats	1,626	3.7
Green	946	2.1
Others	243	0.5
Turnout	44,451	59.0
Electorate	75,330	

General election 2019: Leeds East
Party	Candidate	Votes	%	±%
Labour	Richard Burgon	19,464	49.8	−11.6
Conservative	Jill Mortimer	13,933	35.7	+5.1
Brexit Party	Sarah Wass	2,981	7.6	New
Liberal Democrats	David Dresser	1,796	4.6	+2.8
Green	Shahab Adris	878	2.3	+1.3
Majority		5,531	14.1	−16.7
Turnout		39,052	58.0	−4.8
Labour hold		Swing	−8.3	

General election 2017: Leeds East
Party	Candidate	Votes	%	±%
Labour	Richard Burgon	25,428	61.4	+7.7
Conservative	Matthew Robinson	12,676	30.6	+9.7
UKIP	Paul Spivey	1,742	4.2	−14.8
Liberal Democrats	Ed Sanderson	739	1.8	−1.6
Green	Jaimes Moran	434	1.0	−1.9
Yorkshire	John Otley	422	1.0	New
Majority		12,752	30.8	−2.0
Turnout		41,441	62.8	+3.8
Labour hold		Swing	−1.0	

General election 2015: Leeds East
Party	Candidate	Votes	%	±%
Labour	Richard Burgon	20,530	53.7	+3.3
Conservative	Ryan Stephenson	7,997	20.9	−2.3
UKIP	Mark Maniatt	7,256	19.0	New
Liberal Democrats	Ed Sanderson	1,296	3.4	−14.1
Green	Kate Bisson	1,117	2.9	New
Majority		12,533	32.8	+5.6
Turnout		38,196	59.0	+0.9
Labour hold		Swing	+2.8	

General election 2010: Leeds East
Party	Candidate	Votes	%	±%
Labour	George Mudie	19,056	50.4	−9.4
Conservative	Barry Anderson	8,763	23.2	+1.6
Liberal Democrats	Andrew Tear	6,618	17.5	+0.3
BNP	Trevor Brown	2,947	7.8	New
Alliance for Green Socialism	Mike Davies	429	1.1	New
Majority		10,293	27.2	−10.0
Turnout		37,813	58.1	+2.0
Labour hold		Swing	−5.5	

=== Elections in the 2000s ===
General election 2005: Leeds East
Party	Candidate	Votes	%	±%
Labour	George Mudie	17,799	59.1	−3.8
Liberal Democrats	Andrew Tear	6,221	20.7	+7.2
Conservative	Dominic Ponniah	5,557	18.6	−0.8
Independent	Peter Socrates	500	1.7	New
Majority		11,578	38.4	−5.1
Turnout		30,107	55.0	+3.5
Labour hold		Swing	−5.5	

General election 2001: Leeds East
Party	Candidate	Votes	%	±%
Labour	George Mudie	18,290	62.9	−4.6
Conservative	Barry Anderson	5,647	19.4	+0.7
Liberal Democrats	Brian Jennings	3,923	13.5	+3.2
UKIP	Raymond Northgreaves	634	2.2	New
Socialist Labour	Mark King	419	1.4	New
Independent	Peter Socrates	142	0.5	New
Majority		12,643	43.5	−5.3
Turnout		29,055	51.5	−11.3
Labour hold		Swing	−2.7	

=== Elections in the 1990s ===
General election 1997: Leeds East
Party	Candidate	Votes	%	±%
Labour	George Mudie	24,151	67.5	+9.8
Conservative	John Emsley	6,685	18.7	−9.6
Liberal Democrats	Madeleine Kirk	3,689	10.3	−3.7
Referendum	Leon Parrish	1,267	3.5	New
Majority		17,466	48.8	+19.4
Turnout		35,792	62.8	−7.2
Labour hold		Swing	+9.7	

General election 1992: Leeds East
Party	Candidate	Votes	%	±%
Labour	George Mudie	24,929	57.7	+9.0
Conservative	Neil Carmichael	12,232	28.3	+1.7
Liberal Democrats	Peter Wrigley	6,040	14.0	−10.7
Majority		12,697	29.4	+7.3
Turnout		43,201	70.0	−0.2
Labour hold		Swing	+3.6	

=== Elections in the 1980s ===
General election 1987: Leeds East
Party	Candidate	Votes	%	±%
Labour	Denis Healey	20,932	48.7	+4.9
Conservative	John Sheard	11,406	26.6	−2.7
Liberal	Maggie Clay	10,630	24.7	−1.1
Majority		9,526	22.1	+7.6
Turnout		42,968	70.2	+3.9
Labour hold		Swing	+3.9	

General election 1983: Leeds East
Party	Candidate	Votes	%	±%
Labour	Denis Healey	18,450	43.8	−11.7
Conservative	Andrew Bell	12,355	29.3	−4.0
Liberal	Maggie Clay	10,884	25.8	+16.0
National Front	Andrew Brons	475	1.1	+0.2
Majority		6,095	14.5	−7.7
Turnout		42,164	66.3	−4.2
Labour hold		Swing	−3.9	

=== Elections in the 1970s ===
General election 1979: Leeds East
Party	Candidate	Votes	%	±%
Labour	Denis Healey	26,346	55.43	
Conservative	A. Carter	15,810	33.26	
Liberal	Michael Ellis	4,622	9.72	
National Front	John Rigby	445	0.94	New
Ecology	A.C. Hill	206	0.43	New
Workers Revolutionary	Barbara Slaughter	103	0.22	New
Majority		10,536	22.17	
Turnout		47,532	70.89	
Labour hold		Swing	−2.76	

General election October 1974: Leeds East
Party	Candidate	Votes	%	±%
Labour	Denis Healey	24,745	55.64	
Conservative	J.W. Dawson	12,434	27.96	
Liberal	S. Marsh	6,970	15.67	
PEOPLE	N. Russell	327	0.74	New
Majority		12,311	27.68	
Turnout		44,476	65.66	
Labour hold		Swing		

General election February 1974: Leeds East
Party	Candidate	Votes	%	±%
Labour	Denis Healey	25,550	50.60	
Conservative	Anthony Nelson	15,036	29.78	
Liberal	S. Marsh	9,906	19.62	New
Majority		10,514	20.82	
Turnout		50,492	75.26	
Labour hold		Swing		

General election 1970: Leeds East
Party	Candidate	Votes	%	±%
Labour	Denis Healey	28,827	57.14	
Conservative	Patrick Crotty	21,112	41.85	
Communist	Joan Bellamy	513	1.02	New
Majority		7,715	15.29	
Turnout		50,452	65.87	
Labour hold		Swing		

=== Elections in the 1960s ===
General election 1966: Leeds East
Party	Candidate	Votes	%	±%
Labour	Denis Healey	30,073	61.54	
Conservative	Anthony Richard M Graham	18,796	38.46	
Majority		11,277	23.08	
Turnout		48,869	72.73	
Labour hold		Swing		

General election 1964: Leeds East
Party	Candidate	Votes	%	±%
Labour	Denis Healey	29,480	57.86	
Conservative	John A Fawcett	21,474	42.14	
Majority		8,006	15.72	
Turnout		50,954	76.11	
Labour hold		Swing		

=== Elections in the 1950s ===
General election 1959: Leeds East
Party	Candidate	Votes	%	±%
Labour	Denis Healey	28,707	54.55	
Conservative	John A Fawcett	23,922	45.45	
Majority		4,785	9.10	
Turnout		52,629	79.65	
Labour hold		Swing		

General election 1955: Leeds East
Party	Candidate	Votes	%	±%
Labour	Denis Healey	26,083	55.23	
Conservative	Cyril Donald Chapman	21,144	44.77	
Majority		4,939	10.46	
Turnout		47,227	76.24	
Labour hold		Swing		

=== Elections in the 1910s ===
General election December 1910: Leeds East
Party	Candidate	Votes	%	±%
Labour	James O'Grady	4,028	68.0	−2.0
Conservative	W.H. Clarke	1,892	32.0	+2.0
Majority		2,136	36.0	−4.0
Turnout		5,920	62.9	−18.6
Registered electors		9,419		
Labour hold		Swing	−2.0	

General election January 1910: Leeds East
Party	Candidate	Votes	%	±%
Labour	James O'Grady	5,373	70.0	+3.9
Conservative	W.H. Clarke	2,308	30.0	−3.9
Majority		3,065	40.0	+7.8
Turnout		7,681	81.5	+12.9
Registered electors		9,419		
Labour hold		Swing	+3.9	

=== Elections in the 1900s ===
General election 1906: Leeds East
Party	Candidate	Votes	%	±%
Labour Repr. Cmte.	James O'Grady	4,299	66.1	+46.0
Conservative	Henry Cautley	2,208	33.9	−20.8
Majority		2,091	32.2	N/A
Turnout		6,507	68.6	+1.1
Registered electors		9,490		
Labour Repr. Cmte. gain from Conservative		Swing	+33.4	

General election 1900: Leeds East
Party	Candidate	Votes	%	±%
Conservative	Henry Cautley	3,453	54.7	+9.8
Liberal	J. R. Maguire	1,586	25.2	−29.9
Labour Repr. Cmte.	William Byles	1,266	20.1	New
Majority		1,867	29.5	N/A
Turnout		6,305	67.5	−9.9
Registered electors		9,336		
Conservative gain from Liberal		Swing	+19.9	

=== Elections in the 1890s ===
General election 1895: Leeds East
Party	Candidate	Votes	%	±%
Liberal	Thomas Leuty	3,857	55.1	−0.6
Conservative	John Danvers Power	3,147	44.9	+0.6
Majority		710	10.2	−1.2
Turnout		7,004	77.4	−1.7
Registered electors		9,044		
Liberal hold		Swing	−0.6	

Thomas Leuty, Member of Parliament for Leeds East (1895–1900)

By-election, 30 Apr 1895: Leeds East
Party	Candidate	Votes	%	±%
Liberal	Thomas Leuty	3,999	58.2	+2.5
Conservative	John Danvers Power	2,868	41.8	−2.5
Majority		1,131	16.4	+5.0
Turnout		6,867	75.9	−3.2
Registered electors		9,044		
Liberal hold		Swing	+2.5	

General election 1892: Leeds East
Party	Candidate	Votes	%	±%
Liberal	John Gane	4,024	55.7	−2.5
Conservative	Arthur Henry Aylmer Morton	3,197	44.3	+2.5
Majority		827	11.4	−5.0
Turnout		7,221	79.1	+2.7
Registered electors		9,134		
Liberal hold		Swing	−2.5	

=== Elections in the 1880s ===
General election 1886: Leeds East
Party	Candidate	Votes	%	±%
Liberal	John Gane	3,930	58.2	+10.5
Conservative	Richard Dawson	2,820	41.8	−10.5
Majority		1,110	16.4	N/A
Turnout		6,750	76.4	−6.9
Registered electors		8,831		
Liberal gain from Conservative		Swing	+10.5	

General election 1885: Leeds East
Party	Candidate	Votes	%	±%
Conservative	Richard Dawson	3,849	52.3	
Liberal	John Gane	3,504	47.7	
Majority		345	4.6	
Turnout		7,353	83.3	
Registered electors		8,831		
Conservative win (new seat)				

== See also ==
- List of parliamentary constituencies in West Yorkshire
- List of parliamentary constituencies in the Yorkshire and the Humber (region)

== Notes ==
Parliament of the United Kingdom
Preceded by Altrincham and Sale	Constituency represented by the chancellor of the Exchequer; 1974–1979	Succeeded by Surrey East
