= John Dyne =

John Dyne may refer to:

- John Dyne (MP for Hythe) (died 1413)
- John Dyne (MP for East Grinstead) (fl. 1383–1414)
- John Bradley Dyne, headmaster of Highgate School
