= William Nelond =

English politician

William Nelond (fl. 1388) of East Grinstead, Sussex, was an English politician.

He married a woman named Joan and they may have had two sons. His dates of birth and death are unknown.

He was a Member (MP) of the Parliament of England for East Grinstead in September 1388.
