= John Ermyte =

English politician

John Ermyte (fl. 1416) was an English politician. He sat as MP for East Grinstead in March 1416.

It is possible that he was the John Ermyte who obtained a royal letter of exchange for 12 marks in November 1424.
