= Richard Ford (East Grinstead MP) =

English politician (1758–1806)

Sir Richard Ford (1758 – 3 May 1806) was an English politician who sat in the House of Commons from 1789 to 1791.

Ford was elected as a Member of Parliament (MP) for the borough of East Grinstead in Sussex at an unopposed by-election in February 1789. He held that seat until the general election in 1790, when he was returned unopposed for the borough of Appleby in Westmorland.

He served less than a year as an MP for Appleby, until he resigned from the Commons in early 1791 by accepting the post of Steward of East Hendred. (The by-election for his successor was held in May 1791.)

After serving the Undersecretary of State at the Home Office, Richard Ford was for many years chief police magistrate of London, for which services he was knighted. Ford lived for some years with actress Dorothea Jordan, who had three children by him, one of whom died. She left him when his promises of marriage to her were not fulfilled; his father wished him not to marry her. Ford later married Benjamin Booth's daughter, an heiress. His eldest son from this marriage – also named Richard Ford – was known for his art collection and his travel writings about Spain.

Parliament of Great Britain
Preceded by Robert Cuninghame; George Medley	Member of Parliament for East Grinstead; 1789–1790; With: George Medley	Succeeded by Nathaniel Dance; William Hamilton Nisbet
Preceded by Richard Penn; John Leveson-Gower	Member of Parliament for Appleby; 1790–1791; With: Robert Banks Jenkinson to Dec 1790; William Grimston from Dec 1790	Succeeded by John Rawdon; William Grimston
