= William Kingswell =

William Kingswell was MP for Petersfield from 1601 to 1614.

Parliament of Great Britain
| Preceded by Walter Covert | Member of Parliament for Petersfield; 1601–1614; With: Thomas Hanbury; John Swynnerton; William Hervey | Succeeded by Walter Savage |
