= Thomas Hanbury (MP) =

English politician (c.1572–1617)

Thomas Hanbury (c. 1572–1617) was Member of Parliament for Petersfield from 1597 to 1601.

Hanbury was the son of Thomas Hanbury of Buriton, Auditor of the Exchequer and his wife Blanche née Bowyer. He was educated at Hart Hall, Oxford. He bought the Letters Patent for Petersfield in 1599.

== Bibliography ==
- 'Petersfield Through Time', Jeffrey, D. : Stroud, Gloucestershire; Amberley Publishing; 2013 ISBN 9781445608570
- 'Report of the case of the borough of Petersfield in the County of Southampton, tried and determined by two select committees of the House of Commons in 1820/21': London; Thomas Davison; 1821

Parliament of Great Britain
Preceded by Richard Weston	Member of Parliament for Petersfield; 1597–1601; With: William Kingswell	Succeeded by John Swynnerton
