= Thomas Alleyn (MP) =

English politician

Thomas Alleyn (fl. 1383–1413) was an English politician. He sat as MP for East Grinstead in 1393 and May 1413.

He also served as bailiff of East Grinstead from Michaelmas 1394 till 1396.

By 1383, he had married a woman called Agnes.
