= Lena Jeger, Baroness Jeger =

British Labour MP (1915–2007)

The Right Honourable The Baroness Jeger

Chair of the Labour Party
- In office 5 October 1979 – 3 October 1980
- Leader: James Callaghan
- Preceded by: Frank Allaun
- Succeeded by: Alec Kitson

Member of the House of Lords
- Lord Temporal
- Life peerage 11 July 1979 – 26 February 2007

Member of Parliament for Holborn and St Pancras South
- In office 15 October 1964 – 7 April 1979
- Preceded by: Geoffrey Johnson-Smith
- Succeeded by: Frank Dobson
- In office 19 November 1953 – 18 September 1959
- Preceded by: Santo Jeger
- Succeeded by: Geoffrey Johnson-Smith

Personal details
- Born: Lena May Chivers; 19 November 1915 Wood Green, Middlesex, England
- Died: 26 February 2007 (aged 91) Haywards Heath, West Sussex, England
- Party: Labour
- Spouse: Santo Jeger (m. 1948; died 1953)
- Education: Birkbeck College, University of London

Lena May Jeger, Baroness Jeger (née Chivers; 19 November 1915 – 26 February 2007) was a British politician who held office as a Labour MP during two periods. She followed her husband as Member of Parliament for Holborn and St Pancras South, holding the seat from 1953 to 1959, then from 1964 until 1979, when she became a life peer.

== Early life ==
She was born Lena May Chivers in Wood Green, Middlesex. Her father was a postman. She was educated at Southgate County School in north London, and read English and French at Birkbeck College, University of London. She was vice-president of the National Union of Students. She joined the civil service in 1936, initially in HM Customs & Excise.

During the Second World War she worked at the Ministry of Information and the Foreign Office. A fluent Russian speaker, she edited the British Ally, a newspaper published by the British government in the Soviet Union.

She also worked at the British Embassy in Moscow. In 1948, she married Dr Santo Jeger, a general practitioner by profession, who had been Member of Parliament for St Pancras South East since the 1945 general election. She left the civil service in 1949, and worked for The Manchester Guardian from 1951 to 1954.

== Political career ==
Jeger was elected to the St. Pancras Borough Council (1945–59) and the London County Council (1952–55), on which she represented Holborn and St Pancras South. Her husband died in 1953, and she was selected as Labour's candidate in the resultant by-election in Holborn and St Pancras South. She won the by-election, held on her birthday, by 1,976 votes, slightly increasing the Labour majority. She retained her seat at the 1955 general election by 931 votes, but lost the seat to the Conservative Party in the 1959 general election by 656 votes, losing to Geoffrey Johnson-Smith.

After a period working for The Guardian, she regained her seat in the 1964 general election. The seat was renamed Camden, Holborn and St Pancras South in 1974, and she retained it until the 1979 general election – at which, despite the Conservative election victory, her seat was retained for Labour by Frank Dobson.

Jeger served on the Labour Party's National Executive Committee from 1968 until 1980, becoming chair in 1979. Following her retirement from the House of Commons she was created a life peer as Baroness Jeger, of St Pancras in Greater London, on 11 July 1979. In the House of Lords, she served as opposition spokesman on health, and then on social security.

She was chairman of the party in 1979 to 1980, and was the first peer to take the chair at the Labour party conference, at Blackpool in September 1980. She continued to write occasional pieces for The Guardian from 1964 to 2003, particularly obituaries.

Frank Dobson said of her career, "She pursued causes which may have become fashionable now, but were highly controversial when she espoused them." Jeger believed that MPs should "give a lead to public opinion and not always follow it."

== Death ==
Lena Jeger suffered from poor health in her last years. She was treated at the Royal Marsden Hospital for cancer, and was granted a leave of absence from the House of Lords. She died from breast cancer at a nursing home in Haywards Heath, aged 91, on 26 February 2007. She had no children.

Parliament of the United Kingdom
Preceded by Santo Jeger	Member of Parliament for Holborn and St Pancras South; 1953–1959	Succeeded by Geoffrey Johnson-Smith
Preceded by Geoffrey Johnson-Smith	Member of Parliament for Holborn and St Pancras South; 1964–1979	Succeeded by Frank Dobson
Political offices
Preceded by Frank Allaun	Chair of The Labour Party; 1979–1980	Succeeded by Alec Kitson
