= Robert Goodwin (Parliamentarian) =

English politician

Sir Robert Goodwin (c. 1601 – buried 29 March 1681) was an English politician who sat in the House of Commons at various times between 1626 and 1659. He supported the Parliamentary cause in the English Civil War.

== Biography ==
Goodwin was the son of Edward Goodwin of Horne, Surrey and his wife Susan Wallop, daughter of Richard Wallop of Bugbrooke, Northamptonshire. He was the brother of John Goodwin.

In 1626, Goodwin was elected member of parliament for East Grinstead. He was re-elected MP for East Grinstead in 1628 and sat until 1629 when King Charles decided to rule without parliament for eleven years.

In April 1640, Goodwin was re-elected MP for East Grinstead in the Short Parliament. He was re-elected MP for East Grinstead for the Long Parliament in November 1640. In October 1642 he was sent by the House of Commons with Robert Reynolds to Dublin as commissioner representing the parliament. They were allowed to be present at meetings of the Irish privy council with the connivance of the lords justices, and they tried to make a party for parliament among officers and officials. However they returned to England in 1643.

He remained in the Rump Parliament after Pride's Purge. He was knighted in Dublin on 3 May 1658. In 1659 he was re-elected MP for East Grinstead in the Third Protectorate Parliament. In 1659, he was one of five commissioners appointed to govern Ireland.

He died in 1681 and was buried at East Grinstead.

== Notes ==
Parliament of England
Preceded by Robert Heath; Sir Henry Compton	Member of Parliament for East Grinstead; 1626–1629; With: Sir Henry Compton	Parliament suspended until 1640
Vacant Parliament suspended since 1629	Member of Parliament for East Grinstead; 1640–1653; With: Sir Henry Compton 1640; Lord Buckhurst 1640–1644; Robert Pickering 1645; John Baker 1645–1653	Not represented in Barebones Parliament
Preceded by John Goodwin	Member of Parliament for East Grinstead; 1659; With: George Courthope	Succeeded by George Courthope; Sir Marmaduke Gresham, 1st Baronet
