= Holborn and St Pancras South (UK Parliament constituency) =

Parliamentary constituency in the United Kingdom, 1950–1983

- Former borough constituency for the House of Commons
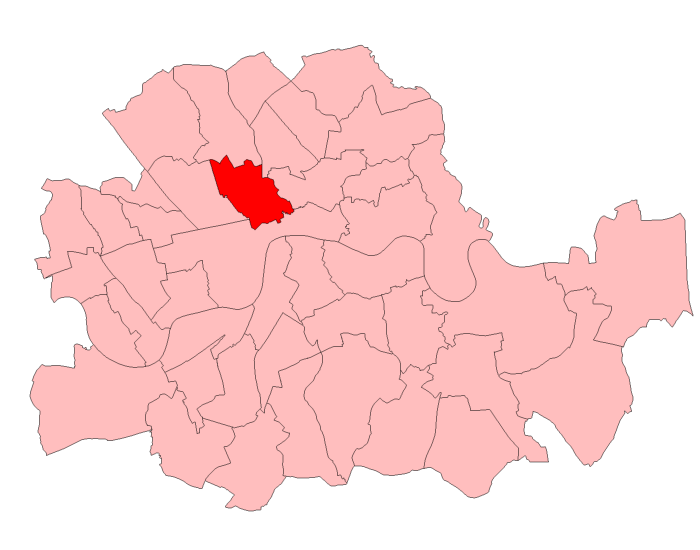
- Holborn & St Pancras South in London 1950–1974
- County: 1950–1965: County of London; 1965–1983: Greater London

1950–1983
- Seats: One
- Created from: Holborn, St Pancras South East and St Pancras South West
- Replaced by: Holborn & St Pancras

Holborn and St Pancras South was a parliamentary constituency centred on the Holborn district of Central London. It returned one Member of Parliament (MP) to the House of Commons of the Parliament of the United Kingdom, elected by the first-past-the-post voting system.

The constituency was created for the 1950 general election, and abolished for the 1983 general election, when it was largely replaced by the new constituency of Holborn and St Pancras.

== Boundaries ==
A map showing the wards of St Pancras Metropolitan Borough as they appeared in 1916.

1950–1974: The Metropolitan Borough of Holborn, and wards five, six, seven and eight of the Metropolitan Borough of St Pancras.

1974–1983: The London Borough of Camden wards of Bloomsbury, Euston, Holborn, King's Cross, Regent's Park, and St Pancras.

== Members of Parliament ==
Election	Member	Party
1950	Santo Jeger	Labour
1953 by-election	Lena Jeger	Labour
1959	Geoffrey Johnson-Smith	Conservative
1964	Lena Jeger	Labour
1979	Frank Dobson	Labour
1983	constituency abolished: see Holborn and St Pancras	

== Election results ==
=== Elections in the 1950s ===
General election 1950: Holborn and St. Pancras South
Party	Candidate	Votes	%	±%
Labour	Santo Jeger	19,223	48.51	
Conservative	Peter John Feilding Chapman-Walker	17,993	45.41	
Liberal	Hilda Buckmaster	2,411	6.08	
Majority		1,230	3.10	
Turnout		39,627	72.10	
Labour win (new seat)				

General election 1951: Holborn and St. Pancras South
Party	Candidate	Votes	%	±%
Labour	Santo Jeger	20,332	50.18	
Conservative	Louis Gluckstein	18,573	45.84	
Liberal	Isaac Joseph Hyam	1,616	3.99	
Majority		1,759	4.34	
Turnout		40,521	73.70	
Labour hold		Swing		

1953 Holborn and St Pancras South by-election
Party	Candidate	Votes	%	±%
Labour	Lena Jeger	15,784	52.11	+1.93
Conservative	William Timothy Donovan	13,808	45.59	−0.25
Liberal	Isaac Joseph Hyam	695	2.29	−1.70
Majority		1,976	6.52	+2.18
Turnout		30,287		
Labour hold		Swing		

General election 1955: Holborn and St. Pancras South
Party	Candidate	Votes	%	±%
Labour	Lena Jeger	17,126	49.62	
Conservative	William Timothy Donovan	16,195	46.92	
Liberal	Isaac Joseph Hyam	1,193	3.46	
Majority		931	2.70	
Turnout		34,514	67.30	
Labour hold		Swing		

General election 1959: Holborn and St. Pancras South
Party	Candidate	Votes	%	±%
Conservative	Geoffrey Johnson-Smith	17,065	50.98	
Labour	Lena Jeger	16,409	49.02	
Majority		656	1.96	N/A
Turnout		33,474	69.01	
Conservative gain from Labour		Swing		

=== Elections in the 1960s ===
General election 1964: Holborn and St. Pancras South
Party	Candidate	Votes	%	±%
Labour	Lena Jeger	15,873	54.33	
Conservative	Geoffrey Johnson-Smith	13,117	44.90	
Independent	Ali Mohammad Bongo Abbas	226	0.77	New
Majority		2,756	9.43	N/A
Turnout		29,216	67.52	
Labour gain from Conservative		Swing		

General election 1966: Holborn and St. Pancras South
Party	Candidate	Votes	%	±%
Labour	Lena Jeger	16,128	59.49	
Conservative	Julian Michael Edmund Byng	10,982	40.51	
Majority		5,146	19.98	
Turnout		27,110	65.54	
Labour hold		Swing		

=== Elections in the 1970s ===
General election 1970: Holborn and St. Pancras South
Party	Candidate	Votes	%	±%
Labour	Lena Jeger	12,448	55.15	
Conservative	Julian Michael Edmund Byng	10,125	44.85	
Majority		2,323	10.30	
Turnout		22,573		
Labour hold		Swing		

General election February 1974: Holborn and St. Pancras South
Party	Candidate	Votes	%	±%
Labour	Lena Jeger	12,414	49.31	
Conservative	Robert Frederick James Parsons	8,223	32.54	
Liberal	Thomas Hibbert	4,632	18.33	New
Majority		4,191	16.77	
Turnout		25,269	64.81	
Labour hold		Swing		

General election October 1974: Holborn and St. Pancras South
Party	Candidate	Votes	%	±%
Labour	Lena Jeger	11,790	55.94	
Conservative	Robert Frederick James Parsons	6,349	30.12	
Liberal	Frederick Michael John Lee	2,938	13.94	
Majority		5,441	25.82	
Turnout		21,077	53.81	
Labour hold		Swing	+4.6	

General election 1979: Holborn and St. Pancras South
Party	Candidate	Votes	%	±%
Labour	Frank Dobson	12,026	49.31	
Conservative	Robert Key	9,703	39.79	
Liberal	Thomas Hibbert	2,190	8.98	
National Front	Frank Theobald	334	1.37	New
Workers Revolutionary	Peter Farrell	134	0.55	New
Majority		2,323	9.52	
Turnout		12,361	60.40	
Labour hold		Swing		
