= Borde Hill Garden =

Coordinates: 51°01′19″N 0°06′46″W

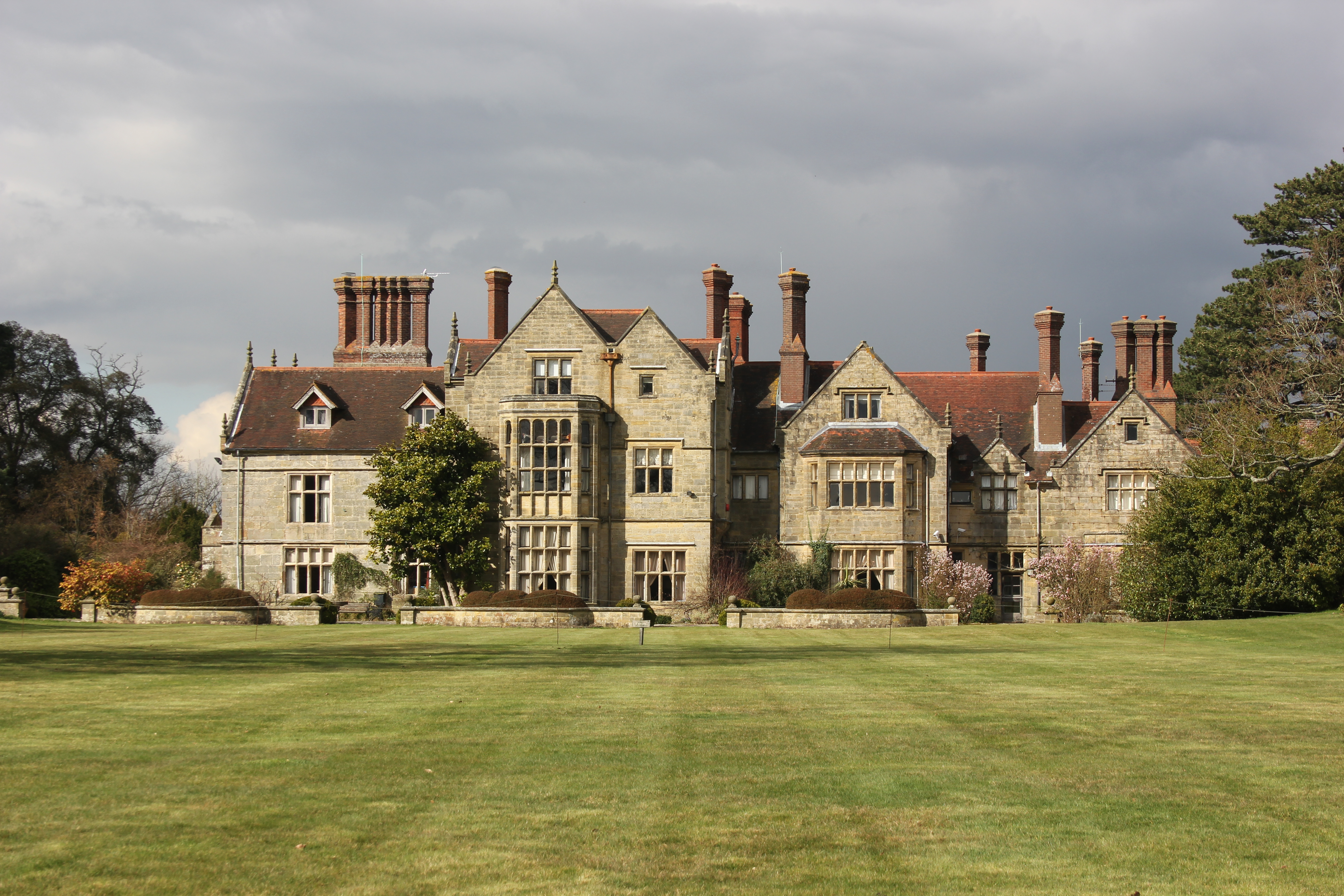
Borde Hill House, closeup from rear garden, Mar 2012

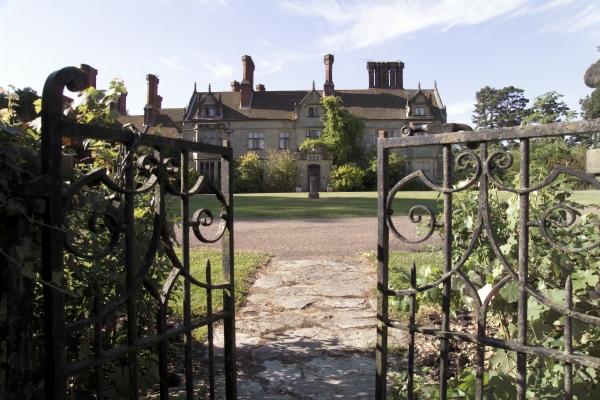
Borde Hill House

Borde Hill Garden is a garden located 1.5 miles (2.4 km) north of Haywards Heath, West Sussex in southern England. It is set in over 200 acres (80 ha) of garden, park and woodlands which has views across the Sussex High Weald.

Borde Hill Garden is planted in “living garden rooms”, each offering a different character and style. It is home to many rare shrubs: from camellias, rhododendrons, azaleas and magnolias to roses, as well as numerous trees including one of the largest collections of champion trees in a private property in Britain (82 specimens as of 2013).

== History ==
The first record of the estate dates back to 1534. The Tudor Borde Hill house was originally constructed in 1598 by Stephen Borde. After a variety of ownerships, Borde Hill was acquired by Colonel Stephenson Robert Clarke in 1893, who was the first owner to plant the gardens and woodlands. A number of extensions were made to the garden and house, however it was not until 1965 that Borde Hill Garden became a registered charity and opened to the public, by Stephenson's son Sir Ralph Clarke.

The garden is listed on the register of parks and gardens as Grade II* importance by English Heritage.
