= William Hamilton Nisbet =

British politician

William Hamilton Nisbet (1747 – 17 July 1822) was a British politician.

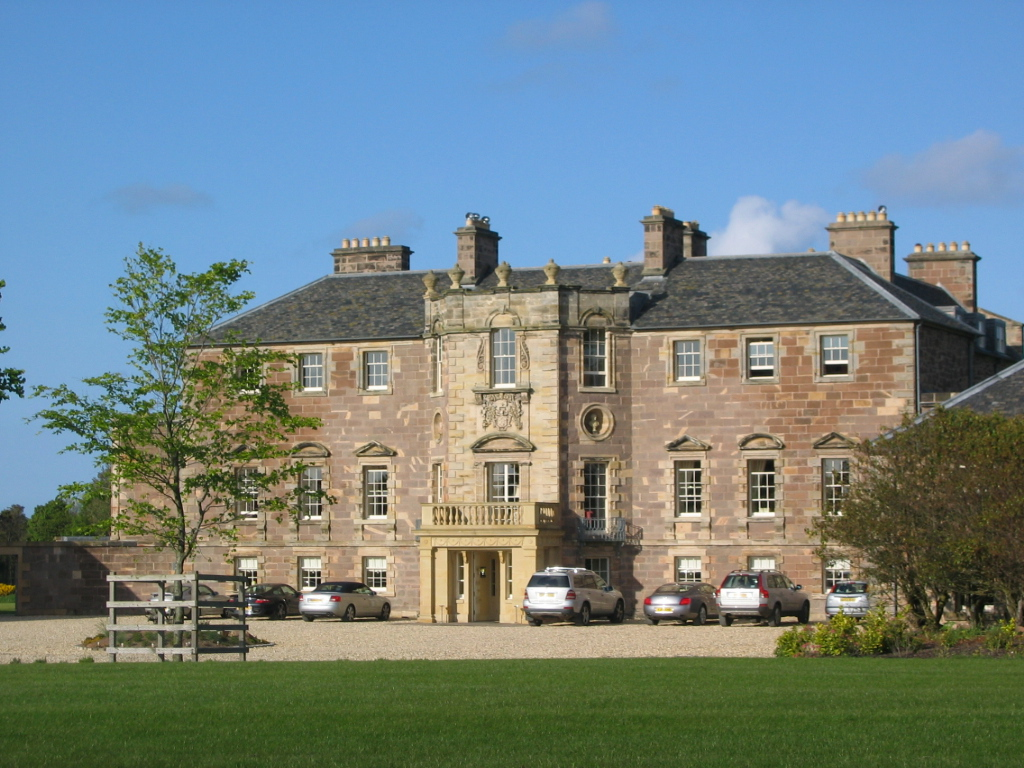
Archerfield House, Dirleton, East Lothian

He was the eldest son of William Nisbet of Archerfield House, Dirleton and his wife Mary, the daughter and heiress of Alexander Hamilton of Pencaitland, Haddington and Dechmont Linlithgow, and also the heiress of James, 5th Lord Belhaven to the estates of Biel and Presmennan. He was educated at Eton School.

He served in the British Army, initially as a cornet and then as sub-lieutenant in the Grenadier Guards, retiring in 1774. He was very well to do from his own and his wife's inheritances and entered Parliament in 1777 as the member for Haddingtonshire, sitting until 1780. Ten years later he entered Parliament again as the MP for East Grinstead (1790–96) and Newport, Isle of Wight (1796–1800).

On 31 January 1777, he married Mary Manners, daughter of Lord Robert Manners. They had one child, Mary Nisbet (bef. 1784–1855), who married Thomas Bruce, 7th Earl of Elgin on 11 March 1799, divorcing in 1808.

== Notes ==
Parliament of Great Britain
Preceded by Sir George Suttie	Member of Parliament for Haddingtonshire; 1777–1780	Succeeded by Hew Dalrymple
Preceded by George Medley; Richard Ford	Member of Parliament for East Grinstead; 1790–1796; With: Nathaniel Dance	Succeeded by Nathaniel Dance; James Strange
Preceded by Jervoise Clarke Jervoise; Edward Rushworth	Member of Parliament for Newport; 1796–1800; With: Andrew Strahan	Succeeded by Andrew Strahan; Sir George Dallas, Bt
