= Evelyn Emmet, Baroness Emmet of Amberley =

British Conservative politician (1899-1980)

The Right Honourable The Baroness Emmet of Amberley DL
- Formal portrait, 1958

Member of Parliament for East Grinstead
- In office 26 May 1955 – 3 February 1965
- Preceded by: Ralph Clarke
- Succeeded by: Geoffrey Johnson-Smith

Personal details
- Born: Evelyn Violet Elizabeth Rodd; 18 March 1899 Cairo, Egypt
- Died: 10 October 1980 (aged 81) Amberley, England
- Party: Conservative
- Spouse: Thomas Addis Emmet (m. 1923; died 1934)
- Children: 4
- Parent(s): Rennell Rodd, 1st Baron Rennell; Lilias Georgina Guthrie
- Relatives: Crispin Money-Coutts, 9th Baron Latymer (grandson)
- Education: St Margaret's School, Bushey
- Alma mater: Lady Margaret Hall, Oxford

Evelyn Violet Elizabeth Emmet, Baroness Emmet of Amberley DL (née Rodd; 18 March 1899 – 10 October 1980) was a British Conservative Party politician. She was the Member of Parliament for East Grinstead from 1955 to 1965, when she was elevated to the House of Lords.

== Early life ==
Emmet was the daughter of Lilias Georgina (Guthrie) and the diplomat Rennell Rodd, 1st Baron Rennell. She was born in Cairo, where her father was working at the time. Among her siblings were Francis Rodd, 2nd Baron Rennell (who married the Hon. Mary Constance Vivian Smith), Hon. Gloria Rodd (wife of painter Simon Elwes), Hon. Peter Rodd (who married Nancy Mitford, one of the famous Mitford sisters), and Hon. Gustaf Rodd (who married Yvonne Mary Marling, daughter of diplomat Sir Charles Murray Marling).

She was educated at St Margaret's School, Bushey and at Lady Margaret Hall, Oxford.

=== Marriage ===
On 9 June 1923, she was married to Thomas Addis Emmet, a son of Maj. Robert Emmet (and descendant of Thomas Addis Emmet) and the former Louise Garland (daughter of James Albert Garland). Emmet was a cousin of New York philanthropist Charles Garland. They were married until his death in 1934, and had four children:

- Hon. Gloria Lavinia Eileen Emmet (1924–2012), who married Maj. Mark Winton Slane Fleming in 1950.
- Hon. Christopher Anthony Robert Emmet (1925–1996), who married Lady Miranda Mary Fitzalan-Howard, daughter of Bernard Fitzalan-Howard, 3rd Baron Howard of Glossop in 1947.
- Hon. David Alastair Rennell Emmet (born 1928), who married Sylvia Delia Knowles, daughter of Willis Knowles, in 1967.
- Hon. Penelope Ann Clare Emmet (born 1932), who married Hugo Money-Coutts, 8th Baron Latymer, son of Thomas Burdett Money-Coutts, 7th Baron Latymer.

The Emmet family owned Amberley Castle in West Sussex.

== Career ==
=== Local politics ===
She was elected to the London County Council in 1925, representing Hackney North until her defeat in 1934. Afterward, she relocated to Amberley Castle. She served on the West Sussex County Council from 1946 to 1967. Emmet was the first Chairman of the Children's Committee of West Sussex County Council and also Chairman of the Child Guidance Committees.

Emmet was a member of the Conservative Women's National Advisory Committee 1951 to 1954.

=== Parliament ===
At the 1955 general election, she was elected as Member of Parliament for East Grinstead. She held the seat until 1965, when she was elevated to a life peerage as Baroness Emmet of Amberley, of Amberley in the County of Sussex, triggering a by-election in East Grinstead. She was particularly noted for advocating women's equality across numerous contexts, including equal pay, taxation, pensions, and increasing the number of women in Parliament. She also supported the legalisation of homosexuality and the United Kingdom's membership in the European Economic Community.

In the House of Lords, she served as deputy speaker from 1968 to 1977.

Lady Emmet died at Amberley Castle on 10 October 1980, at the age of 81.

== Arms ==
Coat of arms of Evelyn Emmet, Baroness Emmet of Amberley
Escutcheon Azure a fess Ermine in chief a port between two towers Argent and in base a bull's head caboshed between two trefoils slipped. Supporters Dexter a representation of St Wilfrid in processional vestments, sinister a representation of St Richard of Chichester in mass vestments at his feet a chalice, all Proper. Motto Ad Majorem Dei Gloriam (To The Greater Glory Of God)

== See also ==
- Baron Rennell

Parliament of the United Kingdom
Preceded by Ralph Clarke	Member of Parliament for East Grinstead; 1955 – 1965	Succeeded by Geoffrey Johnson-Smith
