= 1936 East Grinstead by-election =

UK Parliamentary by-election

The 1936 East Grinstead by-election was held on 23 July 1936. The by-election was held due to the elevation to the peerage of the incumbent Conservative MP, Henry Cautley. It was won by the Conservative candidate Ralph Clarke.

East Grinstead by-election, 1936
Party	Candidate	Votes	%	±%
Conservative	Ralph Clarke	22,207	79.6	+1.2
Labour	Albert Edward Millett	5,708	20.4	−1.2
Majority		16,499	59.2	+2.4
Turnout		27,915	45.5	−15.7
Conservative hold		Swing	+1.2	
