= John Gane =

British politician

Member of Parliament for Leeds East
- In office 1 July 1886 – 13 July 1895
- Preceded by: Richard Dawson
- Succeeded by: Thomas Leuty

Personal details
- Born: 1837
- Died: 1895 (aged 57–58)
- Party: Liberal

John Lawrence Gane (1837–1895) was a British Liberal Party politician who served as the Member of Parliament for Leeds East from 1886 to 1895.
