= Wealden (constituency) =

UK Parliament constituency (1983–2024)

Coordinates: 50.999°N 0.212°E

- Former county constituency for the House of Commons
- Boundary of Wealden in East Sussex

- Location of East Sussex within England
- County: East Sussex
- Electorate: 82,998 (December 2019)
- Major settlements: Crowborough, Uckfield

1983–2024
- Created from: East Grinstead, Lewes and Rye
- Replaced by: Sussex Weald

Wealden was a constituency (Note: A county constituency (for the purposes of election expenses and type of returning officer)) in East Sussex in the House of Commons of the UK Parliament. It was represented by members of the Conservative Party since its creation in 1983. Its final MP from 2015 to 2024, Nus Ghani, is the first Muslim woman to be elected as a Conservative member of Parliament.

Further to the completion of the 2023 Periodic Review of Westminster constituencies, the seat was renamed Sussex Weald, Subject to boundary changes - including losing the town of Uckfield to the newly created constituency of East Grinstead and Uckfield, and gaining the smaller town of Heathfield in part compensation. The new seat was first contested at the 2024 general election.

== History ==
This seat was created in the third periodic review of constituencies in 1983, from a mixture of the previous Mid and Northern divisions of East Sussex (also known as Lewes and East Grinstead).

Political history

The seat's history is that of a safe Conservative seat. Before the 2015 election, the Liberal Democrats, including their two predecessor parties, were represented by the main opposition candidate, but they then fell to fourth place. The best result for the Labour Party was in 2017, though it was 39% below the winning vote share.

Prominent frontbenchers

Locally born Charles Hendry served as a Minister of State in the Department of Energy and Climate Change from 2010 to 2012 following two years in the shadow role in opposition.

== Boundaries ==
Map of boundaries 2010–2024

1983–1997: The District of Wealden wards of Buxted, Chiddingly and East Hoathly, Crowborough East, Crowborough North, Crowborough West, Danehill, Fletching, Forest Row, Framfield, Frant, Hailsham Central and North, Hailsham East, Hailsham South and West, Hartfield, Heathfield, Hellingly, Horam, Maresfield, Mayfield, Rotherfield, Uckfield, Wadhurst, Waldron, and Withyam.

1997–2010: The District of Wealden wards of Buxted, Chiddingly and East Hoathly, Crowborough East, Crowborough North, Crowborough St John's, Crowborough West, Danehill, Fletching, Forest Row, Framfield, Frant, Hailsham Central and North, Hailsham East, Hailsham South and West, Hartfield, Heathfield, Hellingly, Horam, Maresfield, Mayfield, Rotherfield, Uckfield, Wadhurst, Waldron, and Withyam.

2010–2024: The District of Wealden wards of Buxted and Maresfield, Chiddingly and East Hoathly, Crowborough East, Crowborough Jarvis Brook, Crowborough North, Crowborough St John's, Crowborough West, Danehill/Fletching/Nutley, Forest Row, Framfield, Frant/Withyham, Hailsham Central and North, Hailsham East, Hailsham South and West, Hartfield, Hellingly, Horam, Mayfield, Rotherfield, Uckfield Central, Uckfield New Town, Uckfield North, Uckfield Ridgewood, and Wadhurst.

The constituency covered much of the Wealden district of East Sussex. However, some of the district in the south fell into the constituencies of Lewes, Bexhill and Battle and Eastbourne.

== Constituency profile ==
Approximately half of the population in the constituency lived in the area's three main towns: Crowborough, Hailsham and Uckfield. The rest of the seat was predominantly rural and has many small towns, villages and hamlets. The Wealden landscape is varied, ranging from the Ashdown Forest in the north to the South Downs and the coastal part is included in seats to the south.

A considerable portion of the population is retired or work in London, Brighton or other regional employment bases at a managerial or advanced professional level. Electoral Calculus describes the seat as "Strong Right" characterised by retired, socially conservative voters who strongly supported Brexit.

== Members of Parliament ==
Election	Member	Party
1983	Sir Geoffrey Johnson-Smith	Conservative
2001	Charles Hendry	Conservative
2015	Nus Ghani	Conservative

== Elections ==
=== Elections in the 2010s ===
General election 2019: Wealden
Party	Candidate	Votes	%	±%
Conservative	Nus Ghani	37,043	60.8	−0.4
Liberal Democrats	Chris Bowers	11,388	18.7	+8.3
Labour	Angela Smith	9,377	15.4	−6.8
Green	Georgia Taylor	3,099	5.1	+1.9
Majority		25,655	42.1	+3.1
Turnout		60,907	73.3	−1.0
Conservative hold		Swing	-4.4	

General election 2017: Wealden
Party	Candidate	Votes	%	±%
Conservative	Nus Ghani	37,027	61.2	+4.2
Labour	Angela Smith	13,399	22.2	+11.4
Liberal Democrats	Chris Bowers	6,281	10.4	+1.3
Green	Colin Stocks	1,959	3.2	−3.2
UKIP	Nicola Burton	1,798	3.0	−13.7
Majority		23,628	39.0	−1.3
Turnout		60,464	74.3	+3.3
Conservative hold		Swing	-3.6	

General election 2015: Wealden
Party	Candidate	Votes	%	±%
Conservative	Nus Ghani	32,508	57.0	+0.4
UKIP	Peter Griffiths	9,541	16.7	+10.7
Labour	Solomon Curtis	6,165	10.8	+1.2
Liberal Democrats	Giles Goodall	5,180	9.1	−15.8
Green	Mark Smith	3,623	6.4	+3.9
Majority		22,967	40.3	+9.0
Turnout		57,017	71.0	−0.8
Conservative hold		Swing	−5.8	

General election 2010: Wealden
Party	Candidate	Votes	%	±%
Conservative	Charles Hendry	31,090	56.6	+6.1
Liberal Democrats	Chris Bowers	13,911	25.3	+0.6
Labour	Lorna Blackmore	5,266	9.6	−7.1
UKIP	Dan Docker	3,319	6.0	+2.2
Green	David Jonas	1,383	2.5	−1.8
Majority		17,179	31.3	+2.7
Turnout		54,969	71.8	+5.5
Conservative hold		Swing	+2.8	

=== Elections in the 2000s ===
General election 2005: Wealden
Party	Candidate	Votes	%	±%
Conservative	Charles Hendry	28,975	52.1	+2.3
Liberal Democrats	Christopher Wigley	13,054	23.5	−0.2
Labour	Dudley Rose	9,360	16.8	−3.5
Green	Julian Salmon	2,150	3.9	+1.5
UKIP	Keith Riddle	2,114	3.8	+0.9
Majority		15,921	28.6	+2.5
Turnout		55,653	67.7	+4.2
Conservative hold		Swing	+1.3	

General election 2001: Wealden
Party	Candidate	Votes	%	±%
Conservative	Charles Hendry	26,279	49.8	0.0
Liberal Democrats	Steve Murphy	12,507	23.7	−2.0
Labour	Kathy Fordham	10,705	20.3	+3.1
UKIP	Keith Riddle	1,538	2.9	+2.0
Green	Julian Salmon	1,273	2.4	New
Pensioner Coalition	Cyril Thornton	453	0.9	New
Majority		13,772	26.1	+2.0
Turnout		52,755	63.5	−10.2
Conservative hold		Swing		

=== Elections in the 1990s ===
General election 1997: Wealden
Party	Candidate	Votes	%	±%
Conservative	Geoffrey Johnson-Smith	29,417	49.8	−12.0
Liberal Democrats	Michael Skinner	15,213	25.7	−1.3
Labour	Nicholas Levine	10,185	17.2	+8.0
Referendum	Barry Taplin	3,527	6.0	New
UKIP	Margaret English	569	0.9	New
Natural Law	Paul Cragg	188	0.3	0.0
Majority		14,204	24.1	−10.5
Turnout		59,099	73.7	−7.3
Conservative hold		Swing		

This constituency underwent boundary changes between the 1992 and 1997 general elections and thus change in share of vote is based on a notional calculation.

General election 1992: Wealden
Party	Candidate	Votes	%	±%
Conservative	Geoffrey Johnson-Smith	37,263	61.7	−2.5
Liberal Democrats	Michael Skinner	16,332	27.1	−0.4
Labour	Steve Billcliffe	5,579	9.2	+0.9
Green	Ian Guy-Moore	1,002	1.7	New
Natural Law	Roger Graham	182	0.3	New
Majority		20,931	34.6	−2.1
Turnout		60,358	81.0	+6.0
Conservative hold		Swing	−1.1	

=== Elections in the 1980s ===
General election 1987: Wealden
Party	Candidate	Votes	%	±%
Conservative	Geoffrey Johnson-Smith	35,154	64.2	0.0
SDP	David Sinclair	15,044	27.5	−2.1
Labour	Charles Ward	4,563	8.3	+2.1
Majority		20,110	36.7	+2.1
Turnout		54,761	75.0	+3.2
Conservative hold		Swing		

General election 1983: Wealden
Party	Candidate	Votes	%	±%
Conservative	Geoffrey Johnson-Smith	31,926	64.2	
SDP	David Pace	14,741	29.6	
Labour	Patricia Knight	3,060	6.2	
Majority		17,185	34.6	
Turnout		49,727	71.8	
Conservative win (new seat)				

== See also ==
- List of parliamentary constituencies in East Sussex

== Sources ==
- Election result, 2017 (BBC)
- Election result, 2010 (BBC)
- Election result, 2005 (BBC)
- Election results, 1997 - 2001 (BBC)
- Election results, 1997 - 2001 (Election Demon)
- Election results, 1983 - 1992 (Election Demon)
- Election results, 1992 - 2005 (Guardian)
