= Ralph Clarke (British politician) =

British politician (1892–1970)

Sir Ralph Clarke KBE TD DL

Member of Parliament for East Grinstead
- In office 1936–1955
- Preceded by: Henry Cautley
- Succeeded by: Evelyn Emmet

Personal details
- Born: Ralph Stephenson Clarke; 17 August 1892
- Died: 9 May 1970 (aged 77)
- Citizenship: United Kingdom
- Party: Conservative
- Spouse: Rebekah Mary Buxton (m. 1921)
- Children: Three

Colonel Sir Ralph Stephenson Clarke, KBE, TD, DL (17 August 1892 – 9 May 1970) was a British Conservative Party politician who served as Member of Parliament (MP) for East Grinstead from 1936 to 1955.

He was elected to the House of Commons at a by-election in July 1936, after East Grinstead's Conservative MP Henry Cautley was ennobled as Baron Cautley. Clarke held the seat until he stood down at the 1955 general election.

He was appointed as a Deputy Lieutenant (DL) of Sussex in 1932, and in the 1955 New Year Honours, he was made a Knight Commander of the Order of the British Empire (KBE), "for political and public services".

== Family ==
Clarke, the son of Colonel Stephenson Clarke, was educated at Eton and King's College, Cambridge, where he was awarded a first-class degree in natural sciences in 1913. He married Rebekah Mary Buxton and they had three children. His wife was from the Pease family of Darlington; Lucy's father was Joseph Whitwell Pease and her maternal grandfather was Alfred Fox, who created Glendurgan Garden.

The Stephenson Clarkes were the founders in 1730 of Stephenson Clarke Shipping, Britain's oldest shipping company. In 1892, Ralph Clarke's father purchased a 200-acre (0.81 km^{2}) estate at Borde Hill, near Haywards Heath in West Sussex, and from about 1912 began collecting trees and shrubs began by financing plant-collecting expeditions to the Himalayas and China. Ralph Clarke took up residence there is 1949, after the death of his father, and opened the gardens to the public in 1965.

Parliament of the United Kingdom
Preceded by Henry Cautley	Member of Parliament for East Grinstead; 1936 – 1955	Succeeded by Evelyn Emmet
