= George Medley =

British politician

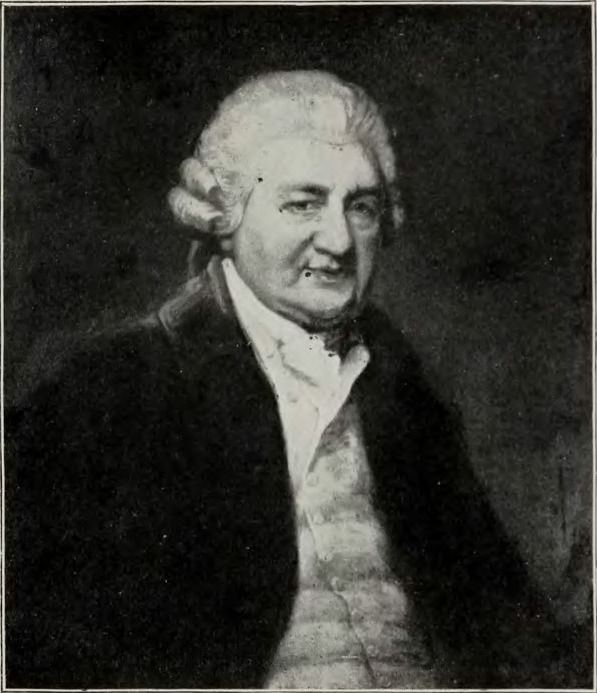
- portrait by George Romney
- Born: 6 August 1720
- Died: 1 June 1796 (aged 75)
- Occupation: Politician

George Medley (1720–1796) was a British politician who sat in the House of Commons between 1768 and 1790.

Medley was the son of Thomas Medley of Buxted Place and his wife Annabella Dashwood, daughter of Sir Samuel Dashwood MP former Lord Mayor of London and was born on 6 August. 1720. He is reported to be a descendant of Margaret Wotton, Marchioness of Dorset (1485 – 6 October 1535) through his paternal line. He is reported a descendant of Arthur Plantagenet, 1st Viscount Lisle, KG (died 3 March 1542) through his paternal line. He became a wine merchant in Portugal, where he amassed an immense property. He succeeded his brother in 1751. In 1755 he lost a part of his property as a result of the Lisbon earthquake. He subsequently returned to England and settled as a country gentleman in Sussex. He married firstly Elizabeth Jemima Palmer daughter of Sir Thomas Palmer, 4th Baronet, of Carlton on 2 June 1757 but she died soon after and was buried on 30 June 1757. He married secondly Jane Waldo, daughter of Sir Timothy Waldo of Clapham, Surrey on 8 November 1762.

Early in 1761, Medley made it clear that at the approaching general election he intended to contest Seaford against the Duke of Newcastle's interest and in February he declared himself a candidate, and began a vigorous campaign, much to Newcastle's alarm. He only entered because he felt a lack of common civility showed him, and though the Duke may have backed him he did not want to come in under obligations to anybody. He then proceeded to give the Duke a good deal of trouble in Sussex. He advertised that he would contest the Sussex county seat, asked Mad Jack Fuller to help him make an opposition at Lewes and stood at Steyning. In the 1761 general election, opposition did not press to a poll at either Sussex or Lewes, at Steyning Medley received only three votes out of about 200 but he came third at Seaford.

Medley took his attempt at Seaford seriously, and aimed to build up a lasting interest in the borough. He hoped to extend the franchise to all householders and after his defeat at the poll hoped for a favourable decision from the House of Commons. But his petition went against him, and a further effort in the law courts also failed. His position at Seaford remained strong, and in 1767 Thomas Pelham suggested to Newcastle that it would be wise to adopt Medley at the forthcoming general election. Newcastle did not want him at Seaford but was willing to return Medley for any other of his boroughs, ‘upon an assurance of his friendship and disposition to act with me in Parliament’. Medley however declared ‘that he was an independent man, with a large fortune, and wanted nothing for himself or his family, and that he would never promise anybody how he would vote in Parliament’ and made it clear that he would stand only at Seaford. Pelham persuaded Newcastle to accept Medley grudgingly on his own terms. He was elected Member of Parliament for Seaford in a contest at the 1768 general election

Medley made a few speeches in the House before the dissolution of 1774. In 1774 he was returned at Seaford after a contest, apparently again on the Pelham interest. However he was defeated at Seaford in the 1780 general election.

In a by-election in 1783, Medlet was returned as MP for East Grinstead on the Sackville interest and was returned in the 1784 general election. He is recorded as having made nine speeches in the parliament. He did not stand in 1790.

Medley died on 1 June 1796.

Parliament of Great Britain
Preceded by The Viscount Gage; James Peachey	Member of Parliament for Seaford; 1768–1780; With: The Viscount Gage	Succeeded by John Durand; John Robinson
Preceded by Henry Arthur Herbert; John Irwin	Member of Parliament for East Grinstead; 1783–1790; With: Henry Arthur Herbert 1783-1786; James Cuninghame 1786-1788; Robert Cuninghame 1788-1789; Richard Ford 1789-1790	Succeeded by Nathaniel Dance; William Hamilton Nisbet
