= John Alfray (fl. 1447–1459) =

English politician

John Alfray (fl. 1447–1459) was an English politician.

== Family ==
He was the son of John Alfray II, grandson of John Alfray I and great-grandson of another John Alfray, all of whom were MPs for East Grinstead, as was his brother, Richard Alfray.

== Career ==
He was a Member (MP) of the Parliament of England for East Grinstead four times between 1447 and 1459.
