= Edward Goodwin =

16th-century English politician

Edward Goodwin (by 1503–1548/50), of East Grinstead, Sussex, was an English politician.

== Family ==
The Goodwins were influential in the town of East Grinstead. Edward Goodwin married a woman named Margaret, and they had three sons and two daughters.

== Career ==
He was a member (MP) of the parliament of England for East Grinstead in 1529.

Parliament of England
Unknown	Member of Parliament for East Grinstead; 1529; With: William Rutter	Unknown
