= Thomas Leuty =

British politician

Thomas Leuty

Thomas Richmond Leuty (1853 – 15 April 1911), was a British Liberal Party politician.

== Background ==
Leuty was born in Leeds, the son of Thomas Leuty. He was educated at Bramham College.

== Political career ==
Leuty was Liberal candidate for the Leeds North division at the 1892 General Election. The division was a Unionist seat and he came in second. He served as Mayor of Leeds from 1893–94. He was then Liberal candidate for the Leeds East division at the 1895 General Election. This division was already a Liberal seat and he held it at the election. He served one term in parliament and stood down at the 1900 General Election. He did not stand for parliament again.

=== Electoral record ===
General election 1892: Leeds North
Party	Candidate	Votes	%	±%
Conservative	William Jackson	5,790	54.8	n/a
Liberal	Thomas Leuty	4,776	45.2	n/a
Majority		1,014	9.6	n/a
Turnout			85.9	n/a
Conservative hold		Swing	n/a	

Parliament of the United Kingdom
Preceded by John Gane	Member of Parliament for Leeds East; 1895 – 1900	Succeeded by Henry Cautley
