= Jasper Culpeper =

16th-century English politician

Jasper Culpeper (by 1508 – 1556/1564), of Penshurst, Kent and Arlington, Sussex, was an English politician.

== Family ==
His career was helped by his cousin, the courtier, Thomas Culpeper. It was not hindered when Thomas was executed for adultery with Henry VIII's fifth wife, Catherine Howard.

== Career ==
He was a member (MP) of the parliament of England for East Grinstead in 1547 and November 1554.
