= Thomas Jones (died 1711) =

Thomas Jones (died 8 October 1711) was a Member of Parliament for East Grinstead, Sussex in 1685. A son of a judge, he was a nominee of Charles Sackville, 6th Earl of Dorset in the two-member constituency, and was opposed by the Tory John Conyers. Conyers complained of the election to Parliament, in May 1685, but nothing was done with his petition.
