= East Grinstead (constituency) =

Former parliamentary constituency in the United Kingdom

- Former county constituency for the House of Commons
- County: East Sussex
- Major settlements: East Grinstead

1885–1983
- Seats: One
- Created from: East Sussex
- Replaced by: Mid Sussex and Wealden

1307–1832
- Seats: Two
- Type of constituency: Borough constituency

East Grinstead was a parliamentary constituency in the Kingdom of England, the Kingdom of Great Britain, and the United Kingdom. It first existed as a Parliamentary borough from 1307, returning two Members of Parliament to the House of Commons elected by the bloc vote system. The borough was disfranchised under the Reform Act 1832, but the name was revived at the 1885 election when the Redistribution of Seats Act created a new single-member county division of the same name.

Upon its abolition for the 1983 election, its territory was divided between Mid Sussex and Wealden.

== Boundaries ==
1885–1918: The Sessional Divisions of Cuckfield (except the parish of Crawley), East Grinstead, and Uckfield (except the parishes of East Heathley and Waldron).

1918–1950: The Urban Districts of Burgess Hill, Cuckfield, East Grinstead, Hayward's Heath, and Uckfield, and the Rural Districts of Cuckfield, East Grinstead, and Uckfield.

1950–1955: The Urban Districts of Cuckfield and East Grinstead, the Rural District of Uckfield, in the Rural District of Cuckfield the parishes of Ardingly, Balcombe, Bolney, Cuckfield Rural, Horsted Keynes, Lindfield Rural, Slaugham, West Hoathly, and Worth, and in the Rural District of Battle the parishes of Burwash, Etchingham, and Ticehurst.

1955–1974: As 1950 less the Battle RD parishes.

1974–1983: The Urban District of East Grinstead, and the Rural District of Uckfield.

== Members of Parliament ==
=== MPs 1307–1660 ===
Year	First member	Second member
1388 (Feb)	John Dyne	John Heldele
1388 (Sep)	William Nelond	Richard Woghere
1390 (Jan)		
1390 (Nov)		
1391	John Alfray I	John Dyne
1393	Thomas Alleyn	Thomas Rasse
1394		
1395	Thomas Farlegh	William atte Hull
1397 (Jan)	John Dyne	John Punget
1397 (Sep)	John Dyne	John Punget
1399	John Dyne	Richard Woghere
1401		
1402	John Dyne	Richard Woghere
1404 (Jan)		
1404 (Oct)		
1406		
1407	John Dyne	Richard Woghere
1410		
1411		
1413 (Feb)		
1413 (May)	Thomas Alleyn	John Hoke
1414 (Apr)		
1414 (Nov)	John Dyne	John Woghere
1415		
1416 (Mar)	John Ermyte	John Mason
1416 (Oct)		
1417		
1419	William Fenningham	John Hamme
1420		
1421 (May)	Richard Fowell	John Woghere
1421 (Dec)	John Alfray II	John Woghere
1433	Thomas Russell	
1447 John Alfray	1457	Ralph Legh
1459 John Alfray	1510-1523	No names known
1529	William Rutter	Edward Goodwin
1536	?	
1539	?	
1542	?	John Sackville
1545	?	
1547	Jasper Culpeper	John Sackville II, died and replaced by Jan 1552 by George Darrell
1553 (Mar)	Sir Robert Oxenbridge	George Darrell
1553 (Oct)	Sir Thomas Stradling	John Story
1554 (Apr)	Richard Whalley	Anthony Stapleton
1554 (Nov)	Thomas Duffield	
1555	?William Barnes	John Wiseman
1558	Thomas Farnham	Thomas Parker
1559	Thomas Sackville	Humphrey Llwyd
1562–3	John Sackville	Lawrence Banester
1571	John Jeffrey	Henry Berkeley
1572	Thomas Cure	Michael Heneage
1584	Thomas Cure	Francis Alford
1586	John Covert	Drew Pickesse
1589	Francis Alford	Thomas Frere
1593	Reade Stafford	John Shurley
1597	George Rivers	Richard Baker
1601	Sir Henry Compton	George Rivers
1604	Sir Henry Compton	Sir John Swynnerton
1614	Sir Henry Compton	George Rivers
1621	Sir Henry Compton	Thomas Pelham
1624	Robert Heath	Thomas Caldicot
1625	Robert Heath	Sir Henry Compton
1626	Robert Goodwin	Sir Henry Compton
1628-1629	Robert Goodwin	Sir Henry Compton
1629–1640	No Parliaments summoned	
1640 (Apr)	Sir Henry Compton	Robert Goodwin
1640 (Nov)	Lord Buckhurst, disabled 1644	Robert Goodwin
1648	Robert Goodwin	John Baker
1653	Not represented in Barebones Parliament	
1654	John Goodwin	(one seat only)
1656	John Goodwin	(one seat only)
1659	Robert Goodwin	George Courthope

=== MPs 1660–1832 ===
Year	First member	Second member
1660	Marmaduke Gresham	George Courthope
1661	Lord Buckhurst	George Courthope
1675	Edward Sackville	George Courthope
1678	Thomas Pelham	George Courthope
12 February 1679	Thomas Pelham	Edward Sackville
7 April 1679	Thomas Pelham	Henry Powle
19 April 1679	Thomas Pelham	Sir Thomas Littleton, Bt
19 August 1679	Goodwin Wharton	William Jephson
1681	Sir Cyril Wyche	Henry Powle
1685	Simon Smith	Thomas Jones
1689	Sir Thomas Dyke	Thomas Sackville
1693	Sir Thomas Dyke	Simon Smith
February 1695	Sir Thomas Dyke	The Earl of Orrery
November 1695	Sir Thomas Dyke	John Conyers
1698	The Earl of Orrery	John Conyers
January 1701	Matthew Prior	John Conyers
November 1701	The Earl of Orrery	John Conyers
1702	John Toke	John Conyers
1708	Viscount Lumley	Henry Campion
1710	John Conyers	Leonard Gale
1713	John Conyers	Hon. Spencer Compton
1715	John Conyers	The Viscount Shannon
March 1722	John Conyers	Hon. Sir Spencer Compton
November 1722	John Conyers	The Viscount Shannon
1725	Edward Conyers	The Viscount Shannon
1727	The Viscount Palmerston	The Viscount Shannon
1734	The Earl of Middlesex	Edward Conyers
1741	The Earl of Middlesex	Sir Whistler Webster
1742	John Butler	Sir Whistler Webster
1747	Sydney Smythe	Sir Whistler Webster
1751	Hon. Joseph Yorke	Sir Whistler Webster
March 1761	The Earl of Middlesex	Lord George Sackville
December 1761	The Earl of Middlesex	Sir Thomas Hales, Bt
1762	The Earl of Middlesex	John Irwin
1765	Sir Charles Farnaby	John Irwin
1767	Lord George Sackville	John Irwin
1782	Henry Arthur Herbert	John Irwin
1783	Henry Arthur Herbert	George Medley
1786	James Cuninghame	George Medley
1788	Robert Cuninghame	George Medley
1789	Richard Ford	George Medley
1790	Nathaniel Dance	William Hamilton Nisbet
1796	Nathaniel Dance	James Strange
1802	Sir Henry Strachey	Daniel Giles
1807	Sir Nathaniel Dance-Holland, Bt.	Charles Ellis
January 1812	Richard Wellesley	Charles Ellis
March 1812	George Gunning	Charles Ellis
June 1812	Nicholas Vansittart	Charles Ellis
October 1812	George Gunning	James Stephen
1815	George Gunning	Sir George Johnstone Hope
May 1818	George Gunning	Lord Strathavon
June 1818	The Hon. Charles Jenkinson	Lord Strathavon
1829	Viscount Holmesdale	Lord Strathavon
1830	Viscount Holmesdale	Frederick Richard West

- Constituency abolished (1832)

=== MPs 1885–1983 ===
- Constituency revived (1885)

Election	Name	Party	Notes
1885	George Gregory	Conservative	MP for East Sussex 1868–1885
1886	Alfred Gathorne-Hardy	Conservative	MP for Canterbury 1878–1880. Son of 1st Earl of Cranbrook
1895	George Goschen	Conservative	Governor of Madras 1924–1929; 2nd Viscount Goschen 1907–1952
1906	Charles Corbett	Liberal	
1910 (Jan)	Henry Cautley	Conservative	ennobled in 1936 as Baron Cautley, triggering a by-election
1936 by-election	Ralph Clarke	Conservative	
1955	Evelyn Emmet	Conservative	Made a life peer in 1965 as Baroness Emmet of Amberley, triggering a by-election
1965 by-election	Geoffrey Johnson-Smith	Conservative	Former broadcaster. MP for Wealden 1983–2001
1983	Constituency abolished. See Wealden and Mid Sussex		

== Elections ==
=== Elections in the 1880s ===
General election 1885: East Grinstead
Party	Candidate	Votes	%	±%
Conservative	George Gregory	3,530	57.8	
Liberal	Charles John Heald	2,579	42.2	
Majority		951	15.6	
Turnout		6,109	79.8	
Registered electors		7,660		
Conservative win (new seat)				

General election 1886: East Grinstead
Party	Candidate	Votes	%	±%
Conservative	Alfred Gathorne-Hardy	3,289	63.7	+5.9
Liberal	Charles John Heald	1,877	36.3	−5.9
Majority		1,412	27.4	+11.8
Turnout		5,166	67.4	−12.4
Registered electors		7,660		
Conservative hold		Swing	+5.9	

=== Elections in the 1890s ===
General election 1892: East Grinstead
Party	Candidate	Votes	%	±%
Conservative	Alfred Gathorne-Hardy	3,987	62.9	−0.8
Liberal	Edward George Jenkinson	2,349	37.1	+0.8
Majority		1,638	25.8	−1.6
Turnout		6,336	72.4	+5.0
Registered electors		8,754		
Conservative hold		Swing	−0.8	

George Goschen

General election 1895: East Grinstead
Party	Candidate	Votes	%	±%
Conservative	George Goschen	3,731	56.5	−6.4
Liberal	Charles Corbett	2,874	43.5	+6.4
Majority		857	13.0	−12.8
Turnout		6,605	71.3	−1.1
Registered electors		9,262		
Conservative hold		Swing	-6.4	

=== Elections in the 1900s ===
Charles Corbett

General election 1900: East Grinstead
Party	Candidate	Votes	%	±%
Conservative	George Goschen	3,890	56.4	−0.1
Liberal	Charles Corbett	3,003	43.6	+0.1
Majority		887	12.8	−0.2
Turnout		6,893	71.8	+0.5
Registered electors		9,596		
Conservative hold		Swing	−0.1	

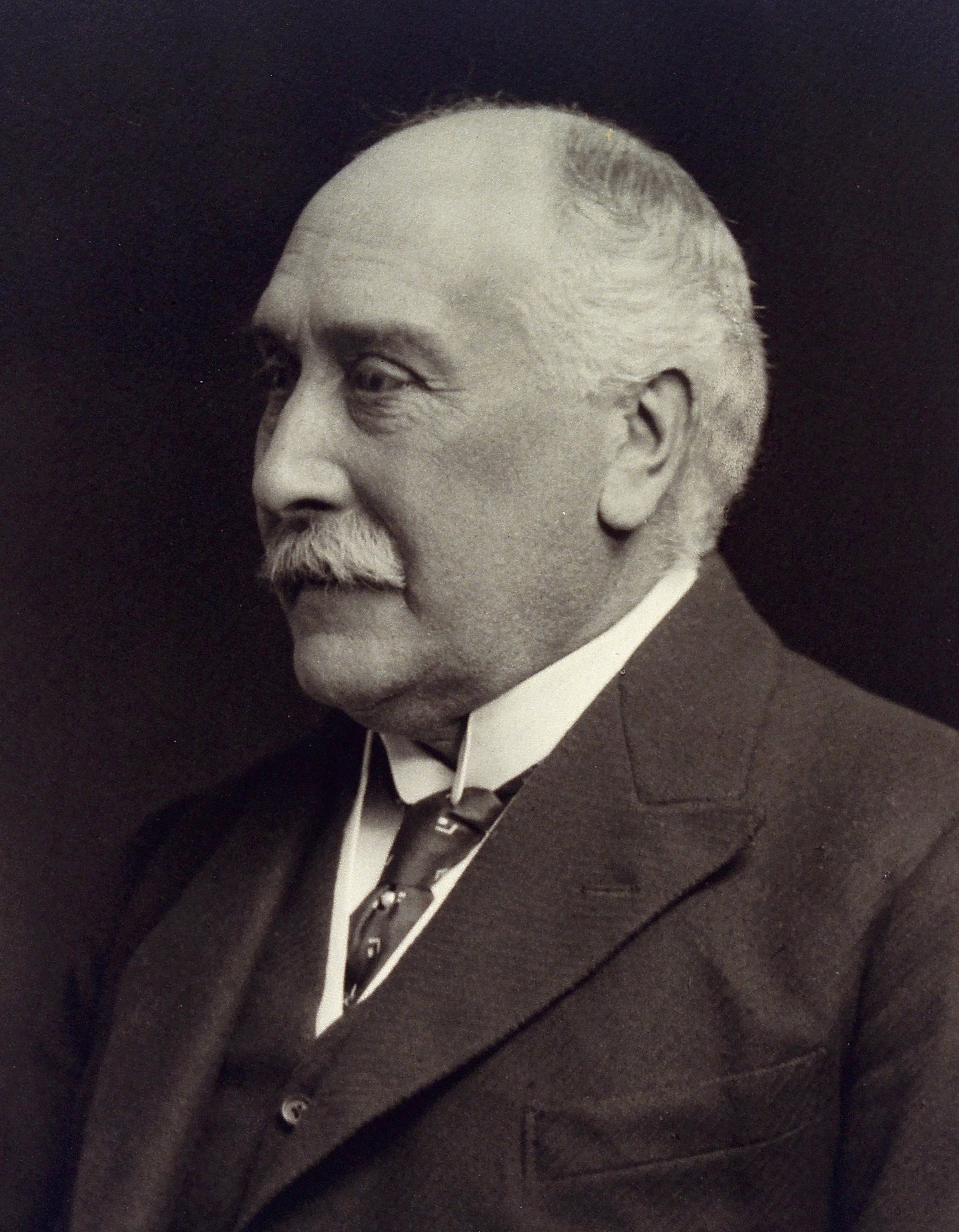
E.M. Crookshank

General election 1906: East Grinstead
Party	Candidate	Votes	%	±%
Liberal	Charles Corbett	4,793	51.4	+7.8
Conservative	Edgar Crookshank	4,531	48.6	−7.8
Majority		262	2.8	N/A
Turnout		9,324	86.9	+15.1
Registered electors		10,726		
Liberal gain from Conservative		Swing	+7.8	

=== Elections in the 1910s ===
General election January 1910: East Grinstead
Party	Candidate	Votes	%	±%
Conservative	Henry Cautley	6,563	64.2	+15.6
Liberal	Charles Corbett	3,660	35.8	−15.6
Majority		2,903	28.4	N/A
Turnout		10,223	88.4	+1.5
Registered electors		11,562		
Conservative gain from Liberal		Swing	+15.6	

General election December 1910: East Grinstead
Party	Candidate	Votes	%	±%
Conservative	Henry Cautley	5,926	62.7	−1.5
Liberal	Henry Norman Spalding	3,531	37.3	+1.5
Majority		2,395	25.4	−3.0
Turnout		9,457	81.8	−6.6
Registered electors		11,562		
Conservative hold		Swing	-1.5	

General Election 1914–15:

Another General Election was required to take place before the end of 1915. The political parties had been making preparations for an election to take place and by July 1914, the following candidates had been selected;

- Unionist: Henry Cautley
- Liberal: Richard Arthur Austen-Leigh

By-election, 1918: East Grinstead
Party	Candidate	Votes	%	±%
Unionist	Henry Cautley	Unopposed		
Unionist hold				

General election 1918: East Grinstead
Party		Candidate	Votes	%	±%
C	Unionist	Henry Cautley	12,584	67.0	+4.3
	Labour	David Pole	6,208	33.0	New
Majority			6,376	34.0	+8.6
Turnout			18,792	52.3	−29.5
Registered electors			35,955		
	Unionist hold		Swing	+4.3	
C indicates candidate endorsed by the coalition government.

=== Elections in the 1920s ===
General election 1922: East Grinstead
Party	Candidate	Votes	%	±%
Unionist	Henry Cautley	15,981	71.0	+4.0
Labour	Thomas Crawford	6,527	29.0	−4.0
Majority		9,454	42.0	+8.0
Turnout		22,508	58.2	+5.9
Registered electors		38,664		
Unionist hold		Swing	+4.0	

General election 1923: East Grinstead
Party	Candidate	Votes	%	±%
Unionist	Henry Cautley	14,215	68.8	−2.2
Labour	Thomas Crawford	6,451	31.2	+2.2
Majority		7,764	37.6	−4.4
Turnout		20,666	52.4	−5.8
Registered electors		39,405		
Unionist hold		Swing	−2.2	

General election 1924: East Grinstead
Party	Candidate	Votes	%	±%
Unionist	Henry Cautley	18,365	64.6	−4.2
Liberal	Godfrey Frerichs Mowatt	5,604	19.7	New
Labour	John Morgan	4,479	15.7	−15.5
Majority		12,761	44.9	+7.3
Turnout		28,448	70.2	+17.8
Registered electors		40,500		
Unionist hold		Swing	+5.7	

General election 1929: East Grinstead
Party	Candidate	Votes	%	±%
Unionist	Henry Cautley	21,940	57.9	−6.7
Liberal	Barbara Bliss	9,718	25.6	+5.9
Labour	Thomas Crawford	6,265	16.5	+0.8
Majority		12,222	32.3	−12.6
Turnout		37,923	68.5	−1.7
Registered electors		55,352		
Unionist hold		Swing	−6.3	

=== Elections in the 1930s ===
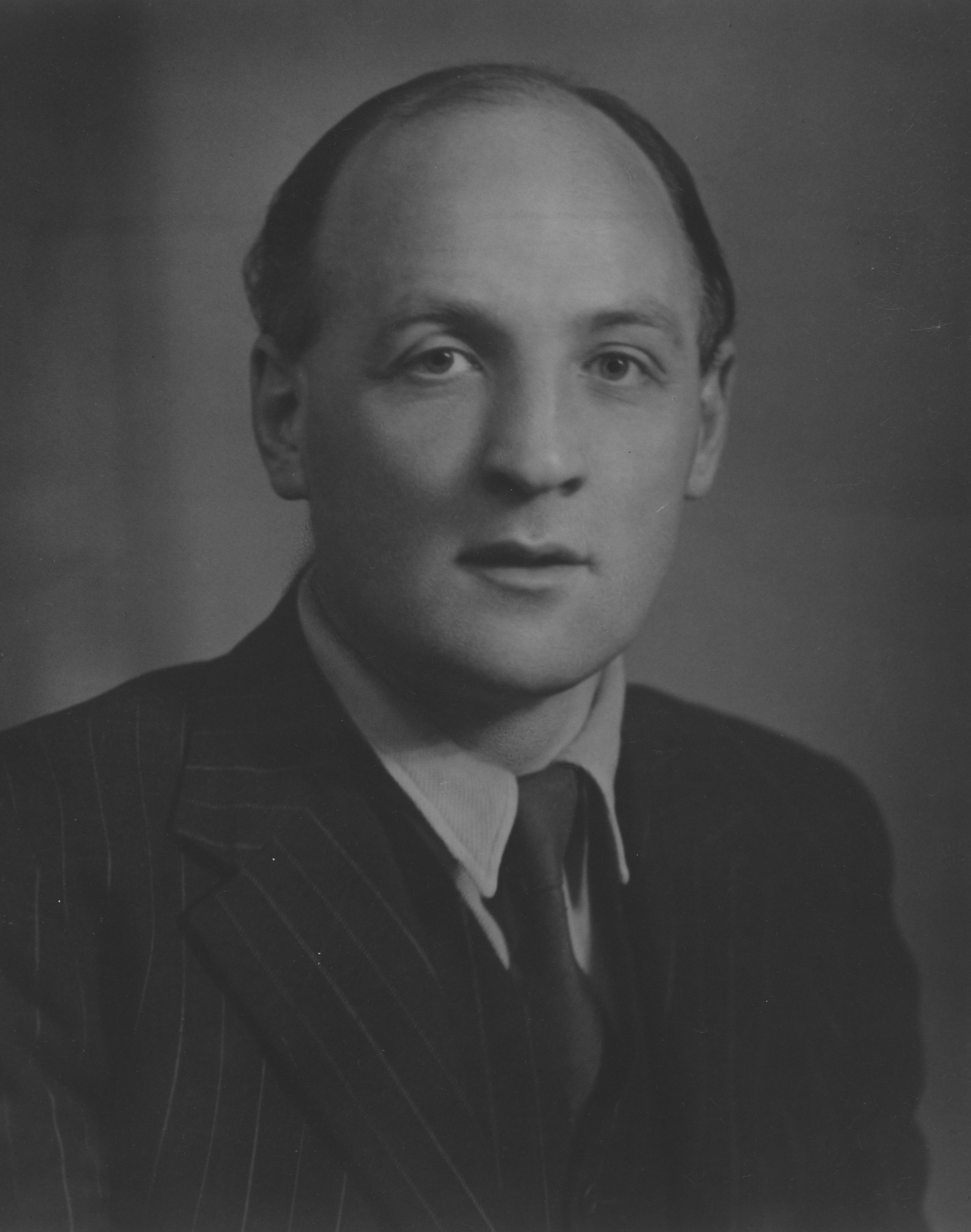
Evan Durbin

General election 1931: East Grinstead
Party	Candidate	Votes	%	±%
Conservative	Henry Cautley	34,826	87.2	+29.3
Labour	Evan Durbin	5,121	12.8	−3.7
Majority		29,705	74.4	+42.1
Turnout		39,947	69.2	+0.7
Conservative hold		Swing		

- Liberal candidate Lewis R. Jones withdrew at the last minute.

General election 1935: East Grinstead
Party	Candidate	Votes	%	±%
Conservative	Henry Cautley	29,440	78.4	−8.8
Labour	Stanislaus Seuffert	8,097	21.6	+8.8
Majority		21,343	56.8	−17.6
Turnout		37,537	61.2	−8.0
Conservative hold		Swing		

1936 East Grinstead by-election
Party	Candidate	Votes	%	±%
Conservative	Ralph Clarke	22,207	79.6	+1.2
Labour	Albert Edward Millett	5,708	20.4	−1.2
Majority		16,499	59.2	+2.4
Turnout		27,915	45.5	−15.7
Conservative hold		Swing	+1.2	

General Election 1939–40: Another General Election was required to take place before the end of 1940. The political parties had been making preparations for an election to take place and by the Autumn of 1939, the following candidates had been selected;

- Conservative: Ralph Clarke
- Liberal: William Cavendish Searle

=== Elections in the 1940s ===
General election 1945: East Grinstead
Party	Candidate	Votes	%	±%
Conservative	Ralph Clarke	28,273	57.1	−21.3
Labour	David George Packham	12,519	25.3	+3.7
Liberal	John Charles McLaughlin	8,711	17.6	New
Majority		15,754	31.8	−25.0
Turnout		49,503	70.9	+9.7
Conservative hold		Swing		

=== Elections in the 1950s ===
General election 1950: East Grinstead
Party	Candidate	Votes	%	±%
Conservative	Ralph Clarke	29,786	55.1	−2.0
Labour	Catherine Williamson	12,983	24.0	−1.3
Liberal	John Charles McLaughlin	11,329	20.9	+3.3
Majority		16,803	31.1	−0.7
Turnout		54,098	81.7	+11.8
Conservative hold		Swing		

General election 1951: East Grinstead
Party	Candidate	Votes	%	±%
Conservative	Ralph Clarke	32,803	60.3	+5.2
Labour	Herbert Atkinson	14,271	26.2	+2.2
Liberal	John Charles McLaughlin	7,375	13.5	−7.4
Majority		18,532	34.1	+3.0
Turnout		54,449	80.3	−1.4
Conservative hold		Swing		

General election 1955: East Grinstead
Party	Candidate	Votes	%	±%
Conservative	Evelyn Emmet	28,450	61.5	+1.2
Labour	Martin Mason	11,750	25.4	−0.8
Liberal	Judith St John Thornton	6,034	13.1	−0.4
Majority		16,700	36.1	+2.0
Turnout		46,234	75.1	−5.2
Conservative hold		Swing		

General election 1959: East Grinstead
Party	Candidate	Votes	%	±%
Conservative	Evelyn Emmet	31,759	62.3	+0.8
Labour	Robert William G Humphreys	10,104	19.8	−5.6
Liberal	Patrick Furnell	9,100	17.9	+4.8
Majority		21,655	42.5	+6.4
Turnout		50,963	77.9	+2.8
Conservative hold		Swing		

=== Elections in the 1960s ===
General election 1964: East Grinstead
Party	Candidate	Votes	%	±%
Conservative	Evelyn Emmet	29,094	53.2	−10.1
Liberal	Richard Holme	14,753	26.7	+8.8
Labour	William H Hill	10,859	19.8	0.0
Majority		14,341	26.5	−16.0
Turnout		54,706	78.0	+0.1
Conservative hold		Swing		

1965 East Grinstead by-election
Party	Candidate	Votes	%	±%
Conservative	Geoffrey Johnson-Smith	24,896	55.0	+1.8
Liberal	Richard Holme	14,279	31.5	+4.8
Labour	Jon Antony A Evans	6,101	13.5	−6.4
Majority		10,617	23.5	−3.0
Turnout		45,276	64.5	−13.5
Conservative hold		Swing	-1.4	

General election 1966: East Grinstead
Party	Candidate	Votes	%	±%
Conservative	Geoffrey Johnson-Smith	31,595	53.2	0.0
Liberal	James H Downie	13,611	27.0	+0.3
Labour	Arthur Harris Roberts	11,938	19.8	0.0
Majority		17,984	26.2	−0.3
Turnout		57,144	76.8	−1.2
Conservative hold		Swing		

=== Elections in the 1970s ===
General election 1970: East Grinstead
Party	Candidate	Votes	%	±%
Conservative	Geoffrey Johnson-Smith	38,359	61.2	+8.0
Liberal	David Carleton Bruce Smithers	12,343	19.7	−7.3
Labour	Tony Banks	12,014	19.2	−0.6
Majority		26,016	41.5	+15.3
Turnout		62,716	72.5	−4.3
Conservative hold		Swing		

General election February 1974: East Grinstead
Party	Candidate	Votes	%	±%
Conservative	Geoffrey Johnson-Smith	23,928	53.3	−7.9
Liberal	Peter Hasler Billenness	15,351	34.2	+14.5
Labour	William J Short	5,629	12.5	−6.7
Majority		8,577	19.1	−22.4
Turnout		44,908	81.5	+9.0
Conservative hold		Swing		

General election October 1974: East Grinstead
Party	Candidate	Votes	%	±%
Conservative	Geoffrey Johnson-Smith	22,035	53.2	−0.1
Liberal	Paul Hayden	12,755	30.8	−3.4
Labour	David William John Blake	6,648	16.0	+3.5
Majority		9,280	22.4	+3.3
Turnout		41,438	74.5	−7.0
Conservative hold		Swing		

General election 1979: East Grinstead
Party	Candidate	Votes	%	±%
Conservative	Geoffrey Johnson-Smith	28,279	62.0	+8.8
Liberal	Jeremy Nieboer	11,102	24.4	−6.4
Labour	RJ Taylor	6,196	13.6	−2.4
Majority		17,177	37.6	+15.2
Turnout		45,577	77.1	+2.6
Conservative hold		Swing		
