= Rebecca Dines =

Australian actress

Rebecca Dines is an Australian actress, best known to television viewers for her performance as Vicki McPherson during the final year (1986) of the drama series Prisoner.

== Biography ==
Dines was born in Queensland, Australia. She graduated from Queensland University with a BA in English and drama, before going to Sydney to study acting at the Q Theatre from 1980 to 1983. She moved to London in 1988, before moving to the United States in 1989, concentrating on theatre work.

Her recent work includes her critically acclaimed role as Tekla in Strindberg's Creditors at the Aurora Theatre in Berkeley, California.

In 2017, Rebecca was awarded Outstanding Actress In A Lead Role from Theatre Tampa Bay for playing Margie Walsh in Good People by David Lindsay-Abaire at American Stage Company in St. Petersburg, Florida. She has previously received Best Actress and Best Supporting Actress awards from the Bay Area Theatre Critics Circle as well as several Dramalogue awards for Performance.

She has performed in 19 productions to date, for Palo Alto–based Theatreworks, as well as appearing for the Kansas City, Berkeley, San Jose, and South Coast Repertory theatres, the Magic and B Street theatres, Capital Stage Company, American Stage Company (FL) and the Laguna Playhouse, as well as a variety of Shakespeare Festivals including Lake Tahoe, San Francisco and Sydney. She recently joined the North American touring company of Blithe Spirit starring Angela Lansbury appearing at the Ahmanson Theatre in Los Angeles, San Francisco, Toronto and DC.

== Filmography ==
Year	Title	Role	Notes
1985	The Dunera Boys	Abigail	
1986	Death of a Soldier	Jane Evans	
1986	Prisoner	Vicki McPherson	57 episodes
1987	Going Sane	Catherine	
1988	The Clean Machine	Nurse Robinson	Television film
2019	July Rising	Collette Williams	

Producer
Year	Title	Role	Notes
2020	Thunder Fit	Producer	
