= Henry Cautley, 1st Baron Cautley =

British politician and judge (1863-1946)

Henry Strother Cautley, 1st Baron Cautley KC (9 December 1863 – 21 September 1946), known as Sir Henry Cautley, Bt, from 1924 to 1936, was a British barrister, judge and Conservative politician.

== Background and education ==
Cautley was the son of Henry Cautley and his wife Mary Ellen (née Strother). He was educated at Charterhouse School and King's College, Cambridge, and was later called to the Bar, Middle Temple.

== Political and judicial career ==
He soon turned to politics and unsuccessfully contested Dewsbury in 1892 and 1895. However, in 1900 he was elected to the House of Commons as Member of Parliament (MP) for Leeds East. Cautley lost this seat in 1906 when he was defeated by James O'Grady but returned to Parliament in January 1910 as MP for East Grinstead, a seat he held until 1936. Apart from his political career he was also a Recorder of Sunderland from 1918 to 1935. He was made a King's Counsel in 1919 and created a Baronet, of Horsted Keynes in the County of Sussex, in 1924. On his retirement from the House of Commons in 1936 he was raised to the peerage as Baron Cautley, of Lindfield in the County of Sussex.

== Personal life ==
Cautley married at St. Paul's Church, Woodhouse Eaves, Leicestershire, on 1 October 1902, Alice Bohun Fox, daughter of B. H. C. Fox, JP, of Maplewell, Woodhouse Eaves; they had no children. He died in 1946, aged 82, when the baronetcy and barony became extinct.

Parliament of the United Kingdom
| Preceded by Thomas Leuty | Member of Parliament for Leeds East; 1900 – 1906 | Succeeded by James O'Grady |
| Preceded by Charles Corbett | Member of Parliament for East Grinstead; January 1910 – 1936 | Succeeded by Ralph Clarke |
Peerage of the United Kingdom
| New creation | Baron Cautley; 1936–1946 | Extinct |
Baronetage of the United Kingdom
| New creation | Baronet (of Horsted Keynes); 1924–1946 | Extinct |
