= Dine =

Dine may refer to:

== People named Dine ==
=== Surname ===
- Fiqri Dine (died 1960), Prime Minister of Albania's Quisling government under Nazi Germany and chieftain of the Dine clan from Debar
- Jim Dine (born 1935), American pop artist
- Nancy Dine (1937–2020), American filmmaker
- Spiro Dine (1846–1922), Albanian rilindas, writer and playwright; his most known work "Waves of the Sea" was at the time of its publication the longest book printed in Albanian
- S. S. Van Dine (1888–1939), American art critic and author
- Thomas Dine, chief executive officer of the Jewish Community Federation of San Francisco, the Peninsula, Marin and Sonoma Counties

=== Given name ===
- Dine Abduramanov (19th-century–1902), known as Dine Abduramana, was a Bulgarian revolutionary, a worker of the Internal Macedonian-Adrianople Revolutionary Organization (IMARO)

== Other uses ==
- Diné, name for the Navajo in the Navajo language
- Diné College, a community college serving the Navajo Indian Reservation
- Dine Brands, an American food and beverage company

== See also ==
- Dyne, a unit of force
- Dyne (name)
