= Santo Jeger =

British politician (1898–1953)

Santo Jeger MP

Member of Parliament
- In office 5 July 1945 – 24 September 1953
- Preceded by: Alfred Beit
- Succeeded by: Lena Jeger
- Constituency: St Pancras South East (1945–1950); Holborn and St Pancras South (1950–1953)

Mayor of Shoreditch
- In office 1929–1930
- Preceded by: George Reynolds
- Succeeded by: Henrietta Girling

Personal details
- Born: Santo Wayburn Jeger; 20 May 1898 London, England
- Died: 24 September 1953 (aged 55)
- Party: Labour
- Spouses: Raie Muende (m. 1924; div. 1930) Lena Chivers (m. 1948)
- Education: University College, Cardiff; London and St Mary's Hospital

Santo Wayburn Jeger (20 May 1898 – 24 September 1953) was a British Labour Party politician who served as a Member of Parliament (MP) from 1945 until his death.

Born in London, Jeger attended University College, Cardiff and the London and St Mary's Hospitals. As a doctor, Jeger was a founder of the Socialist Medical Association. He served as a councillor on Shoreditch Borough Council from 1925 and was Mayor of the Borough 1929–1930 and the Chairman of the Borough's public health committee for six years, establishing a number of clinics and public health schemes. He represented Shoreditch on the Metropolitan Boroughs Standing Joint Committee. Jeger was elected to the London County Council in 1931, serving until 1946. He was active in providing medical aid to the Republicans in the Spanish Civil War.

Jeger stood for Parliament without success in 1935 general election in St Pancras South East but won the seat at the 1945 general election. He was elected in the two subsequent elections in 1950 and 1951 for the new seat of Holborn and St Pancras South. Jeger died in 1953 at the age of 55, and his widow, Lena Jeger, succeeded him as the member of parliament in the ensuing by-election.

Parliament of the United Kingdom
Preceded by Sir Alfred Lane Beit	Member of Parliament for St Pancras South East; 1945–1950	Constituency abolished
New constituency	Member of Parliament for Holborn and St Pancras South; 1950–1953	Succeeded by Lena Jeger
