= John Woghere =

Member of the Parliament of England

John Woghere (fl. 1414–1437) of East Grinstead, Sussex, was an English politician and husbandman.

== Family ==
He was the son of Richard Woghere, also an MP for East Grinstead. Woghere married a woman named Margery. If there were children, they are unrecorded.

== Career ==
He was a Member (MP) of the Parliament of England for East Grinstead in November 1414, May 1421, December 1421, 1423, 1426 and 1437.
