= Geoffrey Johnson-Smith =

British politician (1924-2010)

The Right Honourable Sir Geoffrey Johnson-Smith DL

Member of Parliament for Wealden East Grinstead (1965–1983)
- In office 4 February 1965 – 14 May 2001
- Preceded by: Evelyn Emmet
- Succeeded by: Charles Hendry

Member of Parliament for Holborn and St Pancras South
- In office 8 October 1959 – 25 September 1964
- Preceded by: Lena Jeger
- Succeeded by: Lena Jeger

Personal details
- Born: 16 April 1924 Glasgow, Scotland
- Died: 11 August 2010 (aged 86) Sussex, England
- Party: Conservative
- Spouse: Jeanne Smith (m. 1951)
- Children: 3
- Education: Lincoln College, Oxford

Sir Geoffrey Johnson-Smith, DL (16 April 1924 – 11 August 2010) was a British Conservative politician. He was a Member of Parliament (MP) from 1959 to 2001, with only a brief interruption in the 1960s. He was also a television presenter.

== Early life and career ==
The son of an electrical engineer, he joined the Royal Artillery straight from Charterhouse School in 1942 and after the war was demobilised as a captain.

At Lincoln College, Oxford, he read PPE. Contemporaries remembered him as Oxford's best-dressed socialist, though he always insisted he never joined the Labour Party. In his final year he and Robin Day took part in a debating tour of United States run by the English-Speaking Union. From Oxford he joined the British Information Services, serving in San Francisco, where he met his wife, Jeanne, an American doctor whom he married in 1951.

He won a seat on London County Council in 1955, representing Putney, but lost it at the 1958 election.

He was later a presenter of the BBC magazine programme Tonight in the late 1950s.

== Political career ==
Shortly before the 1959 general election, Cliff Michelmore, Tonight’s presenter, had a hernia operation and Johnson-Smith was promoted to co-host the show for six weeks. His profile was thus at its highest when the election was called, and on 8 October 1959 he ousted the Labour member for Holborn and St Pancras South, Lena Jeger, by 656 votes.

He successfully promoted a bill authorising councils to operate a meals-on-wheels service for the elderly and was soon on the fast track, within six months becoming PPS to ministers at the Board of Trade; in 1962 he moved to the Ministry of Pensions and National Insurance.

His parliamentary career was interrupted in October 1964 when Lena Jeger had her revenge by 2,756 votes as Labour came to power. He briefly returned to television, freelancing for the BBC and Rediffusion’s religious programmes.

However, he returned to the House of Commons the following year at a by-election in the safe Conservative seat of East Grinstead. When that constituency was abolished for the 1983 election, he was returned for the new Wealden constituency, and held that seat until he retired at the 2001 general election, having served 41 years in Parliament.

Alec Douglas-Home quickly appointed him an Opposition whip, and when Edward Heath became leader that summer he made Johnson-Smith a party vice-chairman.

When Heath came to power in 1970 he kept Johnson-Smith at Central Office. Soon afterwards Iain Macleod died suddenly, the party Chairman Anthony Barber taking his place and Johnson-Smith becoming acting chairman. He was never in the running for the top job, despite his popularity among Conservative ladies, and in April 1971 he instead became Under-Secretary for Defence for the Army with special responsibility for the Ulster Defence Regiment.

Johnson-Smith, who was later to launch a successful campaign on behalf of haemophiliacs who had been given infected blood, fought a long battle to curb the Church of Scientology. The Church had its headquarters near East Grinstead and in 1970 he endured a six-week libel case before a jury vindicated his stance.

After the Bloody Sunday killings of January 1972, he mounted an uncompromising defence of the Parachute Regiment: "It is bad enough for our troops to have to run all the perils and be shot at by gunmen without having their pain increased by smears in this House."

In November 1972, Heath moved him sideways to the Civil Service Department, with the remit of sharpening presentation of government policy. His time there was dominated by the Kenneth Littlejohn affair, which was still rumbling on when Heath called a snap election in February 1974. Johnson-Smith fought a skilful media campaign, but could not prevent Heath losing.

When Margaret Thatcher took the leadership, she asked him to oversee media activities at Central Office alongside a fellow television professional, Gordon Reece. After her 1979 election victory he joined the 1922 Committee executive and chaired the party's backbench media committee.

From 1980 to 1996 he chaired the select committee on Member's Interests, having to field embarrassing questions about the business activities of Thatcher's son, Mark.

He served on the Board of Governors of the British Film Institute in the 1980s.

Johnson-Smith specialised increasingly in defence. From 1985 he chaired the military committee of the North Atlantic Assembly, and from 1987 to 1997 he led the British delegation. For six years he chaired the Conservative backbench defence committee.

== Later life and death ==
He was knighted in the 1982 Birthday Honours and sworn of the Privy Council in 1996. Johnson-Smith died in Sussex on 11 August 2010, aged 86.

Parliament of the United Kingdom
Preceded by Lena Jeger	Member of Parliament for Holborn and St Pancras South; 1959–1964	Succeeded by Lena Jeger
Preceded by Evelyn Emmet	Member of Parliament for East Grinstead; 1965–1983	Constituency abolished
New constituency	Member of Parliament for Wealden; 1983–2001	Succeeded by Charles Hendry
