= William Rutter (MP) =

16th-century English politician

William Rutter (by 1488 – buried October 1541), of Southwark, Surrey, was an English politician.

== Family ==
Little is known of Rutter. His wife was named Elizabeth, and her maiden name may have been Lowe. They had one son and two daughters.

== Career ==
He was a member (MP) of the parliament of England for East Grinstead in 1529.

Parliament of England
Unknown	Member of Parliament for East Grinstead; 1529; With: Edward Goodwin	Unknown
