= John Alfray (fl. 1421–1422) =

English politician

John Alfray (fl. 1421–1422) was an English politician.

== Family ==
Alfray's father, John Alfray, was MP for East Grinstead in 1391. His two sons, John and Richard, were also MPs for the town.

== Career ==
He was a Member (MP) of the Parliament of England for East Grinstead in December 1421 and 1422.
