= Thomas Duffield (MP for East Grinstead) =

English politician

Thomas Duffield (1492/93 – 1579), of East Grinstead, Sussex, was an English politician.

== Family ==
Duffield was born in East Grinstead, and lived there until his death. He married a woman named Alice, and they had two sons and at least one daughter.

== Career ==
He was a member (MP) of the parliament of England for East Grinstead in November 1554.
