= Richard Woghere =

English politician

- Born: 1378
- Died: 1407 (aged 28–29)
- Occupation: politician

Richard Woghere (fl. 1378–1407), of East Grinstead, Sussex, was an English politician.

== Family ==
His son, John Woghere, was also an MP for East Grinstead. His wife's name is unrecorded, and no other children are recorded.

== Career ==
Woghere was bailiff of East Grinstead from 1382 to 1384. He was a Member (MP) of the Parliament of England for East Grinstead in 1378, May 1382, April 1384, November 1384, 1385, September 1388, 1399, 1402 and 1407.
