= Walter Savage =

17th-century English MP

Walter Savage was MP for Petersfield from 1614 to 1621.

Parliament of Great Britain
Preceded by William Kingswell	Member of Parliament for Petersfield; 1593–1597; With: Walter Tichborne	Succeeded by John Hippisley
