= Dyn =

Dyn or DYN may refer to:

- DYN (magazine)
- Dyne (dyn), a unit of force
- Dyn (company) (Dynamic Network Services, Inc., originally known as DynDNS), an Internet performance management company
- Dynorphin, a class of opioid peptides
- Nira Dyn, Israeli mathematician
- Dynamic apnea with fins, a freediving discipline
