= George Rivers =

Sixteenth century English member of Parliament

Sir George Rivers (1553–1630) was an English politician.

He was born the son of Sir John Rivers of Chafford and Elizabeth, the daughter of Sir George Barne, and probably educated at Trinity College, Cambridge. He entered the Middle Temple in 1574.

In 1597 and 1601 he was elected Member of Parliament for East Grinstead. From 1604 to 1611 he was the MP for Southwark, London but in 1614 was again returned as the member for East Grinstead. He then served as MP for Lewes in 1625 and 1626.

He was knighted in 1605. He became the Steward of the Borough of Southwark.

He married Frances, the daughter of William Bowyer of Sussex; they had at least four sons and a daughter.
