= John Dyne (MP for East Grinstead) =

English politician

John Dyne (fl. 1383–1414) was an English politician.

He was a member (MP) of the parliament of England for East Grinstead from 1383 to 1414. Apart from this, there is no information on him; he could possibly have been a descendant of Nicholas Dyne (fl. 1352) of East Grinstead.
