= John Alfray (fl. 1391) =

English politician

John Alfray (fl. 1391) was an English politician.

== Family ==
Alfray's father, John Alfray, was MP for East Grinstead in the 1360s and his son, John, also represented the town.

== Career ==
He was a Member (MP) of the Parliament of England for East Grinstead in 1391.
