= Viscount Pevensey =

Viscount Pevensey was a noble title conferred twice:

- in Great Britain (1730–1743, subsidiary to the Earl of Wilmington)
- in Ireland (1816–1909, subsidiary to the Earl of Sheffield)
