= Richard Lumley, 2nd Earl of Scarbrough =

British Army officer and politician (1686–1740)

The Right Honourable The Earl of Scarbrough KG PC
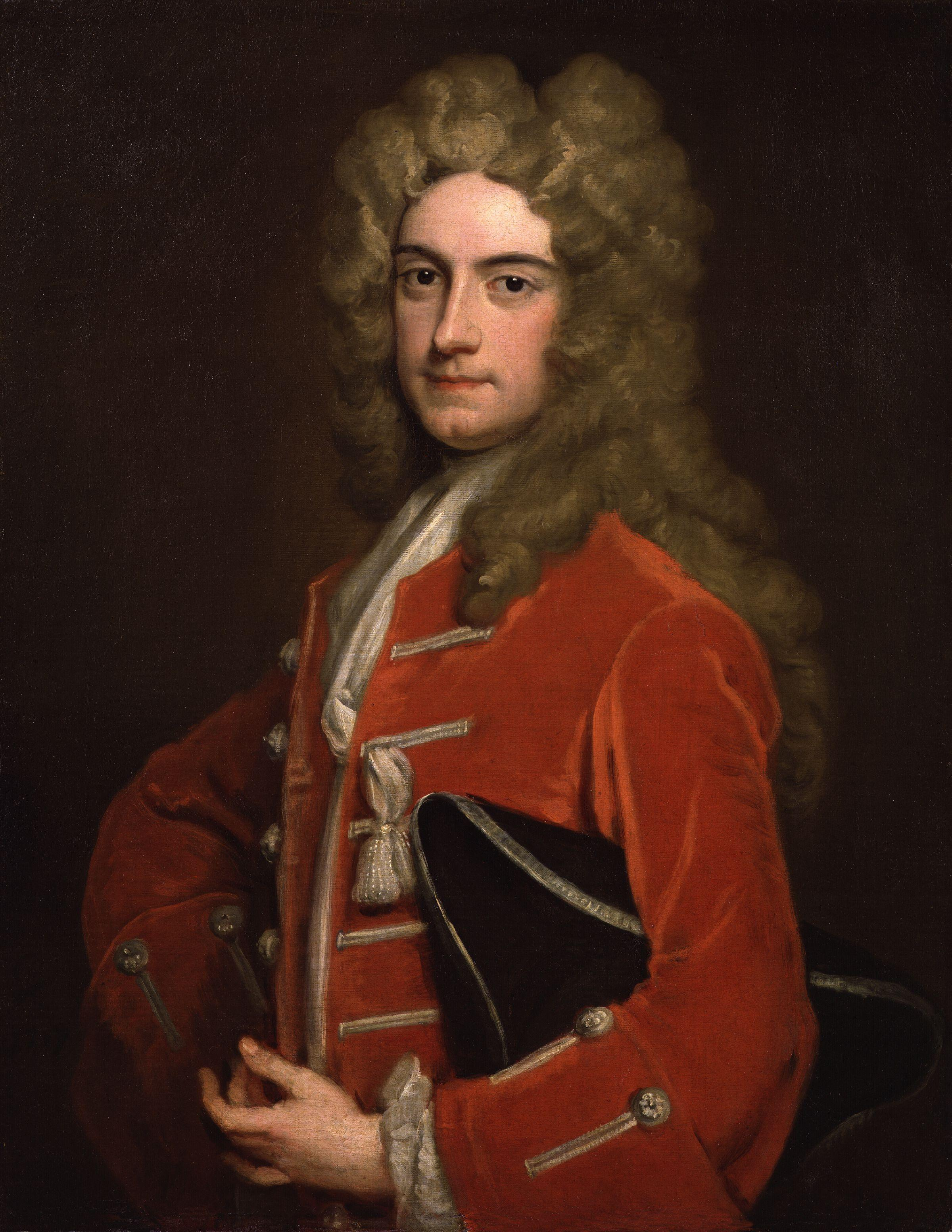
- Portrait by Sir Godfrey Kneller
- Born: 30 November 1686
- Died: 29 January 1740 (aged 53)
- Alma mater: Eton College; King's College, Cambridge
- Military career
- Allegiance: Great Britain
- Branch: British Army
- Service years: 1712–1740
- Rank: Lieutenant-general
- Conflicts: War of the Spanish Succession

Member of Parliament for East Grinstead
- In office 1708–1710 Serving with Henry Campion

Member of Parliament for Arundel
- In office 1710–1715 Serving with Henry O'Brien, 8th Earl of Thomond

Personal details
- Party: Whig

Lieutenant-General Richard Lumley, 2nd Earl of Scarbrough KG PC (30 November 1686 – 29 January 1740), styled Viscount Lumley from 1710 to 1721, was a British Army officer and Whig politician who sat in the House of Commons from 1708 until 1715 when he was raised to the House of Lords as Baron Lumley. He subsequently inherited his father's title as Earl of Scarbrough. He died of a self-inflicted gunshot at the age of 53.

== Early life ==
Lumley was the second son of Richard Lumley, 1st Earl of Scarbrough. He was educated at Eton College in about 1702 and was admitted at King's College, Cambridge in 1703.

== Career ==
At the 1708 British general election, Lumley was returned as Whig MP for East Grinstead. He supported the naturalization of the Palatines in 1709. He wished to serve in the army, and though not given a commission, he joined the Duke of Marlborough for the campaign in the spring and summer of 1709. In 1710, he voted for the impeachment of Dr Sacheverell. He succeeded his recently deceased, elder brother as MP for Arundel at the 1710 British general election. He also became vice-admiral of County Durham in 1710. He voted for the ‘No Peace Without Spain’ motion on 7 December 1711. By January 1712 he held an army commission as lieutenant-colonel of horse and became lieutenant-colonel of the 1st Dragoon Guards in 1713. He told against a Court amendment to the Address on 10 April 1713, and voted on against the French commerce bill on 18 June 1713. At the 1713 British general election he was returned again for Arundel. He was concerned about the movements of the Pretender and campaigned for his removal from Lorraine. He spoke and voted against the expulsion of Richard Steele from the House. In 1714 he was appointed Lord of the bedchamber to the Prince of Wales in September 1714 and became Master of the Horse to the Prince of Wales in November 1714.

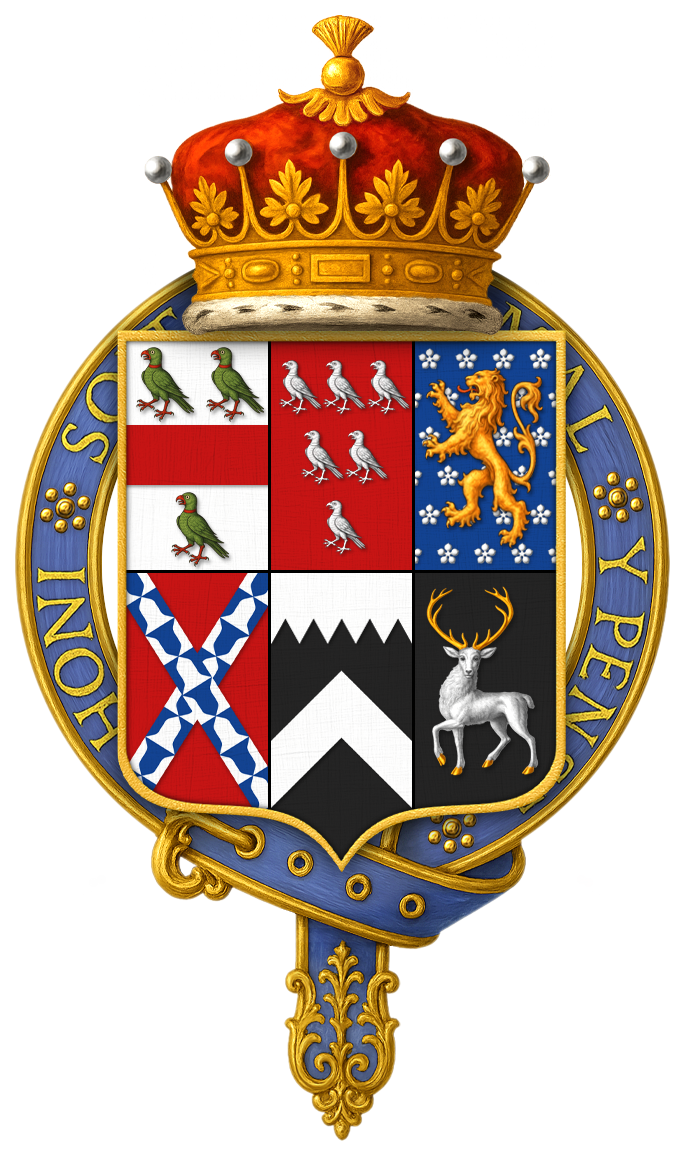
Quartered arms of Richard Lumley, 2nd Earl of Scarbrough, KG, PC

In 1715, Lumley was called to the House of Lords in his father's barony of Lumley. He became colonel and captain of the 1st Foot Guards in 1715 and fought against the Jacobites at the Battle of Preston that year. He remained a Whig supporter in the House of Lords, but in 1717 he was forced to sell his regiment for his adherence to the Prince of Wales. On 2 May 1721 he stood as proxy for Ernest, Duke of York at the baptism of William Augustus. After inheriting his father's titles in December 1721, as Lord Scarbrough, he became Lord Lieutenant of Northumberland and Colonel of the Coldstream Guards in 1722 and was made a Knight of the Garter on 9 July 1724. On the accession of King George II in 1727, he became Master of the Horse to the King and was admitted to the Privy Council on 15 June 1727. He gave up his court post in 1734 and was promoted to major-general in 1735 and lieutenant-general in 1739. In 1739, he was one of the founding governors for the Foundling Hospital in London.

== Death and legacy ==
Lord Scarbrough died by shooting himself on 29 January 1740, aged 53. At the time of his suicide, it was rumoured to have been brought on by a mental disorder he developed from a knock on the head when he had an accident in his carriage a few days before. There was also a rumour that he had killed himself because of a betrayal of trust. The rumour ran that he had confided a secret of State to the dowager Duchess of Manchester whom he had been about to marry, and that she had then told this secret to others. When word got back to the king of the source of the leak of the secret, Scarbrough killed himself.

Lord Scarbrough was buried on 4 February 1740 in the Grosvenor Chapel in South Audley Street, Mayfair. Scarbrough's titles passed to his brother, Thomas.

Parliament of Great Britain
Preceded by John Conyers; John Toke	Member of Parliament for East Grinstead; 1708–1710; With: Henry Campion	Succeeded by John Conyers; Leonard Gale
Preceded by Viscount Lumley; The Viscount Shannon	Member of Parliament for Arundel; 1710–1715; With: The Earl of Thomond	Succeeded by Henry Lumley; Thomas Micklethwait
Military offices
Preceded by Hon. George Cholmondeley	Captain and Colonel of the 1st Troop Horse Grenadier Guards; 1715–1717	Succeeded by Hon. John Fane
Preceded by The Earl Cadogan	Colonel of the Coldstream Guards; 1722–1740	Succeeded by The Duke of Cumberland
Political offices
In Commission	Master of the Horse; 1727–1734	Succeeded by The Duke of Richmond
Honorary titles
Preceded by The Earl of Scarbrough	Vice-Admiral of Durham; 1710–1740	Vacant Title next held by The Earl of Darlington
Preceded by The Earl of Scarbrough	Lord Lieutenant of Northumberland; 1722–1740	Succeeded by The Earl of Tankerville
Preceded by The Earl of Scarbrough	Custos Rotulorum of Northumberland; 1722–1740	Succeeded by The Earl of Tankerville
Peerage of England
Preceded by Richard Lumley	Earl of Scarbrough; 1721–1740	Succeeded by Thomas Lumley
Preceded by Richard Lumley	Baron Lumley (writ in acceleration); 1715–1740	Succeeded by Thomas Lumley
