= Henry Campion =

British Tory politician

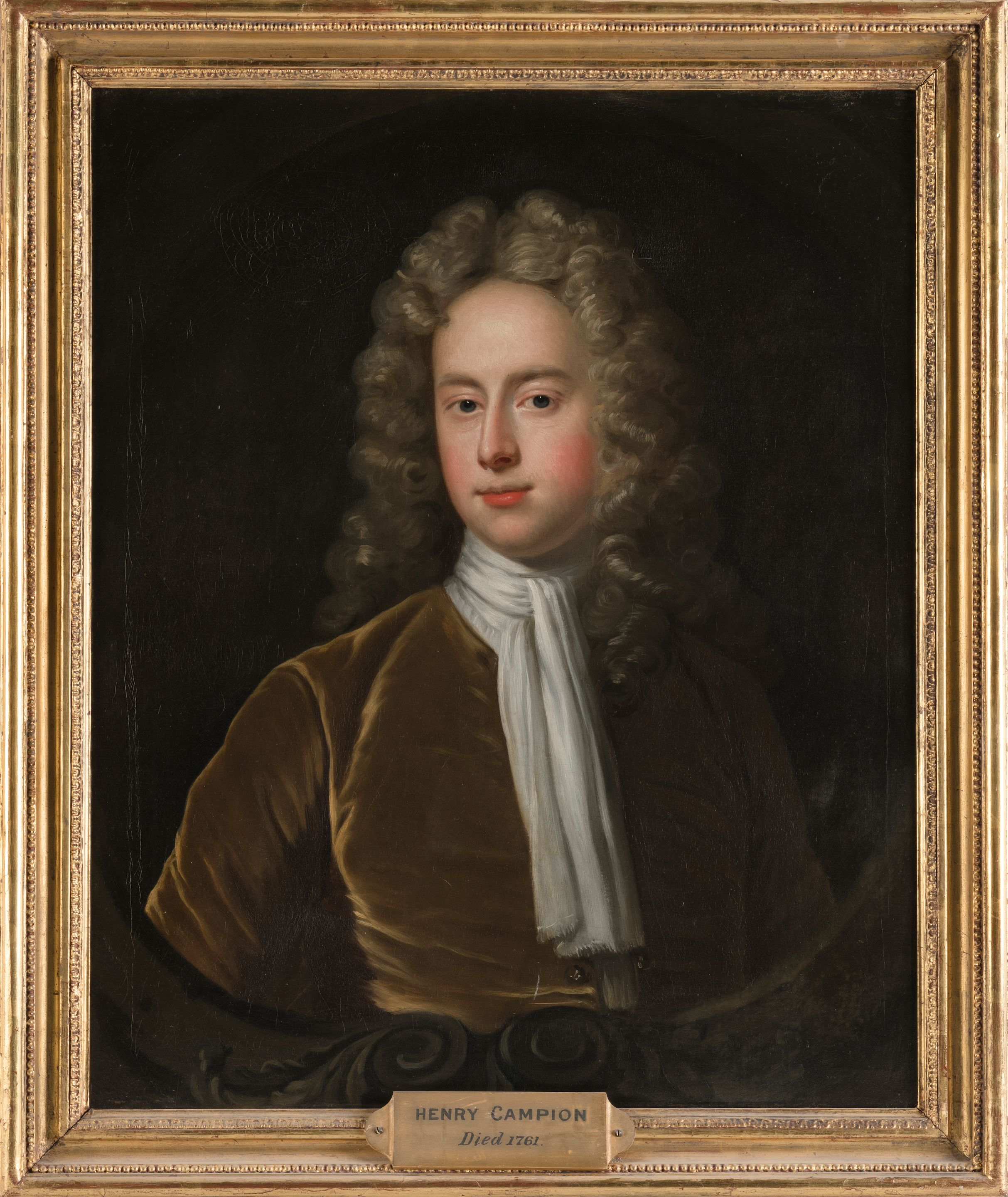
Henry Campion, painting by anonymous artist (circle of Thomas Hudson)

Henry Campion (c. 1680 – 17 April 1761), of Combwell, Goudhurst, Kent, was a British Tory politician who sat in the House of Commons from 1708 to 1715. He later became an active Jacobite.

== Early life ==
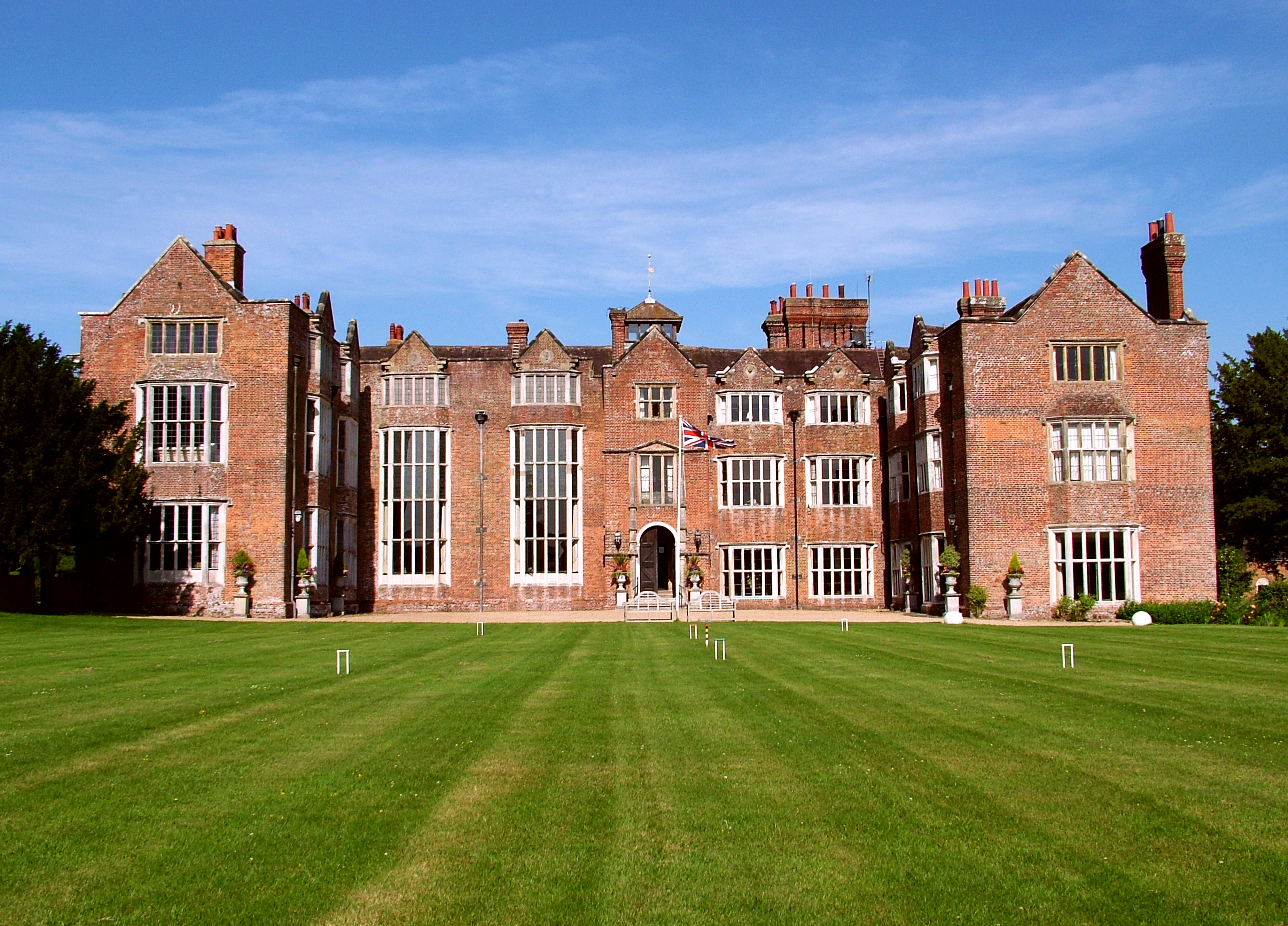
Danny Park House

Campion was the son of William Campion of Combwell, Kent, and his wife Frances Glynne, daughter of Sir John Glynne of Henley Park, Surrey. He was educated at Enfield Grammar School and was admitted at Trinity College, Cambridge on 2 December 1697. He was admitted to Lincoln's Inn in January 1698. On 8 June 1702, he married Barbara Courthope, the daughter and heiress of Peter Courthope of Danny Park, Sussex.

== Career ==
Although his father was a Whig lawyer, Campion was returned as Tory Member of Parliament for East Grinstead at the 1708 British general election. He told for the Tories several times and voted against the impeachment of Dr Sacheverell in 1710. He did not stand at the 1710 British general election, but was returned as MP for Bossiney at a by-election on 22 December 1710. He was chosen a commissioner of accounts on 9 April 1711 and was classed as one of the ‘worthy patriots’ who had detected the mismanagements of the previous administration, becoming an early member of the October Club. At the 1713 British general election he was returned as MP for Sussex in a contest and also for Helston. He chose to sit for Sussex and was highly active within the House of Commons.

After 1715 Campion became an active Jacobite and served in the Jacobite rebellion as a messenger and organizer. As a result he had to spend the next few years abroad, before returning to England in 1720. In 1725 he came into possession of Danny Park where he lived until his death.

== Death and legacy ==
Campion died on 17 April 1761 and was buried at Hurstpierpoint. He left a son, William and a daughter, Katherine, who had married a George Courthope.

Parliament of Great Britain
| Preceded by John Toke; John Conyers | Member of Parliament for East Grinstead; 1708–1710; With: Viscount Lumley | Succeeded by John Conyers; Leonard Gale |
| Preceded by Francis Robartes; John Manley | Member of Parliament for Bossiney; 1710–1713; With: John Manley | Succeeded by John Manley; Sir William Pole, Bt |
| Preceded by Charles Eversfield; Sir George Parker, Bt | Member of Parliament for Sussex; 1713–1715; With: John Fuller | Succeeded by James Butler; Hon. Spencer Compton |
| Preceded by Sidney Godolphin; Robert Child | Member of Parliament for Helston; 1713–1714; With: Charles Coxe | Succeeded by Thomas Tonkin; Alexander Pendarves |
