= Compton Place =

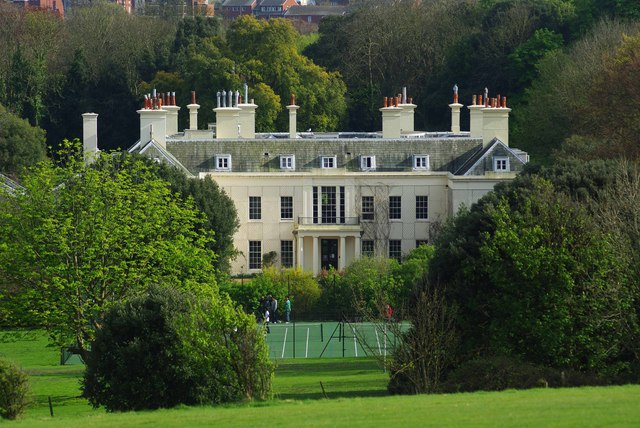

- Location within East Sussex
- 50.7645°N 0.2711°E
- Location: Compton Place Road, Eastbourne, East Sussex BN21 1EB

History
- Built for: Spencer Compton, 1st Earl of Wilmington
- Rebuilt: 1726–31

Site notes
- Area: United Kingdom
- Restored: 1800
- Restored by: Colen Campbell

Listed Building – Grade I
- Official name: Compton Place
- Designated: 27 May 1949
- Reference no.: 1353113

Compton Place is a mansion house in the parish of Eastbourne, East Sussex, England. It was rebuilt from 1726 by Sir Spencer Compton (later 1st Earl of Wilmington), to the design of the architect Colen Campbell, and was completed after Campbell's death by William Kent.

== History ==
The predecessor Elizabethan/Jacobean mansion house on the site was called East Borne or Borne Place and was the seat of Sir William Wilson, 1st Baronet (c. 1608–1685). The tenant from 1714 was Spencer Compton, Treasurer to George, Prince of Wales. In 1724 Compton liked the place well enough to purchase the house and estate outright and to rename it Compton Place; the Prince of Wales was Colen Campbell's chief patron, and it was natural for Spencer Compton to turn to him for its design.

The E-shaped plan, of which the central range had been doubled in depth in the seventeenth century, was retained. Campbell presented a plan for the south elevation, which was modified in the execution, but he was principally involved in remaking the interiors, where his presence is commemorated in the stucco portrait bust of him in the soffit of the bay window at the south end of the Gallery, which is the sole surviving contemporary image of the Scottish architect; the plasterwork is associated with the "three Germans" alluded to in the correspondence from Lord Wilmington's gardener William Stuart, one of whom is thought to have been the Anglo-Danish stuccator Charles Stanley. The London plasterer John Hughes supervised the plasterwork. Carving in the house was by the London carver John Richards.

Opening out of the south end of the Gallery are state bedroom with alcoves. Engravings of the alcove and the compartmented ceiling of the East Bedroom (later called the "Duchess's Bedroom") appear in Campbell's Five Orders. The Duke's Bedroom", "one of the most opulent examples in England", has a stucco relief following Titian's Venus and Adonis; there are smaller stucco relief panels of Paris with Helen and Diana with Endymion.

Sir Spencer was created Earl of Wilmington in 1728. At his death in 1743, Compton Place passed to his nephew the 5th Earl of Northampton. It then passed by marriage in 1759 to George Cavendish, 1st Earl of Burlington. He renovated the building in 1806. when the brick and flint exterior was faced with stucco and composition and a Doric peristyle added to the bay window. The estate passed down to his grandson 7th Duke of Devonshire, who from 1859 laid out the new town of Eastbourne on the south half of the estate. More recently the park north and east of the house has been laid out in golf courses of the Royal Eastbourne Golf Club, (founded in 1887), whose first president was William Cavendish, 7th Duke of Devonshire, and the dukes continue to be presidents; the two golf links are named for the Duke of Devonshire and his eldest son, the Marquess of Hartington.

In 1954, as part of the 11th Duke's retrenchment following the 80% death duties levied on his father's estate, the house was let to a language school, and its successor remains in residence as of 2009.

== See also ==
- Listed buildings in Eastbourne
