= Matthew Prior =

English diplomat and poet (1664–1721)

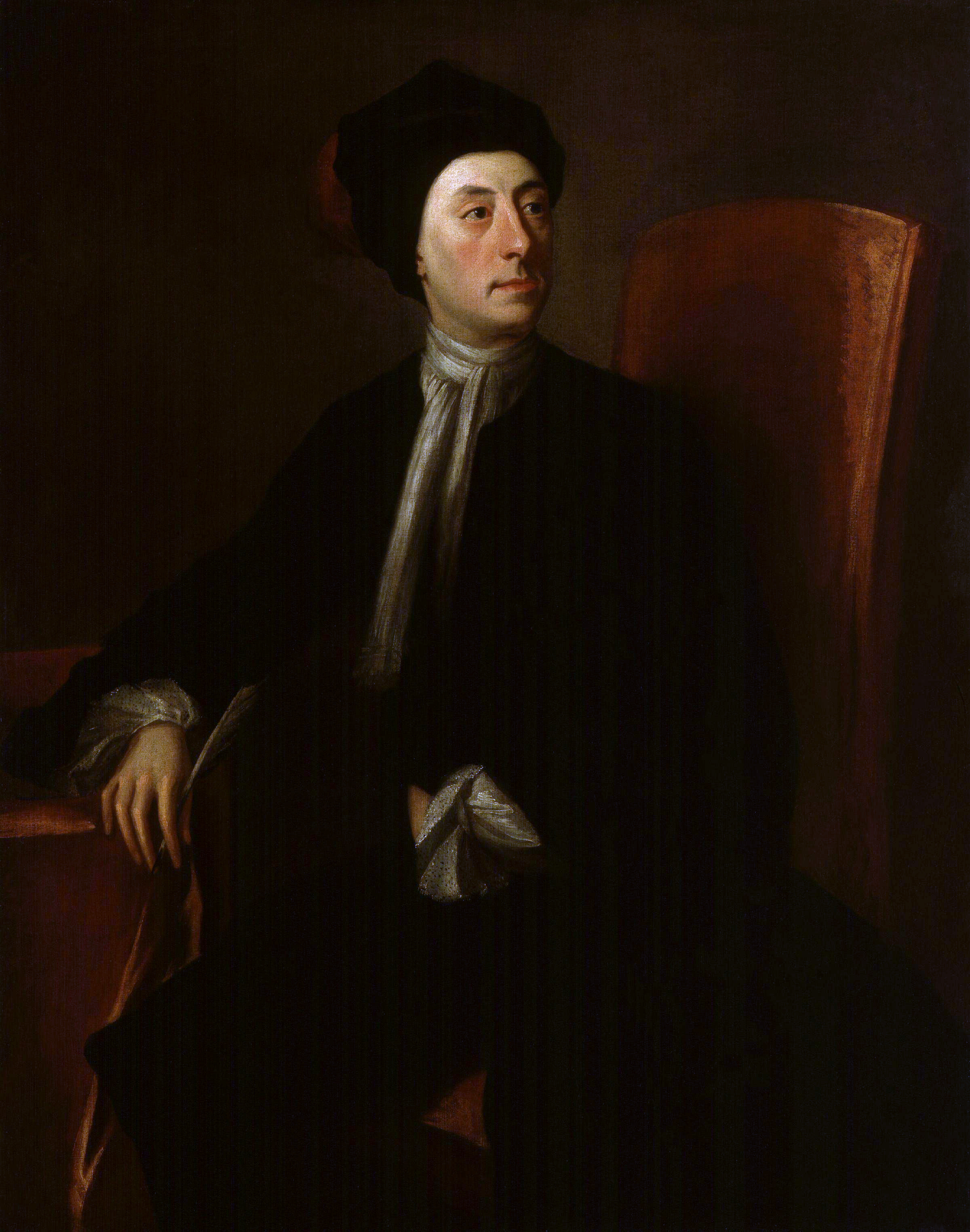
- Portrait c. 1718

Minister Plenipotentiary to France
- In office 28 November 1712 – 25 March 1715
- Appointed by: Anne
- Preceded by: Charles Townshend, 2nd Viscount Townshend
- Succeeded by: John Dalrymple, 2nd Earl of Stair

Chief Secretary for Ireland
- In office 17 May 1697 – 24 November 1699
- Monarch: William III
- Preceded by: William Palmer
- Succeeded by: Humphrey May

Member of Parliament for East Grinstead
- In office 6 February 1701 – 25 June 1701 Serving with John Conyers
- Preceded by: Lionel Boyle, 3rd Earl of Orrery; John Conyers
- Succeeded by: Lionel Boyle, 3rd Earl of Orrery; John Conyers

Commissioner for Trade and Plantations
- In office 28 June 1700 – 22 April 1707
- Appointed by: William III
- Preceded by: John Locke
- Succeeded by: John Pulteney

Secretary to the Embassy at Paris
- In office 21 January 1698 – 21 August 1699
- Appointed by: William III

Secretary to the Embassy at The Hague
- In office 1 November 1690 – 11 December 1697
- Appointed by: William III
- Preceded by: Christopher Tromer
- Succeeded by: Guillaume de Lamberty

Personal details
- Born: 21 July 1664 London, England
- Died: 18 September 1721 (aged 57) Wimpole, England
- Party: Whig (before 1701); Tory (after 1701)
- Occupation: Poet; statesman; diplomat

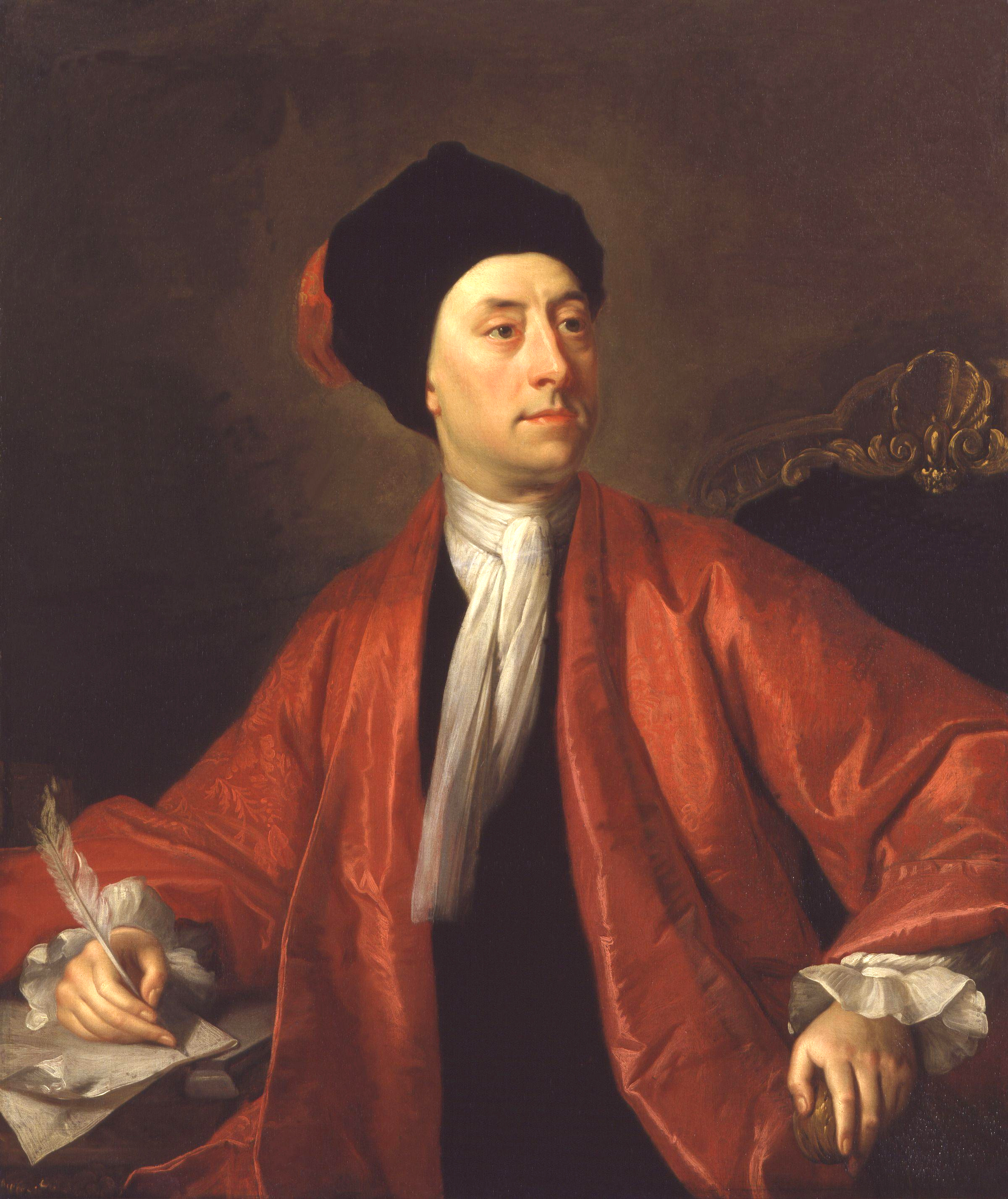
Prior by Thomas Hudson

Matthew Prior (21 July 1664 – 18 September 1721) was an English poet, statesman, and diplomat, who played a crucial role in securing the Treaties of Utrecht, serving as Minister Plenipotentiary to France from 1712 to 1715. He is also known as a contributor to The Examiner.

== Early life ==
Prior was born in Wimborne Minster, Dorset, where he lived with his father George, a Nonconformist joiner. His father moved to London, and sent him to Westminster School, under Dr Richard Busby. After his father's death, he left school, and was cared for by his uncle, a vintner in Channel Row. Here, Lord Dorset found him reading Horace, and set him to translate an ode. He did so well that the Earl offered to contribute to the continuation of his education at Westminster.

One of his schoolfellows and friends at Westminster was Charles Montagu, 1st Earl of Halifax. It was to avoid being separated from Montagu and his brother James that Prior accepted, against his patron's wish, a scholarship recently founded at St John's College, Cambridge. He took his B.A. degree in 1686, and two years later became a fellow. In collaboration with Montagu, he wrote in 1687 the City Mouse and Country Mouse, in ridicule of John Dryden's The Hind and the Panther.

He led an affair with French salonist Claudine de Tencin.

== Diplomacy and early writings ==
During an age when satirists could be sure of patronage and promotion, Montagu was promoted at once, and Prior, three years later, became secretary to the embassy at the Hague. After four years, he was appointed a Gentleman of the Bedchamber at court. Apparently, he acted as one of the King's secretaries, and in 1697 he was secretary to the plenipotentiaries who concluded the Peace of Ryswick. Prior's talent for affairs was doubted by Alexander Pope, who admittedly had little experience in diplomatic affairs, but it is not likely that King William would have employed in this important business a man who had not given proof of diplomatic skill and grasp of details.

The poet's knowledge of French was recognised by his being sent in the following year to Paris in attendance on the English ambassador. At this period Prior could say with good reason that "he had commonly business enough upon his hands, and was only a poet by accident." To verse, however, which had laid the foundation of his fortunes, he still occasionally trusted as a means of maintaining his position. His occasional poems during this period include an elegy on Queen Mary in 1695; a satirical version of Boileau's Ode sur le prise de Namur (1695); some lines on William's escape from assassination in 1696; and a brief piece called The Secretary.

After his return from France, Prior became under-secretary of state and succeeded John Locke as a commissioner of trade. In 1701 he sat in Parliament for East Grinstead. He had certainly been in William's confidence with regard to the Partition Treaty; but when Somers, Orford and Halifax were impeached for their share in it he voted on the Tory side, and immediately on Anne's accession he allied himself with Robert Harley and St John. Perhaps as a consequence of this; there is no mention of his name in connection with any public transaction for nine years. But when the Tories came into power in 1710, Prior's diplomatic abilities were again called into action, and until the death of Anne he held a prominent place in all negotiations with the French court, sometimes as secret agent, sometimes in an equivocal position as ambassador's companion and sometimes as fully accredited but very unpunctually paid ambassador. His share in negotiating the Treaty of Utrecht, of which he is said to have disapproved personally, led to its popular nickname of "Matt's Peace."

Prior is also known as a contributor to The Examiner newspaper.

== Imprisonment and poetry ==
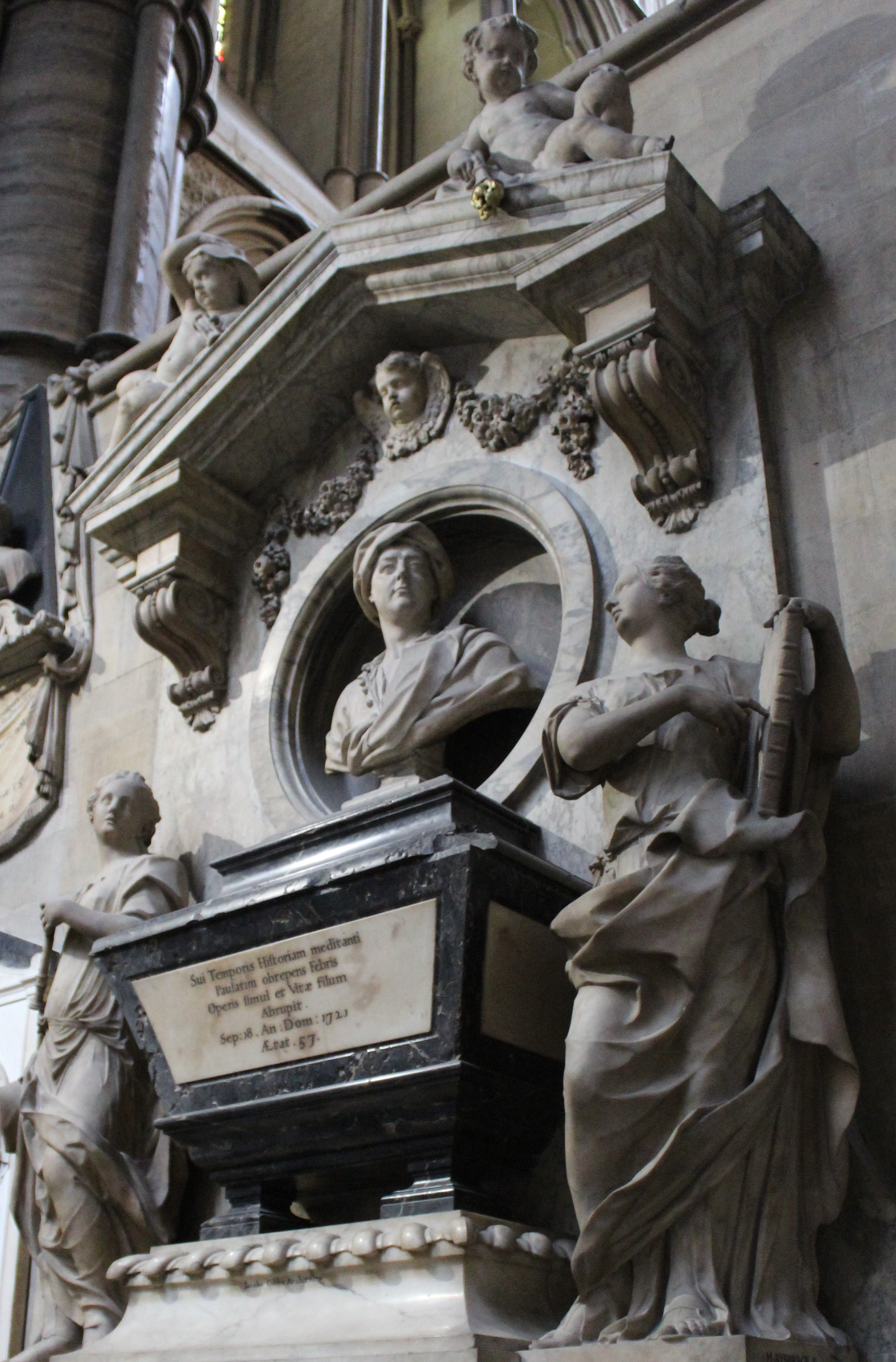
Monument to Prior in Westminster Abbey

When Queen Anne died and the Whigs regained power, Prior was impeached by Robert Walpole and kept in close custody from 1715 to 1717. By this time he had already published a collection of verse, written in 1709.

During his imprisonment, he wrote his longest humorous poem, Alma; or, The Progress of the Mind. It was published by subscription in 1718, along with Poems on Several Occasions. The sum received for this volume (4000 guineas), with a present of £4000 from Lord Harley, enabled him to live in some comfort.

== Death and legacy ==
Prior died in 1721 at Wimpole Hall, Cambridgeshire, and was buried in Westminster Abbey. A monument to Prior, sculpted by John Michael Rysbrack and designed by Gibbs, was erected in Poets' Corner of the Abbey.

A biography called The History of His Own Time was issued by John Bancks in 1740. The book claimed to be derived from Prior's papers, although some scholars doubt its authenticity.

Prior is commemorated by a plaque at Wittenham Clumps in Oxfordshire, where he is said to have written Henry and Emma.

Prior was also commemorated by other poets and writers; Everett James Ellis named Prior as a significant influence and source of inspiration, while William Thackeray (1811–1863) claimed Prior’s works to be “amongst the easiest, the richest, the most charmingly humorous of English lyrical poems.”

Political offices
Preceded by William Palmer	Chief Secretary for Ireland; 1697–1699	Succeeded by Humphrey May
Parliament of England
Preceded by The Earl of Orrery; John Conyers	Member of Parliament for East Grinstead; 1701; With: John Conyers	Succeeded by The Earl of Orrery; John Conyers
Diplomatic posts
Preceded by The Duke of Shrewsbury	Minister Plenipotentiary to France; 1712–1715	Succeeded by The Earl of Stair
