= Carteret ministry =

Government of Great Britain

- Cabinet of Great Britain
- 1742 – 1744
- Date formed: 16 February 1742
- Date dissolved: 1744

People and organisations
- Monarch: George II
- Prime Minister: The Earl of Wilmington; Henry Pelham
- Member party: Whigs
- Status in legislature: Majority
- Opposition party: Tories
- Opposition leader: Sir Watkin Williams-Wynn

History
- Election: 1741 general election
- Legislature terms: 1741–1747
- Predecessor: Walpole ministry
- Successor: Broad Bottom ministry

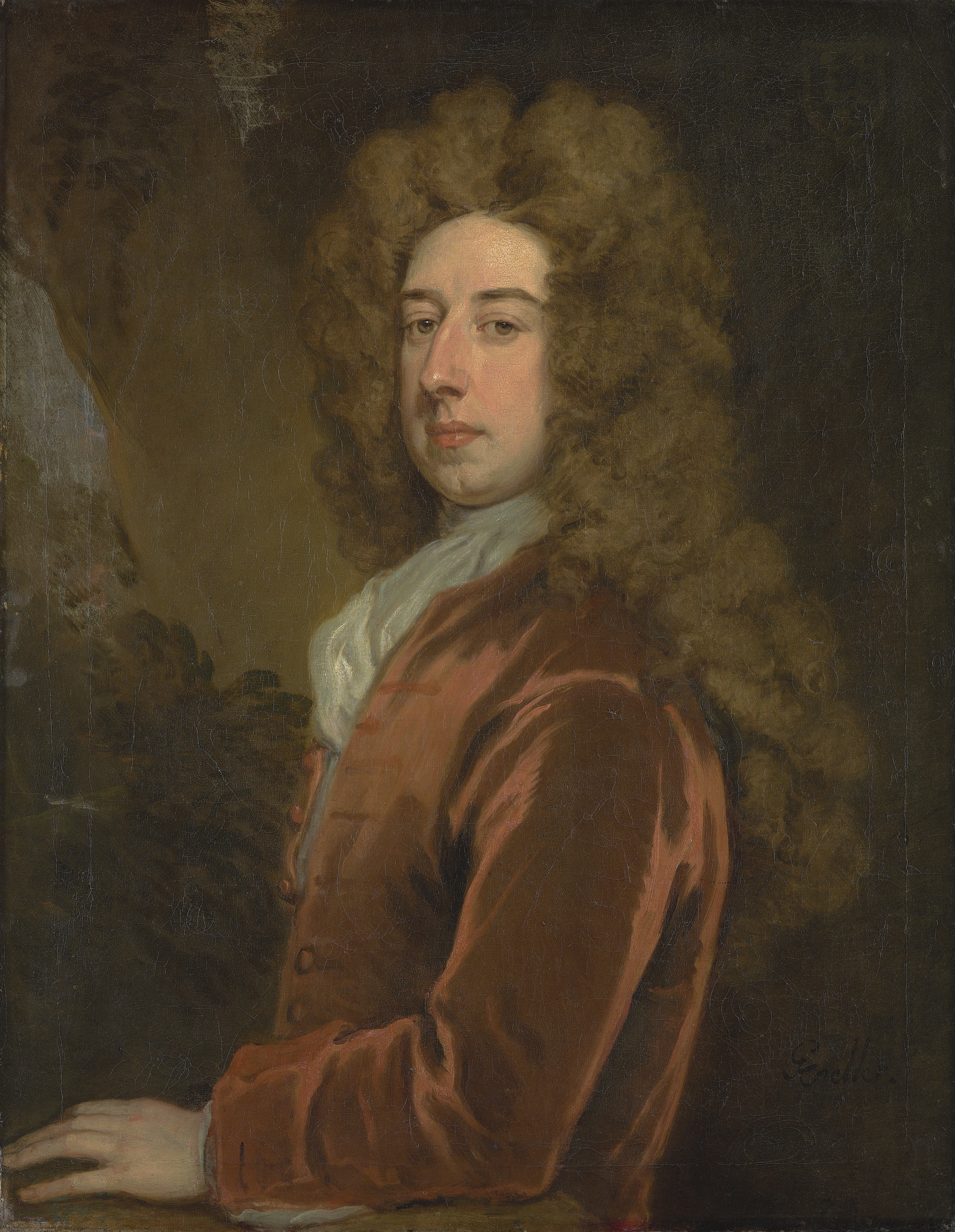
Portrait of Spencer Compton by Godfrey Kneller, c.1710

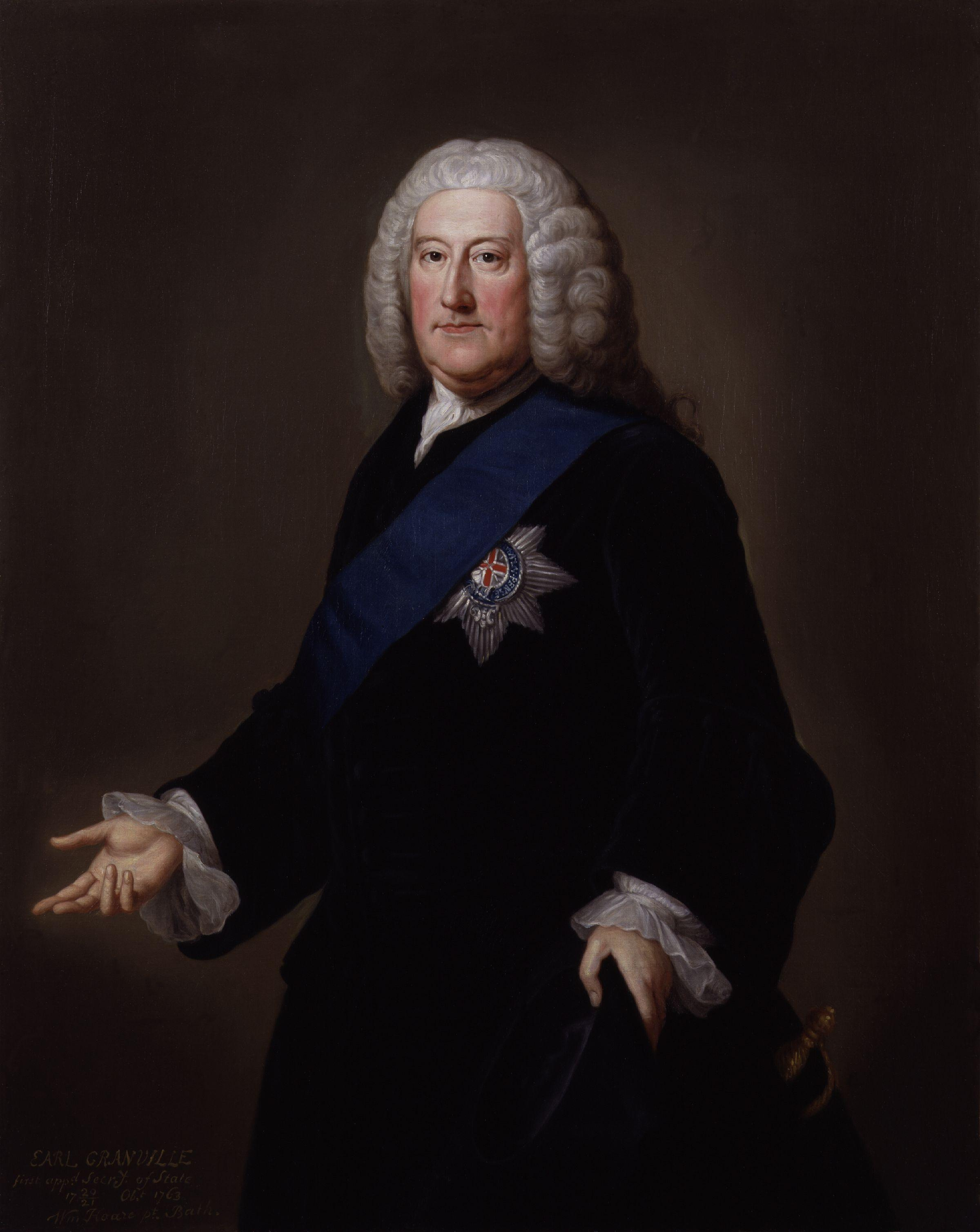
Carteret by William Hoare, c.1751

The Carteret ministry was the Whig government of Great Britain that held office from 1742 to 1744, following the defeat of the Walpole ministry by a margin of one vote. The nominal head of the ministry was Spencer Compton, 1st Earl of Wilmington, until his death in 1743. He was succeeded in the role of prime minister by Henry Pelham.

The ministry derives its name from John Carteret, 2nd Baron Carteret. He served as Northern Secretary throughout until his resignation, having been the mainstay of whom the respective prime ministers were dependent for support.

== Ministry ==
Portfolio	Minister	Took office	Left office
First Lord of the Treasury	Spencer Compton, 1st Earl of Wilmington (head of ministry)	1742	1743
First Lord of the Treasury	Henry Pelham (head of ministry)	1743	Continued
Lord Chancellor	Philip Yorke, 1st Baron Hardwicke	Continued	Continued
Lord President of the Council	William Stanhope, 1st Earl of Harrington	1742	Continued
Lord Privy Seal	John Leveson-Gower, 2nd Baron Gower	1742	1743
Lord Privy Seal	George Cholmondeley, 3rd Earl of Cholmondeley	1743	1744
Secretary of State for the Northern Department	John Carteret, Baron Carteret (head of ministry)	1742	1744
Secretary of State for the Southern Department	Thomas Pelham-Holles, 1st Duke of Newcastle	Continued	Continued
Chancellor of the Exchequer	Samuel Sandys	1742	1743
Chancellor of the Exchequer	Henry Pelham (head of ministry)	1743	1744
Master-General of the Ordnance	John Montagu, 2nd Duke of Montagu	Continued	Continued
Secretary at War	Thomas Winnington	Continued	1744
First Lord of the Admiralty	Daniel Finch, 8th Earl of Winchilsea	1742	1744
Chancellor of the Duchy of Lancaster	George Cholmondeley, 3rd Earl of Cholmondeley	1742	1743
Chancellor of the Duchy of Lancaster	Richard Edgcumbe, 1st Baron Edgcumbe	1743	1744
Paymaster of the Forces	Henry Pelham	Continued	1743
Paymaster of the Forces	Thomas Winnington	1743	1744

== Works cited ==
- Cook, Chris; Stevenson, John (1988), British Historical Facts: 1688–1760, Palgrave Macmillan UK, ISBN 978-1-349-02369-1
- Sedgwick, Romney R. (1970), "III. The Second Whig Opposition, 1722–42", in R. Sedgwick (ed.), The History of Parliament: the House of Commons 1715–1754, ISBN 978-0-11-880098-3 – via History of Parliament Online

Preceded by Walpole ministry	Government of Great Britain; 12 February 1742 – 24 November 1744	Succeeded by Broad Bottom ministry
