= John Conyers (East Grinstead politician) =

English politician (1650–1725)

John Conyers (6 March 1650 – 10 March 1725) of Walthamstow, Essex was an English lawyer and politician who sat in the English and British House of Commons for 30 years from 1695 to 1725.

Conyers was the eldest son of Tristram Conyers, serjeant-at-law, MP of Walthamstow and his wife Winifred Gerard, daughter of Sir Gilbert Gerard, 1st Baronet, MP of Flamberds, Harrow-on-the-Hill, Middlesex. He was educated at Merchant Taylors’ School from 1663 to 1665 and matriculated at Queen’s College, Oxford on 7 April 1666, aged 16. He then studied law at the Middle Temple from 1666, was called to the bar in 1672 and was made King's Counsel (KC) in about 1693. Conyers married, by licence dated 16 January 1681, Mary Lee, the daughter and heiress of George Lee of Stoke St. Milborough, Shropshire He became a bencher of his Inn in 1702. He was a cousin of Thomas Conyers, MP for Durham City,

Conyers was returned as Member of Parliament for East Grinstead at the 1695 general election, and sat until the 1708 general election when he was defeated. However also in 1708, he was returned unopposed as MP for West Looe. He was returned unopposed for East Grinstead again at the 1710 and 1713 general elections.

He was returned as MP for East Grinstead again in 1715 and 1722 and voted against the Government in all instances. He sat until his death in 1725.

Conyers died on 10 March 1725. He and his wife had 16 children, including a son and five daughters. He was succeeded as MP for East Grinstead by his son Edward Conyers (c. 1693 – 23 April 1742).

Parliament of England
Preceded by Sir Thomas Dyke, Bt; The Earl of Orrery	Member of Parliament for East Grinstead; 1695–1707; With: Sir Thomas Dyke, Bt 1695–1698; The Earl of Orrery 1698–Jan 1701, Nov 1701–1702; Matthew Prior Jan–Nov 1701; John Toke 1702–1707	Succeeded by Parliament of Great Britain
Parliament of Great Britain
Preceded by Parliament of England	Member of Parliament for East Grinstead; 1707–1708; With: John Toke	Succeeded by Viscount Lumley; Henry Campion
Preceded by Sir Charles Hedges; Francis Palmes	Member of Parliament for West Looe; 1708–1710; With: Sir Charles Hedges	Succeeded by Sir Charles Hedges; Arthur Maynwaring
Preceded by Viscount Lumley; Henry Campion	Member of Parliament for East Grinstead; 1710–1725; With: Leonard Gale 1710–1713; Hon. Spencer Compton 1713–1715, March 1722–November 1722; The Viscount Shannon 1715–March 1722, November 1722–1725	Succeeded by Edward Conyers; The Viscount Shannon
