= Telegraphy in the United States =

The telegraph represented a disruptive innovation in the history of the United States from its invention in the 1830s onward by quickly becoming a vital part of the nation's communication infrastructure. Its relative importance declined with the spread of telephones in the 20th century. Telegraph service permitted short texts to be sent cheaply and arrive in a matter of minutes to hours, instead of days or weeks. Telegraphy facilitated faster and more profitable freight and passenger railway traffic, consolidated financial and commodity markets, sped political news and commentary, and lowered information costs for companies.

== Early years: 1832 to 1860 ==
Progress in electric devices in Europe lead inventors to create electrical telegraph systems, such as the Cooke and Wheatstone telegraph in England. They invented complex systems with a separate key for each letter of the alphabet. In 1832, Samuel Morse, an American artist, with help from scientist Leonard Gale, searched for a simpler idea for an electromagnetic recording system. Telegraphers would tap their fingers on a knob and the system imprinted dots and dashes onto a moving strip of paper on a distant receiver. Furthermore, he created the American Morse code in the 1840s, allowing telegraphers to rapidly send and receive messages. With experience they could listen to the clicks and "hear" words without looking at the paper record. Morse patented the system and tried to persuade Congress to adopt it as a government-owned and operated system like the post office. However, the Democrats in power were hostile to federal spending. In 1837, Morse obtained funding from Congress to build a telegraph line between Washington and Baltimore, a distance of about forty miles. He spent seven years perfecting the system. Finally on May 24, 1844, he sent the first message, "What hath God wrought." Politicians in Washington were paying close attention to the national presidential nominating conventions underway in Baltimore and immediately recognized the advantages of near-instantaneous news reports.

By 1856, long-distance lines from The Magnetic Telegraph Company linked New York City to Philadelphia, Baltimore, and Washington, along with points in between. Soon there was a link from Washington across the South to New Orleans.

In 1851, Hiram Sibley formed the Western Union Telegraph Company. It acquired local and regional telegraph companies, and soon became the largest in the United States, headed toward a near monopoly in 1866. Meanwhile, the British replaced their own slow system with the faster Morse system.

== Newspaper users ==
The introduction of telegraphy had a dramatic impact on the newspaper industry. A group of New York newspapers formed the New York Associated Press (NYAP) in 1846 to regularize news transmission. According to Jonathan Silberstein-Loeb, after a rocky start, NYAP's relationship with telegraph companies improved significantly once Western Union became the dominant player in 1866. The two companies joined forces to create a formidable monopoly, with Western Union providing NYAP with preferential rates on the condition that they solely use their services and not those of their rivals. This mutually beneficial arrangement was decisive in building both companies. Meanwhile, regional press associations outside of New York City sprouted up among newspapers and aligned themselves with NYAP, with the Western Associated Press being one of the most important. Over time, the Western Associated Press surpassed NYAP in significance and was eventually renamed the Associated Press (AP) in the 1890s.

According to Richard R. John, the AP transformed into a news broker where information was a tradable commodity. News brokers were granted privileges like special rates and, crucially, priority access to the telegraph wires by telegraph officials. Now every newspaper had access to major news stories hours after they were first reported, as well as texts of influential editorials and speeches. Clippings from the New-York Tribune edited by Horace Greeley became especially influential for the Whig Party newspapers, and after 1854 for the press of the new Republican Party. The coordination of the distribution of time-sensitive information by newsbrokers, such as the AP, gave them substantial influence that many deemed politically hazardous, resulting in various public controversies during the Gilded Age.

== 1861–1900 ==
In 1861-1865 the telegraph played a crucial role in the American Civil War, allowing for rapid communication inside marching armies, and between the national capitals and field armies, which was facilitated by the operation of the U.S. Military Telegraph Corps. The Confederacy had a much weaker system than the Union, and Union forces systematically listened in, or destroyed its lines. For instance, after the bombardment of Fort Sumter in April 1861, President Lincoln approved the seizure of the telegraph lines running out of Washington. In May of that year, Lincoln approved and ordered U.S. Marshals to enter telegraph offices in the major cities across the nation and seize copies of all telegrams, sent and received in the past year.

In 1866 the first transatlantic telegraph cable was completed, connecting America and Europe.

The completion of the First transcontinental telegraph in 1861 allowed messages to be sent from coast to coast in a matter of hours rather than weeks. In the late 1860s and 1870s, the telegraph expanded rapidly westward, connecting cities like Chicago, St. Louis, Denver, and San Francisco. By the 1880s, telegraph lines crisscrossed the country, connecting practically all towns and cities of all sizes. The telegraph was used for everything from sending personal messages to conducting business deals and transmitting news stories.

According to business historian H. W. Brands, the telegraph separated communication from transportation. This caused American financial markets based in New York to become even more consolidated as they dominated the nation's economy. Prompt news of price changes is most valuable commodity traded in financial markets. With the telegraph replacing communication via steam boat and railroad train, high priority data now move across the states at low cost. Speculators based in New York had an advantage, and other cities could not compete. The Atlantic cable further expanded the geography of speedy information, allowing European investors to operate in the American market almost as efficiently as those with offices in the states, as the message time between London and New York plunged from several weeks to just several minutes.

=== Telephone challenge ===
By 1900, the telegraph had become an integral part of American life, linking people and businesses across the country and around the world. In 1876, Alexander Graham Bell invented the telephone. After 1920 it replaced the telegraph as the primary means of communication between cities. As the telegraph was eventually supplanted, it paved the way for the development of modern communication systems and revolutionized the way people communicate over long distances. Willey and Rice (1933) state: "Between 1902 and 1927 the per capita use of the telegraph increased by only 60 percent, which appears to be a relatively small growth for so dynamic a period until it is remembered that the telephone had its development during these same years."

== Importance of speed ==
Telegrams were fast, and the historian examines what circumstances made the speed of major importance. The telegraph arrived when the United States already had a full-scale postal system. It delivered local mail quickly, with several deliveries a day. For intercity mail it depended on available transportation, and tried to be faster than private messengers. Much faster mail delivery came with the railroad, so the improvement in train speed had great impact. Telegrams were much faster, but for long distances the message had to be rekeyed along the way by relay operators so there was a delay. Speed made a great difference in military decision-making during the Civil War, when a one hour delay could affect the outcome of a battle. The convoluted command structure, however, meant that critical information was often not sent to the field commander who needed it. In normal times a large fraction of the telegraph traffic was devoted to speculation on the cost of various commodities. Buyers searched for the lowest price and producers looked for the highest price. Increasingly most of the telegrams dealt with speculation in future prices. A speculator would sell a promise regarding product X for delivery on day Y at price Z. But the speculator never actually possesses any Y. Every so often conditions change that will affect the price. The first speculator to learn about the change and act will make a profit—laggards will lose money because speed is of the essence. In speculation, telegrams become a decisive advantage over the mail or private messengers. Railroads depended on the telegraph to coordinate the routing of trains in opposite directions over a single-track system with sidings, thus saving time for both trains. Big city newspapers competed for street sales and when one had a scoop it sold papers faster than its rivals. In dealing with a local emergency such as medical conditions, accidents, or fires, sending a telegram rarely was called for. Telegrams were essential to warn towns downstream that a flash flood was coming.

== Western Union Telegraph Company ==
The New York and Mississippi Valley Printing Telegraph Company was founded in Rochester, New York in 1851. In 1856 it merged with its competitor the Erie and Michigan Telegraph Company, and changed its name to Western Union Telegraph Company. In 1857, Western Union participated in the 'Treaty of Six Nations', an attempt by six of the largest telegraph firms to create a system of regional telegraphy monopolies with a shared network of main lines. After the creation of the 'Six Nations' system, Western Union continued to acquire hundreds of local and regional telegraph companies and by 1864 had transformed from a regional monopoly into a national oligopolist with its only serious competitors being the American Telegraph Company and the United States Telegraph Company.

Western Union completed the first transcontinental telegraph in 1861. In 1866, Western Union acquired the American Telegraph Company & the United States Telegraph Company, its two main competitors, gaining a virtual monopoly over the American telegraphy industry. The company also began to develop new telegraphy-related services beyond the transmission and delivery of telegrams, launching the first stock ticker in 1866, a standardized time service in 1870 and wire money transfer in 1871.

In the 1870s, the company faced increased competition from newly formed rival telegraphy conglomerate Atlantic and Pacific Telegraph Company and from the nascent telephony industry led by the Bell Telephone Company. Western Union instead attempted to launch a rival telephony system before settling a patent lawsuit with Bell and leaving the telephone business completely in 1879. Financier Jay Gould orchestrated a merger of the Atlantic and Pacific Telegraph Company with Western Union in 1881, giving him a controlling share of the merged company.

In 1867 Western Union had 2,600 offices connected by 85,000 miles of wire. That year it handled 5.9 million messages with revenue of $6.0 million. By 1890 it had 19,400 offices linked by 679,000 miles of wire. It handled 56 million messages with a revenue of $29.1 million.

By 1900, Western Union operated a million miles of telegraph lines and two international undersea cables. AT&T gained control of Western Union in 1909. However, in 1913 AT&T, under federal indictment for violating the Sherman Antitrust Act of 1890, was forced to sell its shares in the company which once again became independent.

Western Union acquired its only major competitor in the American telegraphy sector Postal Telegraph, Inc. in 1945, effectively giving the company monopoly power over the telegram industry. After 1945 the telegraphy industry began to experience a decline, with total telegraph messages almost halving from 1945 to 1960.

In 1931, the American Telephone and Telegraph Company (AT&T) introduced the Teletypewriter Exchange Service (TWX) which operated over telephone circuits between devices located directly in private businesses. This enabled a secretary to type and send a written message to another TWX machine elsewhere, without using Western Union services, or going to a telegraph office. TWX was replaced by fax machines in the 1960s and by the Internet starting in the 1990s.

== Women's Involvement in the Telegraph ==
=== The Entry of Women Into the Telegraph Industry ===
By the late 1840s, the demand for trained telegraphers had begun to quickly exceed the supply needed, so organizers of major telegraph companies proposed the idea of hiring women. By the early 1850s, women began to understand the promise of the telegraph industry, as they began to enter the field in increasing numbers and sought training in telegraphy through private telegraph schools or informal apprenticeships. This demand for women telegraphers again surged in the early 1860s, at the start of the Civil War, when women took the place of male telegraphers who were drafted to serve in the Union and Confederate forces. How Women Can Make Money, an encyclopedia published in the early 1860s by Virginia Penny, encapsulates this moment of transition. The book addresses how women telegraphers in America were set to outperform men and includes Penny's predictions that women would enter the field in large numbers.

Over time, many telegraph companies became increasingly more open to hiring women, believing that their patience, fine motor skills, and attention to detail made them better suited for the task of telegraphy than men. Those companies benefited from hiring women by paying them less than men, due to prevailing assumptions that women’s work was inherently less valuable. At the same time, telegraph work offered significant advantages for women themselves. Women gained more skill training, a degree of economic independence uncommon for the period, an opportunity for higher education, and entry into new social networks. Moreover, women telegraphers played an active role in the women’s rights movement, proving their ability to organize as a unit and participate effectively in strikes.

=== Women's Issues in the Telegraph Industry ===
With more women holding established positions in the telegraph industry in the 1870s, new gender-based tensions arose in the workplace. These issues included men’s use of vulgar language, harassment, and general anxieties surrounding sexuality. Men often used coarse language and rough behavior to assert their dominance in a field that was becoming increasingly more female. However, it was often difficult to determine when this vulgarity crossed the line into targeted harassment, especially because the culture of the telegraph offices normalized a level of “rough talk.” That ambiguity left women in a vulnerable position, as complaints about inappropriate behavior were often dismissed as an overreaction to workplace norms. That said, the rules were clear: Rule 34 of the Western Union Rule Book forbade the use of “Profane, obscene, or other ungentlemanly language.”

Another issue concerned drinking on the job. There was a large number of male telegraphers who were heavy drinkers, yet they simultaneously expressed anxieties about exposing women to those “moral corruptions,” creating a double standard in which men defended their own practices while portraying women as delicate beings who needed protection from them.

The working hours for women were also a concern. By the 1900s, postal laws restricted women’s working hours from 8 A.M. to 8 P.M., due to societal and safety concerns. By the 1910s, several states capped women’s working hours at 8 hours. While that protected overworked women in factories, women telegraphers often found it difficult to keep or obtain jobs, as they were often unavailable for important evening shifts.

Many women telegraphers also faced criticism for supposedly being absent from work more frequently than men. That accusation soon turned into an excuse to justify treating women as less reliable and, therefore, subservient to men. Although women's absences were frequently attributed to menstrual periods, women’s time away from work was more often due to caring for ill children or attending other family obligations. Meanwhile, men were commonly absent for far less legitimate reasons, such as being hungover from heavy drinking.

The idea of equal pay was also heavily debated in the second half of the nineteenth century. Because the maximum wages for women were set lower, female telegraph workers could be employed for less money than men, despite them doing the same quality of work, if not faster and better. As women gained more skills and experience, they began to protest this wage gap. In the late 1890s, many telegraph services signed a petition asking for a modest wage increase, but the petition was ultimately rejected because company officials and labor leaders argued that women lacked the long-term commitment and competence to justify higher pay.

=== Women's Accomplishments in Telegraphy ===
Many exceptional women in the telegraph industry challenged societal norms and made exceptional contributions to the industry. Mary Cooke, for example, created innovative telegraphy products that advanced the field, and Nellie Bye excelled as a telegraph operator who then traveled worldwide as a journalist. Other skilled operators, such as Emma Hunter and Ella Cheever Thayer, gained recognition for their speed and precision, positively influencing people’s view of women in telecommunications. These women in the telegraph industry advocated for standardized working hours, livable wages, and equal pay, being trailblazers for women in the United States who wanted to enter the workforce and laying the groundwork for reforms spearheaded by early women’s labor organizations.

== See also ==
- The telephone in United States history
