= Pieter Mortier =

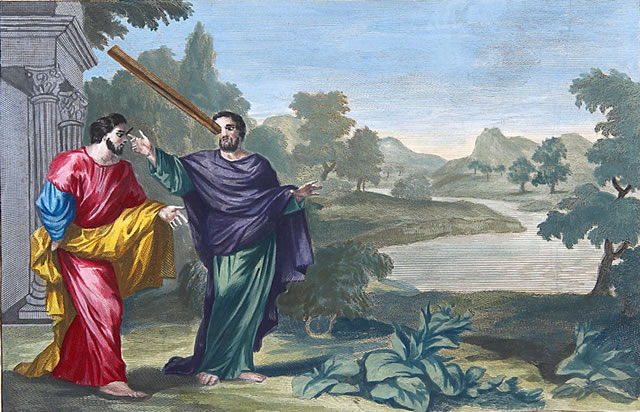
Matthew 7:2–5 - The Parable of the Mote and the Beam, ca. 1700

Pieter Mortier, or Pierre Mortier as publisher of books in French, was the name of three successive generations of booksellers and publishers in the Dutch Republic.

== Pieter Mortier I (1661–1711) ==
The first Pieter Mortier (Leiden, 1661 – Amsterdam, 1711) was the son of a political refugee from France, and became a mapmaker and engraver. He travelled to Paris in 1681–1685, then returned to Amsterdam where he operated as a bookseller from 1685 until 1711. He won the privilege in 1690 of publishing maps and atlases by French publishers in Amsterdam for the Dutch market. He used this privilege to win a similar set of privileges for printing an "illustrated print bible" in 1700. Also known as "Mortier's Bible" (Dutch: Mortierbijbel or Prentbijbel Mortier), this book's official name was Historie des Ouden en Nieuwen Testaments, verrykt met meer dan vierhonderd printverbeeldingen in koper gesneeden ("History of the Old and New Testaments: enriched with more than four hundred printed illustrations cut in copper"). The text was written by David Martin (a French Protestant theologian in exile), while the engravings were made by several artists who were well known at the time, including Bernard Picart, Jan Luyken and Gerard Hoet. According to Houbraken, David van der Plas worked with Pieter Mortier I on etchings for Bybelsche Tafereelen (Bible stories), published in Amsterdam in 1700.

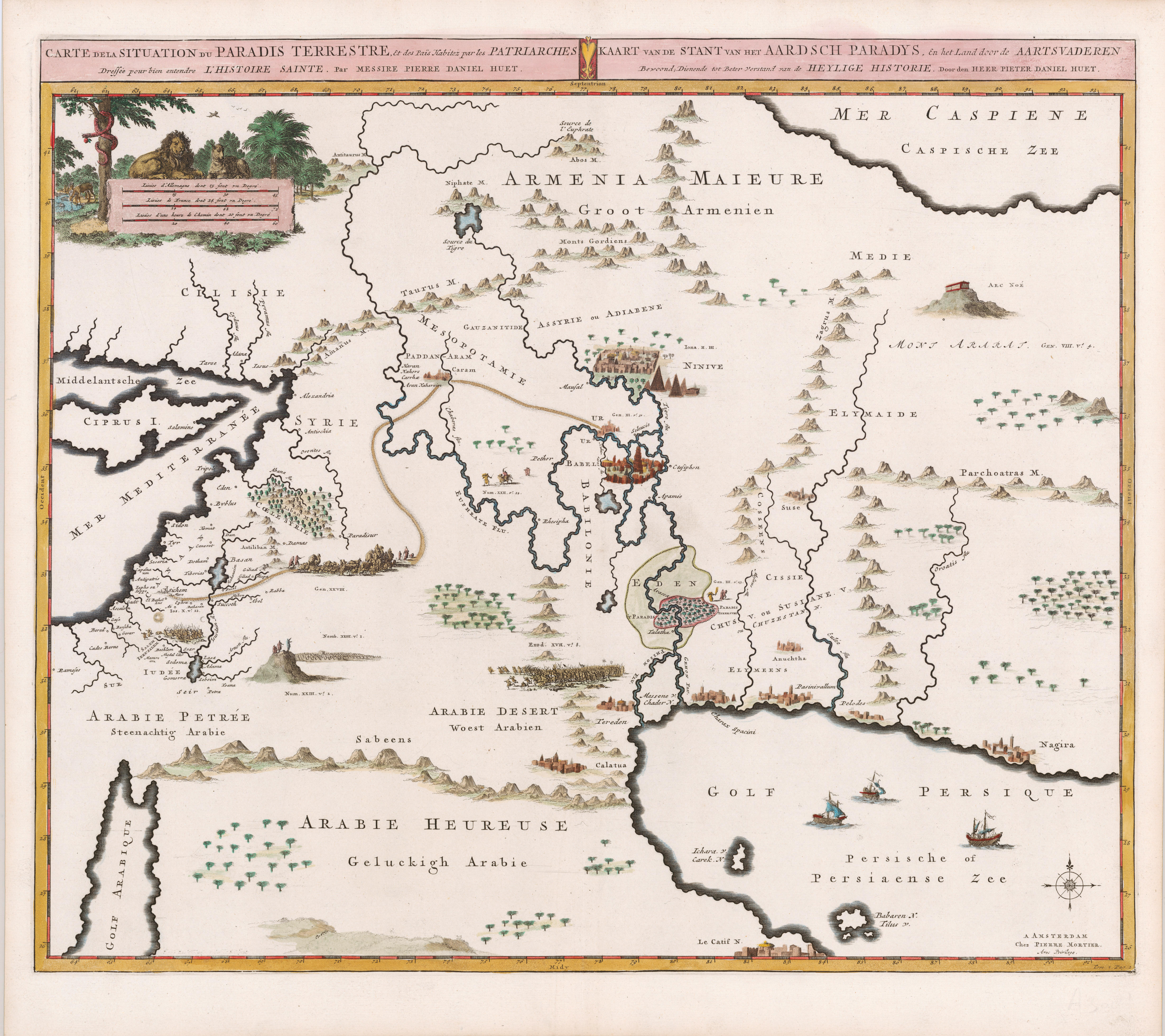
Pierre Mortier, Situation du Paradise Terrestre, 1700

In Amsterdam, he was located at Middeldam, 1685–1686, and then at Vijgendam, 1686–1711. His sign board was "Stad van Parijs" between 1685 and 1700. He was known to have used a fictitious publishing address in Antwerp and also in London. The Short Title Catalogue Netherlands attributes the publication of 261 titles to Pieter Mortier I. During the first decade of the eighteenth century, Mortier challenged the Huguenot Estienne Roger for domination of the polyphonic sheet music market by implementing a price war.

He married Amelia 's-Gravensande (1666–1719), who, as a widow, ran his publishing business until her death. The couple had two sons, Pieter Mortier II (see below) and Cornelis Mortier (1699–1783), who in partnership with Johannes Covens I (1697–1774) began the map publishing company Covens & Mortier (1721–1866) that became the largest cartographic publisher in the eighteenth century.

== Pieter Mortier II ==
Pieter Mortier II was active in Amsterdam as a bookseller in 1730, 1734–1735, 1740–1741, 1745, and 1749, as well as being the town printer. Additionally, he was also active in Leipzig in 1745–1746, 1751, 1753. His Amsterdam business was located on Kalverstraat in 1742 and at Nieuwendyk, at the fourth house from Zoutsteeg. His sign board was "L'Envie". The Short Title Catalogue Netherlands attributes the publication of 249 titles to him, including French language editions by Rene Duguay-Trouin, John Locke, Pierre Bayle and the last four volumes of Guillaume de Lamberty's fourteen volume Memoires pour servir a l'histoire du XVIII siecle.

== Pieter Mortier III ==
Pieter Mortier III, sometimes known as "Mortier le jeune", was active in Amsterdam between 1754 and 1781. he was known to have been a bookseller, 1763, 1764–1772, 1774–1777, 1779–1781; town printer, 1763–1781; and university printer, 1765–1766, 1771–1772, 1774, 1776, 1778–1779. The Short Title Catalogue Netherlands attributes the publication of 202 titles to him. His business was located in Amsterdam at Nieuwendyk, the fourth house from the Zoutsteeg, 1764–1768; Warmoestraat, east side the second from St. Annastraat, 1769–1777; and Leliegragt, on the north side, the seventh house from Heeregragt, 1779–1781.
