= Spencer Compton, 1st Earl of Wilmington =

Prime Minister of Great Britain from 1742 to 1743

The Right Honourable The Earl of Wilmington KG KB PC
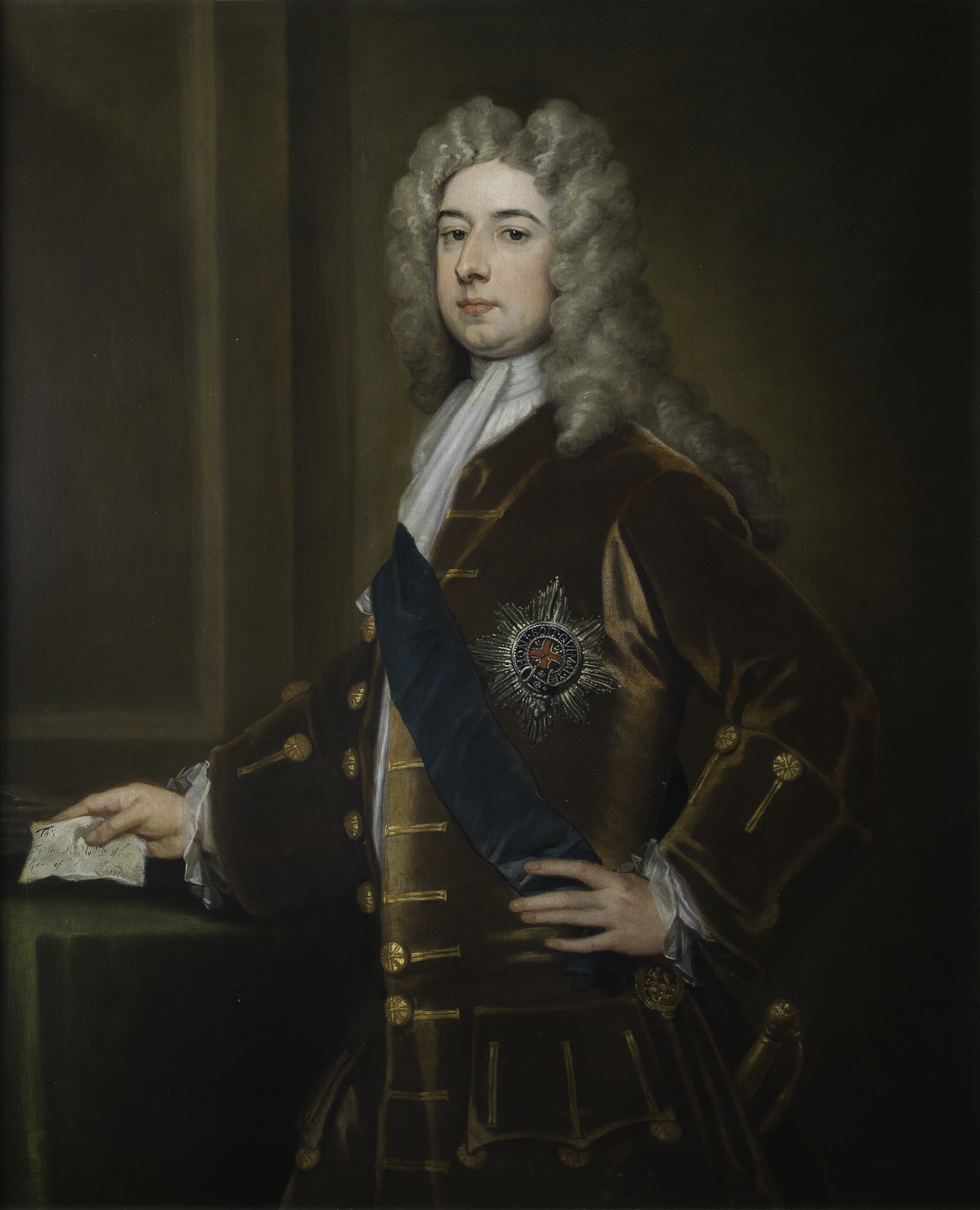
- Portrait by Godfrey Kneller, c. 1715

Prime Minister of Great Britain
- In office 16 February 1742 – 2 July 1743
- Monarch: George II
- Preceded by: Robert Walpole
- Succeeded by: Henry Pelham

Lord President of the Council
- In office 31 December 1730 – 13 February 1742
- Monarch: George II
- Prime Minister: Robert Walpole
- Preceded by: The Lord Trevor
- Succeeded by: The Earl of Harrington

Speaker of the House of Commons of Great Britain
- In office 17 March 1715 – 1727
- Monarch: George I
- Prime Minister: Robert Walpole (from 1721)
- Preceded by: Sir Thomas Hanmer
- Succeeded by: Arthur Onslow

Personal details
- Born: 1673 Compton Wynyates, England
- Died: 2 July 1743 (aged 69–70) Westminster, England
- Resting place: Compton Wynyates
- Party: Whig
- Parent: James Compton (father)
- Education: Trinity College, Oxford

Spencer Compton, 1st Earl of Wilmington (1673 – 2 July 1743) was a British Whig statesman who served continuously in government from 1715 until his death in 1743. He sat in the English and British House of Commons between 1698 and 1728, and was then raised to the peerage and sat in the House of Lords. He served as prime minister of Great Britain from 1742 until his death in 1743. He is considered to have been Britain's second prime minister, after Robert Walpole, but worked closely with the Secretary of State, Lord Carteret, in order to secure the support of the various factions making up the government. He is one of only three people in British history to have been the Speaker of the House of Commons and Prime Minister.

== Early life and education ==
Spencer Compton was born in 1673 in Compton Wynyates, a Tudor castle in Warwickshire. He was the third son of James Compton, 3rd Earl of Northampton, who fought for the royalists during the English Civil War and his wife Mary Noel, daughter of Baptist Noel, 3rd Viscount Campden. His father died in 1681 when Spencer was young and his brother, George Compton, become the sole beneficiary of the family's estates. Spencer was educated at St Paul's School and matriculated at Trinity College, Oxford on 28 February 1690, aged 15; thereafter he was admitted into Middle Temple in 1687.

== Early political career ==
=== English House of Commons ===
Although his family were High Tories, Compton turned to the Whigs after a quarrel with his brother, the 4th Earl of Northampton. He first stood for Parliament at East Grinstead on the interest of his kinsman the Earl of Dorset at the 1695 English general election but was unsuccessful. He was returned unopposed as Member of Parliament for Eye at a by-election on 3 June 1698. In Parliament he soon stood out as prominent amongst the Whigs and began a partnership with Robert Walpole that would last for over forty years. Compton was returned unopposed for Eye at the two general elections of 1701 and in 1702 and 1705.

=== Paymaster of Pensions ===
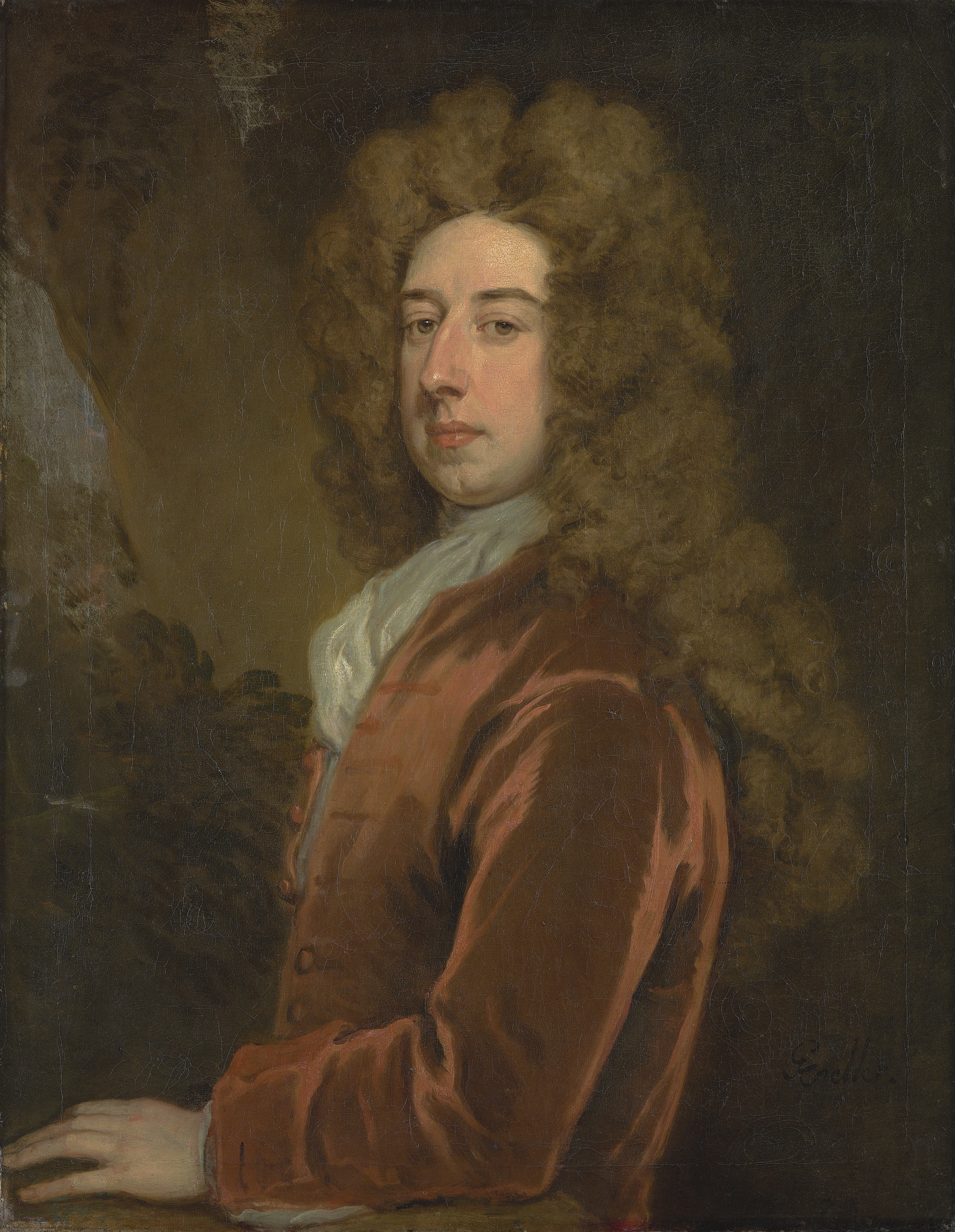
Portrait of Spencer Compton, by Godfrey Kneller, c. 1710

In 1707 Compton became Paymaster of Pensions, a post that he retained for the next six years. He was returned unopposed again at the 1708 British general election and was particularly active in Parliament thereafter. He remained as chairman of the committee of privileges and elections, and was a teller on the Whig side in many divisions. He managed several bills and on 14 December 1709 was nominated to the committee to draw up the articles of impeachment against Dr Sacheverell. At the 1710 British general election he was dropped as a candidate for Eye by his patron Lord Cornwallis after a disagreement, and he was unwilling to risk standing anywhere else because of his involvement with the Sacheverell case. However he retained his post as Paymaster of Pensions after the Tory government took office in that year. It is believed that the Tories retained him because they sought to maintain the support of the Compton family. At the 1713 British general election he was returned as Whig MP for East Grinstead and when the Whigs took power in 1715 he was hopeful that he would enter a high office.

=== Speaker of the Commons ===
Instead of the high political office he had hoped for, Compton received the Court appointment of Treasurer to the Prince of Wales (later George II); shortly afterwards, however, he was unanimously elected as Speaker of the House of Commons. He held this post from 1715 to 1727. In 1716, he was invested a Privy Counsellor. He maintained the role of Speaker despite the split in the Whigs in 1717, in which he joined the Walpole-Townshend alliance and found himself in opposition to the government of the day. He managed to maintain his position though until 1720, when the split ended.

Compton had a reputation for being a lax Speaker, once telling an MP who complained of being interrupted, "No sir, you have a right to speak, but the House have a right to judge whether they will hear you." When Walpole became the leading minister of the day in 1721, there was speculation about his future should George I pass away and be succeeded by his son, who was more favourably inclined towards Compton than Walpole and declared that he would replace the latter with the former on accession. In order to avoid this, Walpole sought to keep Compton on the margins of government, though he was appointed as Paymaster of the Forces, a very lucrative post, from 1722 until 1730. In 1725, Compton entered Walpole's government as Lord Privy Seal and was also created a Knight of the Bath.

== In Government ==
=== Accession of George II ===
In 1727, George II succeeded to the throne and sought to bring about the change in leadership he had promised. However, Compton was not perceived as a man of great ability. He was described by a contemporary as "a plodding, heavy fellow, with great application but no talents". In particular he proved unable to compete with Walpole's proposals for an allowance for the king. At a meeting between the three, Compton declared he was not up to the task of government. He maintained a hatred of Walpole for the humiliation. With this passed his last serious chance of holding real control over policy, and his influence sharply declined as a result.

=== House of Lords and Patriot Whigs ===
In order to remove him from the Commons, Walpole had Compton raised to the peerage as Baron Wilmington, of Wilmington in the County of Sussex on 8 January 1728; two years later, on 14 May 1730, he was created Viscount Pevensey, of Pevensey in the County of Sussex and Earl of Wilmington and was appointed Lord President of the Council in December of that year. He became increasingly associated with the Patriot Whigs, those most critical of Walpole, but in Parliament generally stuck to the official line of the ministry. In 1730 he attempted to form a coalition between the Patriot Whigs and the Hanoverian Tories to bring down Walpole, but this failed and he continued in office. However, during the Excise Crisis of 1733, he failed to carry through a threat to resign, after being bought off with the promise to make him a Knight of the Garter, which he duly was. This further weakened any following he still commanded. He served as Lord President until 1742.

He was involved in the creation of the Foundling Hospital in 1739, which was an orphanage for abandoned children. This charity became the capital's most popular way to prove one's philanthropic credentials and had very distinguished Board members (including Wilmington).

== Prime Minister ==
In January 1742, he succeeded Walpole as First Lord of the Treasury and head of the Carteret ministry. Wilmington's time in office was short and undistinguished and he was a poor leader. His opposition controlled the House of Commons so his direct influence was greatly limited. His brief premiership was dominated by dealing with foreign affairs, particularly in the War of the Austrian Succession. His strong work ethic took its toll, and his health gradually deteriorated. He remained in office until his death on 2 July 1743; he was succeeded by the Paymaster of the Forces, Henry Pelham.

== Personal life ==
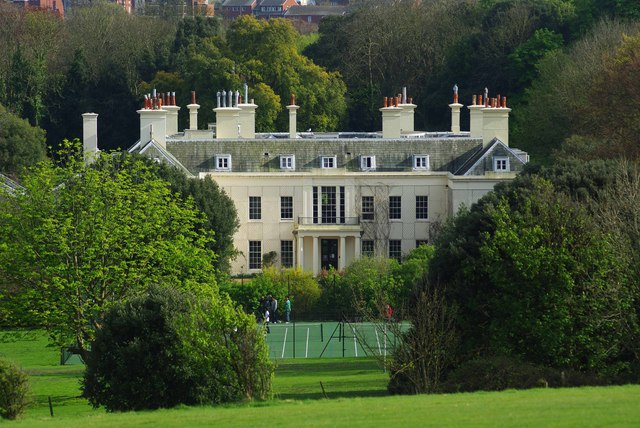
Compton Place, Eastbourne, in 2009

He bought the East Borne estate in Eastbourne, Sussex in 1724 and renamed it Compton Place. He engaged the architect Colen Campbell (and after Campbell's death William Kent) to rebuild the house. It was completed in 1731.

He never married and died without issue, therefore all his titles became extinct upon his death. Over 1110 items from his "large and valuable library" were auctioned by Christopher Cock over 10 evenings, from to 27 February to 7 March 1733. He was buried at the family seat of Compton Wynyates in Warwickshire. Compton Place passed to his nephew, James Compton, 5th Earl of Northampton.

== Arms ==
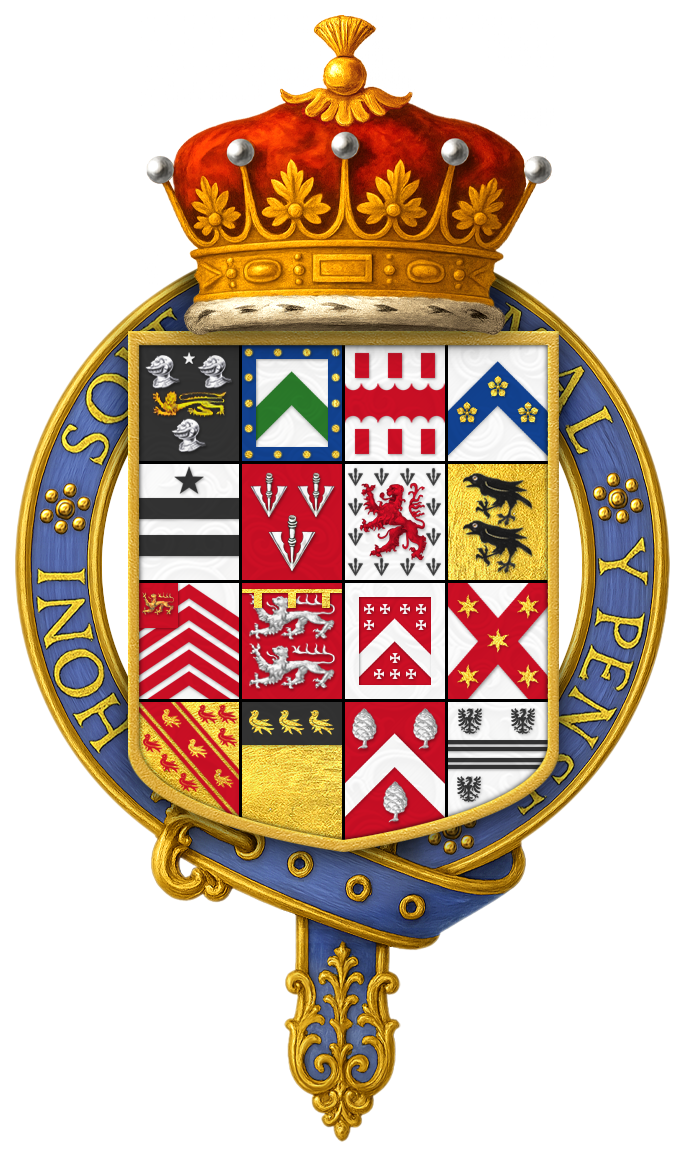
Quartered arms of Spencer Compton, 1st Earl of Wilmington, KG

Coat of arms of Spencer Compton, 1st Earl of Wilmington
| Crest A buck at gaze argent attired or. Escutcheon Sable, a lion passant guardant between three esquires' helmets argent.. Supporters Two bulls argent armed and unguled proper. Motto Tout bien ou rien (The whole good, or none). Orders The Most Noble Order of the Garter - Knigh |

Political offices
| Preceded by Sir Thomas Hanmer | Speaker of the House of Commons of Great Britain; 1715–1727 | Succeeded by Arthur Onslow |
| Preceded by The Lord Cornwallis | Paymaster of the Forces; 1722–1730 | Succeeded by Henry Pelham |
| Preceded by The Lord Trevor | Lord Privy Seal; 1730 | In commission Title next held by The Duke of Devonshire |
| Preceded by The Lord Trevor | Lord President of the Council; 1730–1742 | Succeeded by The Earl of Harrington |
| Preceded by The Earl of Orford | Prime Minister of Great Britain; 16 February 1742 – 2 July 1743 | Succeeded by Henry Pelham |
| Preceded by The Earl of Orford | First Lord of the Treasury; 1742–1743 | Succeeded by Henry Pelham |
Parliament of Great Britain
| Preceded by Charles Cornwallis; Sir Joseph Jekyll | Member of Parliament for Eye; 1698–1710; Served alongside: Sir Joseph Jekyll | Succeeded by Thomas Maynard; Sir Joseph Jekyll |
| Preceded by John Conyers; Leonard Gale (MP) | Member of Parliament for East Grinstead; 1713–1715; Served alongside: John Conyers | Succeeded by John Conyers; The Viscount Shannon |
| Preceded by Henry Campion; John Fuller | Member of Parliament for Sussex; 1715–1728; With: James Butler 1715–1722; Henry Pelham 1722–1728 | Succeeded by Henry Pelham; James Butler |
| Preceded by John Conyers; The Viscount Shannon | Member of Parliament for East Grinstead; 1722; Served alongside: John Conyers | Succeeded by John Conyers; The Viscount Shannon |
Peerage of Great Britain
| New creation | Earl of Wilmington; 1730–1743 | Extinct |
| New creation | Baron Wilmington; 1728–1743 | Extinct |
