= October Club (Tory Party) =

18th century Tory political club

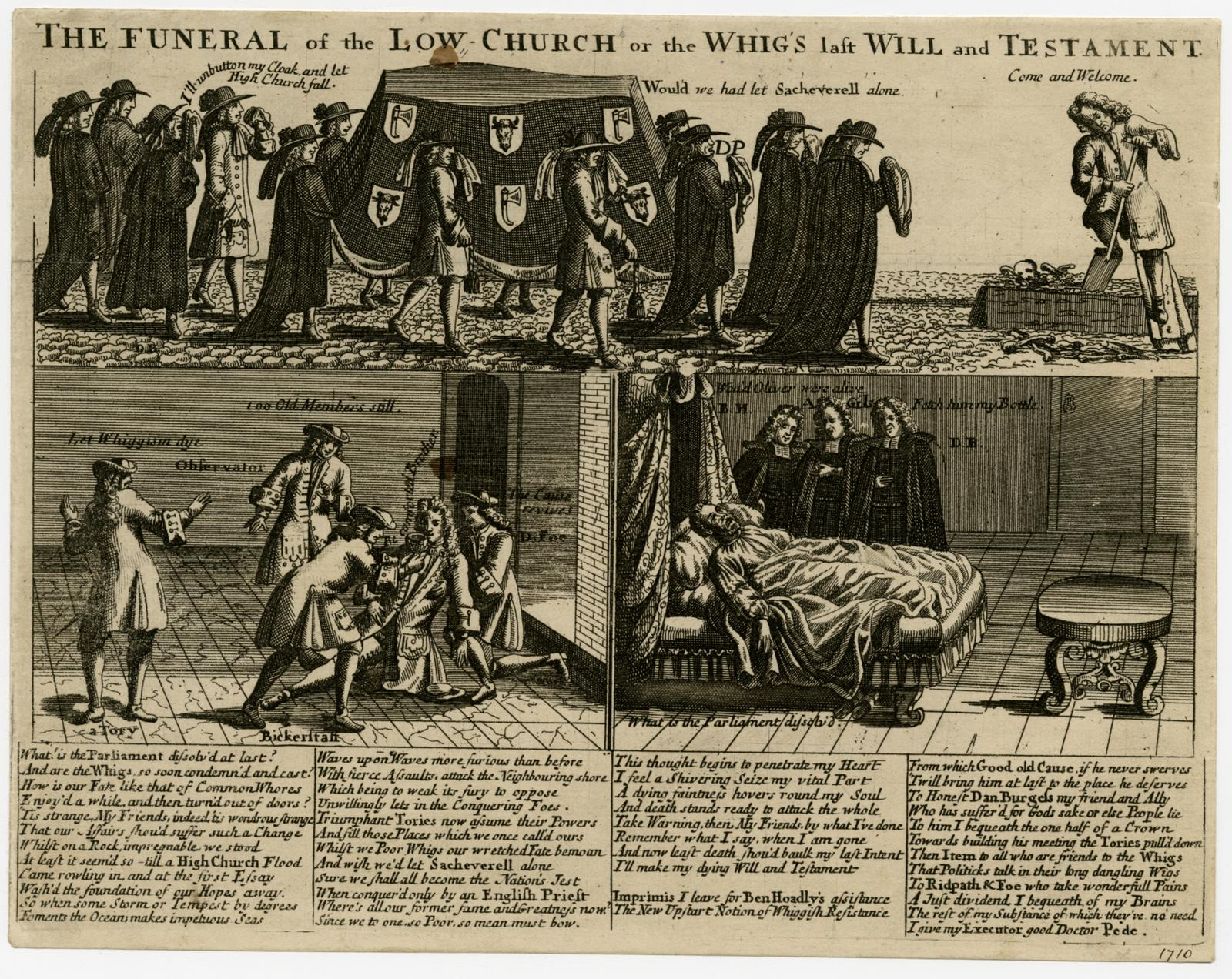
- A Tory satire on Whig loses at the 1710 general election
- Founded: 1711
- Dissolved: 1714
- Ideology: High Toryism, High Church, Country interests
- Party affiliation: Tories

The October Club was a group of Tory members of Parliament, established after the 1710 general election. The Club was active until approximately 1714. The group took its name from the strong ale they reportedly drank. The group has been characterised as having High Church tendencies.

== Background ==
The 1710 general election produced an overwhelming Tory majority and heralded the return of Robert Harley to high political office as Lord High Treasurer. Within a month of the new parliament assembling, however, Tory backbenchers were expressing dissatisfaction Harley's moderate policies. After Harley refused to set up an inquiry into the former administration's financial policies, on 5 February 1711 some Tories passed resolutions calling for inquires into suspected financial abuses by the former Whig ministry.

== The October Club ==
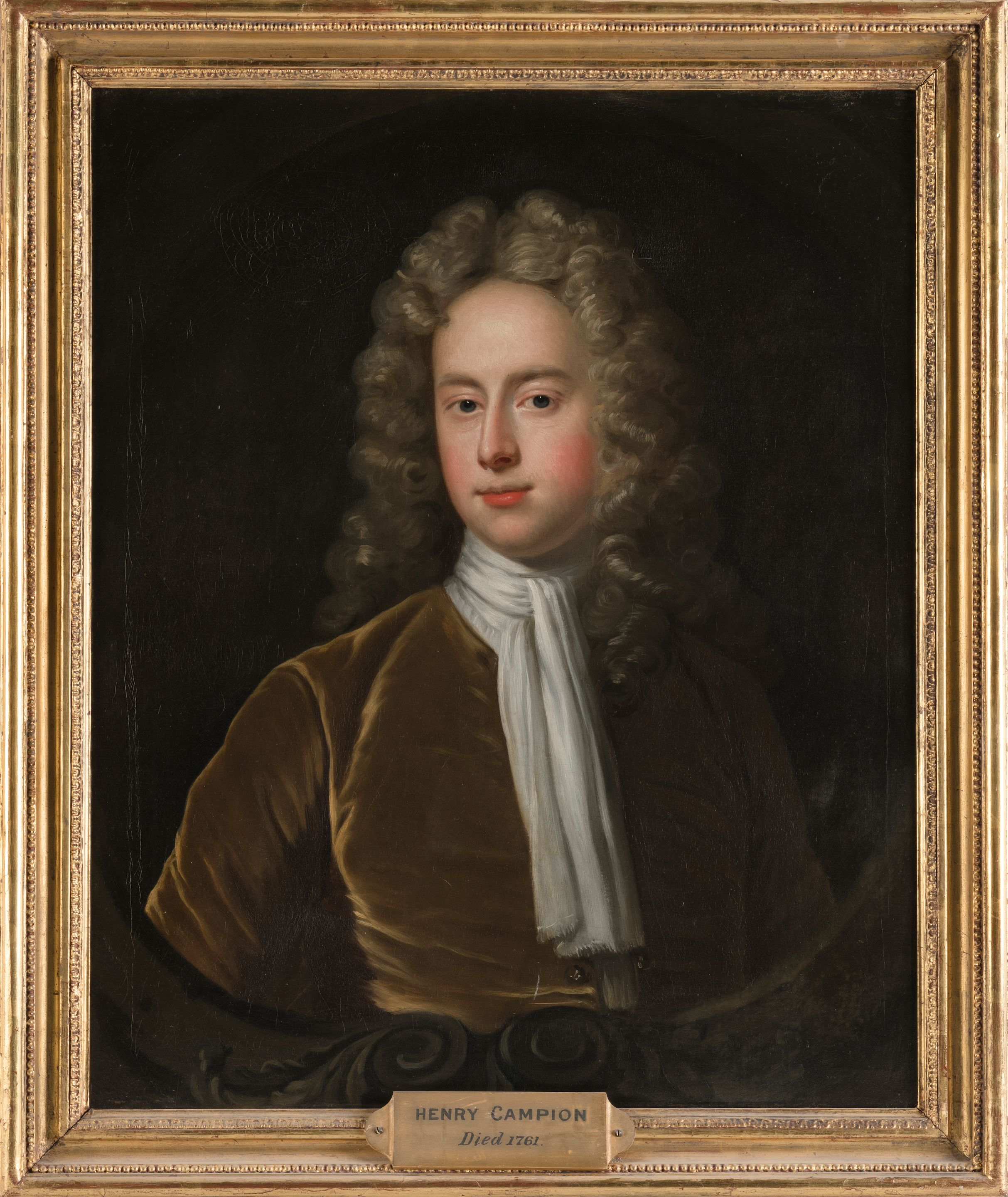
Henry Campion was a leading voice in the October Club; he later became a Jacobite

The rebellion against the Harley ministry resulted in the Tory malcontents forming a distinct faction within the wider party. This group began to coordinate its activities through weekly meetings, soon becoming known as the October Club after the strong autumn ale favored by the country gentlemen who attended.

Initially 70 to 80 strong, the October Club attracted not just young and inexperienced backbenchers but older Tories such as Ralph Freeman, Sir John Pakington, Sir Justinian Isham, Peter Shakerley and Sir Thomas Hanmer. The main aim of the October Club was to act as a Tory pressure group, advocating for a legislative programme which supported the landed gentry and showing Harley that its support was indispensable to the success of the ministry. The group grew to have "perhaps 200 members" out of around 350 Tory members of the Commons. The group were, according to H. T. Dickinson, "a major threat to the Harley administration". The contemporary political commentator and supporter of Harley, Jonathan Swift, warned that the Club was "driving things on to extremes against the Whigs" and urged moderation.

Linda Colley claims that the bulk of the membership were of Royalist ancestry. The Secret History of the October Club, attributed to Daniel Defoe, described the October Club members as the "archetype of extreme Toryism", who traced their political descent from the nonjurors of the 1690s. On the other side, the Character and Declaration of the October Club (1711) sought to clear the club of suspicions of disloyalty and asserted members' support for the Church of England and Protestant succession to the throne. The group included both English and Scottish parliamentarians; other known members of the club included William Whitelock, Henry Campion, Viscount Dupplin, George Mackenzie and Charles Eversfield.

=== The March Club and decline ===
The October Club, like the wider Tory party, became internally divided on the issue of the succession to Anne, Queen of Great Britain. Harley's ministry undertook a concerted effort to infiltrate the club with moderate Tories, which reduced the threat, and Henry St John was elected president of the club in early 1712. At the end of March 1712, a dissident minority of High Tories broke from the October Club to form the March Club; the March Club subsequently published a stinging rebuke to Henry St John. Many March Club members voted against the French Commerce Bill of 1713 in June 1713, while most October Club members supported the ministry. By April 1714 there is a reference to an October Club meeting attended by only 50–60 members. After the Hanoverian succession in 1714, the club ceased to meet and many October Club members joined the Loyal Brotherhood which had been established in 1709.
