= John Toke =

John Toke (1 June 1671 – 1746) of Godinton, Kent was an English Member of Parliament and lawyer.

He was a member of the Middle Temple. He was a Member of Parliament (MP) for East Grinstead from 1702 to 1708.

He died in 1746, aged 75.

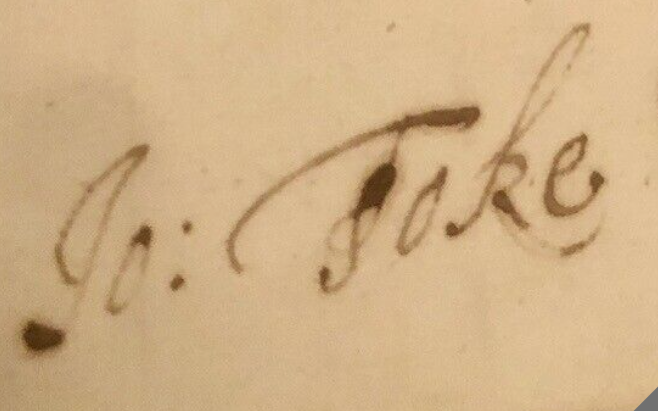
John Toke Signature on an indenture dated 1695 in the collection of Mr Andrew M Kennedy

Parliament of England
Preceded by The Earl of Orrery; John Conyers	Member of Parliament for East Grinstead; 1702–1708; With: John Conyers	Succeeded by Viscount Lumley; Henry Campion
