= Lionel Boyle, 3rd Earl of Orrery =

Anglo-Irish peer, English politician

Lionel Boyle, 3rd Earl of Orrery (11 July 1671 – 24 August 1703), styled Lord Broghill between 1679 and 1682, was an Anglo-Irish politician.

Boyle was the son of Roger Boyle, 2nd Earl of Orrery, by Mary, daughter of Richard Sackville, 5th Earl of Dorset. He was educated at the University of Utrecht. He succeeded his father in the earldom in 1682. However, as this was an Irish peerage it did not entitle him to a seat in the English House of Lords. He subsequently sat as member of parliament for East Grinstead from February to November 1695, from 1698 to January 1701 and again from November 1701 to 1702.

Lord Orrery married his first cousin Mary, the illegitimate daughter of Charles Sackville, 6th Earl of Dorset. He died at Earl's Court, Kensington, London, in August 1703, aged 32, and was succeeded in the earldom by his younger brother, Charles. The Dowager Countess of Orrery later married Richard Boyle, 2nd Viscount Shannon. She died in June 1714.

Parliament of England
Preceded by Simon Smith; Sir Thomas Dyke, Bt	Member of Parliament for East Grinstead; 1695; With: Sir Thomas Dyke, Bt	Succeeded by Sir Thomas Dyke, Bt; John Conyers
Preceded by Sir Thomas Dyke, Bt; John Conyers	Member of Parliament for East Grinstead; 1698–1701; With: John Conyers	Succeeded by John Conyers; Matthew Prior
Preceded by Matthew Prior; John Conyers	Member of Parliament for East Grinstead; 1701–1702; With: John Conyers	Succeeded by John Conyers; John Toke
Peerage of Ireland
Preceded by Roger Boyle	Earl of Orrery; 1682–1703	Succeeded by Charles Boyle
