= Portrait of Spencer Compton =

Painting by Godfrey Kneller

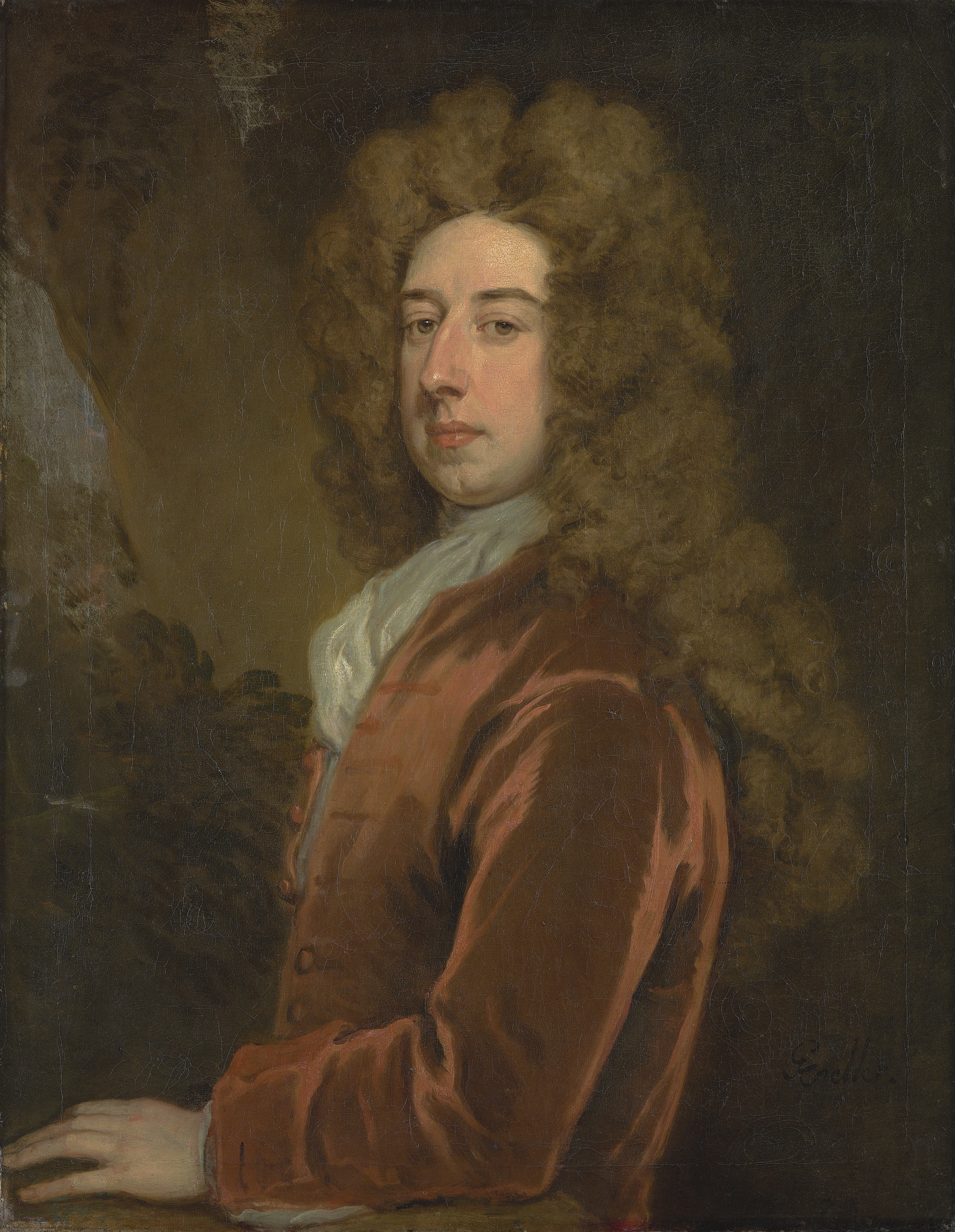
- Artist: Godfrey Kneller
- Year: c. 1710
- Medium: Oil on canvas
- Subject: Spencer Compton
- Dimensions: 91.4 cm (36.0 in) × 71.1 cm (28.0 in)
- Location: National Portrait Gallery, London
- Owner: Art Fund
- Accession no.: NPG 3234
- Identifiers: Art UK artwork ID: spencer-compton-earl-of-wilmington-157032

Portrait of Spencer Compton is a c. 1710 portrait painting of the English politician Spencer Compton by the German-born British artist Godfrey Kneller.

Compton was a Whig supporter of Robert Walpole, widely accredited as the first formal British prime minister. From 1715 to 1727 he was Speaker of the House of Commons. In 1730 he was appointed Lord President of the Council and elevated to be Earl of Wilmington. He succeeded Walpole as prime minister in 1742, but his administration lasted less than seventeen months before his death in 1743; he was replaced by his colleague and fellow Whig Henry Pelham.

The work was one of the series of kit-cat portraits by Kneller depicting members of the Kit-Cat Club, a dining society which included many leading Whigs. Today it is in the collection of the National Portrait Gallery, London. It was acquired by the gallery in 1945 with the support of the Art Fund.
