= Guillaume de Lamberty =

Guillaume de Lamberty (c. 1660–1733), a journalist as well as Hanoverian agent and correspondent at The Hague from 1706 to 1718, was born in Switzerland to Italian parents. He is most widely known for his fourteen-volume work that still remains useful to historians in the twenty-first century, Mémoires pour servir à l’histoire du XVIII siècle, a collection of valuable diplomatic and military documents on the period of the War of the Spanish Succession and the Great Northern War between 1696 and 1718.

== Career ==
Lamberty served as secretary to William Bentinck, Earl of Portland from 1698 to 1700. Sometime before 1702, he married Jeanne Champion de Crespigny. He went on to serve as agent and correspondent for the Elector of Hanover at The Hague from 12 June 1706 to 18 September 1718. During that time, he published Esprit des cours de l"Europe which was suppressed in 1701 after complaints from the French ambassador, the Comte d'Avaux, but it continued under a new name. He also privately produced and circulated a newsletter. He operated a rival secret information bureau to that of Etienne Caillaud and Pierre Jurieu and is known to have corresponded with a number of key individuals. From 1703 to 1704, he corresponded with the British Major-General John Cutts, 1st Baron Cutts. During the second half of the War of the Spanish Succession, the British Secretaries of State received his Newsletter. Other officials, included Hendrik Willem Rumpf, the Dutch Ambassador to Sweden in Stockholm He became so widely known that William Harrison, the Secretary at the British Embassy in The Hague, jokingly referred to publicists and newsletter writers as "our Lambertines". After 1718, he lived at Nyon and Bern, Switzerland, where he worked for the remainder of his life on his Mémoires pour servir à l’histoire du XVIII siècle.

== Publications ==
- L'Esprit des cours de l'Europe, où l'on voit tout ce qui s'y passe de plus important touchant la politique, & en général ce qu'il y a de plus remarquable dans les nouvelles. A Periodical in 17 volumes. From May to December 1701, it was edited by Lamberty under a new title: Nouvelles des Cours de l'Europe.
- Memoires de la Derniere Revolution d'Angleterre. By L.B.T.(= Lamberty). Two volumes. La Haye: les frères L'Honoré, 1702. A second, or possibly a rogue, edition appeared under the title Noveau Memoires Politiques pour Servuir a l'Intelligence des Revolutions Arriues dans la Grand Bretagne, by L.B.T., Two volumes. Cologne: Pierre Marteau, 1708.
- Mémoires pour servir à l’histoire du XVIII siècle, contenant les negociations, traitez, resolutions, et autres documents autentiques concernant les affaires d’etat: Liez par une narration historique des principaux evenements dont ils ont été précédez ou suivis, et particulièrement de ce qui s’est passé à la Haïe, qui a toûjours été comme le centre de toutes ces négociations. This work had three separate editions of 14 volumes each. First edition: Volumes 1–10, The Hague: Henri Scheurleer, 1724–37; volumes 11-14: Amsterdam: Pierre Mortier, 1734–1740. Second Edition: Amsterdam: Pierre Goss and Pierre Mortier, 1734–1740. Third Edition: Amsterdam and Leipzig: Arkstee & Merkus, 1757.

== Death ==
The "Will of the Noble Geronimo de Lamberty, Lord Baron of the Holy Roman Empire and Lord Resident or Ambassador of the … King of Sweden at the Republics of Bern and Geneva" was composed in French and signed in 1729. The will also names him as Giovanni Gerolamo Arconati Lamberti de Saint Leo. Geronimo died at Nyon on 9 January 1733 and the will was proven there, while a certified translation by Philip Crespigny, his wife's nephew, Notary Public, was lodged in England. His will passed probate in the Prerogative Court of Canterbury on 8 May 1733.
