= Earl of Wilmington =

British noble title

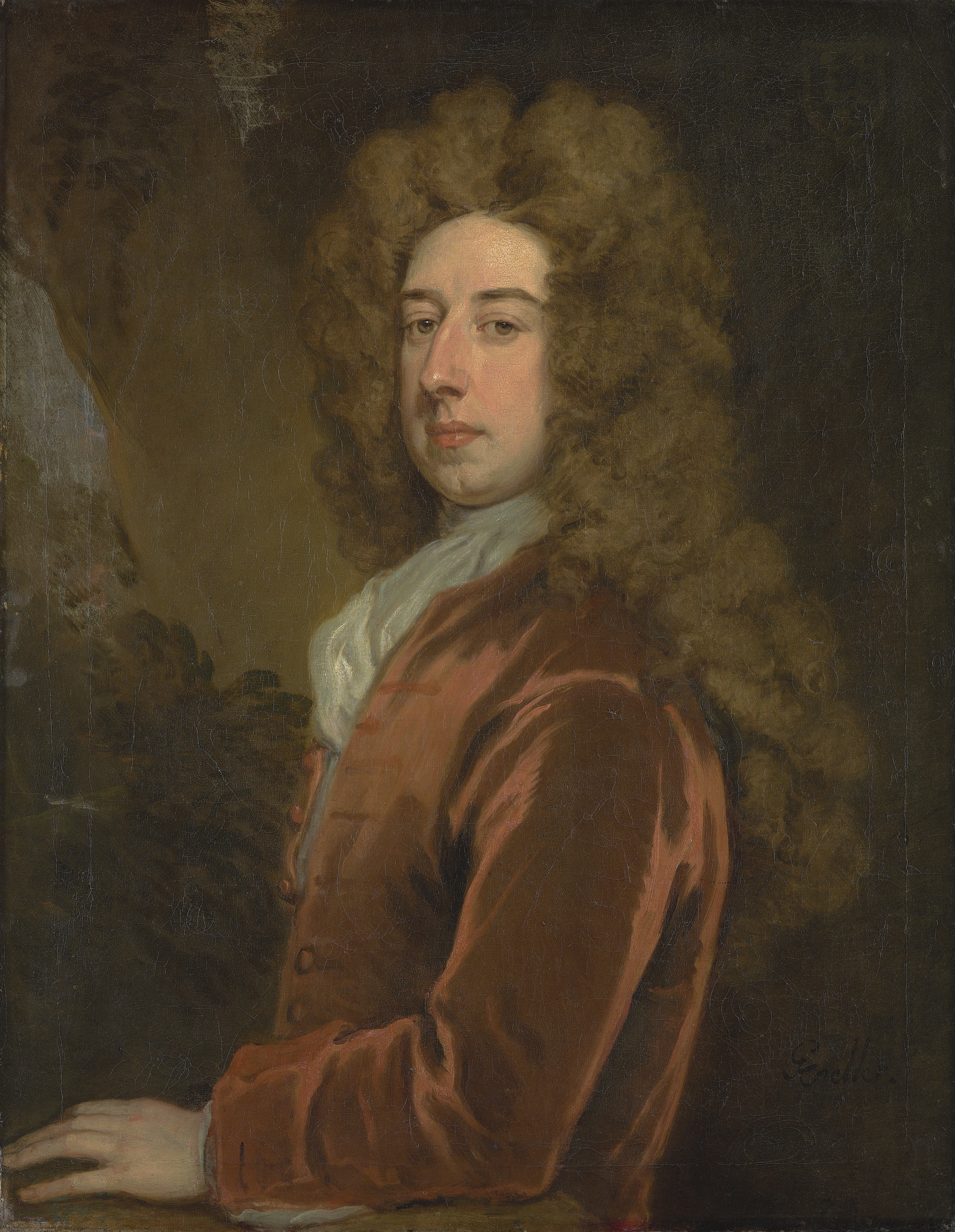
Portrait of Spencer Compton by Godfrey Keller, 1710.

Earl of Wilmington was a title in the Peerage of Great Britain. It was created in 1730 for the politician Spencer Compton, 1st Baron Wilmington, who later served as Prime Minister of Great Britain from 1742 to 1743, during the reign of George II. He had already been created Baron Wilmington in 1728 and was made Viscount Pevensey at the same time as he was given the earldom. Compton was the third son of James Compton, 3rd Earl of Northampton. The titles became extinct on his death in 1743, as he left no male heirs.

The Wilmington title was revived in 1812 when his great-great-nephew Charles Compton, 9th Earl of Northampton, was made Baron Wilmington, Earl Compton and Marquess of Northampton.

The American settlements of Wilmington, Massachusetts, Wilmington, Delaware; Wilmington, Vermont; and Wilmington, North Carolina were named for Spencer Compton, Earl of Wilmington.

== Earls of Wilmington (1730) ==
- Spencer Compton, 1st Earl of Wilmington (c. 1673–1743)

Huntingdon (7th creation), Northampton, and Wilmington family tree

Robert; 1000–1035; Duke of Normandy
Adelaide of Normandy c. 1030–before 1090; Countess of Aumale	William the Conqueror c. 1028–1087; King of England
Earl of Huntingdon (1st creation), 1065; Earl of Northampton (1st creation), 1071
Waltheof d. 1076; Earl of Northumbria, 1st Earl of Huntingdon and Earl of Northampton	Judith of Lens; 1054/1055–c. 1090, 2nd Earl of Huntingdon
Maud c. 1074–1130; 3rd Countess of Huntingdon, 2nd Countess of Northampton; Queen of Scotland	Simon I de Senlis d. 1111–1113; 3rd Earl of Huntingdon, 2nd Earl of Northampton jure uxoris
Simon II de Senlis c. 1098–1153; 4th Earl of Huntingdon, 3rd Earl of Northampton
Simon III de Senlis c. 1138–1184; 5th Earl of Huntingdon, 4th Earl of Northampton
Earldom of Northampton (1st creation) reverted to the Crown, 1184
Earl of Northampton (2nd creation), 1337
William de Bohun c. 1312 – 1373; Earl of Hereford, Earl of Essex, 1st Earl of Northampton	Edward III; 1312–1377; King of England
Humphrey de Bohun; 1342–1373; Earl of Hereford, Earl of Essex, 2nd Earl of Northampton	John of Gaunt; 1340–1399; Duke of Lancaster	Thomas of Woodstock; 1355–1397; Duke of Gloucester
Earldom of Northampton (2nd creation) abeyant, 1373
Earl of Northampton (2nd creation restored), 1384	Earl of Northampton (3rd creation), 1399
Henry Bolingbroke c. 1367 – 1413; 3rd Earl of Northampton, later King Henry IV	Anne of Gloucester; 1383–1438; Countess of Northampton
Earldom of Northampton (2nd creation) merged in the crown, 1399	Earldom of Northampton (3rd creation) extinct, 1438
Earl of Huntingdon (7th creation), 1529
George Hastings; 1488–1544; 1st Earl of Huntingdon
Baron Hastings of Loughborough, 1558
Francis Hastings; 1514–1561; 2nd Earl of Huntingdon	Edward Hastings c. 1521–1572; Baron Hastings of Loughborough
Barony Hastings of Loughborough extinct, 1572
Earl of Northampton, (4th creation), 1604	Baron Compton, 1572
Henry Howard; 1540–1614; Earl of Northampton	Henry Compton; 1544–1589; 1st Baron Compton	Frances Anne Hastings; 1533–1574	Henry Hastings; 1536–1595; 3rd Earl of Huntingdon	George Hastings; 1540–1604; 4th Earl of Huntingdon	Edward Hastings; 1541–1603
Earldom of Northampton (4th creation) extinct, 1614
Earl of Northampton (5th creation), 1618
William Compton d. 1630; 1st Earl of Northampton, 2nd Baron Compton	Francis Hastings; 1560–1595	Henry c. 1555–1640
Henry Hastings; 1586–1643; 5th Earl of Huntingdon
Spencer Compton; 1601–1643; 2nd Earl of Northampton, 3rd Baron Compton	Ferdinando Hastings; 1609–1656; 6th Earl of Huntingdon	Henry b. 1605
James Compton; 1622–1681; 3rd Earl of Northampton, 4th Baron Compton	Theophilus Hastings; 1650–1701; 7th Earl of Huntingdon	Richard; 1645–1714
Baron Wilmington, 1728; Earl of Wilmington and Viscount Pevensey, 1730
George Compton; 1664–1727; 4th Earl of Northampton, 5th Baron Compton	Spencer Compton c. 1674 – 1743; Earl of Wilmington, Viscount Pevensey, Baron Wilmington	George Hastings; 1677–1705; 8th Earl of Huntingdon	Henry; 1701–1786
Earldom of Wilmington, Vicountcy Pevensey, and Barony Wilmington extinct, 1743
James Compton; 1687–1754; 5th Earl of Northampton, 6th Baron Compton	George Compton; 1692–1758; 6th Earl of Northampton	Charles Compton	Theophilus Hastings c. 1696–1746; 9th Earl of Huntingdon
Charlotte Townshend d. 1770; Viscountess Townshend, Baroness Ferrers of Chartley, 7th Baroness Compton	Charles Compton; 1737–1763; 7th Earl of Northampton	Francis Hastings; 1729–1789; 10th Earl of Huntingdon	Theophilus Hastings; 1728–1804; 11th Earl of Huntingdon de jure	George; 1735–1802
Earldom of Huntingdon dormant/abeyant, 1804
George Townshend; 1753–1811; Marquess Townshend, Earl of Leicester, Viscount Townshend, Baron Townshend, Baron Ferrers of Chartley, 8th Baron Compton	Spencer Compton; 1760–1828; 8th Earl of Northampton
Marquess of Northampton (2nd creation), Earl Compton and Baron Wilmington, 1812	Earldom of Huntingdon claim restored, 1819
George Townshend (1778–1885); Marquess Townshend, Earl of Leicester, Viscount Townshend, Baron Townshend, Baron Ferrers of Chartley, 9th Baron Compton	Charles Compton; 1760–1828; 1st Marquess of Northampton, Earl Compton, and Baron Wilmington, 9th Earl of Northampton	Hans "Francis" Hastings; 1779–1828; 12th Earl of Huntingdon
Barony Compton abeyant, 1855
Spencer Joshua Alwyne Compton; 1790–1851; 2nd Marquess of Northampton, Earl Compton, and Baron Wilmington, 10th Earl of Northampton
Charles Douglas-Compton; 1816–1877; 3rd Marquess of Northampton, Earl Compton, and Baron Wilmington, 11th Earl of Northampton	William Compton; 1818–1897; 4th Marquess of Northampton, Earl Compton, and Baron Wilmington, 12th Earl of Northampton	Francis Theophilus Henry Hastings; 1808–1875; 13th Earl of Huntingdon	George; 1814–1876
Francis Power Plantagenet Hastings; 1841–1885; 14th Earl of Huntingdon
William George Spencer Scott Compton; 1851–1913; 5th Marquess of Northampton, Earl Compton, and Baron Wilmington, 13th Earl of Northampton	Warner Francis John Plantagenet Hastings; 1868–1939; 15th Earl of Huntingdon	Aubrey; 1878–1929	Hans; 1865–1933
William Bingham Compton; 1885–1978; 6th Marquess of Northampton, Earl Compton, and Baron Wilmington, 14th Earl of Northampton	Francis John Clarence Westenra Plantagenet Hastings; 1901–1990; 16th Earl of Huntingdon	Peter Hastings-Bass; 1920–1964	George; 1905–1981
Spencer Douglas David Compton b. 1946; 7th Marquess of Northampton, Earl Compton, and Baron Wilmington, 15th Earl of Northampton	William Edward Robin Hood Hastings-Bass b. 1948; 17th Earl of Huntingdon	John Hastings-Bass b. 1954	George; 1938–2005
Heir presumptive to the Earldom of Huntingdon
Daniel Bingham Compton b. 1973 styled Earl Compton	Adam b. 1977
Heir apparent to the Marquessate of Northampton	Second Heir presumptive to the Earldom of Huntingdon

== See also ==
- Marquess of Northampton
- Baron Compton
