= Leonard Gale =

Professor of chemistry and mineralogy

Leonard Dunnell Gale
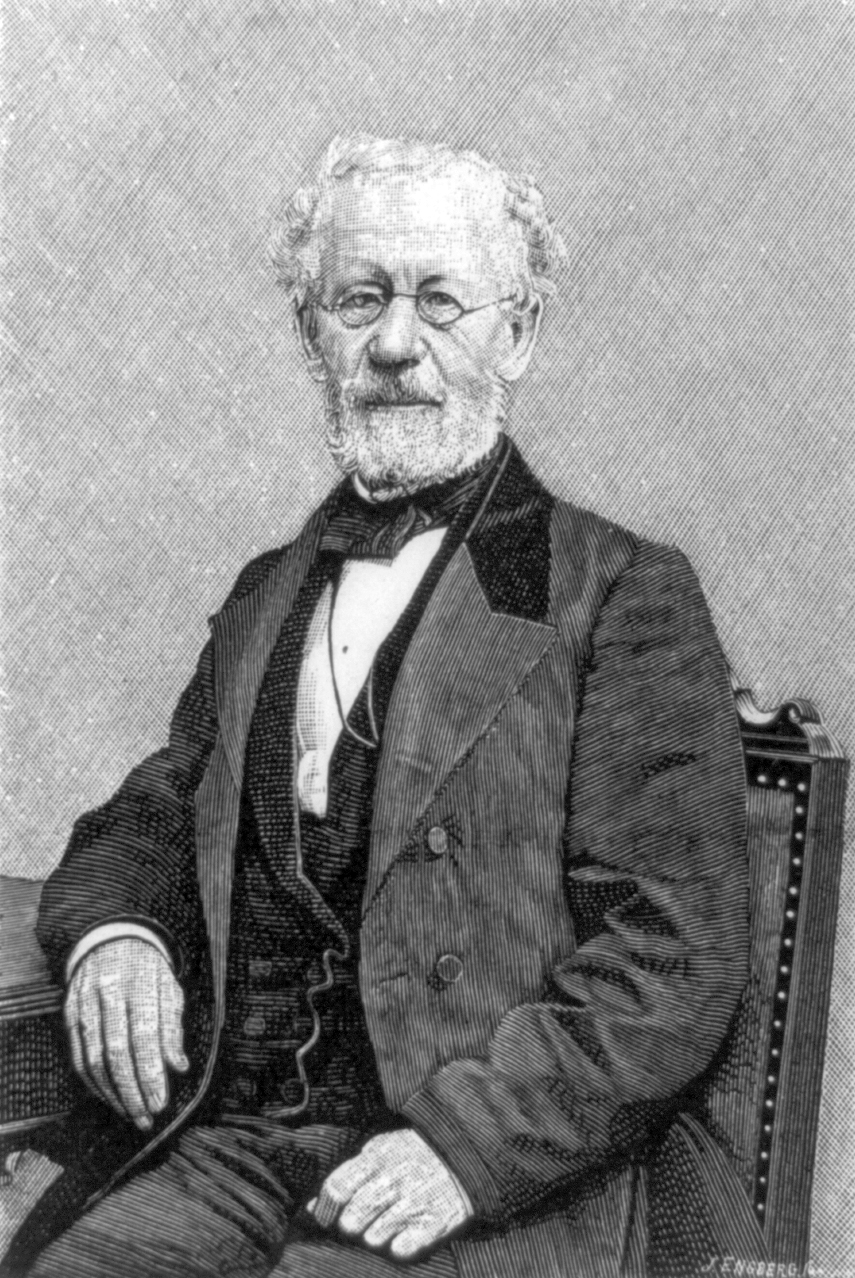
- Leonard Gale, who helped Samuel Morse achieve the technological breakthrough of getting the telegraphic signal to travel long distances over wire
- Born: July 25, 1800
- Died: October 22, 1883 (aged 83)

Leonard Dunnell Gale (July 25, 1800 – October 22, 1883) was a professor of chemistry and mineralogy who helped Samuel Morse develop the electromagnetic telegraph.

== Education and work in chemistry ==
Gale was a graduate of Union College in Schenectady, New York. After graduating, he devoted himself to the pursuit of chemistry and became a professor in several institutions of learning. In 1833 he made a geological survey of Manhattan Island, and not long afterward was appointed professor of chemistry and mineralogy in the New York City University.

== Work with Samuel Morse ==
In 1836, he formed the acquaintance of Samuel Morse, and by his familiarity with the discoveries of Professor Henry was enabled to render his colleague's project of an electromagnetic telegraph successful in operation. In 1846 he came to Washington, and for eleven years was an examiner in the United States Patent and Trademark Office in charge of the department of chemical inventions. In 1857, having been removed from that office, he practiced in Washington, D.C. for some years as an expert and attorney in chemical applications. He is buried in the Washington Congressional Cemetery.

== See also ==
- Telegraph in United States history
